= List of municipalities in Burgos =

Map of Spain with the province of Burgos highlighted

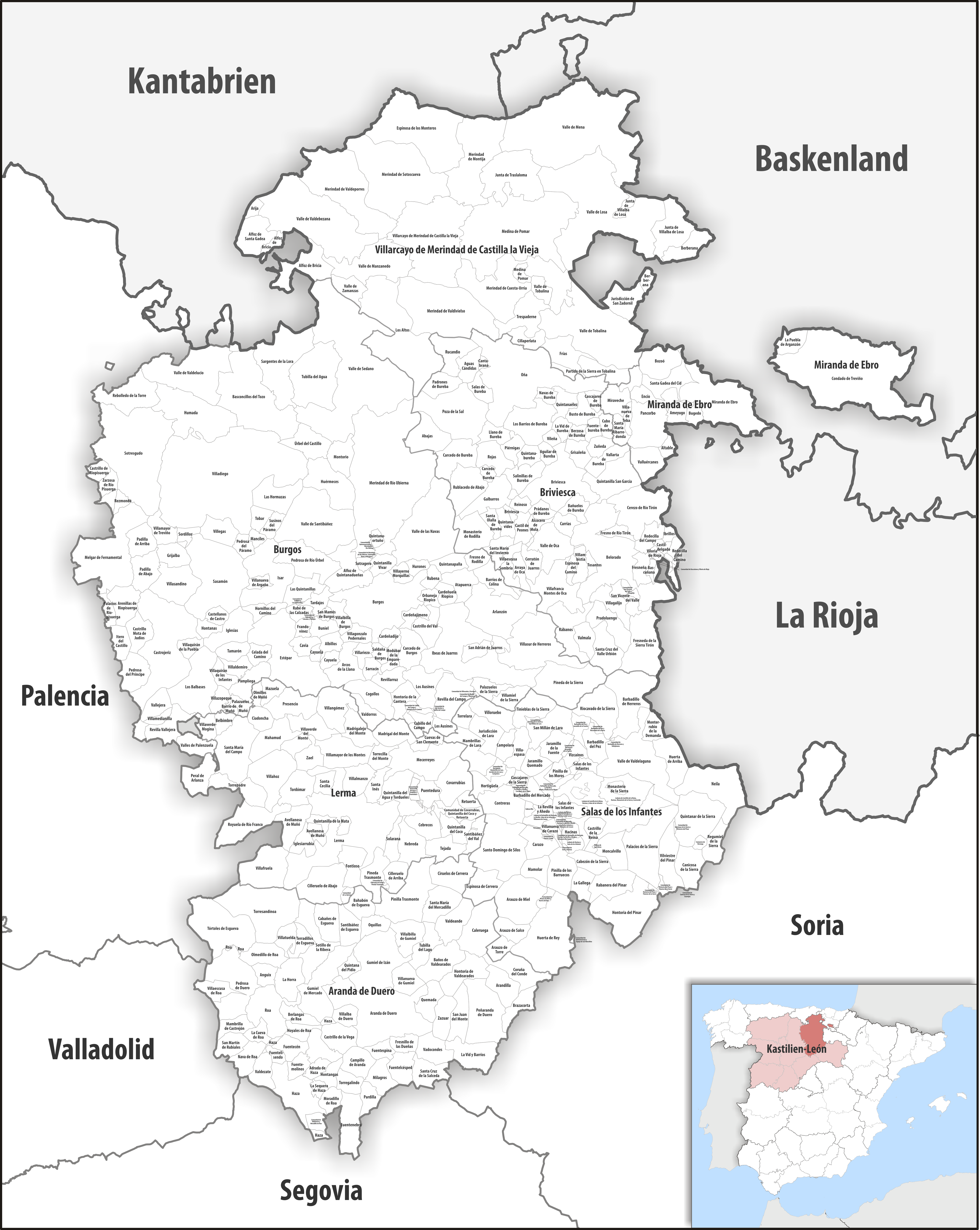
Map of the municipalities in the province of Burgos

Burgos is a province in the autonomous community of Castile and León, Spain. The province is divided into 371 municipalities, making it the province with the largest number of municipalities. As of the 2024 Spanish census, Burgos is the 36th most populous of Spain's 50 provinces, with 359,740 inhabitants, and the 11th largest by land area, spanning 14,021.65 square kilometres (5,413.79 sq mi). Municipalities are the most basic local political division in Spain and can only belong to one province. They enjoy a large degree of autonomy in their local administration, being in charge of tasks such as urban planning, water supply, lighting, roads, local police, and firefighting.

The organisation of municipalities in Spain is outlined by the local government law Ley 7/1985, de 2 de abril, Reguladora de las Bases del Régimen Local (transl. Law 7/1985, of 2 April, Regulating the Bases of the Local Administration), which was passed by the Cortes Generales—Spain’s national parliament—on 2 April 1985 and finalised by royal decree on 18 April 1986. Municipalities in Burgos are also governed by the Statute of Autonomy of Castile and León, which includes provisions concerning their relations with Castile and León's autonomous government. All citizens of Spain are required to register in the municipality in which they reside. Each municipality is a corporation (Note: Within the context of local government in Spain, a corporation is a legal entity representing a municipality. Each municipality is empowered to govern over a specific piece of land and its population.) with independent legal personhood: its governing body is called the ayuntamiento (municipal council or corporation), a term often also used to refer to the municipal offices (city and town halls). The ayuntamiento is composed of the mayor (Spanish: alcalde), the deputy mayors (tenientes de alcalde) and the councillors (concejales), who form the plenary (pleno), the deliberative body. Municipalities are categorised by population for determining the number of councillors: three when the population is up to 100 inhabitants, five for 101–250, seven for 251–1,000, nine for 1,001–2,000, eleven for 2,001–5,000, thirteen for 5,001–10,000, seventeen for 10,001–20,000, twenty-one for 20,001–50,000, and twenty-five for 50,001–100,000. One councillor is added for every additional 100,000 inhabitants, with a further one included if the total would otherwise be even, to avoid tied votes.

The mayor and the deputy mayors are elected by the plenary assembly, which is itself elected by universal suffrage. Elections in municipalities with more than 250 inhabitants are carried out following a proportional representation system with closed lists, whilst those with a population lower than 250 use a block plurality voting system with open lists. The plenary assembly must meet periodically, with meetings occurring more or less frequently depending on the population of the municipality: monthly for those whose population is larger than 20,000, once every two months if it ranges between 5,001 and 20,000, and once every three months if it does not exceed 5,000. Many ayuntamientos also have a local governing board (Spanish: junta de gobierno local), which is appointed by the mayor from amongst the councillors and is required for municipalities of over 5,000 inhabitants. The board, whose role is to assist the mayor between meetings of the plenary assembly, may not include more than one third of the councillors.

Some of the municipalities within the province of Burgos are in turn grouped into mancomunidades. The largest municipality by population in the province as of the 2024 Spanish census is Burgos, its capital, with 176,551 residents, while the smallest is Villamedianilla, with 9 residents. The largest municipality by area is Villadiego, which spans 327.96 square kilometres (126.63 sq mi), while Cantabrana is the smallest at 3.14 square kilometres (1.21 sq mi).

== Municipalities ==
Largest municipalities in the province of Burgos by population

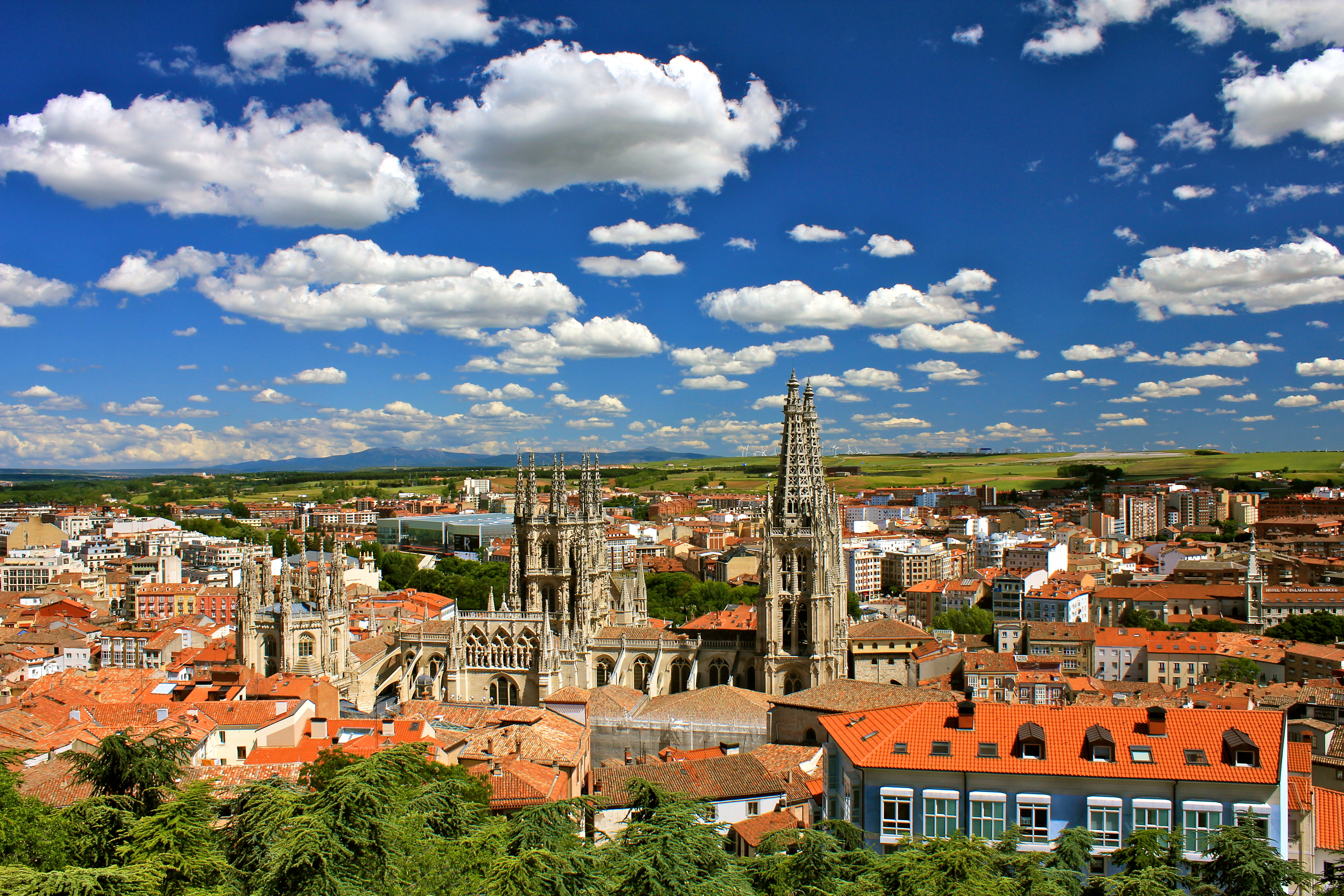
Burgos is the province's capital and largest municipality by population.

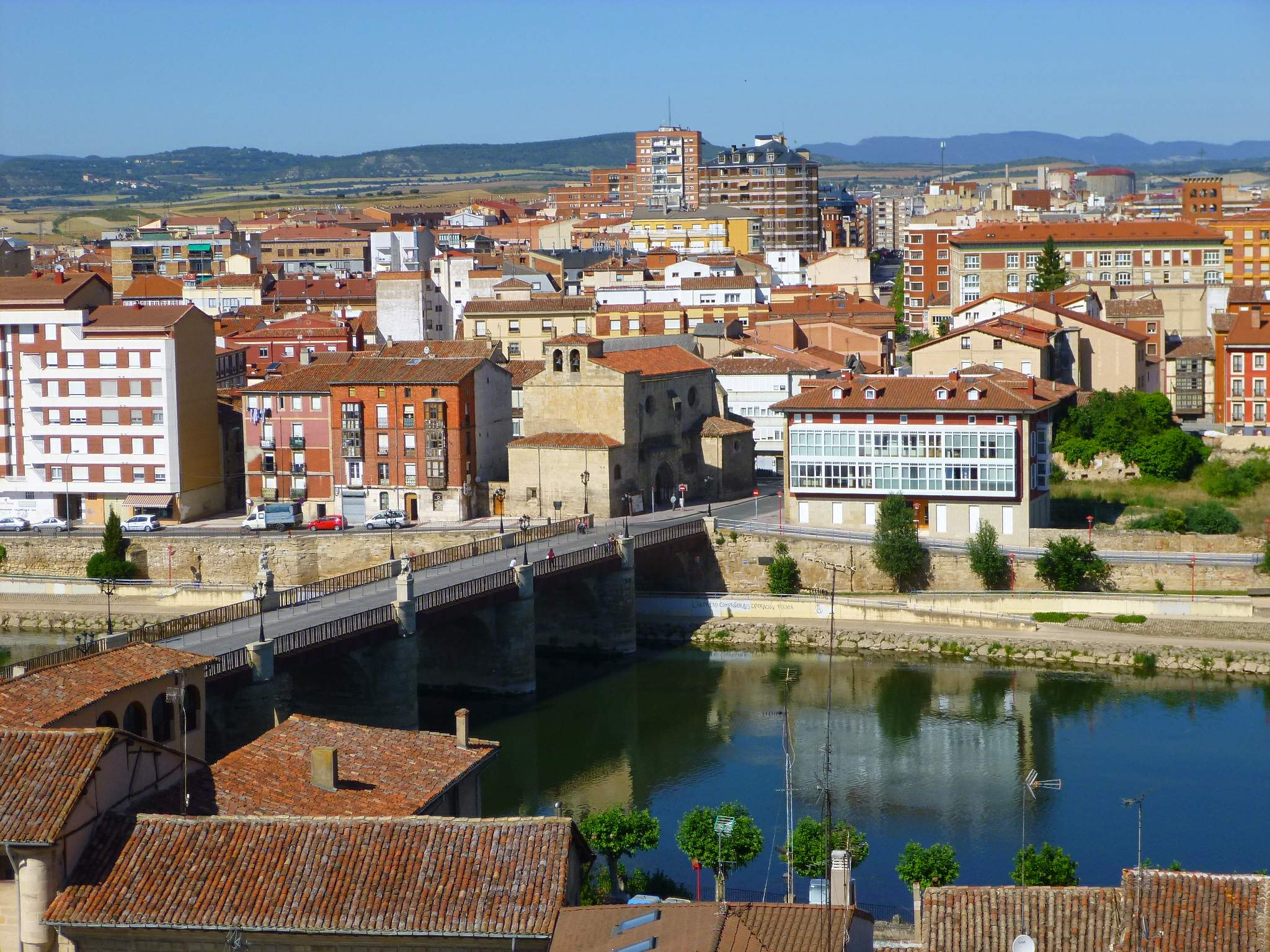
Miranda de Ebro, the second largest municipality by population in Burgos

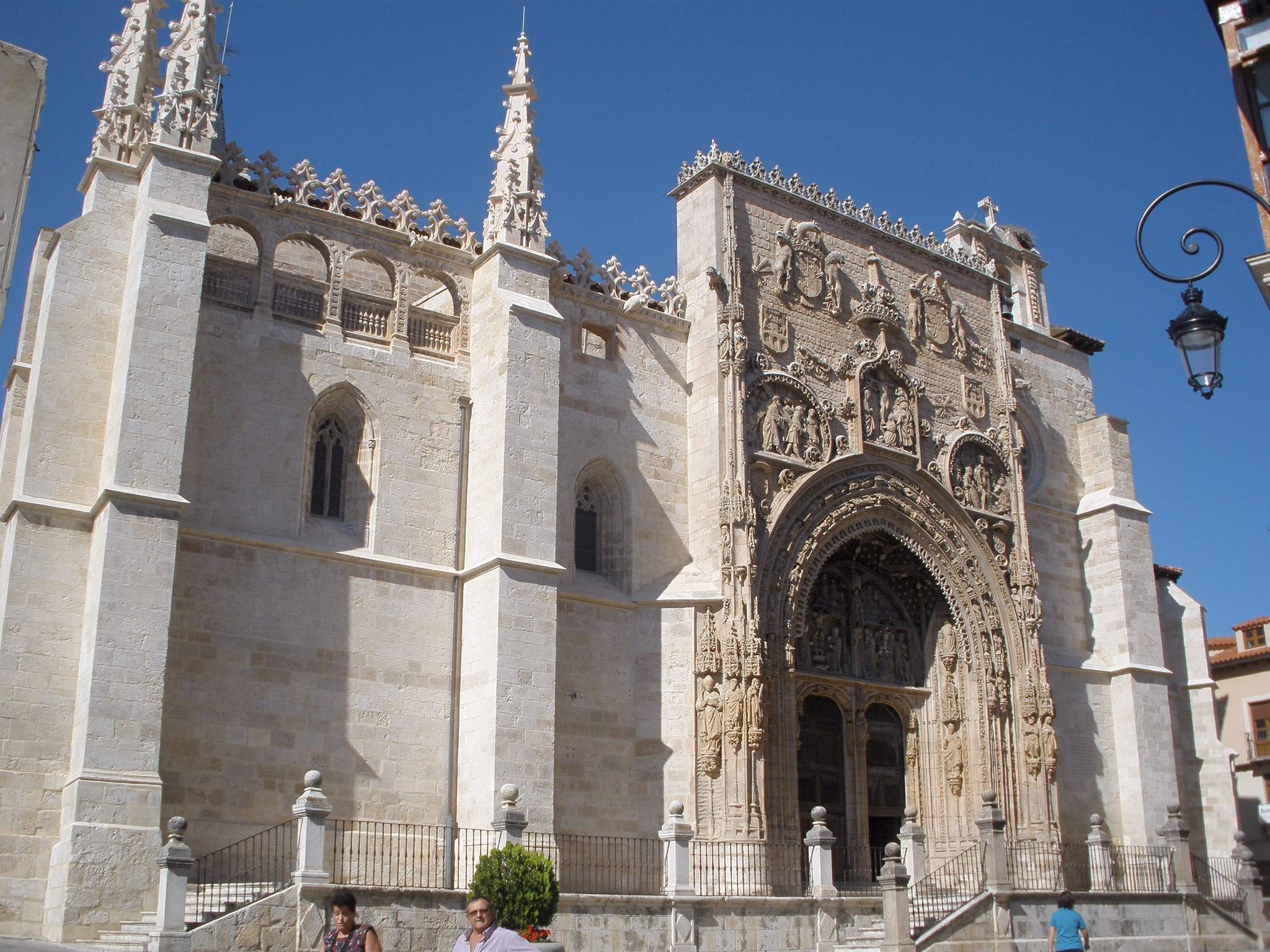
Aranda de Duero is the province's third largest municipality by population.

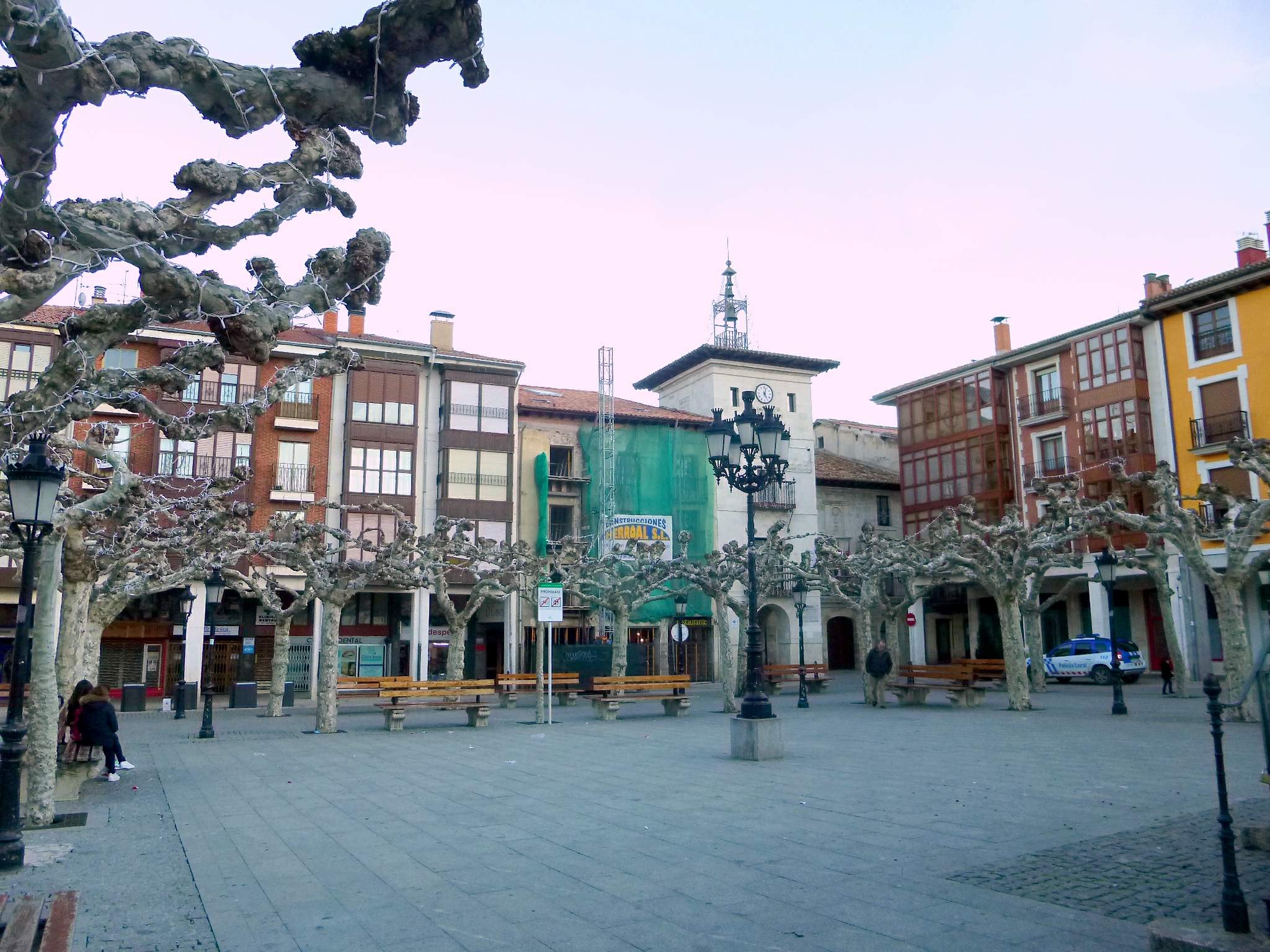
Briviesca, Burgos' fourth largest municipality by population

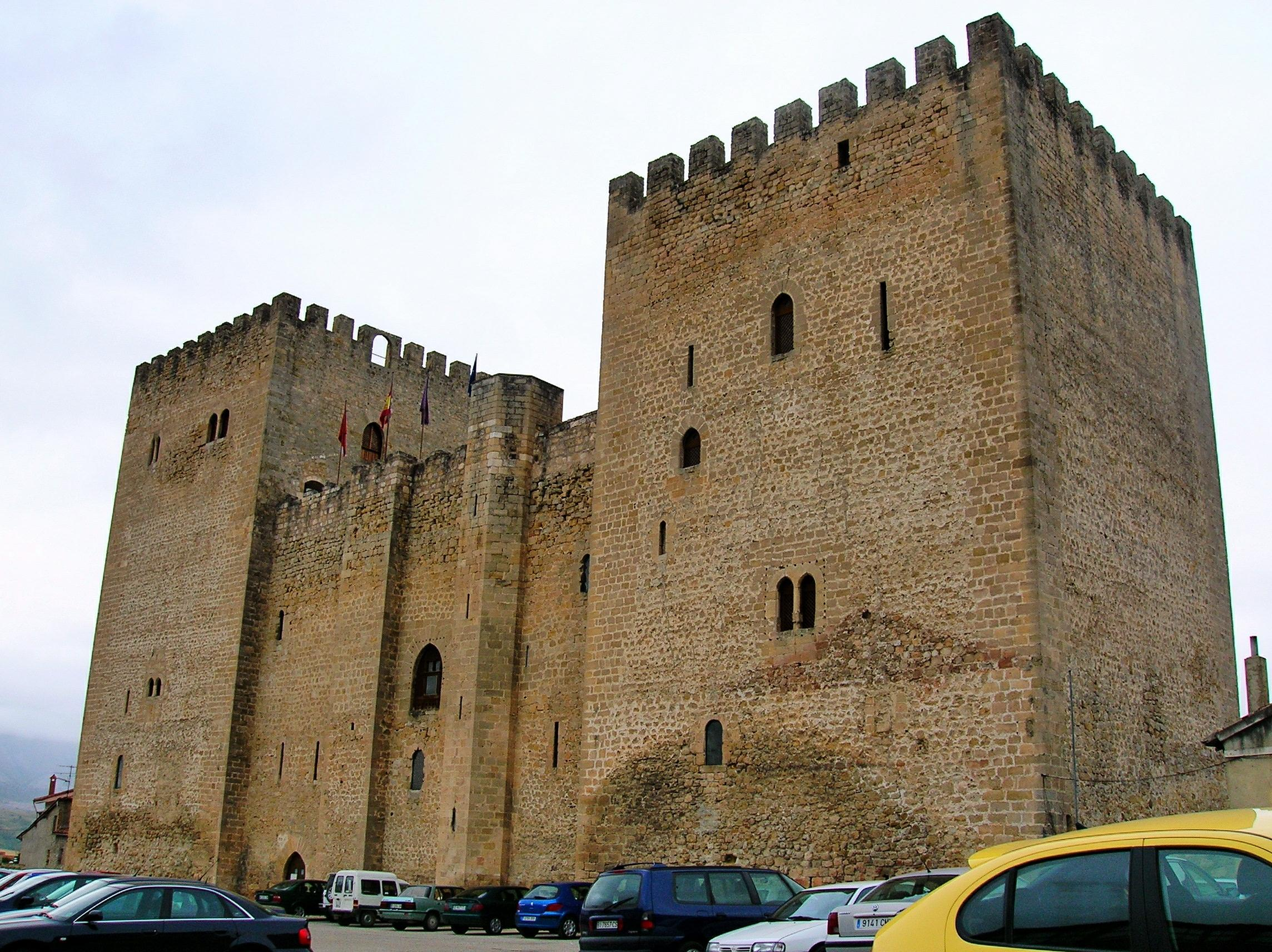
Medina de Pomar, the fifth largest municipality by population in Burgos

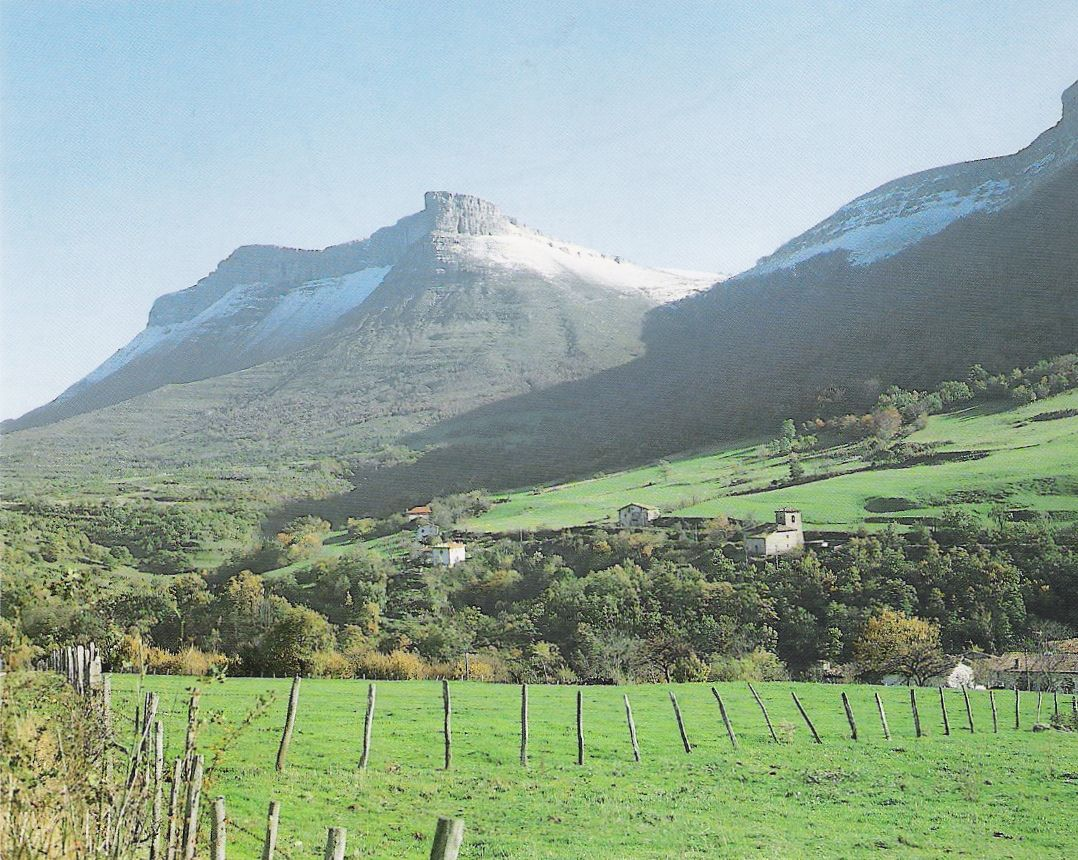
Valle de Mena is the province's sixth largest municipality by population.

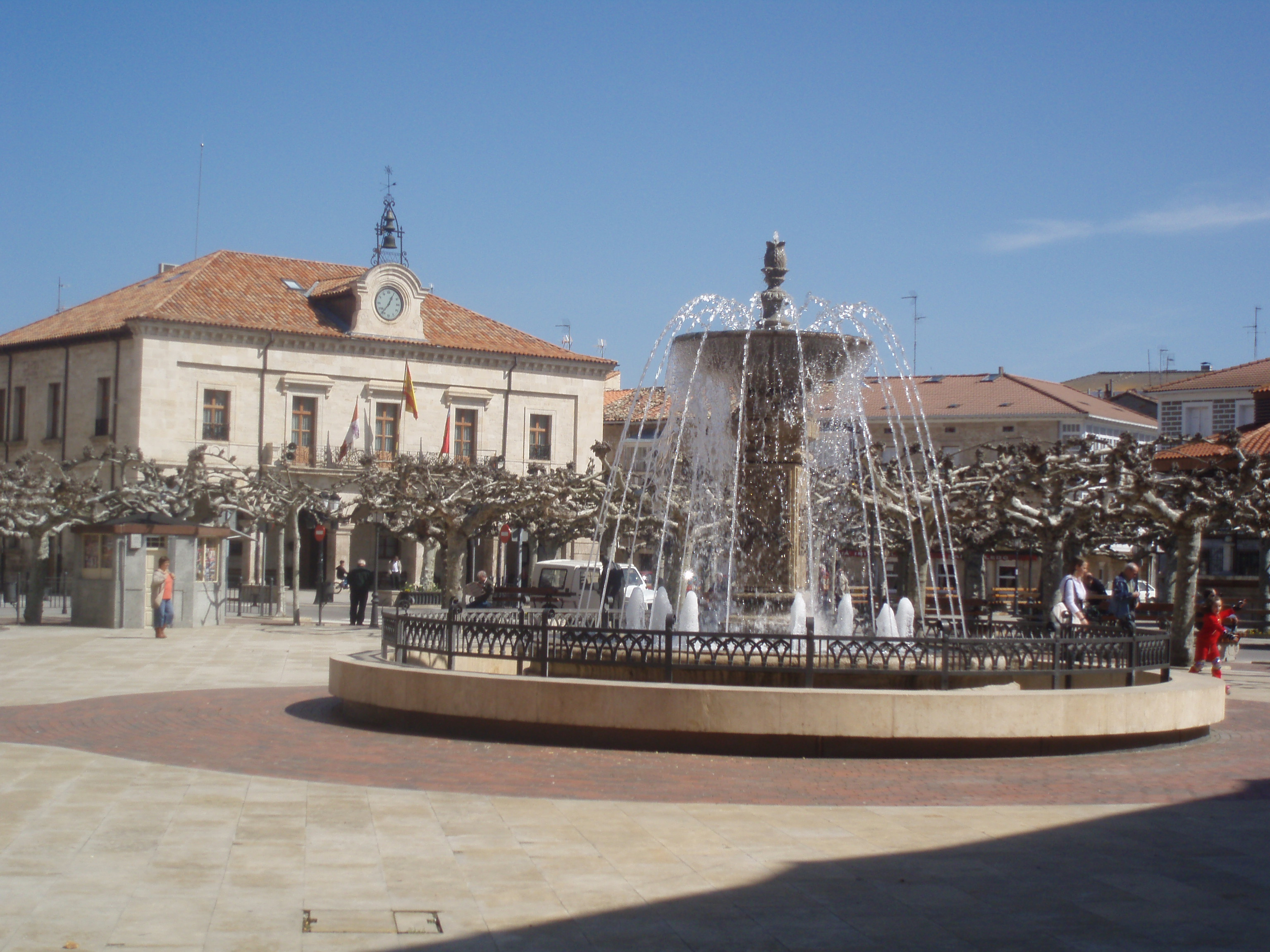
Villarcayo de Merindad de Castilla la Vieja, Burgos' seventh largest municipality by population

† Provincial capital

Municipalities in the province of Burgos
Name	Mancomunidad (Note: When a municipality belongs to more than one mancomunidad, the names of these are separated by commas.)	Population (2024 census)	Population (2011 census)	Population change	Land area (km²)	Population density (2024)
Abajas	—	28	29	−3.4%	35.07	0.8/km^{2}
Adrada de Haza	Ribera del Duero-Comarca de Roa	205	238	−13.9%	10.28	19.9/km^{2}
Aguas Cándidas	Oña-Bureba-Caderecha	59	63	−6.3%	17.95	3.3/km^{2}
Aguilar de Bureba	—	50	62	−19.4%	9.45	5.3/km^{2}
Albillos	Ribera del Río Ausín y zona de San Pedro Cardeña	215	215	0.0%	12.36	17.4/km^{2}
Alcocero de Mola	Oca-Tirón	41	32	+28.1%	8.33	4.9/km^{2}
Alfoz de Bricia	Noroeste de Burgos	68	86	−20.9%	51.69	1.3/km^{2}
Alfoz de Quintanadueñas	Tierras del Cid	2,139	1,962	+9.0%	41.51	51.5/km^{2}
Alfoz de Santa Gadea	Noroeste de Burgos	101	114	−11.4%	34.39	2.9/km^{2}
Altable	Desfiladero y Bureba	46	54	−14.8%	8.22	5.6/km^{2}
Los Altos	—	186	194	−4.1%	139.85	1.3/km^{2}
Ameyugo	Desfiladero y Bureba	107	101	+5.9%	12.51	8.6/km^{2}
Anguix	Ribera del Duero-Comarca de Roa, Ruta del Vino - Afluente Rural	158	135	+17.0%	13.44	11.8/km^{2}
Aranda de Duero	—	33,675	33,239	+1.3%	127.28	264.6/km^{2}
Arandilla	Río Arandilla, Sierra de Arlanza	155	176	−11.9%	26.68	5.8/km^{2}
Arauzo de Miel	—	272	367	−25.9%	57.10	4.8/km^{2}
Arauzo de Salce	Alfoz de Lara	46	73	−37.0%	18.50	2.5/km^{2}
Arauzo de Torre	Alfoz de Lara	61	91	−33.0%	13.59	4.5/km^{2}
Arcos	Ribera del Río Ausín y zona de San Pedro Cardeña	1,838	1,384	+32.8%	31.44	58.5/km^{2}
Arenillas de Riopisuerga	—	169	189	−10.6%	27.99	6.0/km^{2}
Arija	Noroeste de Burgos	115	162	−29.0%	7.02	16.4/km^{2}
Arlanzón	Comarca del Arlanzón, Ríos Arlanzón y Vena	427	430	−0.7%	77.74	5.5/km^{2}
Arraya de Oca	Oca-Tirón	53	54	−1.9%	12.25	4.3/km^{2}
Atapuerca	Encuentro de Caminos, Comarca del Arlanzón, Ríos Arlanzón y Vena, Tierras del Cid	182	209	−12.9%	24.78	7.3/km^{2}
Los Ausines	Comarca del Arlanzón	165	154	+7.1%	41.68	4.0/km^{2}
Avellanosa de Muñó	Ribera del Arlanza y del Monte	97	121	−19.8%	36.89	2.6/km^{2}
Bahabón de Esgueva	Ribera del Duero-Comarca de Roa	84	114	−26.3%	21.39	3.9/km^{2}
Los Balbases	Bajo Arlanza	306	340	−10.0%	64.37	4.8/km^{2}
Baños de Valdearados	Río Arandilla	320	377	−15.1%	36.52	8.8/km^{2}
Bañuelos de Bureba	—	31	33	−6.1%	15.44	2.0/km^{2}
Barbadillo de Herreros	Alfoz de Lara, Sierra de Arlanza	104	122	−14.8%	64.16	1.6/km^{2}
Barbadillo del Mercado	Alfoz de Lara, Sierra de Arlanza	133	151	−11.9%	15.19	8.8/km^{2}
Barbadillo del Pez	Alfoz de Lara, Sierra de Arlanza	66	76	−13.2%	20.76	3.2/km^{2}
Barrio de Muñó	Bajo Arlanza, Campos de Muñó	32	34	−5.9%	3.88	8.2/km^{2}
Los Barrios de Bureba	—	178	217	−18.0%	46.72	3.8/km^{2}
Barrios de Colina	Comarca del Arlanzón, Ríos Arlanzón y Vena	55	57	−3.5%	23.49	2.3/km^{2}
Basconcillos del Tozo	Páramos y Valles	294	315	−6.7%	120.67	2.4/km^{2}
Bascuñana	—	18	46	−60.9%	7.76	2.3/km^{2}
Belbimbre	Bajo Arlanza, Campos de Muñó	55	75	−26.7%	10.23	5.4/km^{2}
Belorado	—	1,836	2,068	−11.2%	133.41	13.8/km^{2}
Berberana	Norte-Trueba-Jerea	48	72	−33.3%	33.40	1.4/km^{2}
Berlangas de Roa	Ribera del Duero-Comarca de Roa	203	192	+5.7%	15.71	12.9/km^{2}
Berzosa de Bureba	—	26	38	−31.6%	7.84	3.3/km^{2}
Bozoó	Desfiladero y Bureba	102	108	−5.6%	33.25	3.1/km^{2}
Brazacorta	Río Arandilla	45	64	−29.7%	21.08	2.1/km^{2}
Briviesca	Oña-Bureba-Caderecha	6,547	7,585	−13.7%	81.20	80.6/km^{2}
Bugedo	Desfiladero y Bureba	191	188	+1.6%	9.93	19.2/km^{2}
Buniel	Pueblos de la Vecindad de Burgos	611	496	+23.2%	13.28	46.0/km^{2}
Burgos†	—	176,551	178,864	−1.3%	107.06	1,649.1/km^{2}
Busto de Bureba	—	143	188	−23.9%	18.56	7.7/km^{2}
Cabañes de Esgueva	Ribera del Duero-Comarca de Roa	149	202	−26.2%	26.57	5.6/km^{2}
Cabezón de la Sierra	Alfoz de Lara, Sierra de Arlanza	36	54	−33.3%	19.83	1.8/km^{2}
Caleruega	—	387	499	−22.4%	47.63	8.1/km^{2}
Campillo de Aranda	—	172	178	−3.4%	23.92	7.2/km^{2}
Campolara	Ribera del Arlanza y del Monte	48	59	−18.6%	13.24	3.6/km^{2}
Canicosa de la Sierra	Alta Sierra de Pinares	425	549	−22.6%	29.53	14.4/km^{2}
Cantabrana	Oña-Bureba-Caderecha	23	31	−25.8%	3.14	7.3/km^{2}
Carazo	Sierra de Arlanza	39	41	−4.9%	24.03	1.6/km^{2}
Carcedo de Bureba	Oña-Bureba-Caderecha	37	45	−17.8%	42.66	0.9/km^{2}
Carcedo de Burgos	Ribera del Río Ausín y zona de San Pedro Cardeña	485	362	+34.0%	25.68	18.9/km^{2}
Cardeñadijo	Ribera del Río Ausín y zona de San Pedro Cardeña	1,430	1,186	+20.6%	9.21	155.3/km^{2}
Cardeñajimeno	Ribera del Río Ausín y zona de San Pedro Cardeña	1,168	976	+19.7%	12.19	95.8/km^{2}
Cardeñuela Riopico	Encuentro de Caminos, Comarca del Arlanzón	111	147	−24.5%	11.28	9.8/km^{2}
Carrias	—	24	26	−7.7%	13.26	1.8/km^{2}
Cascajares de Bureba	—	27	36	−25.0%	7.92	3.4/km^{2}
Cascajares de la Sierra	Alfoz de Lara, Sierra de Arlanza	27	40	−32.5%	6.81	4.0/km^{2}
Castellanos de Castro	Peña-Amaya	46	52	−11.5%	9.93	4.6/km^{2}
Castildelgado	—	35	50	−30.0%	4.95	7.1/km^{2}
Castil de Peones	—	28	32	−12.5%	13.98	2.0/km^{2}
Castrillo de la Reina	Alfoz de Lara, Sierra de Arlanza	158	215	−26.5%	14.45	10.9/km^{2}
Castrillo de la Vega	Ribera del Duero-Comarca de Roa	620	644	−3.7%	26.42	23.5/km^{2}
Castrillo del Val	Ribera del Río Ausín y zona de San Pedro Cardeña	819	790	+3.7%	22.54	36.3/km^{2}
Castrillo de Riopisuerga	Boedo-Ojeda	58	70	−17.1%	17.44	3.3/km^{2}
Castrillo Mota de Judíos	Peña-Amaya	52	65	−20.0%	22.05	2.4/km^{2}
Castrojeriz	Peña-Amaya	780	857	−9.0%	136.07	5.7/km^{2}
Cavia	Ribera del Río Ausín y zona de San Pedro Cardeña	252	266	−5.3%	12.98	19.4/km^{2}
Cayuela	Ribera del Río Ausín y zona de San Pedro Cardeña	188	193	−2.6%	13.47	14.0/km^{2}
Cebrecos	—	58	52	+11.5%	23.30	2.5/km^{2}
Celada del Camino	Campos de Muñó	90	98	−8.2%	12.57	7.2/km^{2}
Cerezo de Río Tirón	Cerezo-Tormantos, Oca-Tirón	491	620	−20.8%	63.70	7.7/km^{2}
Cerratón de Juarros	—	45	54	−16.7%	16.25	2.8/km^{2}
Ciadoncha	Bajo Arlanza, Campos de Muñó	73	70	+4.3%	15.29	4.8/km^{2}
Cillaperlata	Comarca del Ebro-Nela	30	45	−33.3%	16.82	1.8/km^{2}
Cilleruelo de Abajo	Ribera del Arlanza y del Monte	209	268	−22.0%	48.16	4.3/km^{2}
Cilleruelo de Arriba	La Yecla	49	60	−18.3%	18.49	2.7/km^{2}
Ciruelos de Cervera	La Yecla	99	113	−12.4%	37.87	2.6/km^{2}
Cogollos	Ribera del Río Ausín y zona de San Pedro Cardeña	677	492	+37.6%	31.25	21.7/km^{2}
Condado de Treviño	—	1,490	1,470	+1.4%	260.36	5.7/km^{2}
Contreras	Alfoz de Lara, Sierra de Arlanza	87	96	−9.4%	38.12	2.3/km^{2}
Coruña del Conde	Río Arandilla	100	126	−20.6%	34.35	2.9/km^{2}
Covarrubias	Ribera del Arlanza y del Monte	505	634	−20.3%	41.63	12.1/km^{2}
Cubillo del Campo	Ribera del Río Ausín y zona de San Pedro Cardeña	102	102	0.0%	14.06	7.3/km^{2}
Cubo de Bureba	Desfiladero y Bureba	102	104	−1.9%	9.80	10.4/km^{2}
La Cueva de Roa	Ribera del Duero-Comarca de Roa	90	102	−11.8%	11.91	7.6/km^{2}
Cuevas de San Clemente	Ribera del Arlanza y del Monte	45	52	−13.5%	13.26	3.4/km^{2}
Encío	Desfiladero y Bureba	41	46	−10.9%	18.76	2.2/km^{2}
Espinosa de Cervera	—	85	97	−12.4%	29.62	2.9/km^{2}
Espinosa del Camino	Oca-Tirón	42	39	+7.7%	6.93	6.1/km^{2}
Espinosa de los Monteros	—	1,648	1,977	−16.6%	137.17	12.0/km^{2}
Estépar	Pueblos de la Vecindad de Burgos, Ribera del Río Ausín y zona de San Pedro Cardeña	635	700	−9.3%	102.70	6.2/km^{2}
Fontioso	Ribera del Arlanza y del Monte	54	58	−6.9%	24.84	2.2/km^{2}
Frandovínez	—	96	104	−7.7%	8.58	11.2/km^{2}
Fresneda de la Sierra Tirón	Sierra de Arlanza, Sierra de la Demanda	97	134	−27.6%	61.17	1.6/km^{2}
Fresneña	—	66	94	−29.8%	14.01	4.7/km^{2}
Fresnillo de las Dueñas	Río Arandilla	696	546	+27.5%	13.69	50.8/km^{2}
Fresno de Río Tirón	Oca-Tirón	161	189	−14.8%	9.68	16.6/km^{2}
Fresno de Rodilla	Encuentro de Caminos, Ríos Arlanzón y Vena, Tierras del Cid	49	48	+2.1%	12.15	4.0/km^{2}
Frías	Comarca del Ebro-Nela, Raíces de Castilla	270	275	−1.8%	29.50	9.2/km^{2}
Fuentebureba	Desfiladero y Bureba	56	43	+30.2%	9.09	6.2/km^{2}
Fuentecén	Ribera del Duero-Comarca de Roa	234	241	−2.9%	17.05	13.7/km^{2}
Fuentelcésped	Valle de Río Riaza	275	235	+17.0%	22.42	12.3/km^{2}
Fuentelisendo	Ribera del Duero-Comarca de Roa	101	99	+2.0%	6.97	14.5/km^{2}
Fuentemolinos	Ribera del Duero-Comarca de Roa	91	106	−14.2%	12.81	7.1/km^{2}
Fuentenebro	Valle de Río Riaza	138	151	−8.6%	38.99	3.5/km^{2}
Fuentespina	Valle de Río Riaza	816	738	+10.6%	12.03	67.8/km^{2}
Galbarros	—	27	31	−12.9%	31.99	0.8/km^{2}
La Gallega	Alfoz de Lara, Sierra de Arlanza	39	65	−40.0%	17.35	2.2/km^{2}
Grijalba	Odra-Pisuerga	118	119	−0.8%	19.75	6.0/km^{2}
Grisaleña	—	53	40	+32.5%	16.35	3.2/km^{2}
Gumiel de Izán	Ribera del Duero-Comarca de Roa, Ruta del Vino - Afluente Rural	582	620	−6.1%	75.50	7.7/km^{2}
Gumiel de Mercado	Ribera del Duero-Comarca de Roa	385	368	+4.6%	57.71	6.7/km^{2}
Hacinas	Sierra de Arlanza	147	178	−17.4%	7.90	18.6/km^{2}
Haza	Ribera del Duero-Comarca de Roa	34	26	+30.8%	82.30	0.4/km^{2}
Hontanas	Peña-Amaya	70	71	−1.4%	10.22	6.8/km^{2}
Hontangas	Ribera del Duero-Comarca de Roa	99	113	−12.4%	12.22	8.1/km^{2}
Hontoria de la Cantera	Ribera del Río Ausín y zona de San Pedro Cardeña	174	135	+28.9%	19.39	9.0/km^{2}
Hontoria del Pinar	—	609	766	−20.5%	80.84	7.5/km^{2}
Hontoria de Valdearados	Río Arandilla	168	225	−25.3%	33.58	5.0/km^{2}
Las Hormazas	Peña-Amaya	99	107	−7.5%	36.58	2.7/km^{2}
Hornillos del Camino	Pueblos de la Vecindad de Burgos	47	60	−21.7%	14.08	3.3/km^{2}
La Horra	Ribera del Duero-Comarca de Roa, Ruta del Vino - Afluente Rural	299	384	−22.1%	29.99	10.0/km^{2}
Hortigüela	Ribera del Arlanza y del Monte, Sierra de Arlanza	107	105	+1.9%	20.66	5.2/km^{2}
Hoyales de Roa	Ribera del Duero-Comarca de Roa	212	240	−11.7%	12.78	16.6/km^{2}
Huérmeces	—	153	130	+17.7%	48.70	3.1/km^{2}
Huerta de Arriba	Alfoz de Lara	128	135	−5.2%	33.18	3.9/km^{2}
Huerta de Rey	—	880	1,062	−17.1%	97.81	9.0/km^{2}
Humada	Peña-Amaya	116	139	−16.5%	85.19	1.4/km^{2}
Hurones	Tierras del Cid	53	74	−28.4%	8.29	6.4/km^{2}
Ibeas de Juarros	Comarca del Arlanzón	1,459	1,450	+0.6%	130.27	11.2/km^{2}
Ibrillos	—	29	61	−52.5%	5.64	5.1/km^{2}
Iglesiarrubia	Ribera del Arlanza y del Monte	45	48	−6.2%	15.02	3.0/km^{2}
Iglesias	Campos de Muñó, Pueblos de la Vecindad de Burgos	141	140	+0.7%	34.54	4.1/km^{2}
Isar	Odra-Pisuerga	285	360	−20.8%	66.42	4.3/km^{2}
Itero del Castillo	Peña-Amaya	71	106	−33.0%	16.91	4.2/km^{2}
Jaramillo de la Fuente	Alfoz de Lara, Sierra de Arlanza	47	58	−19.0%	21.56	2.2/km^{2}
Jaramillo Quemado	Alfoz de Lara	10	5	+100.0%	17.45	0.6/km^{2}
Junta de Traslaloma	Norte-Trueba-Jerea	122	154	−20.8%	75.81	1.6/km^{2}
Junta de Villalba de Losa	—	77	106	−27.4%	52.64	1.5/km^{2}
Jurisdicción de Lara	—	41	44	−6.8%	25.04	1.6/km^{2}
Jurisdicción de San Zadornil	—	66	70	−5.7%	30.99	2.1/km^{2}
Lerma	Virgen de Manciles	2,570	2,780	−7.6%	164.69	15.6/km^{2}
Llano de Bureba	Oña-Bureba-Caderecha	49	66	−25.8%	15.19	3.2/km^{2}
Madrigal del Monte	—	144	172	−16.3%	26.88	5.4/km^{2}
Madrigalejo del Monte	Ribera del Arlanza y del Monte	176	187	−5.9%	25.47	6.9/km^{2}
Mahamud	—	105	142	−26.1%	33.61	3.1/km^{2}
Mambrilla de Castrejón	Ribera del Duero-Comarca de Roa	105	106	−0.9%	16.04	6.5/km^{2}
Mambrillas de Lara	Ribera del Arlanza y del Monte	56	55	+1.8%	34.03	1.6/km^{2}
Mamolar	Alfoz de Lara	28	36	−22.2%	18.32	1.5/km^{2}
Manciles	—	21	25	−16.0%	6.58	3.2/km^{2}
Mazuela	Bajo Arlanza	57	67	−14.9%	13.41	4.3/km^{2}
Mecerreyes	Ribera del Arlanza y del Monte	187	295	−36.6%	59.63	3.1/km^{2}
Medina de Pomar	Norte-Trueba-Jerea, Río Egaña	5,979	6,195	−3.5%	214.20	27.9/km^{2}
Melgar de Fernamental	Odra-Pisuerga	1,517	1,803	−15.9%	108.62	14.0/km^{2}
Merindad de Cuesta-Urria	—	270	410	−34.1%	121.97	2.2/km^{2}
Merindad de Montija	Norte-Trueba-Jerea	741	836	−11.4%	100.07	7.4/km^{2}
Merindad de Río Ubierna	Tierras del Cid	1,415	1,423	−0.6%	275.23	5.1/km^{2}
Merindad de Sotoscueva	Noroeste de Burgos	412	465	−11.4%	153.35	2.7/km^{2}
Merindad de Valdeporres	Río Egaña	416	442	−5.9%	120.17	3.5/km^{2}
Merindad de Valdivielso	—	403	431	−6.5%	129.09	3.1/km^{2}
Milagros	Valle de Río Riaza	418	502	−16.7%	22.03	19.0/km^{2}
Miranda de Ebro	—	36,025	38,341	−6.0%	101.20	356.0/km^{2}
Miraveche	—	95	85	+11.8%	22.70	4.2/km^{2}
Modúbar de la Emparedada	Ribera del Río Ausín y zona de San Pedro Cardeña	767	592	+29.6%	11.75	65.3/km^{2}
Monasterio de la Sierra	Alfoz de Lara, Sierra de Arlanza	40	50	−20.0%	5.89	6.8/km^{2}
Monasterio de Rodilla	Tierras del Cid	168	194	−13.4%	37.14	4.5/km^{2}
Moncalvillo	Alfoz de Lara, Sierra de Arlanza	76	102	−25.5%	26.76	2.8/km^{2}
Monterrubio de la Demanda	Alfoz de Lara, Sierra de Arlanza	56	70	−20.0%	15.11	3.7/km^{2}
Montorio	Tierras del Cid	149	172	−13.4%	23.53	6.3/km^{2}
Moradillo de Roa	Valle de Río Riaza	170	194	−12.4%	13.81	12.3/km^{2}
Nava de Roa	Ribera del Duero-Comarca de Roa	199	236	−15.7%	22.35	8.9/km^{2}
Navas de Bureba	—	24	41	−41.5%	8.79	2.7/km^{2}
Nebreda	—	55	74	−25.7%	28.43	1.9/km^{2}
Neila	Alta Sierra de Pinares	119	203	−41.4%	63.12	1.9/km^{2}
Olmedillo de Roa	Ribera del Duero-Comarca de Roa, Ruta del Vino - Afluente Rural	185	190	−2.6%	26.03	7.1/km^{2}
Olmillos de Muñó	Bajo Arlanza	40	41	−2.4%	7.04	5.7/km^{2}
Oña	Oña-Bureba-Caderecha, Raíces de Castilla	953	1,162	−18.0%	161.64	5.9/km^{2}
Oquillas	La Yecla	49	62	−21.0%	14.98	3.3/km^{2}
Orbaneja Riopico	Encuentro de Caminos, Comarca del Arlanzón	350	235	+48.9%	9.34	37.5/km^{2}
Padilla de Abajo	Odra-Pisuerga	69	93	−25.8%	27.76	2.5/km^{2}
Padilla de Arriba	Odra-Pisuerga	92	90	+2.2%	23.12	4.0/km^{2}
Padrones de Bureba	Oña-Bureba-Caderecha	59	51	+15.7%	20.33	2.9/km^{2}
Palacios de la Sierra	Alta Sierra de Pinares	677	789	−14.2%	70.40	9.6/km^{2}
Palacios de Riopisuerga	—	18	33	−45.5%	10.34	1.7/km^{2}
Palazuelos de la Sierra	Comarca del Arlanzón, Ribera del Río Ausín y zona de San Pedro Cardeña, Sierra de Arlanza	93	67	+38.8%	15.74	5.9/km^{2}
Palazuelos de Muñó	Bajo Arlanza, Campos de Muñó	54	60	−10.0%	8.69	6.2/km^{2}
Pampliega	Bajo Arlanza, Campos de Muñó	290	360	−19.4%	24.40	11.9/km^{2}
Pancorbo	Desfiladero y Bureba	437	505	−13.5%	58.45	7.5/km^{2}
Pardilla	Valle de Río Riaza	102	121	−15.7%	15.20	6.7/km^{2}
Partido de la Sierra en Tobalina	Comarca del Ebro-Nela	81	90	−10.0%	29.79	2.7/km^{2}
Pedrosa de Duero	Ribera del Duero-Comarca de Roa	461	459	+0.4%	69.86	6.6/km^{2}
Pedrosa del Páramo	Peña-Amaya	90	99	−9.1%	11.33	7.9/km^{2}
Pedrosa del Príncipe	Peña-Amaya	164	176	−6.8%	28.41	5.8/km^{2}
Pedrosa de Río Úrbel	Tierras del Cid	246	264	−6.8%	49.06	5.0/km^{2}
Peñaranda de Duero	Río Arandilla	464	567	−18.2%	64.53	7.2/km^{2}
Peral de Arlanza	Bajo Arlanza	170	160	+6.3%	29.03	5.9/km^{2}
Piérnigas	—	39	43	−9.3%	13.40	2.9/km^{2}
Pineda de la Sierra	Sierra de la Demanda	94	99	−5.1%	68.77	1.4/km^{2}
Pineda Trasmonte	La Yecla	98	140	−30.0%	28.17	3.5/km^{2}
Pinilla de los Barruecos	Sierra de Arlanza	98	129	−24.0%	32.52	3.0/km^{2}
Pinilla de los Moros	Alfoz de Lara, Sierra de Arlanza	33	41	−19.5%	11.01	3.0/km^{2}
Pinilla Trasmonte	La Yecla	162	192	−15.6%	68.31	2.4/km^{2}
Poza de la Sal	Raíces de Castilla	282	365	−22.7%	81.90	3.4/km^{2}
Prádanos de Bureba	—	56	60	−6.7%	10.79	5.2/km^{2}
Pradoluengo	Sierra de Arlanza, Sierra de la Demanda	1,070	1,376	−22.2%	30.54	35.0/km^{2}
Presencio	Bajo Arlanza, Campos de Muñó	208	186	+11.8%	35.35	5.9/km^{2}
La Puebla de Arganzón	—	558	524	+6.5%	18.85	29.6/km^{2}
Puentedura	Ribera del Arlanza y del Monte	122	133	−8.3%	15.83	7.7/km^{2}
Quemada	Río Arandilla	242	253	−4.3%	20.84	11.6/km^{2}
Quintanabureba	—	31	38	−18.4%	12.36	2.5/km^{2}
Quintana del Pidio	La Yecla	152	179	−15.1%	10.74	14.2/km^{2}
Quintanaélez	—	47	63	−25.4%	17.47	2.7/km^{2}
Quintanaortuño	Tierras del Cid	289	258	+12.0%	5.57	51.9/km^{2}
Quintanapalla	Encuentro de Caminos, Ríos Arlanzón y Vena, Tierras del Cid	123	116	+6.0%	15.87	7.8/km^{2}
Quintanar de la Sierra	Alta Sierra de Pinares	1,502	1,961	−23.4%	59.91	25.1/km^{2}
Quintanavides	—	64	97	−34.0%	11.67	5.5/km^{2}
Quintanilla de la Mata	Ribera del Arlanza y del Monte	108	143	−24.5%	13.64	7.9/km^{2}
Quintanilla del Agua y Tordueles	Ribera del Arlanza y del Monte	337	506	−33.4%	35.79	9.4/km^{2}
Quintanilla del Coco	La Yecla	50	70	−28.6%	20.15	2.5/km^{2}
Las Quintanillas	Pueblos de la Vecindad de Burgos	390	395	−1.3%	24.78	15.7/km^{2}
Quintanilla San García	Las Lomas de Bureba	68	103	−34.0%	45.75	1.5/km^{2}
Quintanilla Vivar	Tierras del Cid	900	780	+15.4%	13.38	67.3/km^{2}
Rabanera del Pinar	Alfoz de Lara	99	118	−16.1%	33.24	3.0/km^{2}
Rábanos	Sierra de Arlanza	79	89	−11.2%	40.64	1.9/km^{2}
Rabé de las Calzadas	Pueblos de la Vecindad de Burgos	254	223	+13.9%	10.11	25.1/km^{2}
Rebolledo de la Torre	Peña-Amaya	91	134	−32.1%	50.51	1.8/km^{2}
Redecilla del Camino	—	94	127	−26.0%	12.10	7.8/km^{2}
Redecilla del Campo	—	67	77	−13.0%	17.20	3.9/km^{2}
Regumiel de la Sierra	Alta Sierra de Pinares	298	387	−23.0%	26.16	11.4/km^{2}
Reinoso	—	18	13	+38.5%	8.51	2.1/km^{2}
Retuerta	Ribera del Arlanza y del Monte	59	74	−20.3%	8.54	6.9/km^{2}
La Revilla y Ahedo	—	101	126	−19.8%	15.29	6.6/km^{2}
Revilla del Campo	Comarca del Arlanzón	94	113	−16.8%	39.04	2.4/km^{2}
Revillarruz	—	654	493	+32.7%	16.98	38.5/km^{2}
Revilla Vallejera	Bajo Arlanza, Campos de Muñó	115	98	+17.3%	27.46	4.2/km^{2}
Rezmondo	Boedo-Ojeda	17	16	+6.3%	6.70	2.5/km^{2}
Riocavado de la Sierra	Alfoz de Lara, Sierra de Arlanza	55	58	−5.2%	43.32	1.3/km^{2}
Roa	Ribera del Duero-Comarca de Roa	2,298	2,451	−6.2%	48.92	47.0/km^{2}
Rojas	Oña-Bureba-Caderecha	58	77	−24.7%	24.93	2.3/km^{2}
Royuela de Río Franco	Bajo Arlanza	171	228	−25.0%	50.61	3.4/km^{2}
Rubena	Ríos Arlanzón y Vena, Tierras del Cid	219	182	+20.3%	9.77	22.4/km^{2}
Rublacedo de Abajo	Oña-Bureba-Caderecha	36	35	+2.9%	39.30	0.9/km^{2}
Rucandio	Oña-Bureba-Caderecha	72	79	−8.9%	32.63	2.2/km^{2}
Salas de Bureba	Oña-Bureba-Caderecha	129	134	−3.7%	13.30	9.7/km^{2}
Salas de los Infantes	Alfoz de Lara	1,988	2,133	−6.8%	31.32	63.5/km^{2}
Saldaña de Burgos	—	202	177	+14.1%	8.15	24.8/km^{2}
Salinillas de Bureba	—	47	51	−7.8%	22.83	2.1/km^{2}
San Adrián de Juarros	Comarca del Arlanzón	86	69	+24.6%	19.89	4.3/km^{2}
San Juan del Monte	Río Arandilla	154	156	−1.3%	26.50	5.8/km^{2}
San Mamés de Burgos	Campos de Muñó	310	305	+1.6%	5.10	60.8/km^{2}
San Martín de Rubiales	Ribera del Duero-Comarca de Roa	139	157	−11.5%	19.40	7.2/km^{2}
San Millán de Lara	Alfoz de Lara	63	73	−13.7%	33.62	1.9/km^{2}
Santa Cecilia	Ribera del Arlanza y del Monte	105	105	0.0%	12.46	8.4/km^{2}
Santa Cruz de la Salceda	Valle de Río Riaza	147	170	−13.5%	25.86	5.7/km^{2}
Santa Cruz del Valle Urbión	Sierra de la Demanda	103	98	+5.1%	33.92	3.0/km^{2}
Santa Gadea del Cid	Desfiladero y Bureba	163	160	+1.9%	29.03	5.6/km^{2}
Santa Inés	Ribera del Arlanza y del Monte	155	134	+15.7%	14.87	10.4/km^{2}
Santa María del Campo	Bajo Arlanza, Campos de Muñó	523	622	−15.9%	60.32	8.7/km^{2}
Santa María del Invierno	Oca-Tirón	67	64	+4.7%	16.18	4.1/km^{2}
Santa María del Mercadillo	La Yecla	108	136	−20.6%	30.21	3.6/km^{2}
Santa María Ribarredonda	Desfiladero y Bureba	97	91	+6.6%	11.76	8.2/km^{2}
Santa Olalla de Bureba	—	38	33	+15.2%	10.74	3.5/km^{2}
Santibáñez de Esgueva	Ribera del Duero-Comarca de Roa	76	118	−35.6%	22.25	3.4/km^{2}
Santibáñez del Val	La Yecla	70	64	+9.4%	14.96	4.7/km^{2}
Santo Domingo de Silos	La Yecla	247	311	−20.6%	78.91	3.1/km^{2}
San Vicente del Valle	La Riojilla Burgalesa, Sierra de la Demanda	28	35	−20.0%	13.42	2.1/km^{2}
Sargentes de la Lora	Páramos y Valles	133	139	−4.3%	86.21	1.5/km^{2}
Sarracín	—	264	275	−4.0%	9.61	27.5/km^{2}
Sasamón	Odra-Pisuerga	912	1,140	−20.0%	113.11	8.1/km^{2}
La Sequera de Haza	Ribera del Duero-Comarca de Roa	27	40	−32.5%	6.84	3.9/km^{2}
Solarana	Virgen de Manciles	78	96	−18.7%	16.51	4.7/km^{2}
Sordillos	Peña-Amaya	22	27	−18.5%	9.71	2.3/km^{2}
Sotillo de la Ribera	Ribera del Duero-Comarca de Roa, Ruta del Vino - Afluente Rural	472	538	−12.3%	42.46	11.1/km^{2}
Sotragero	Tierras del Cid	301	281	+7.1%	5.49	54.8/km^{2}
Sotresgudo	Peña-Amaya	419	515	−18.6%	172.19	2.4/km^{2}
Susinos del Páramo	—	118	115	+2.6%	11.45	10.3/km^{2}
Tamarón	Campos de Muñó, Pueblos de la Vecindad de Burgos	55	44	+25.0%	15.66	3.5/km^{2}
Tardajos	Pueblos de la Vecindad de Burgos	864	834	+3.6%	12.72	67.9/km^{2}
Tejada	La Yecla	35	35	0.0%	22.74	1.5/km^{2}
Terradillos de Esgueva	Ribera del Duero-Comarca de Roa	64	102	−37.3%	14.39	4.4/km^{2}
Tinieblas de la Sierra	Comarca del Arlanzón	25	43	−41.9%	29.38	0.9/km^{2}
Tobar	—	27	29	−6.9%	11.96	2.3/km^{2}
Tordómar	Virgen de Manciles	298	364	−18.1%	30.06	9.9/km^{2}
Torrecilla del Monte	—	79	78	+1.3%	14.93	5.3/km^{2}
Torregalindo	—	123	136	−9.6%	15.36	8.0/km^{2}
Torrelara	Comarca del Arlanzón	32	33	−3.0%	12.51	2.6/km^{2}
Torrepadre	—	67	74	−9.5%	28.56	2.3/km^{2}
Torresandino	Ribera del Duero-Comarca de Roa	573	727	−21.2%	93.20	6.1/km^{2}
Tórtoles de Esgueva	Ribera del Duero-Comarca de Roa	386	508	−24.0%	79.20	4.9/km^{2}
Tosantos	Oca-Tirón	53	53	0.0%	5.74	9.2/km^{2}
Trespaderne	Comarca del Ebro-Nela	713	975	−26.9%	36.81	19.4/km^{2}
Tubilla del Agua	Páramos y Valles	128	172	−25.6%	78.69	1.6/km^{2}
Tubilla del Lago	Río ArandillaRío Arandilla	172	160	+7.5%	23.21	7.4/km^{2}
Úrbel del Castillo	Peña-Amaya	58	94	−38.3%	30.83	1.9/km^{2}
Vadocondes	Río Arandilla	363	389	−6.7%	25.69	14.1/km^{2}
Valdeande	La Yecla	99	104	−4.8%	30.98	3.2/km^{2}
Valdezate	Ribera del Duero-Comarca de Roa	122	153	−20.3%	20.47	6.0/km^{2}
Valdorros	Ribera del Río Ausín y zona de San Pedro Cardeña	376	312	+20.5%	16.64	22.6/km^{2}
Valmala	Sierra de Arlanza, Sierra de la Demanda	26	31	−16.1%	16.97	1.5/km^{2}
Vallarta de Bureba	Desfiladero y Bureba	42	45	−6.7%	19.12	2.2/km^{2}
Valle de Losa	Norte-Trueba-Jerea	496	567	−12.5%	220.67	2.2/km^{2}
Valle de Manzanedo	—	116	155	−25.2%	70.44	1.6/km^{2}
Valle de Mena	—	4,147	3,893	+6.5%	262.69	15.8/km^{2}
Valle de Oca	Oca-Tirón	165	175	−5.7%	38.47	4.3/km^{2}
Valle de Santibáñez	Tierras del Cid	479	516	−7.2%	105.86	4.5/km^{2}
Valle de Sedano	Páramos y Valles	409	479	−14.6%	264.31	1.5/km^{2}
Valle de Tobalina	Comarca del Ebro-Nela	862	992	−13.1%	157.49	5.5/km^{2}
Valle de Valdebezana	Noroeste de Burgos	488	553	−11.8%	156.62	3.1/km^{2}
Valle de Valdelaguna	Alfoz de Lara, Sierra de Arlanza	190	200	−5.0%	92.66	2.1/km^{2}
Valle de Valdelucio	Peña-Amaya	328	347	−5.5%	95.79	3.4/km^{2}
Valle de Zamanzas	—	45	70	−35.7%	19.27	2.3/km^{2}
Valle de las Navas	Tierras del Cid	541	595	−9.1%	111.83	4.8/km^{2}
Vallejera	Bajo Arlanza	39	42	−7.1%	18.32	2.1/km^{2}
Valles de Palenzuela	Bajo Arlanza	75	86	−12.8%	20.87	3.6/km^{2}
Valluércanes	Desfiladero y Bureba	62	80	−22.5%	27.95	2.2/km^{2}
La Vid de Bureba	Desfiladero y Bureba	24	24	0.0%	9.75	2.5/km^{2}
La Vid y Barrios	Río Arandilla	245	285	−14.0%	37.58	6.5/km^{2}
Vileña	—	27	34	−20.6%	6.35	4.3/km^{2}
Villarcayo de Merindad de Castilla la Vieja	Río Egaña	4,043	4,615	−12.4%	151.27	26.7/km^{2}
Viloria de Rioja	—	37	50	−26.0%	6.95	5.3/km^{2}
Vilviestre del Pinar	Alta Sierra de Pinares	504	650	−22.5%	33.90	14.9/km^{2}
Villadiego	Peña-Amaya	1,455	1,695	−14.2%	327.96	4.4/km^{2}
Villaescusa de Roa	Ribera del Duero-Comarca de Roa	92	127	−27.6%	17.50	5.3/km^{2}
Villaescusa la Sombría	La Riojilla Burgalesa	59	69	−14.5%	16.24	3.6/km^{2}
Villaespasa	Ribera del Arlanza y del Monte	22	18	+22.2%	19.49	1.1/km^{2}
Villafranca Montes de Oca	Oca-Tirón	122	131	−6.9%	52.45	2.3/km^{2}
Villafruela	Ribera del Arlanza y del Monte	143	226	−36.7%	52.01	2.7/km^{2}
Villagalijo	Sierra de Arlanza, Sierra de la Demanda	52	71	−26.8%	22.07	2.4/km^{2}
Villagonzalo Pedernales	Ribera del Río Ausín y zona de San Pedro Cardeña	1,879	1,663	+13.0%	13.82	136.0/km^{2}
Villahoz	—	277	349	−20.6%	50.53	5.5/km^{2}
Villalba de Duero	Ribera del Duero-Comarca de Roa	709	677	+4.7%	13.75	51.6/km^{2}
Villalbilla de Burgos	Pueblos de la Vecindad de Burgos	1,522	1,182	+28.8%	14.45	105.3/km^{2}
Villalbilla de Gumiel	La Yecla	74	104	−28.8%	26.41	2.8/km^{2}
Villaldemiro	Campos de Muñó, Pueblos de la Vecindad de Burgos	91	75	+21.3%	13.43	6.8/km^{2}
Villalmanzo	Ribera del Arlanza y del Monte	408	434	−6.0%	23.91	17.1/km^{2}
Villamayor de los Montes	—	166	222	−25.2%	40.42	4.1/km^{2}
Villamayor de Treviño	Peña-Amaya	56	85	−34.1%	18.75	3.0/km^{2}
Villambistia	Oca-Tirón	44	46	−4.3%	13.07	3.4/km^{2}
Villamedianilla	Bajo Arlanza	9	11	−18.2%	6.76	1.3/km^{2}
Villamiel de la Sierra	Comarca del Arlanzón, Sierra de Arlanza	43	37	+16.2%	17.91	2.4/km^{2}
Villangómez	Bajo Arlanza	231	252	−8.3%	38.35	6.0/km^{2}
Villanueva de Argaño	Pueblos de la Vecindad de Burgos	122	113	+8.0%	7.92	15.4/km^{2}
Villanueva de Carazo	Sierra de Arlanza	27	32	−15.6%	7.38	3.7/km^{2}
Villanueva de Gumiel	La Yecla	279	298	−6.4%	22.33	12.5/km^{2}
Villanueva de Teba	—	42	48	−12.5%	6.12	6.9/km^{2}
Villaquirán de la Puebla	Peña-Amaya	46	50	−8.0%	11.48	4.0/km^{2}
Villaquirán de los Infantes	Campos de Muñó, Pueblos de la Vecindad de Burgos	141	148	−4.7%	12.98	10.9/km^{2}
Villariezo	Ribera del Río Ausín y zona de San Pedro Cardeña	722	565	+27.8%	10.24	70.5/km^{2}
Villasandino	—	178	210	−15.2%	43.71	4.1/km^{2}
Villasur de Herreros	Comarca del Arlanzón, Ríos Arlanzón y Vena, Sierra de Arlanza	274	271	+1.1%	87.80	3.1/km^{2}
Villatuelda	Ribera del Duero-Comarca de Roa	53	47	+12.8%	15.30	3.5/km^{2}
Villaverde del Monte	—	108	149	−27.5%	37.30	2.9/km^{2}
Villaverde-Mogina	Bajo Arlanza	75	79	−5.1%	13.55	5.5/km^{2}
Villayerno Morquillas	Tierras del Cid	205	216	−5.1%	10.49	19.5/km^{2}
Villazopeque	Campos de Muñó, Pueblos de la Vecindad de Burgos	52	61	−14.8%	11.73	4.4/km^{2}
Villegas	Peña-Amaya	79	100	−21.0%	24.59	3.2/km^{2}
Villoruebo	Comarca del Arlanzón	63	93	−32.3%	25.75	2.4/km^{2}
Vizcaínos	Alfoz de Lara, Sierra de Arlanza	40	55	−27.3%	11.48	3.5/km^{2}
Zael	—	116	116	0.0%	18.76	6.2/km^{2}
Zarzosa de Río Pisuerga	Boedo-Ojeda	31	34	−8.8%	10.81	2.9/km^{2}
Zazuar	Ribera del Duero-Comarca de Roa	209	256	−18.4%	22.58	9.3/km^{2}
Zuñeda	Desfiladero y Bureba	57	62	−8.1%	12.14	4.7/km^{2}
Province of Burgos	—	359,740	372,538	−3.4%	14,021.65	25.7/km^{2}
Castile and León	—	2,391,682	2,540,188	−5.8%	93,864.10	25.5/km^{2}
Spain	—	48,619,695	46,815,916	+3.9%	504,755.17	96.3/km^{2}

== See also ==
- Geography of Spain
- List of municipalities of Spain
