= Villaquirán =

Villaquirán may refer to:

- Villaquirán de la Puebla, municipality located in the province of Burgos, Castile and León, Spain
- Villaquirán de los Infantes, municipality located in the province of Burgos, Castile and León, Spain
