= Gumiel =

Gumiel may refer to any of the following four municipalities located in the province of Burgos, Castile and León, Spain:

- Gumiel de Izán
- Gumiel de Mercado
- Villalbilla de Gumiel
- Villanueva de Gumiel
