= Iglesiarrubia =

- Municipality
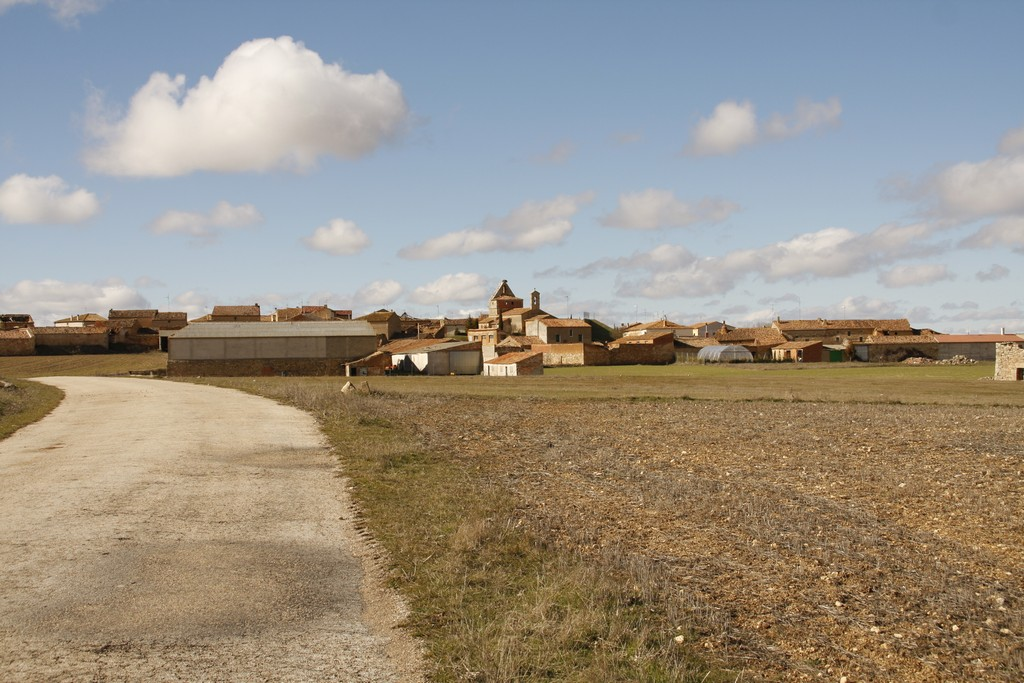
- View of Iglesiarrubia, 2010

- Coat of arms

- Location Iglesiarrubia (Spain)
- Coordinates: 41°58′27″N 3°50′48″W
- Country: Spain
- Autonomous community: Castile and León
- Comarca: Arlanza
- Municipality: Iglesiarrubia

Area
  - Total: 15 km^{2} (5.8 sq mi)
- Elevation: 880 m (2,890 ft)

Population (2025-01-01)
  - Total: 45
  - Density: 3.0/km^{2} (7.8/sq mi)
- Time zone: UTC+1 (CET)
  - Summer (DST): UTC+2 (CEST)
- Postal code: 09345
- Website: http://www.iglesiarrubia.es/

Iglesiarrubia is a municipality located in the province of Burgos, Castile and León, Spain. According to the 2014 census (INE), the municipality had a population of 41.
