= Villayerno Morquillas =

Villayerno Morquillas, Spain
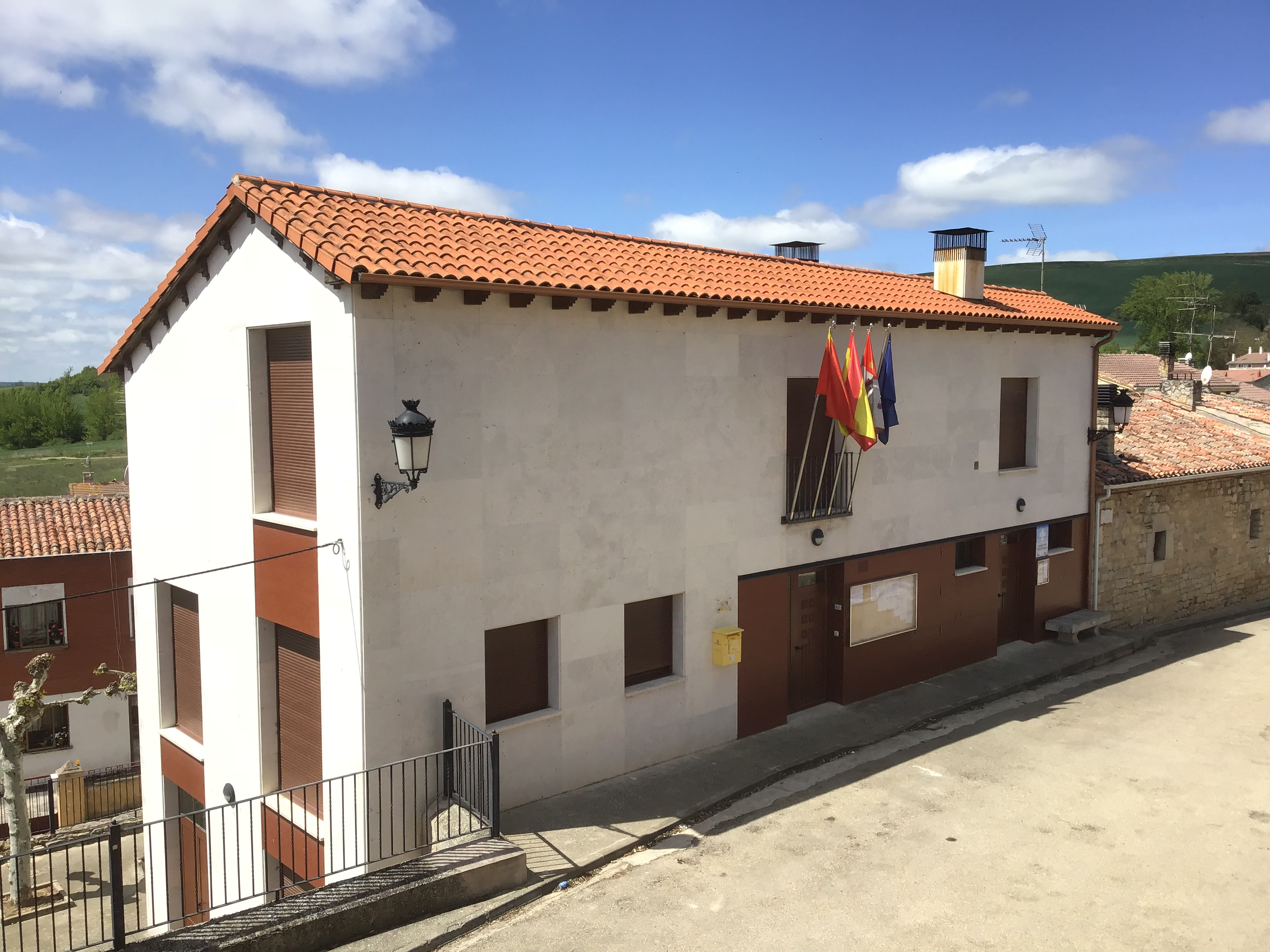
- Town hall

- Flag Coat of arms

- Location within Spain
- Coordinates: 42.3953°N 3.6394°W
- Country: Spain
- Autonomous community: Castile and León
- Province: Burgos
- Municipality: Villayerno Morquillas

Area
  - Total: 9 km^{2} (3.5 sq mi)

Population (2025-01-01)
  - Total: 208
  - Density: 23/km^{2} (60/sq mi)
- Time zone: UTC+1 (CET)
  - Summer (DST): UTC+2 (CEST)

Villayerno Morquillas is a municipality located in the province of Burgos, Castile and León, Spain. According to the 2004 census (INE), the municipality has a population of 191 inhabitants.
