= Vallejera =

- Flag Coat of arms

- Location in Spain
- Coordinates: 42.1828°N 4.1522°W
- Country: Spain
- Autonomous community: Castile and León
- Province: Burgos
- Municipality: Vallejera

Area
  - Total: 18 km^{2} (6.9 sq mi)

Population (2025-01-01)
  - Total: 38
  - Density: 2.1/km^{2} (5.5/sq mi)
- Time zone: UTC+1 (CET)
  - Summer (DST): UTC+2 (CEST)

Vallejera is a municipality located in the province of Burgos, Castile and León, Spain. According to the 2004 census (INE), the municipality has a population of 55 inhabitants.
