= Zarzosa de Río Pisuerga =

Zarzosa de Río Pisuerga, Spain
- Location in Spain
- Coordinates: 42.5333°N 4.2667°W
- Country: Spain
- Autonomous community: Castile and León
- Province: Burgos
- Municipality: Zarzosa de Río Pisuerga

Area
  - Total: 10 km^{2} (3.9 sq mi)

Population (2025-01-01)
  - Total: 29
  - Density: 2.9/km^{2} (7.5/sq mi)
- Time zone: UTC+1 (CET)
  - Summer (DST): UTC+2 (CEST)

Zarzosa de Río Pisuerga (Spanish pronunciation: [θaɾˈθosa ðe ˈri.o piˈsweɾɣa]) is a municipality located in the province of Burgos, Castile and León, Spain. According to the 2004 census (INE), the municipality has a population of 52 inhabitants.

== Recent history ==
On 11 August 2012, six people (3 young women and 3 children), residents of Zarzosa, who had been to the fiesta of San Llorente de la Vega (12 km away), were on their way back by car to their homes in Zarzosa. When they came to the bridge over the Castile Canal close to Naveros de Pisuerga, the car left the road and fell into the lock on the Castile Canal, where all 6 were drowned.

The protective barricades which should have prevented this tragedy did not meet the regulations and were not correctly fixed to the ground.

=== Medieval and modern history ===
Zarzosa is mentioned for the first time in a document from the year 969. This document is the deed of donation of the monastery of Santa Columba of Zarzosa by its owners, Félix Gutiérrez and his wife Elvira, to the abbot of the monastery of Rezmondo.

A century later, in 1071, the king of Castile, Sancho II the Strong, delivered to Bermudo Sendínez the monastery of Rezmondo with its subsidiary houses of Santa Columba of Zarzosa and San Miguel of Támara.

In 1073, Bermudo Sendínez entered the monastery of San Pedro of Cardeña and donated to it the monastery of Rezmondo and the dependent houses of Santa Columba of Zarzosa and San Miguel de Támara.

In 1514 Zarzosa council bought from the monastery of San Pedro of Cardeña all its properties in Zarzosa, properties which had belonged to the ancient monastery of Santa Columba, including the mill which from then on and for centuries formed part of the assets of Zarzosa council.

Zarzosa council had “since time immemorial” enjoyed the privilege of jurisdictional immunity: the king’s officials could not enter with authority to command or make orders of jurisdiction in Zarzosa council or within its boundaries. Several nearby councils also enjoyed the same privilege of immunity: Castrillo de Riopisuerga, Olmos de Pisuerga, Tagarrosa and Valtierra de Riopisuerga. We do not know since when or why these council immunities were granted, but one hypothesis is that they were possibly related with the proximity of the frontier with the Cantabrians. If that were so, these immunities could be much older than they are generally thought to be. The jurisdictional immunity of Zarzosa appears confirmed enshrined in the Firm Judgement of Villazgo (1571)

Zarzosa was a “behetría de mar a mar” belonging to the Local District of Monzón de Campos. Due to this status, Zarzosa council could choose their lord and dismiss him and change him as often as they wanted. The Judgment of Villazgo of Zarzosa contains various allusions to this status as “behetría de mar a mar”, with freedom to elect the lord, and there are various documents in which Zarzosa council commends itself to the Condestables of Castile and others in which it removes itself from that lordship, in exercising its rights as “behetría de mar a mar”. A royal judgement of Philip II in 1571 declared Zarzosa a municipality with its “civil and criminal jurisdiction, high, low, mere or mixed political authority, with all its tributes and taxes and all the rest of the lordship and jurisdiction in that municipality through belonging to His Majesty and the crown”.

According to the ancient Ordinances of the Town Council (1725), Zarzosa was a town whose residents were all taxpayers and where the nobles or hidalgos were prohibited from taking up residence. This prohibition, which also existed in other urban centres of Castile, probably has to do with that character of “behetría de mar a mar”. “Behetría” is understood as the town or place which does not admit, or consent, to hidalgos or nobles in its vicinity, as can be seen from the Dictionary of Authorities of the R.A.E. (1726–1739)
