= Villanueva de Argaño =

Coordinates: 42°23′N 3°56′W

Villanueva de Argaño, Spain
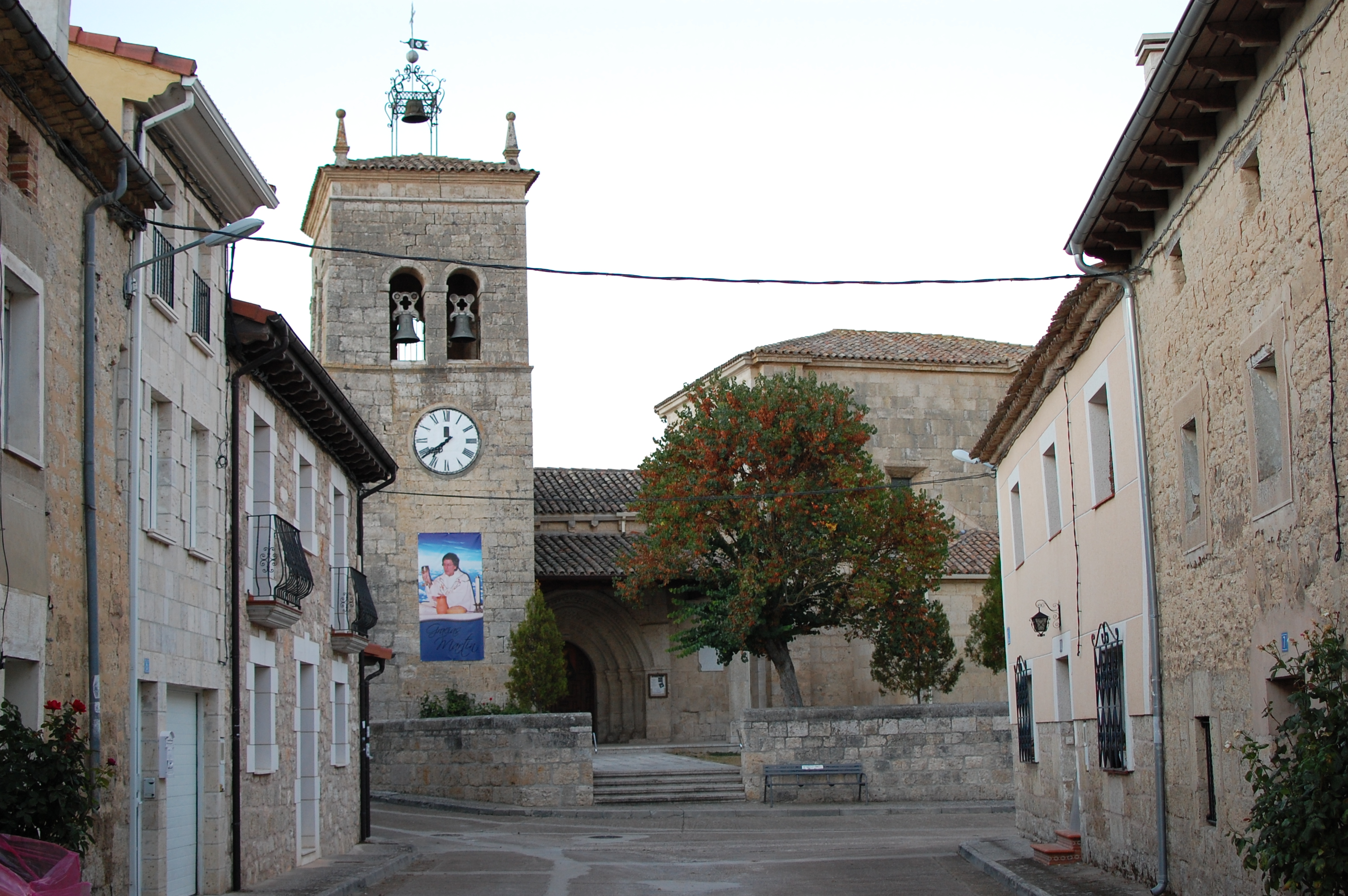
- Church of Villanueva de Argaño

- Flag Coat of arms
- Interactive map of Villanueva de Argaño, Spain
- Country: Spain
- Autonomous community: Castile and León
- Province: Burgos
- Municipality: Villanueva de Argaño

Area
  - Total: 7 km^{2} (2.7 sq mi)

Population (2025-01-01)
  - Total: 117
  - Density: 17/km^{2} (43/sq mi)
- Time zone: UTC+1 (CET)
  - Summer (DST): UTC+2 (CEST)

Villanueva de Argaño is a municipality located in the province of Burgos, Castile and León, Spain. According to the 2004 census (INE), the municipality has a population of 126 inhabitants.
