= Valle de Santibáñez =

Coordinates: 42°28′57.8″N 3°49′20.9″W

Valle de Santibáñez, Spain
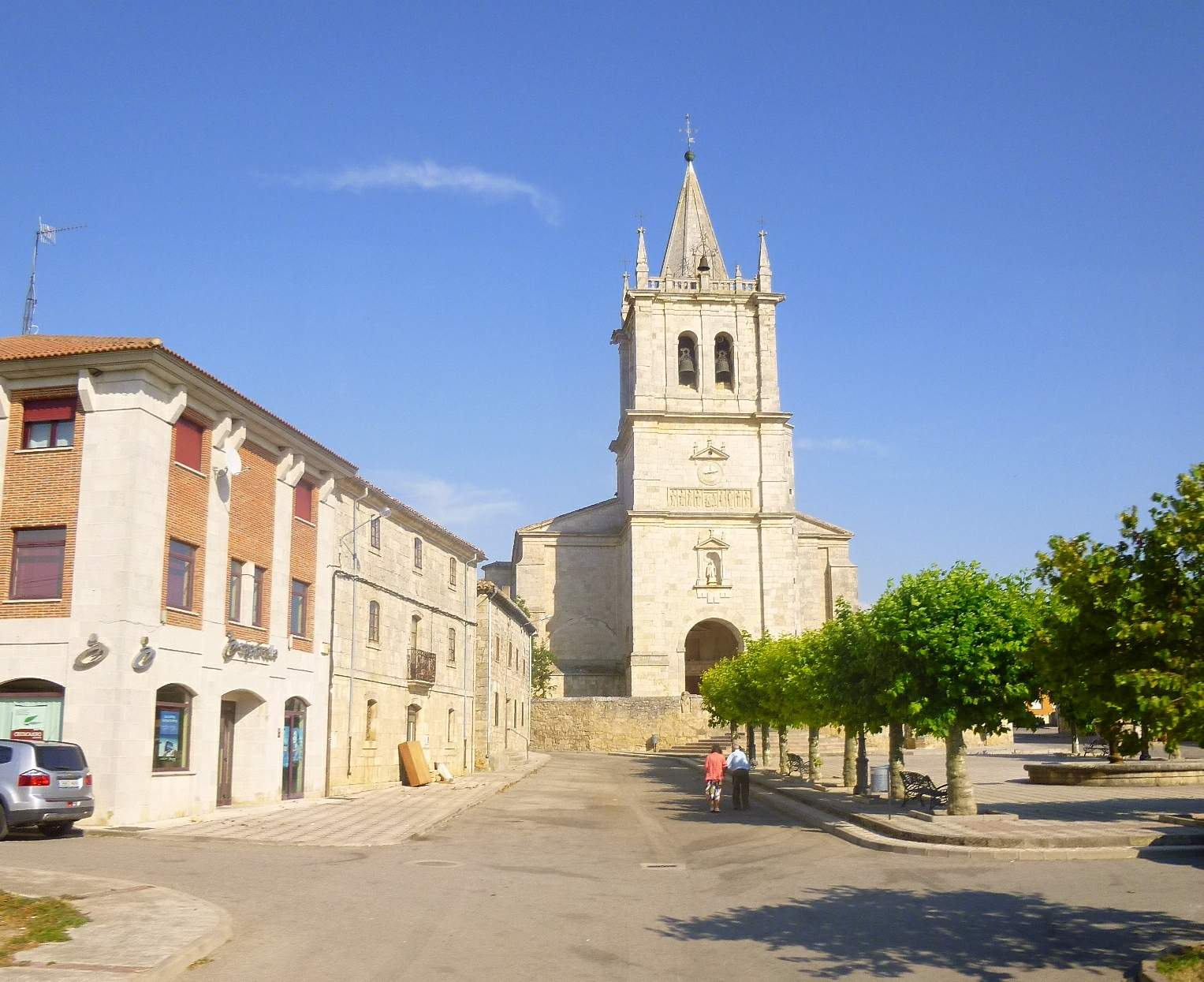
- church of Valle de Santibáñez

- Flag Coat of arms
- Interactive map of Valle de Santibáñez, Spain
- Country: Spain
- Autonomous community: Castile and León
- Province: Burgos
- Municipality: Valle de Santibáñez

Area
  - Total: 105 km^{2} (41 sq mi)

Population (2025-01-01)
  - Total: 482
  - Density: 4.59/km^{2} (11.9/sq mi)
- Time zone: UTC+1 (CET)
  - Summer (DST): UTC+2 (CEST)

Valle de Santibáñez is a municipality located in the province of Burgos, Castile and León, Spain. According to the 2004 census (INE), the municipality has a population of 572 inhabitants.
