= Fuentespina =

Coordinates: 41°38′N 3°41′W

- Municipality
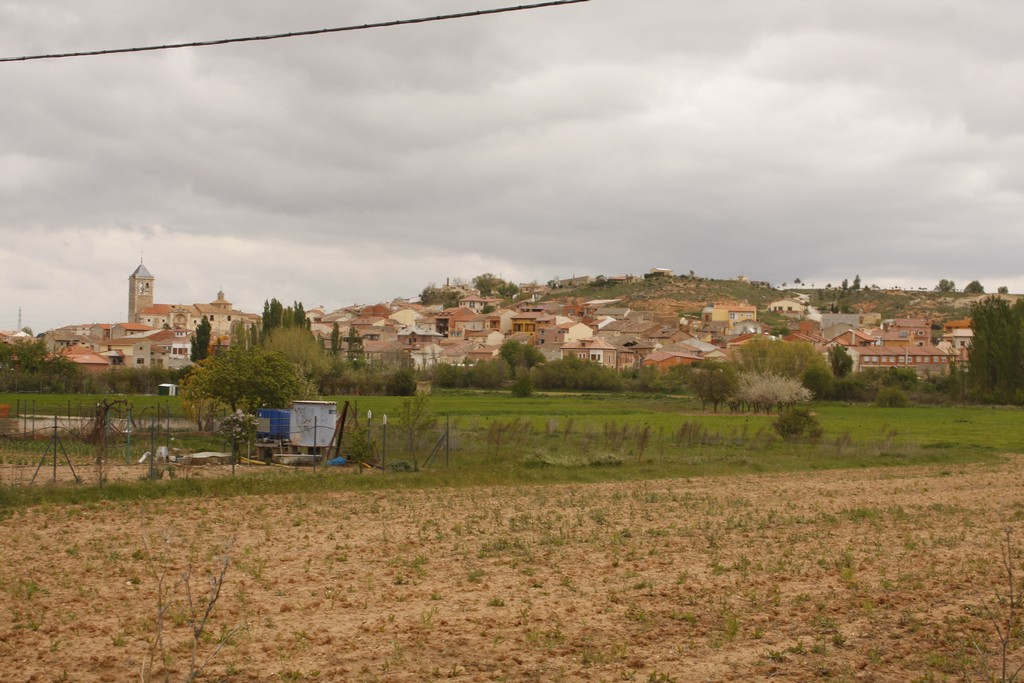
- View of Fuentespina, 2010

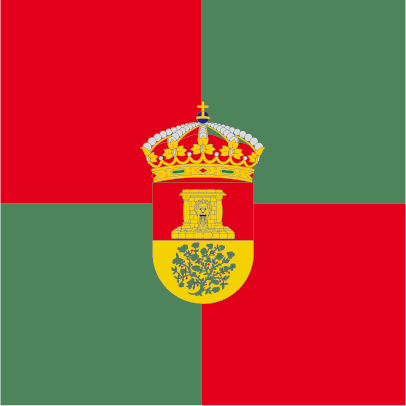
- Flag Coat of arms
- Interactive map of Fuentespina
- Country: Spain
- Autonomous community: Castile and León
- Province: Burgos
- Comarca: Ribera del Duero
- Municipality: Fuentespina

Area
  - Total: 12 km^{2} (4.6 sq mi)
- Elevation: 831 m (2,726 ft)

Population (2025-01-01)
  - Total: 833
  - Density: 69/km^{2} (180/sq mi)
- Time zone: UTC+1 (CET)
  - Summer (DST): UTC+2 (CEST)
- Postal code: 09471
- Website: http://www.fuentespina.es/

Fuentespina is a municipality located in the province of Burgos, Castile and León, Spain. According to the 2004 census (INE), the municipality had a population of 663 inhabitants.

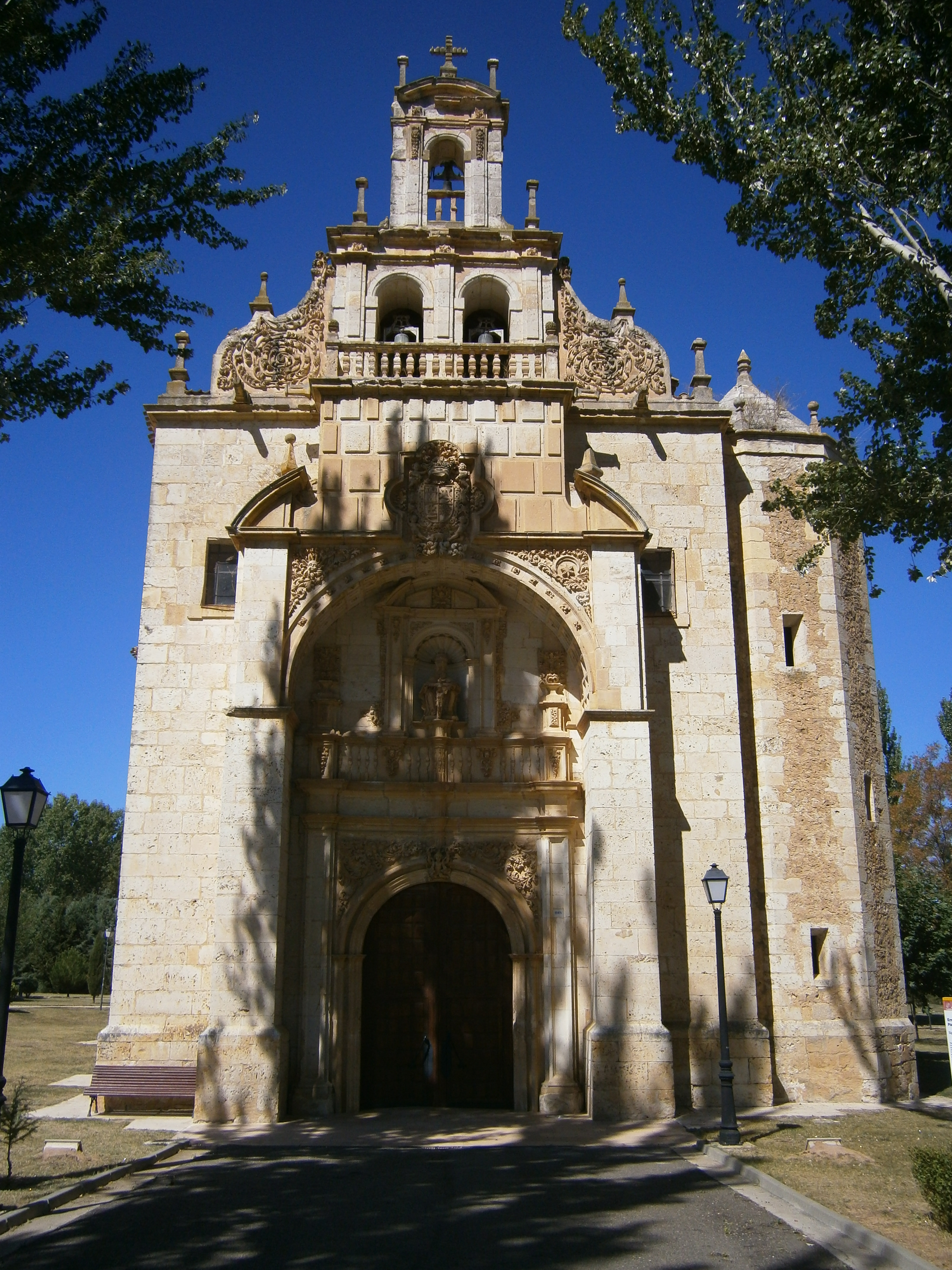
Santísima Trinidad shrine (18th century)
