= Valluércanes =

Coordinates: 42°34′N 3°07′W

Valluércanes, Spain
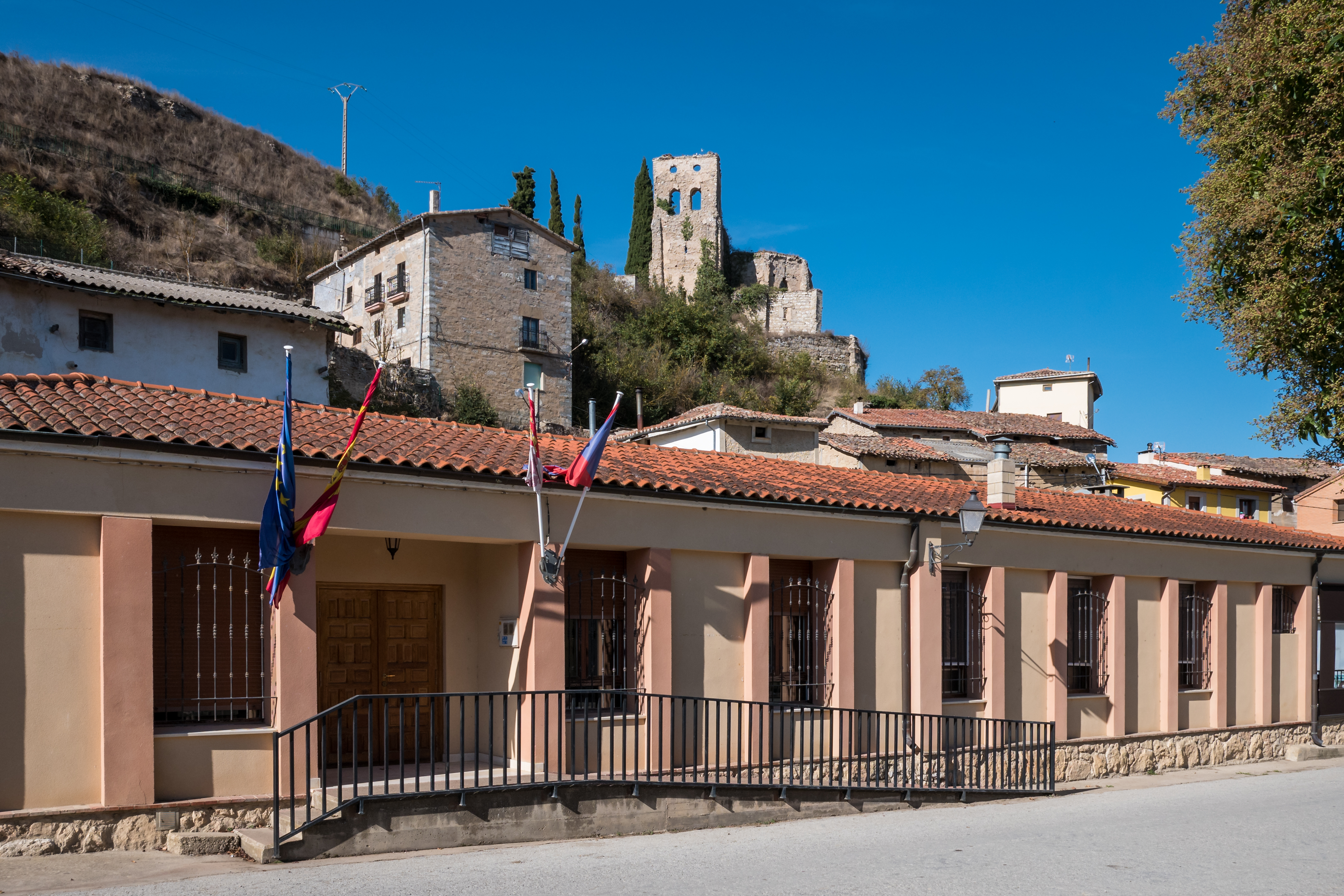
- Valluércanes Town Hall

- Flag Coat of arms
- Interactive map of Valluércanes, Spain
- Country: Spain
- Autonomous community: Castile and León
- Province: Burgos
- Municipality: Valluércanes

Area
  - Total: 27 km^{2} (10 sq mi)

Population (2025-01-01)
  - Total: 70
  - Density: 2.6/km^{2} (6.7/sq mi)
- Time zone: UTC+1 (CET)
  - Summer (DST): UTC+2 (CEST)

Valluércanes is a municipality located in the province of Burgos, Castile and León, Spain. According to the 2004 census (INE), the municipality had a population of 105 inhabitants.
