= Valdezate =

Coordinates: 41°36′N 3°55′W

- municipality
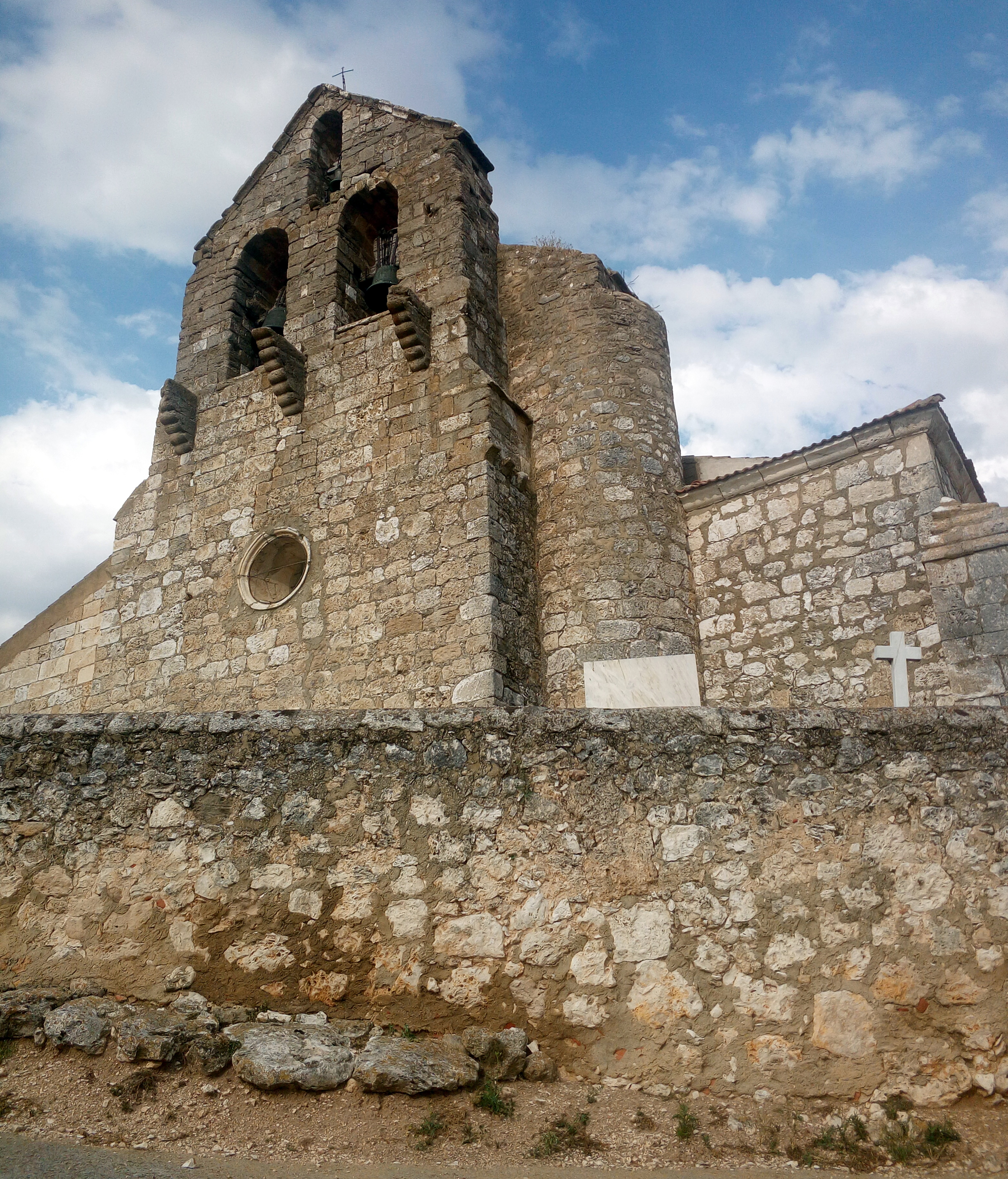
- Church of Valdezate

- Coat of arms
- Interactive map of Valdezate
- Country: Spain
- Autonomous community: Castile and León
- Province: Burgos

Area
  - Total: 20 km^{2} (7.7 sq mi)

Population (2025-01-01)
  - Total: 115
  - Density: 5.8/km^{2} (15/sq mi)
- Time zone: UTC+1 (CET)
  - Summer (DST): UTC+2 (CEST)

Valdezate is a municipality located in the province of Burgos, Castile and León, Spain. According to the 2004 census (INE), the municipality has a population of 179 inhabitants.
