= Villaverde-Mogina =

Coordinates: 42°09′N 4°03′W

- municipality
- Coat of arms
- Interactive map of Villaverde-Mogina
- Country: Spain
- Autonomous community: Castile and León
- Province: Burgos

Area
  - Total: 13 km^{2} (5.0 sq mi)

Population (2025-01-01)
  - Total: 68
  - Density: 5.2/km^{2} (14/sq mi)
- Time zone: UTC+1 (CET)
  - Summer (DST): UTC+2 (CEST)

Villaverde-Mogina is a municipality located in the province of Burgos, Castile and León, Spain. According to the 2004 census (INE), the municipality has a population of 109 inhabitants.

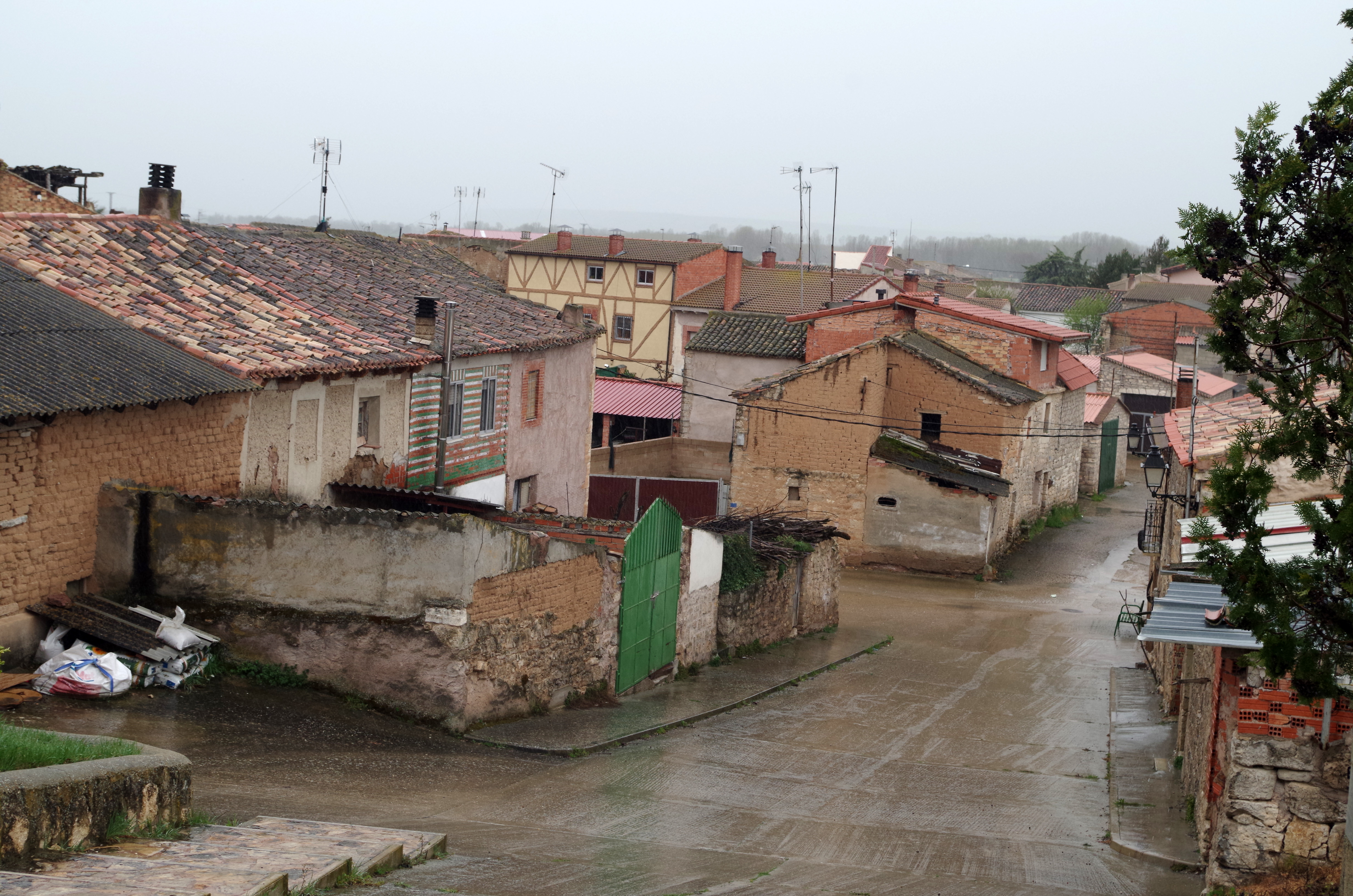
Street of Villaverde-Mogina
