= Villanueva de Carazo =

Coordinates: 41°59′N 3°19′W

- municipality
- Flag Coat of arms
- Interactive map of Villanueva de Carazo
- Country: Spain
- Autonomous community: Castile and León
- Province: Burgos

Area
  - Total: 7 km^{2} (2.7 sq mi)

Population (2025-01-01)
  - Total: 24
  - Density: 3.4/km^{2} (8.9/sq mi)
- Time zone: UTC+1 (CET)
  - Summer (DST): UTC+2 (CEST)

Villanueva de Carazo is a municipality located in the province of Burgos, Castile and León, Spain. According to the 2004 census (INE), the municipality has a population of 30 inhabitants.

About 16 kilometres (10 mi) northwest, over a steep mountain range, lies a valley in which the climactic cemetery scene in The Good, the Bad, and the Ugly was filmed. There are a few signs attesting to this, and the site is popular among tourists.
