= Villoruebo =

Coordinates: 42°10′N 3°26′W

- municipality
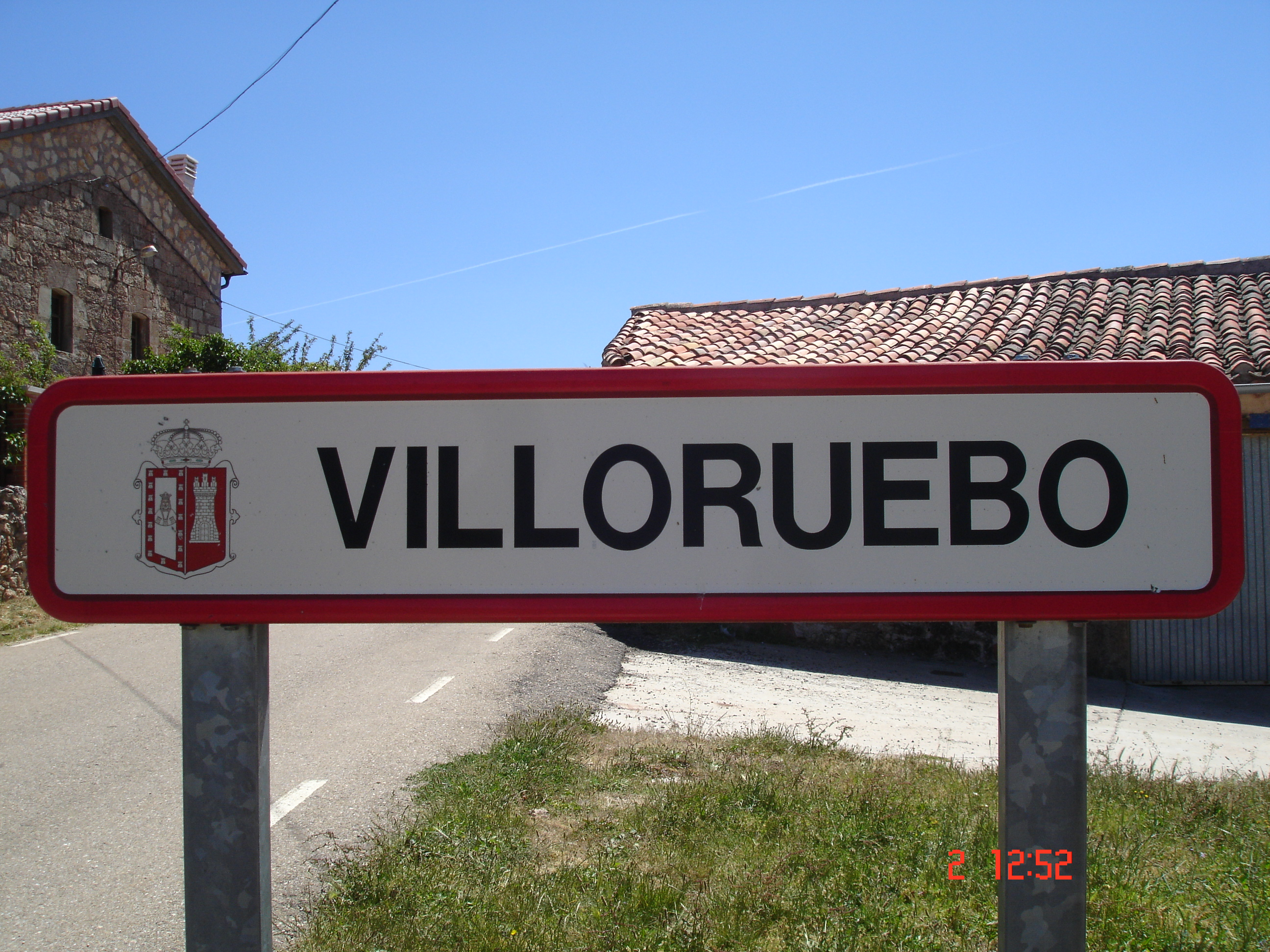
- Interactive map of Villoruebo
- Country: Spain
- Autonomous community: Castile and León
- Province: Burgos

Area
  - Total: 25 km^{2} (9.7 sq mi)

Population (2025-01-01)
  - Total: 62
  - Density: 2.5/km^{2} (6.4/sq mi)
- Time zone: UTC+1 (CET)
  - Summer (DST): UTC+2 (CEST)

Villoruebo is a municipality located in the province of Burgos, Castile and León, Spain. According to the 2004 census (INE), the municipality has a population of 64 inhabitants.
