= Villalbilla de Gumiel =

Coordinates: 41°48′N 3°37′W

- Coat of arms
- Interactive map of Villalbilla de Gumiel
- Country: Spain
- Autonomous community: Castile and León
- Province: Burgos
- Municipality: Villalbilla de Gumiel

Area
  - Total: 26 km^{2} (10 sq mi)
- Elevation: 916 m (3,005 ft)

Population (2025-01-01)
  - Total: 73
  - Density: 2.8/km^{2} (7.3/sq mi)
- Time zone: UTC+1 (CET)
  - Summer (DST): UTC+2 (CEST)

Villalbilla de Gumiel is a municipality located in the province of Burgos, Castile and León, Spain. According to the 2001 census (INE), the municipality has a population of 127 inhabitants.
