= Valles de Palenzuela =

Coordinates: 42°07′N 4°04′W

- municipality
- Coat of arms
- Interactive map of Valles de Palenzuela
- Country: Spain
- Autonomous community: Castile and León
- Province: Burgos

Area
  - Total: 20 km^{2} (7.7 sq mi)

Population (2025-01-01)
  - Total: 74
  - Density: 3.7/km^{2} (9.6/sq mi)
- Time zone: UTC+1 (CET)
  - Summer (DST): UTC+2 (CEST)

Valles de Palenzuela is a municipality located in the province of Burgos, Castile and León, Spain. According to the 2004 census (INE), the municipality has a population of 103 inhabitants.

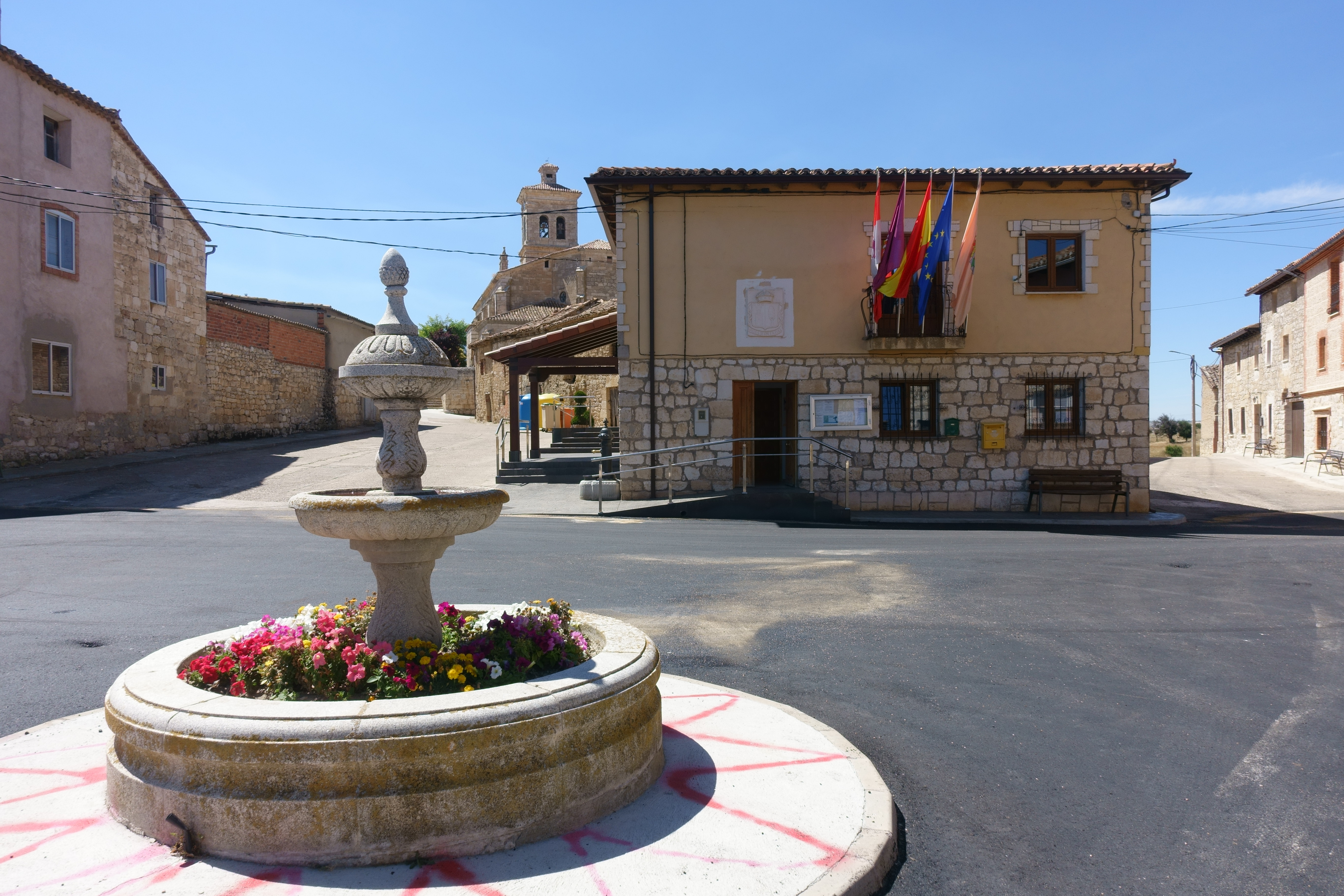
Town Hall of Valles de Palenzuela
