= Villamedianilla =

Coordinates: 42°10′N 4°08′W

- Municipality
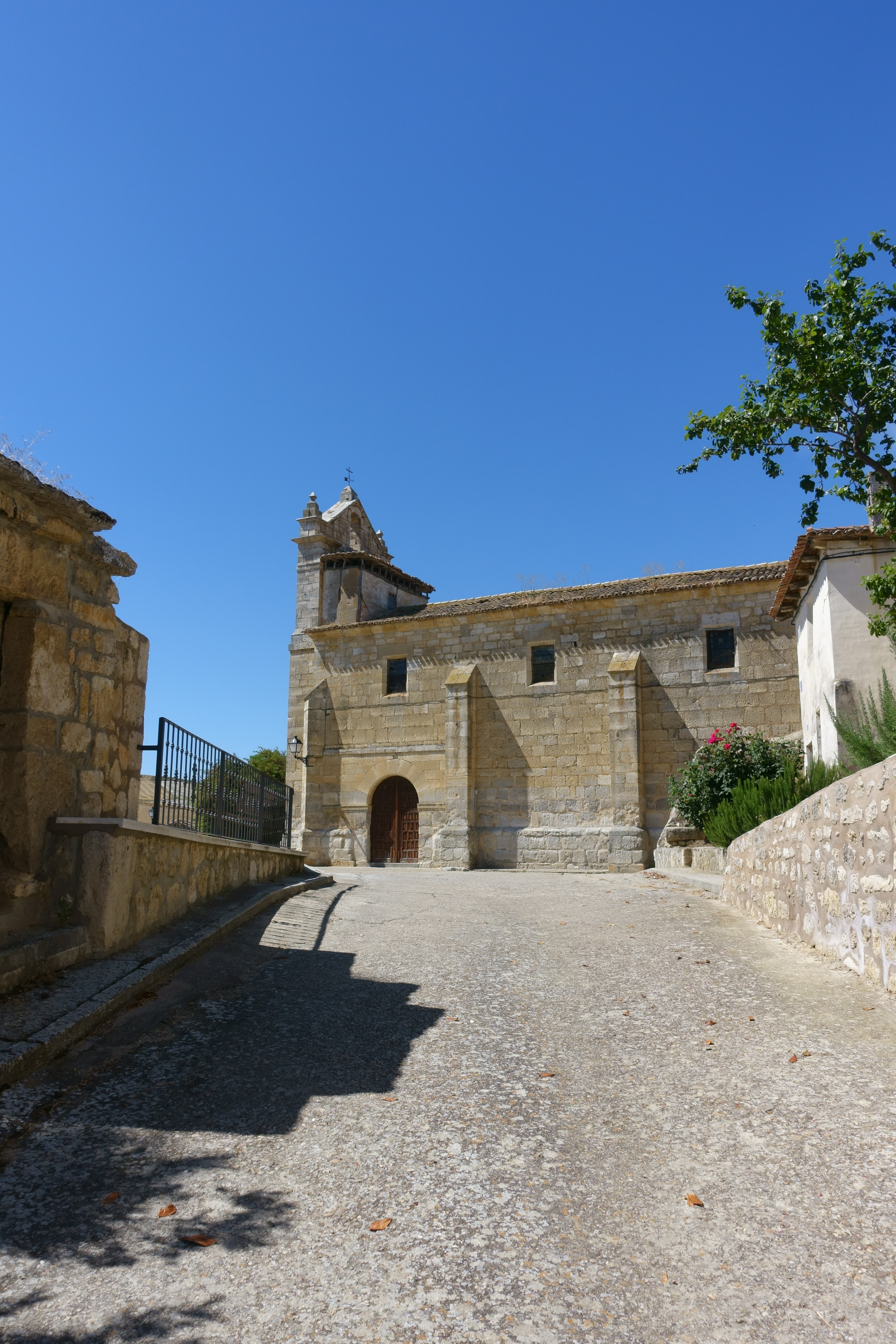
- Church of San Pedro Apóstol in Villamedianilla

- Coat of arms
- Interactive map of Villamedianilla
- Country: Spain
- Autonomous community: Castile and León
- Province: Burgos

Area
  - Total: 6.758 km^{2} (2.609 sq mi)

Population (2025-01-01)
  - Total: 9
  - Density: 1.3/km^{2} (3.4/sq mi)
- Time zone: UTC+1 (CET)
  - Summer (DST): UTC+2 (CEST)

Villamedianilla is a municipality located in the province of Burgos, Castile and León, Spain. According to the 2004 census (INE), the municipality had a population of 24 inhabitants.
