= Tórtoles de Esgueva =

Coordinates: 41°49′N 4°01′W

- municipality
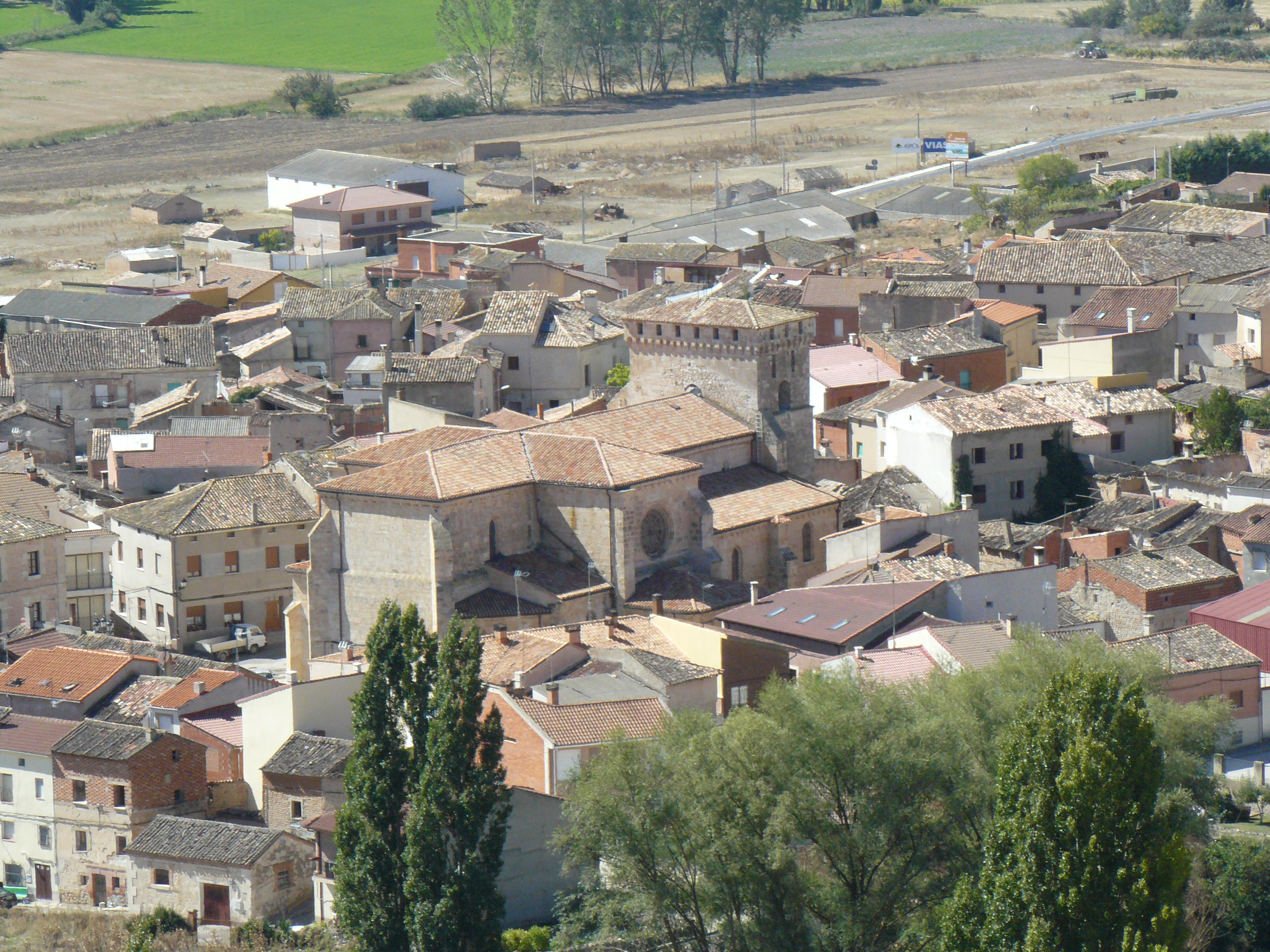
- View of Tórtoles de Esgueva
- Interactive map of Tórtoles de Esgueva
- Country: Spain
- Autonomous community: Castile and León
- Province: Burgos

Area
  - Total: 79 km^{2} (31 sq mi)

Population (2025-01-01)
  - Total: 362
  - Density: 4.6/km^{2} (12/sq mi)
- Time zone: UTC+1 (CET)
  - Summer (DST): UTC+2 (CEST)

Tórtoles de Esgueva is a municipality located in the province of Burgos, Castile and León, Spain. According to the 2004 census (INE), the municipality has a population of 529 inhabitants.
