= Cantabrana =

Coordinates: 42°44′N 3°28′W

- municipality
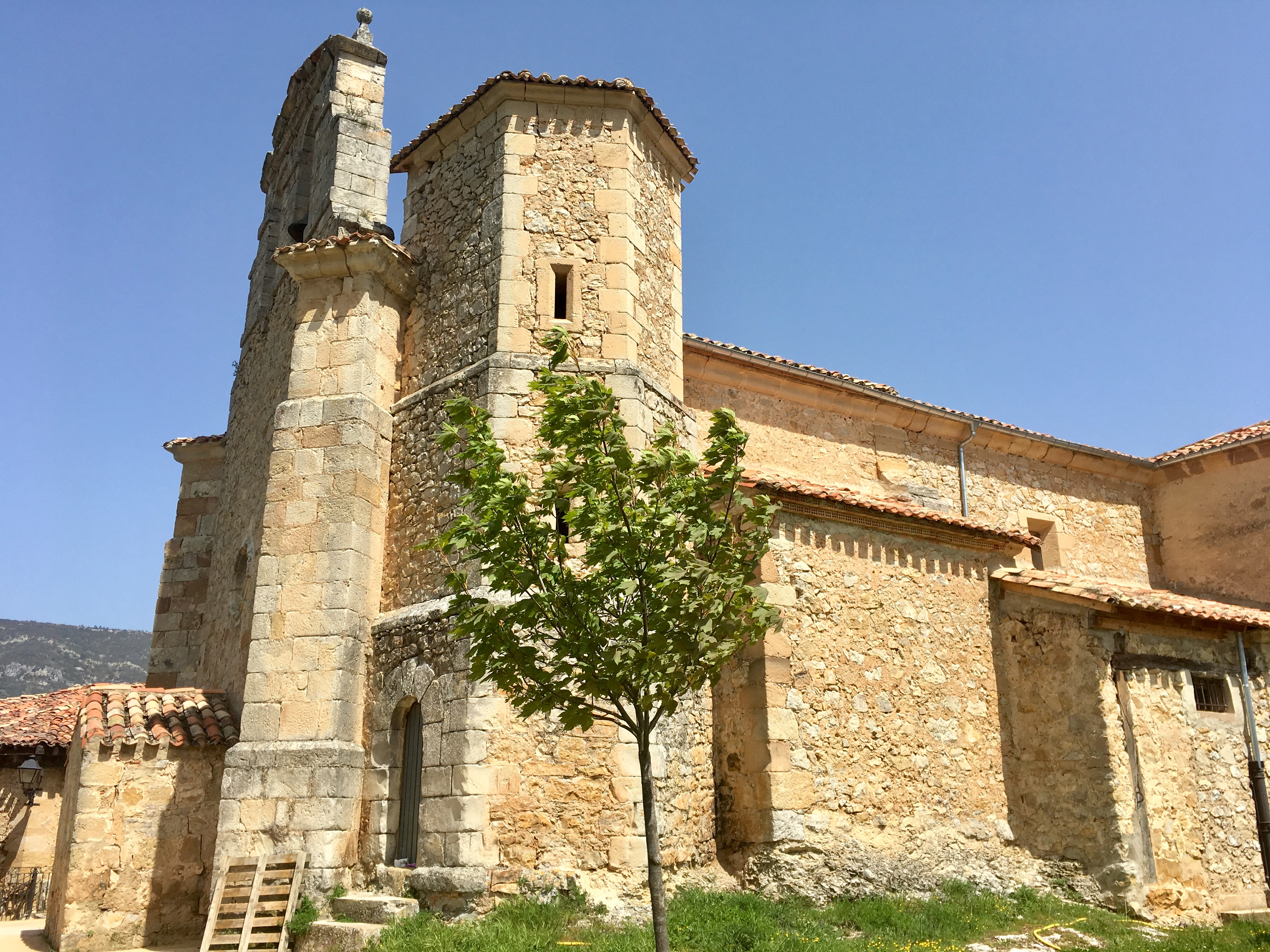
- Parish church of Cantabrana

- Flag Coat of arms

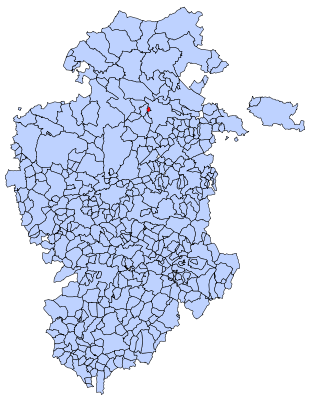
- Municipal location of Cantabrana in Burgos province
- Country: Spain
- Autonomous community: Castile and León
- Province: Burgos
- Comarca: La Bureba

Area
  - Total: 3 km^{2} (1.2 sq mi)
- Elevation: 639 m (2,096 ft)

Population (2025-01-01)
  - Total: 22
  - Density: 7.3/km^{2} (19/sq mi)
- Time zone: UTC+1 (CET)
  - Summer (DST): UTC+2 (CEST)
- Postal code: 09593
- Website: www.cantabrana.es

Cantabrana is a municipality located in the province of Burgos, Castile and León, Spain. According to the 2004 census (INE), the municipality has a population of 39 inhabitants.
