= Villazopeque =

Coordinates: 42°12′N 4°01′W

- municipality
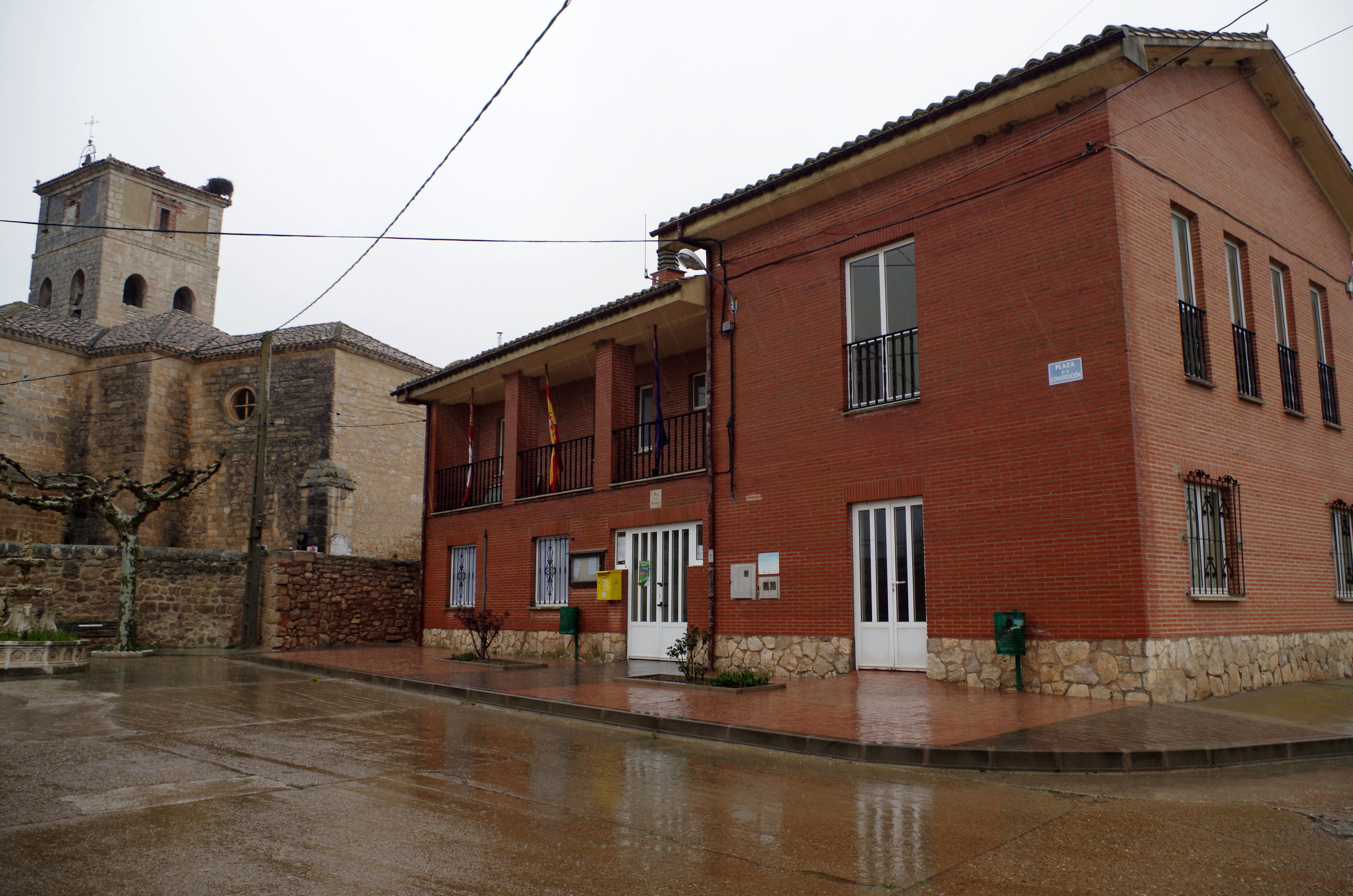
- Villazopeque Town Hall
- Interactive map of Villazopeque
- Country: Spain
- Autonomous community: Castile and León
- Province: Burgos

Area
  - Total: 11 km^{2} (4.2 sq mi)

Population (2025-01-01)
  - Total: 51
  - Density: 4.6/km^{2} (12/sq mi)
- Time zone: UTC+1 (CET)
  - Summer (DST): UTC+2 (CEST)

Villazopeque is a municipality located in the province of Burgos, Castile and León, Spain. According to the 2004 census (INE), the municipality had a population of 78 inhabitants.
