= Villaespasa =

Coordinates: 42°06′N 3°24′W

- municipality
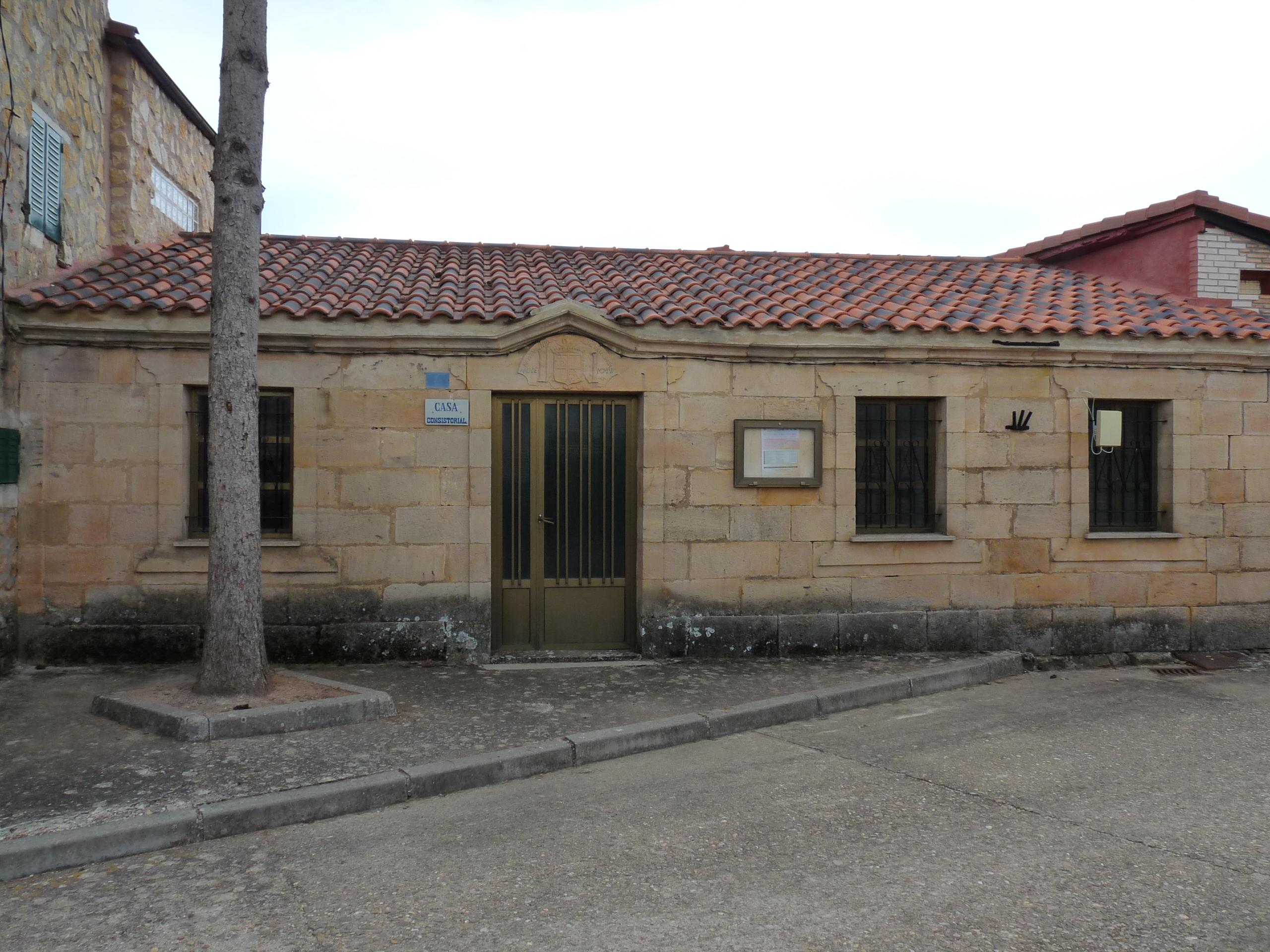
- Town hall
- Interactive map of Villaespasa
- Country: Spain
- Autonomous community: Castile and León
- Province: Burgos

Area
  - Total: 19.494 km^{2} (7.527 sq mi)

Population (2025-01-01)
  - Total: 21
  - Density: 1.1/km^{2} (2.8/sq mi)
- Time zone: UTC+1 (CET)
  - Summer (DST): UTC+2 (CEST)

Villaespasa is a municipality in the province of Burgos, Castile and León, Spain. According to the 2004 census (INE), the municipality had a population of 23 inhabitants.
