= Villaquirán de la Puebla =

Coordinates: 42°17′N 4°06′W

Villaquirán de la Puebla, Spain
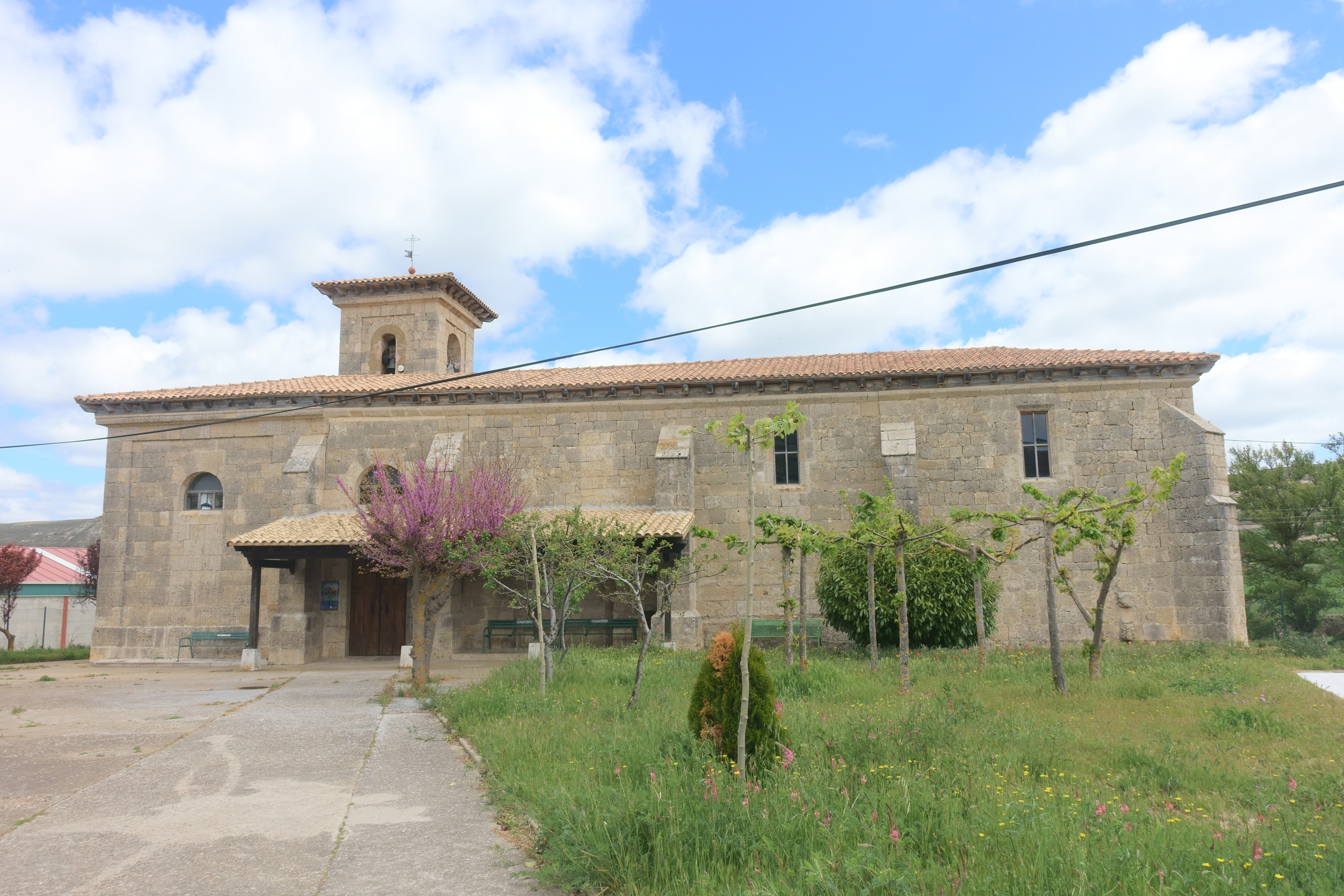
- Church of San Miguel in Villaquirán de la Puebla, Burgos, Spain
- Interactive map of Villaquirán de la Puebla, Spain
- Country: Spain
- Autonomous community: Castile and León
- Province: Burgos
- Municipality: Villaquirán de la Puebla

Area
  - Total: 11.48 km^{2} (4.43 sq mi)

Population (2025-01-01)
  - Total: 45
  - Density: 3.9/km^{2} (10/sq mi)
- Time zone: UTC+1 (CET)
  - Summer (DST): UTC+2 (CEST)

Villaquirán de la Puebla is a municipality located in the province of Burgos, Castile and León, Spain. According to the 2004 census (INE), the municipality has a population of 57 inhabitants.
