= Baños de Valdearados =

Coordinates: 41°46′N 3°33′W

- Municipality and town
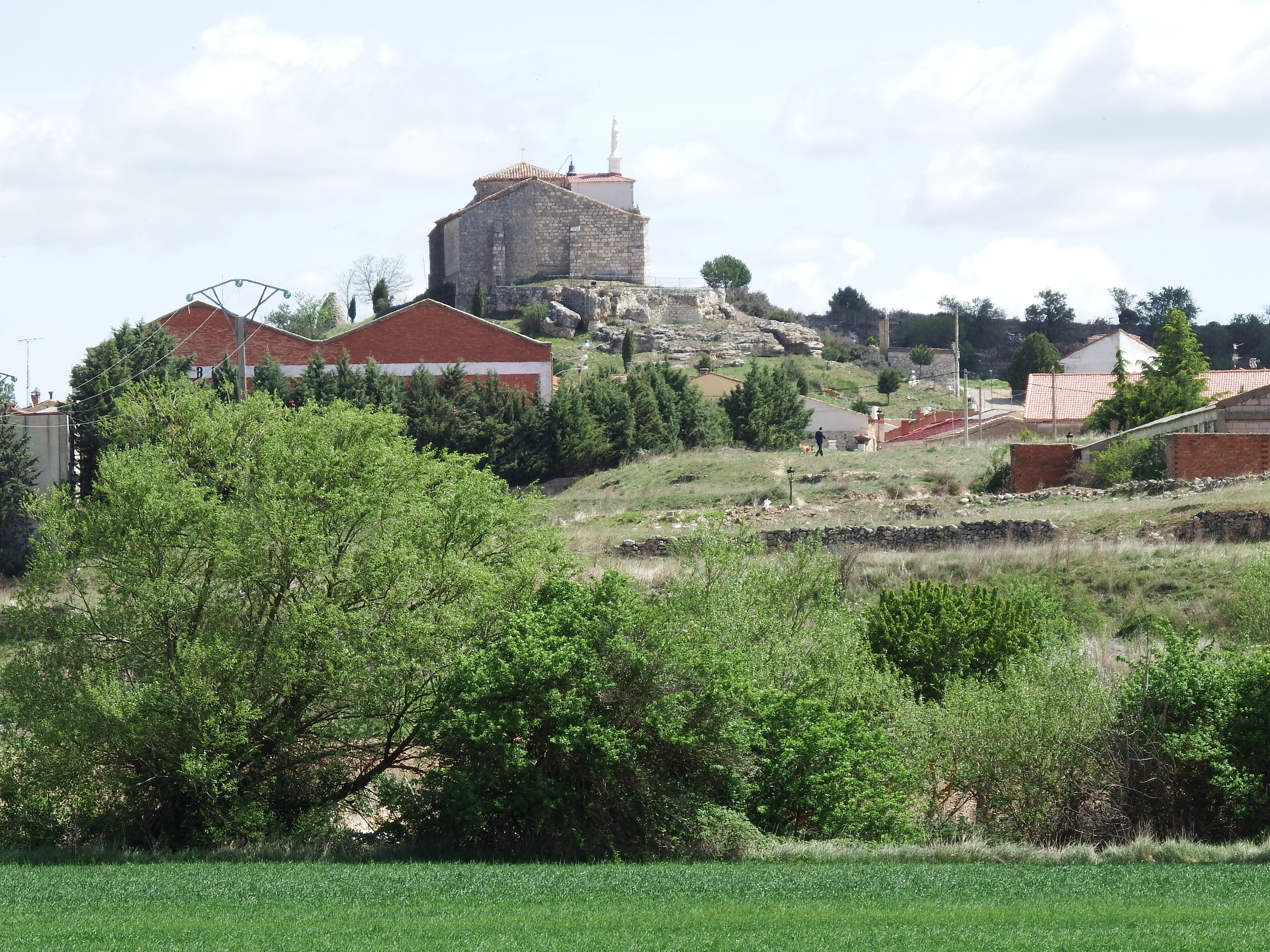
- Partial view of Baños de Valdearados

- Flag Coat of arms
- Interactive map of Baños de Valdearados
- Country: Spain
- Autonomous community: Castile and León
- Province: Burgos
- Comarca: Ribera del Duero

Area
  - Total: 37 km^{2} (14 sq mi)
- Elevation: 890 m (2,920 ft)

Population (2025-01-01)
  - Total: 322
  - Density: 8.7/km^{2} (23/sq mi)
- Time zone: UTC+1 (CET)
  - Summer (DST): UTC+2 (CEST)
- Postal code: 09450
- Website: Banos de Valdearados official website

Baños de Valdearados is a municipality and town located in the province of Burgos, Castile and León, Spain. According to the 2004 census (INE), the municipality has a population of 424 inhabitants.

== The town ==
The municipality located 16 km from Aranda de Duero and 80 km from Burgos is made up of a single population center. It has 407 inhabitants (INE 2008).

The town of Baños is 895 meters above sea level. The entire municipal area is surrounded by soft cornices that lead to moors 30 to 40 meters above the population. The highest points of the municipality range between 890 in Redondal and 925 in Rincón and Lo Tieso. The municipality waters the Bañuelos River, a tributary of the Duero.

Baños limits to the south with the municipalities of Quemada, Villanueva de Gumiel and Aranda de Duero; to the west with Tubilla del Lago and Gumiel de Izán; to the north with Valdeande and Caleruega; and to the east with Hontoria de Valdearados.

The active population of the municipality is dedicated above all to work in Aranda de Duero and to the cultivation of the vineyard and cereals.

The name of "Baños" seems to refer to the existence of "hot springs" in the town. Thus, in the Roman Villa hot springs have been discovered whose water came from the so-called "Source of Health". However, other authors invite us to think that the place name derives from the Latin word "Vannos" which means wasteland.

== History ==
Hermitage of Santa María Magdalena In the Census of Neighborhoods of the Crown of Castilla carried out in 15912 it was called Vaños, it belonged to the Partido de los Arauces, included in the province of Burgos. The party had 876 neighboring bosses.

Villa, then known as Arauzo de Valdearados and belonging to the Jurisdiction of Los Arauzos, of realengo, in the party of Aranda de Duero, with Ordinary Mayor.

In 1843 it belonged to the Aranda party and had 364 inhabitants.

== Artistic heritage ==
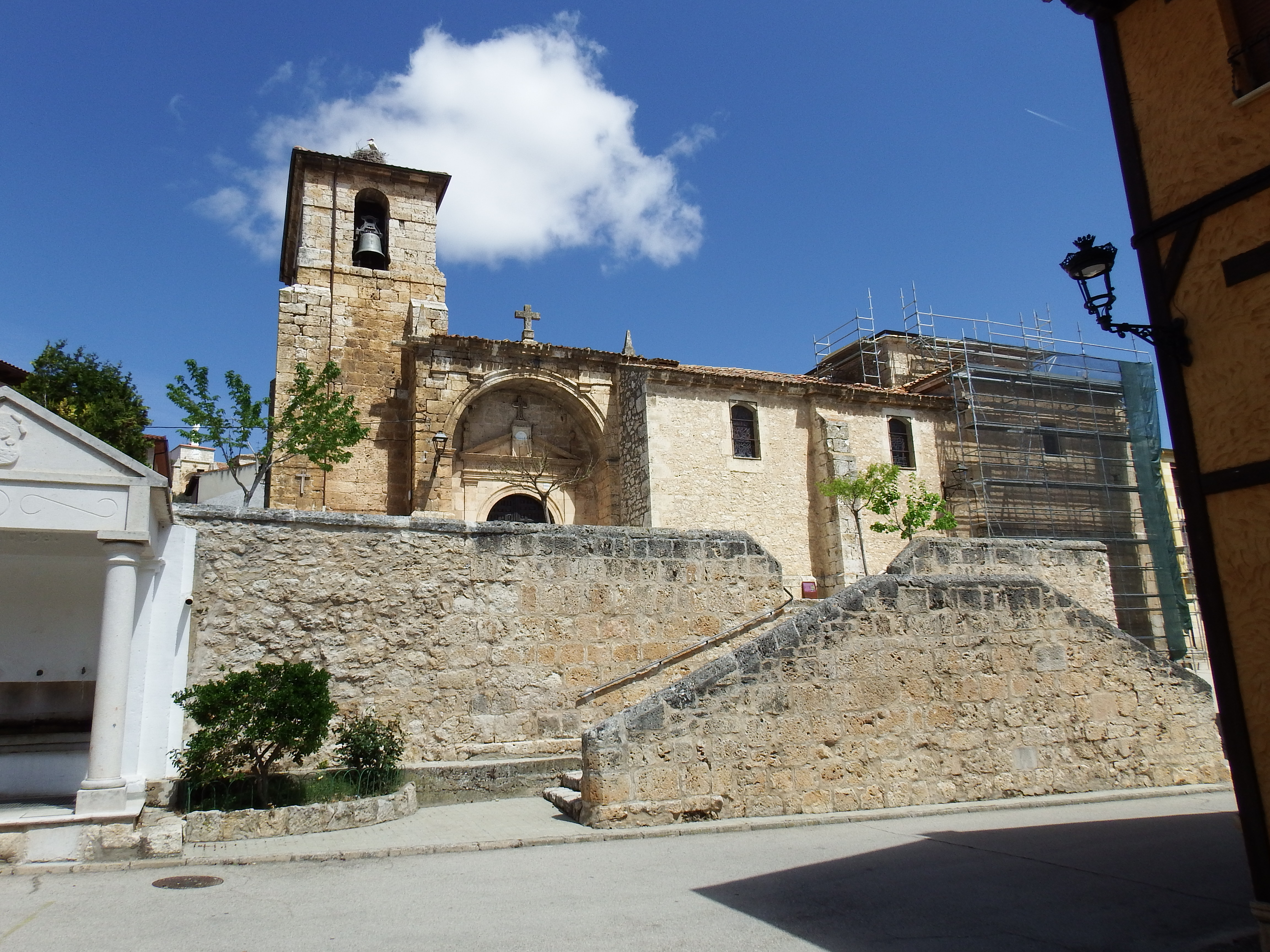
The Church of the Assumption in Baños de Valdearados

Its entire municipal area is full of traces of history, but without a doubt this has left a clear trail in the Roman Villa of Santa Cruz, with mosaics of special value, discovered by chance in the month of November 1972, about 300 m south before entering the town coming from the Aranda road.

Other monuments include the Parish Church of Nuestra Señora de la Asunción, in a neoclassical style with a cover of Renaissance influences, from the 17th century, the Hermitage of Santo Cristo del Consuelo, with an Elizabethan Gothic façade, the Hermitage of San Roque from the 17th century and the Hermitage of Santa María Magdalena from the 16th century.

== Fiestas ==
- Santa Águeda, on February 5, where women were formerly taken out by men to dance in the moonlight.
- Marzas (Last day of February at 12 midnight).
- Pilgrimage in honor of Santa María Magdalena (Saturday before Ascension Thursday).
- Patron saint festivities in honor of the Virgin of the Assumption and San Roque (August 15 and 16).
- Roman Festival in honor of the God Bacchus (weekend following the patron saint festivities in August).
- Feast of the Exaltation of the Holy Cross (September 14).
- Los Quintos (December 31, although they also occur in summer).

== Notable people ==
- Zacarías Martínez Núñez (Baños de Valdearados, Burgos, 1864 - Santiago de Compostela, 1933), illustrious Augustinian friar and biologist, and bishop in several Spanish dioceses. He became an Augustinian in 1881. He received a doctorate in natural-physical sciences and was a student of Santiago Ramón y Cajal, who, in 1907, prefaced his work Biological Studies. Professor at the Augustinian school of San Lorenzo de El Escorial and in other centers of his order. In 1919 he was consecrated Bishop of Huesca and in 1923 of Vitoria. In 1927 he was finally promoted to archbishop of Santiago de Compostela, where he died. He has streets in his honor in Huesca, Sariñena, Vitoria and Baños de Valdearados.
- Deogracias Palacios del Río, (Baños de Valdearados, Burgos 1901 - Motril, Granada 1936) Augustinian Recollect priest, beatified in March 1999 by Pope John Paul II.
