= Berlangas de Roa =

Coordinates: 41°41′N 3°52′W

- Municipality and town
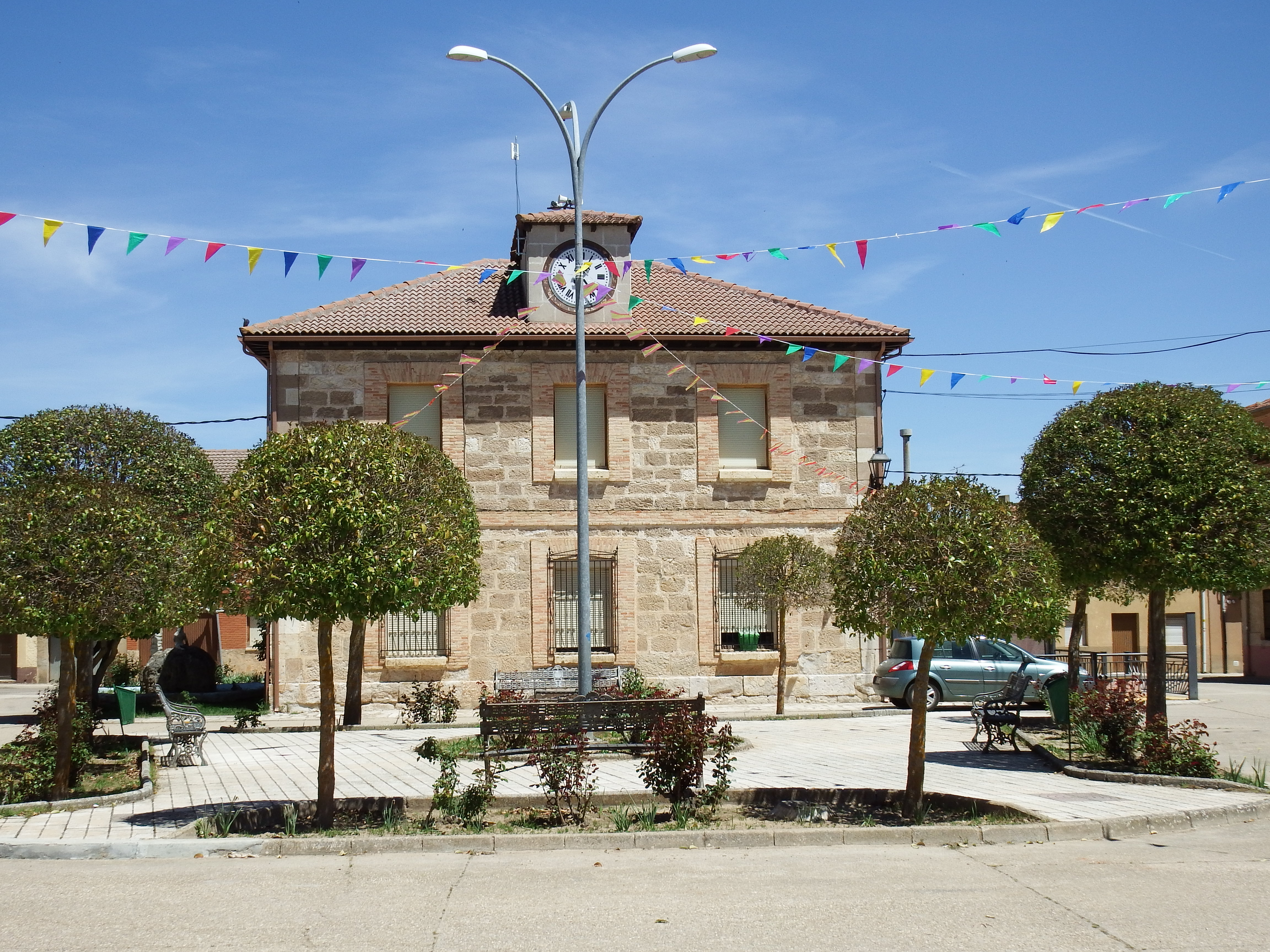

- Coat of arms
- Interactive map of Berlangas de Roa
- Country: Spain
- Autonomous community: Castile and León
- Province: Burgos
- Comarca: Ribera del Duero

Area
  - Total: 16 km^{2} (6.2 sq mi)
- Elevation: 780 m (2,560 ft)

Population (2025-01-01)
  - Total: 204
  - Density: 13/km^{2} (33/sq mi)
- Time zone: UTC+1 (CET)
  - Summer (DST): UTC+2 (CEST)
- Postal code: 09316
- Website: http://www.berlangasderoa.es/

Berlangas de Roa is a municipality and town located in the province of Burgos, Castile and León, Spain. According to the 2004 census (INE), the municipality has a population of 226 inhabitants.
