= Pedrosa de Duero =

- Municipality and town
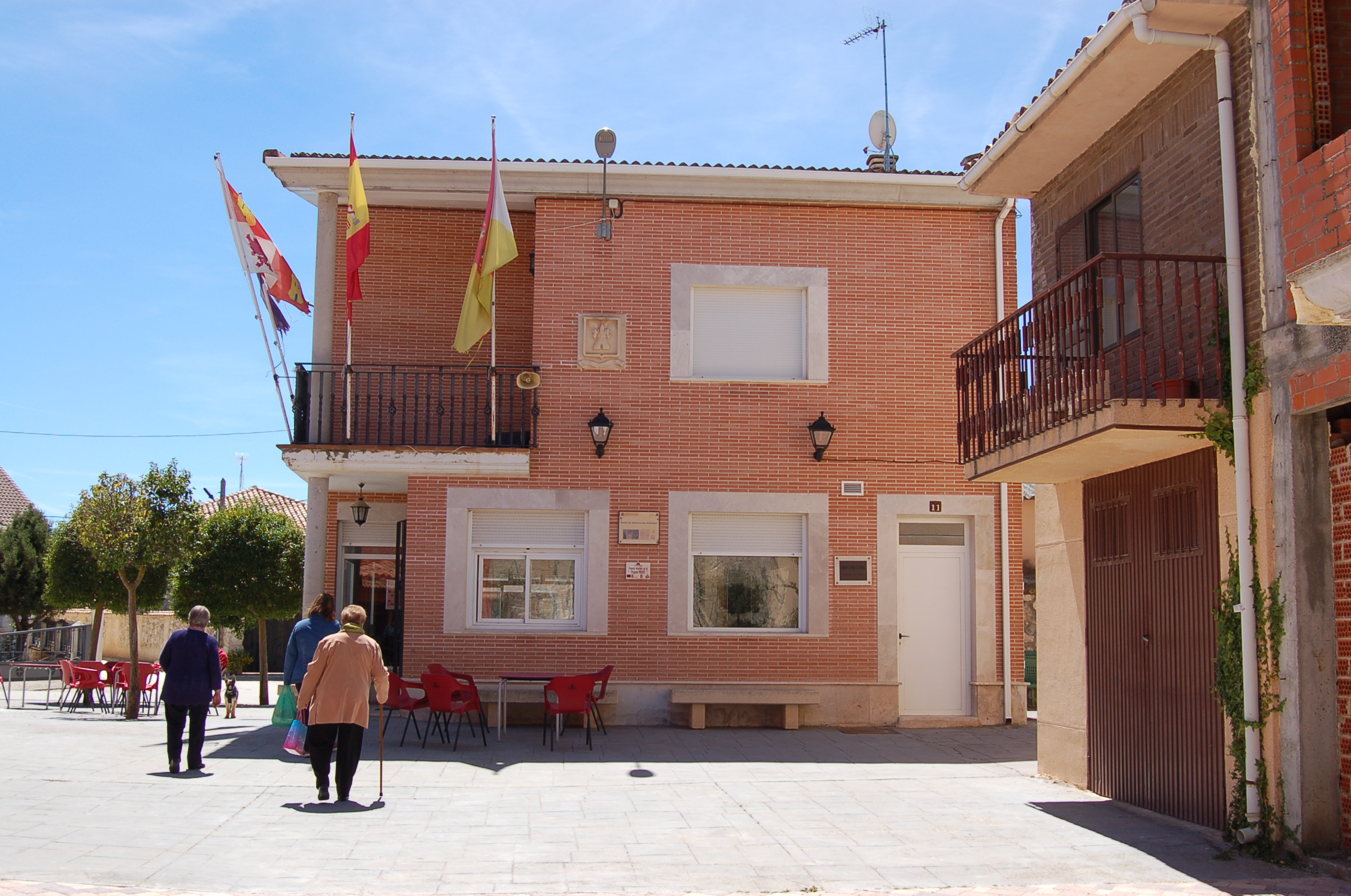
- Pedrosa de Duero Town Hall

- Location within Castile and León Location within Spain
- Coordinates: 41°43′N 3°59′W
- Country: Spain
- Autonomous community: Castile and León
- Province: Burgos
- Comarca: Ribera del Duero

Area
  - Total: 69 km^{2} (27 sq mi)
- Elevation: 844 m (2,769 ft)

Population (2025-01-01)
  - Total: 458
  - Density: 6.6/km^{2} (17/sq mi)
- Time zone: UTC+1 (CET)
  - Summer (DST): UTC+2 (CEST)
- Postal code: 09314
- Website: http://www.pedrosadeduero.es/

Pedrosa de Duero is a municipality and town located in the province of Burgos, Castile and León, Spain. According to the 2004 census (INE), the municipality has a population of 501.
