= Hontangas =

Coordinates: 41°35′N 3°47′W

- Municipality
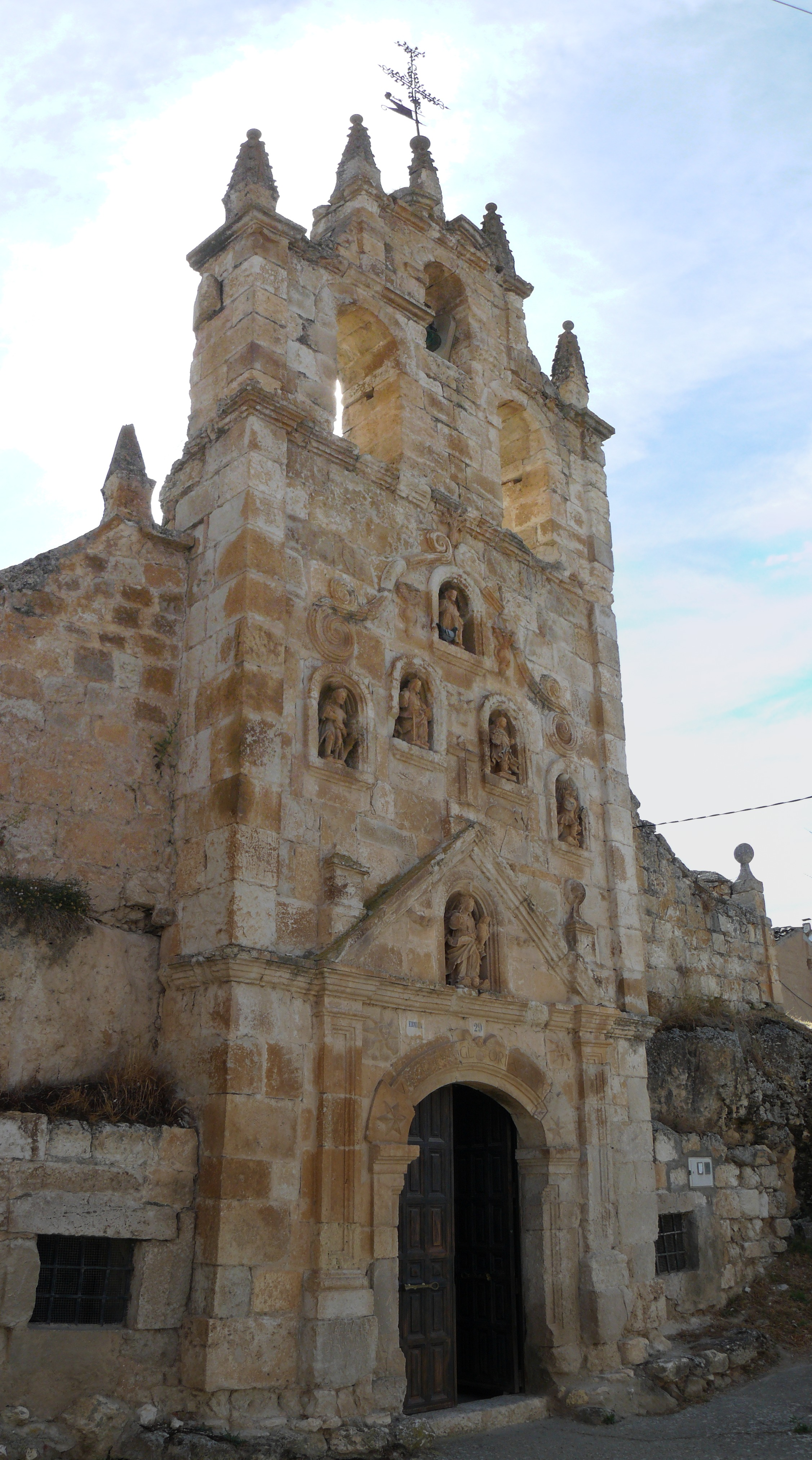
- Nuestra Señora de la Cueva shrine (17th century)

- Coat of arms
- Interactive map of Hontangas
- Country: Spain
- Autonomous community: Castile and León
- Province: Burgos
- Comarca: Ribera del Duero

Area
  - Total: 12 km^{2} (4.6 sq mi)
- Elevation: 840 m (2,760 ft)

Population (2025-01-01)
  - Total: 92
  - Density: 7.7/km^{2} (20/sq mi)
- Time zone: UTC+1 (CET)
  - Summer (DST): UTC+2 (CEST)
- Postal code: 09462
- Website: http://www.hontangas.es/

Hontangas is a municipality located in the province of Burgos, Castile and León, Spain. According to the 2004 census (INE), the municipality has a population of 134 inhabitants. In 2009, there is 123 inhabitants.
