= La Cueva de Roa =

Municipality in Castile and León, Spain

Coordinates: 41°40′N 3°56′W

- Municipality
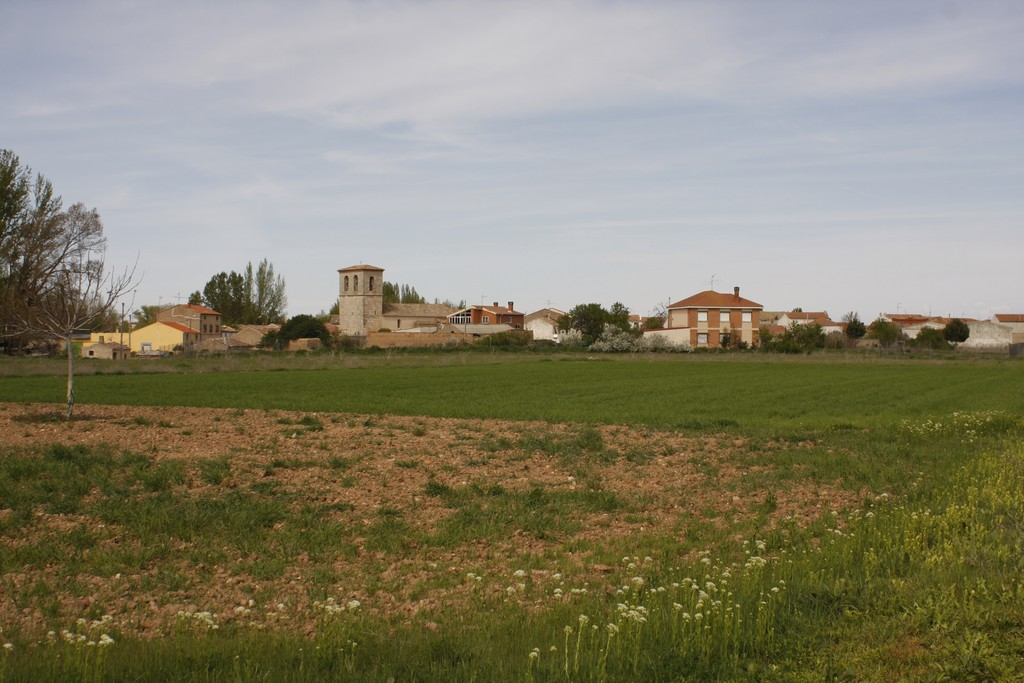
- View of La Cueva de Roa, 2010

- Coat of arms
- Interactive map of La Cueva de Roa
- Country: Spain
- Autonomous community: Castile and León
- Province: Burgos
- Comarca: Ribera del Duero

Area
  - Total: 12 km^{2} (4.6 sq mi)
- Elevation: 768 m (2,520 ft)

Population (2025-01-01)
  - Total: 82
  - Density: 6.8/km^{2} (18/sq mi)
- Time zone: UTC+1 (CET)
  - Summer (DST): UTC+2 (CEST)
- Postal code: 09315
- Website: http://www.lacuevaderoa.es/

La Cueva de Roa is a municipality located in the province of Burgos, Castile and León, Spain. According to the 2004 census (INE), the municipality has a population of 109 inhabitants.
