= Santa María del Mercadillo =

- Municipality and town
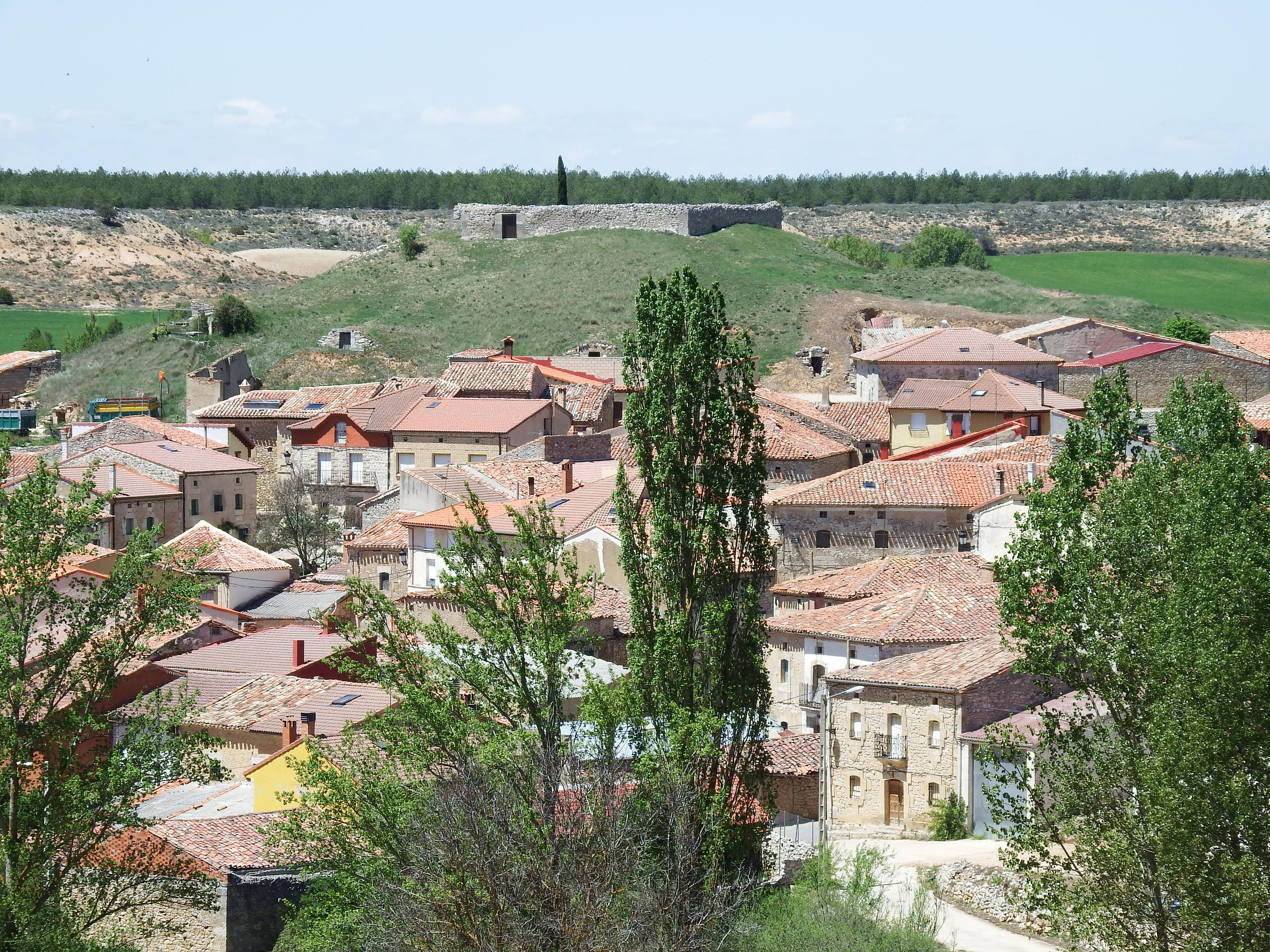
- General view

- Flag Coat of arms

- Location in Spain.
- Coordinates: 41.86°N 3.5589°W
- Country: Spain
- Autonomous community: Castile and León
- Province: Burgos
- Comarca: Ribera del Duero

Area
  - Total: 30.208 km^{2} (11.663 sq mi)
- Elevation: 961 m (3,153 ft)

Population (2025-01-01)
  - Total: 119
  - Density: 3.94/km^{2} (10.2/sq mi)
- Time zone: UTC+1 (CET)
  - Summer (DST): UTC+2 (CEST)
- Postal code: 09453
- Website: http://www.santamariadelmercadillo.es/

Santa María del Mercadillo is a municipality and town located in the province of Burgos, Castile and León, Spain. According to the 2004 census (INE), the municipality had a population of 167 inhabitants.
