= Santa Cruz de la Salceda =

Coordinates: 41°36′N 3°35′W

- Municipality and town
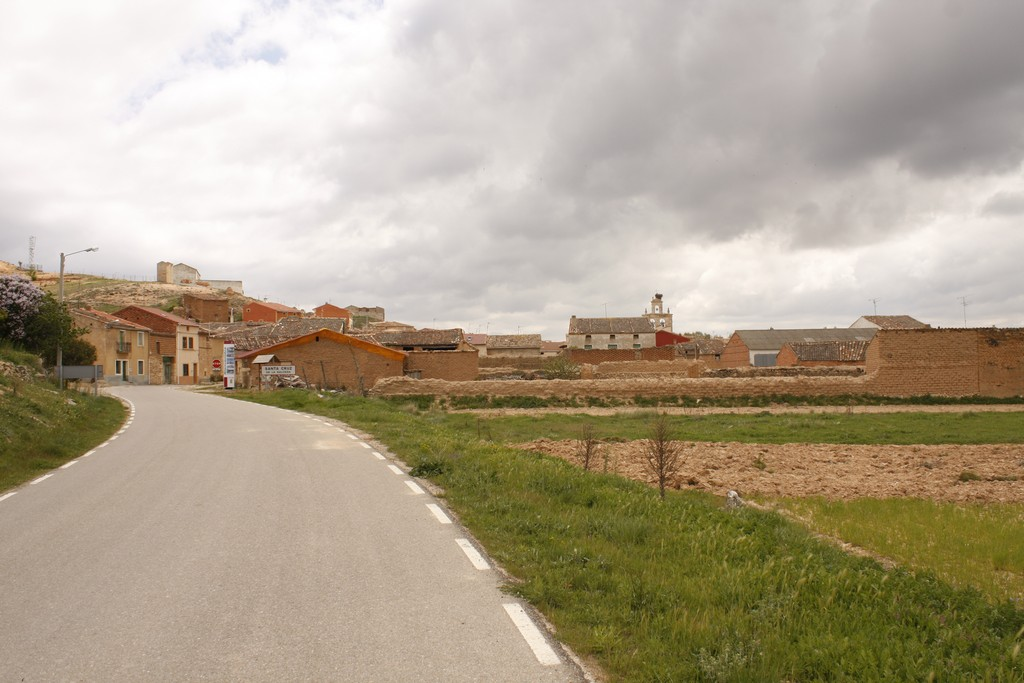
- View of Santa Cruz de la Salceda, 2010

- Flag Coat of arms
- Interactive map of Santa Cruz de la Salceda
- Country: Spain
- Autonomous community: Castile and León
- Province: Burgos
- Comarca: Ribera del Duero

Area
  - Total: 25.86 km^{2} (9.98 sq mi)
- Elevation: 881 m (2,890 ft)

Population (2025-01-01)
  - Total: 148
  - Density: 5.72/km^{2} (14.8/sq mi)
- Time zone: UTC+1 (CET)
  - Summer (DST): UTC+2 (CEST)
- Postal code: 09471
- Website: http://santacruzdelasalceda.burgos.es/

Santa Cruz de la Salceda is a municipality and town in the province of Burgos, Castile and León, Spain. According to the 2004 census (INE), the municipality had a population of 178 inhabitants.
