= La Sequera de Haza =

Coordinates: 41°34′N 3°49′W

- Municipality
- Coat of arms
- Interactive map of La Sequera de Haza
- Country: Spain
- Autonomous community: Castile and León
- Province: Burgos
- Comarca: Ribera del Duero

Area
  - Total: 6 km^{2} (2.3 sq mi)
- Elevation: 866 m (2,841 ft)

Population (2025-01-01)
  - Total: 28
  - Density: 4.7/km^{2} (12/sq mi)
- Time zone: UTC+1 (CET)
  - Summer (DST): UTC+2 (CEST)
- Postal code: 09462
- Website: http://www.lasequeradehaza.es/

La Sequera de Haza is a municipality located in the province of Burgos, Castile and León, Spain. According to the 2004 census (INE), the municipality has a population of 53 inhabitants.

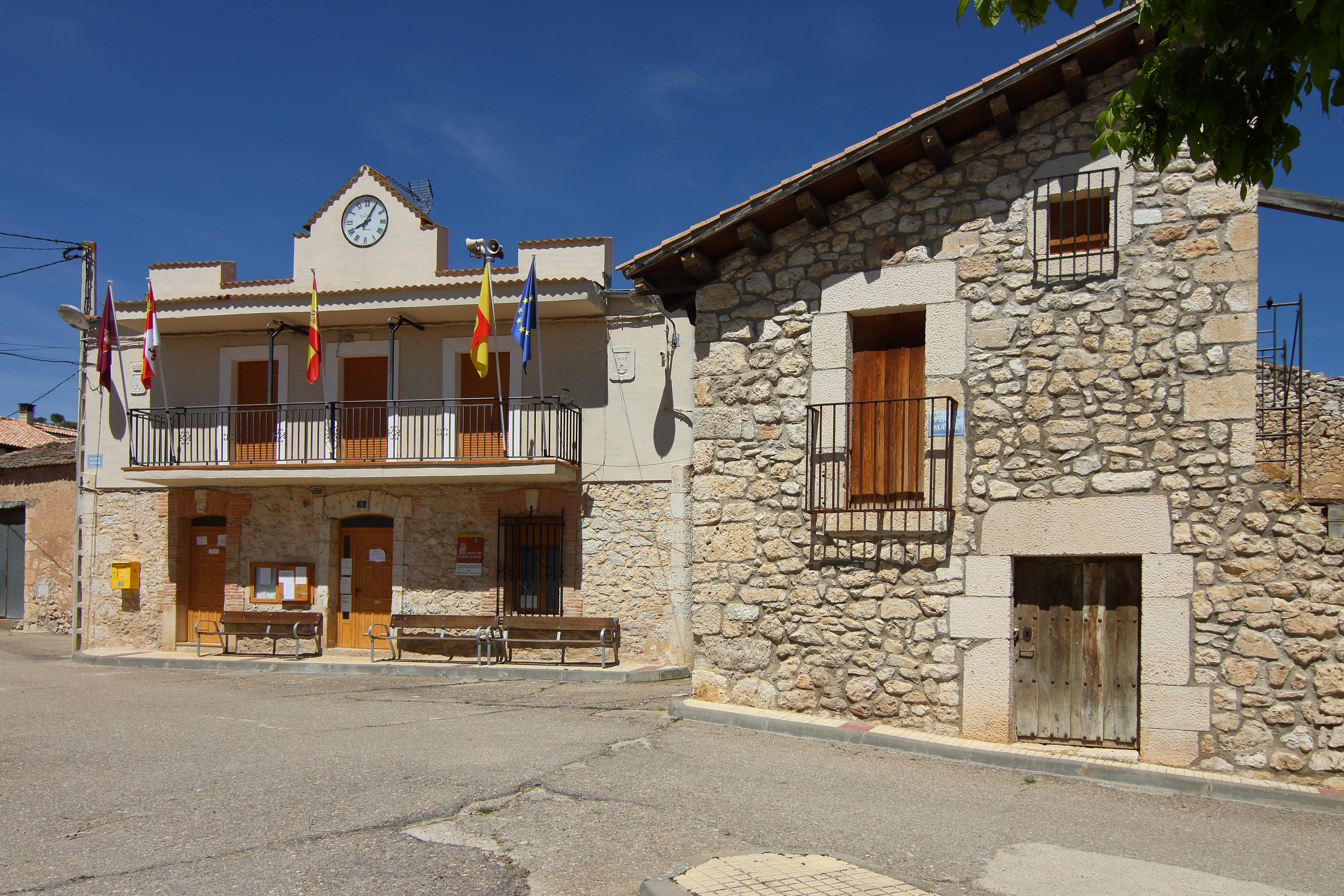
La Sequera de Haza Town Hall
