= Campillo de Aranda =

Coordinates: 41°37′N 3°44′W

- municipality
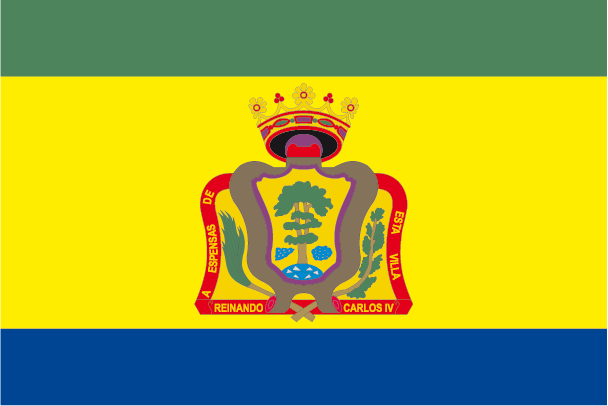
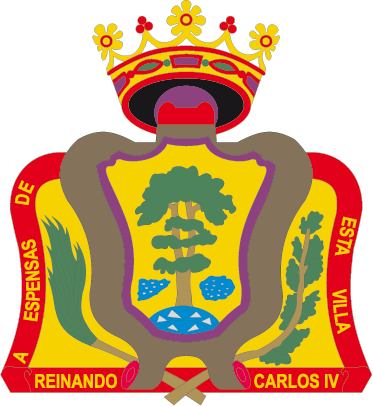
- Flag Coat of arms
- Interactive map of Campillo de Aranda
- Country: Spain
- Autonomous community: Castile and León
- Province: Burgos
- Comarca: Ribera del Duero

Area
  - Total: 24 km^{2} (9.3 sq mi)
- Elevation: 908 m (2,979 ft)

Population (2025-01-01)
  - Total: 175
  - Density: 7.3/km^{2} (19/sq mi)
- Time zone: UTC+1 (CET)
  - Summer (DST): UTC+2 (CEST)
- Postal code: 09493
- Website: http://www.campillodearanda.es/

Campillo de Aranda is a municipality located in the province of Burgos, Castile and León, Spain. According to the 2004 census (INE), the municipality has a population of 186 inhabitants.

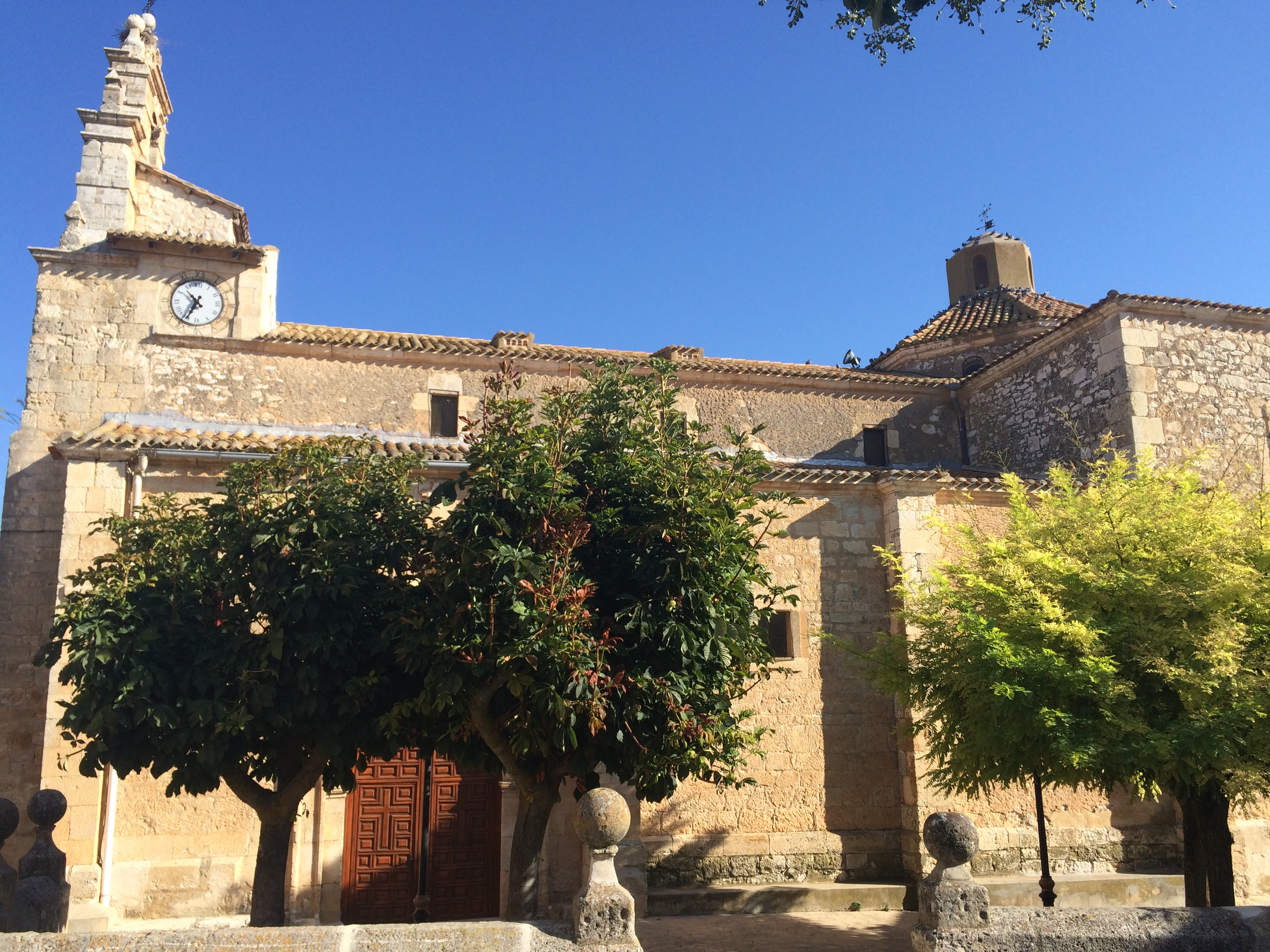
Parish Church of Campillo de Aranda
