= Sotillo de la Ribera =

Coordinates: 41°46′N 3°49′W

- Municipality and town
- Coat of arms
- Interactive map of Sotillo de la Ribera
- Country: Spain
- Autonomous community: Castile and León
- Province: Burgos
- Comarca: Ribera del Duero

Area
  - Total: 42 km^{2} (16 sq mi)
- Elevation: 898 m (2,946 ft)

Population (2025-01-01)
  - Total: 468
  - Density: 11/km^{2} (29/sq mi)
- Time zone: UTC+1 (CET)
  - Summer (DST): UTC+2 (CEST)
- Postal code: 09441
- Website: http://www.sotillodelaribera.es/

Sotillo de la Ribera is a municipality and town located in the province of Burgos, Castile and León, Spain. According to the 2004 census (INE), the municipality has a population of 603 inhabitants.

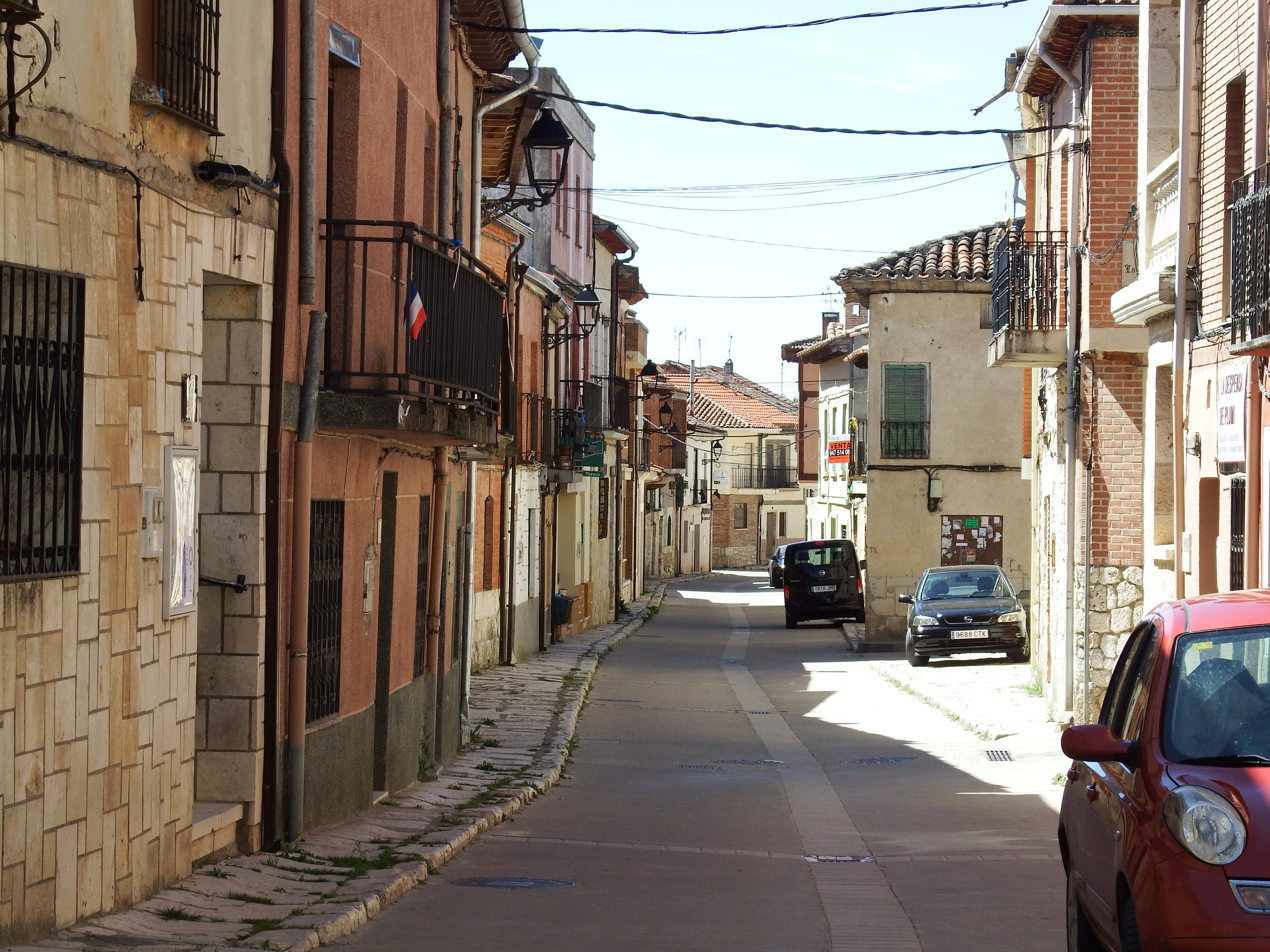
Street of Sotillo de la Ribera
