= Fuentecén =

Coordinates: 41°38′N 3°52′W

- Municipality and town
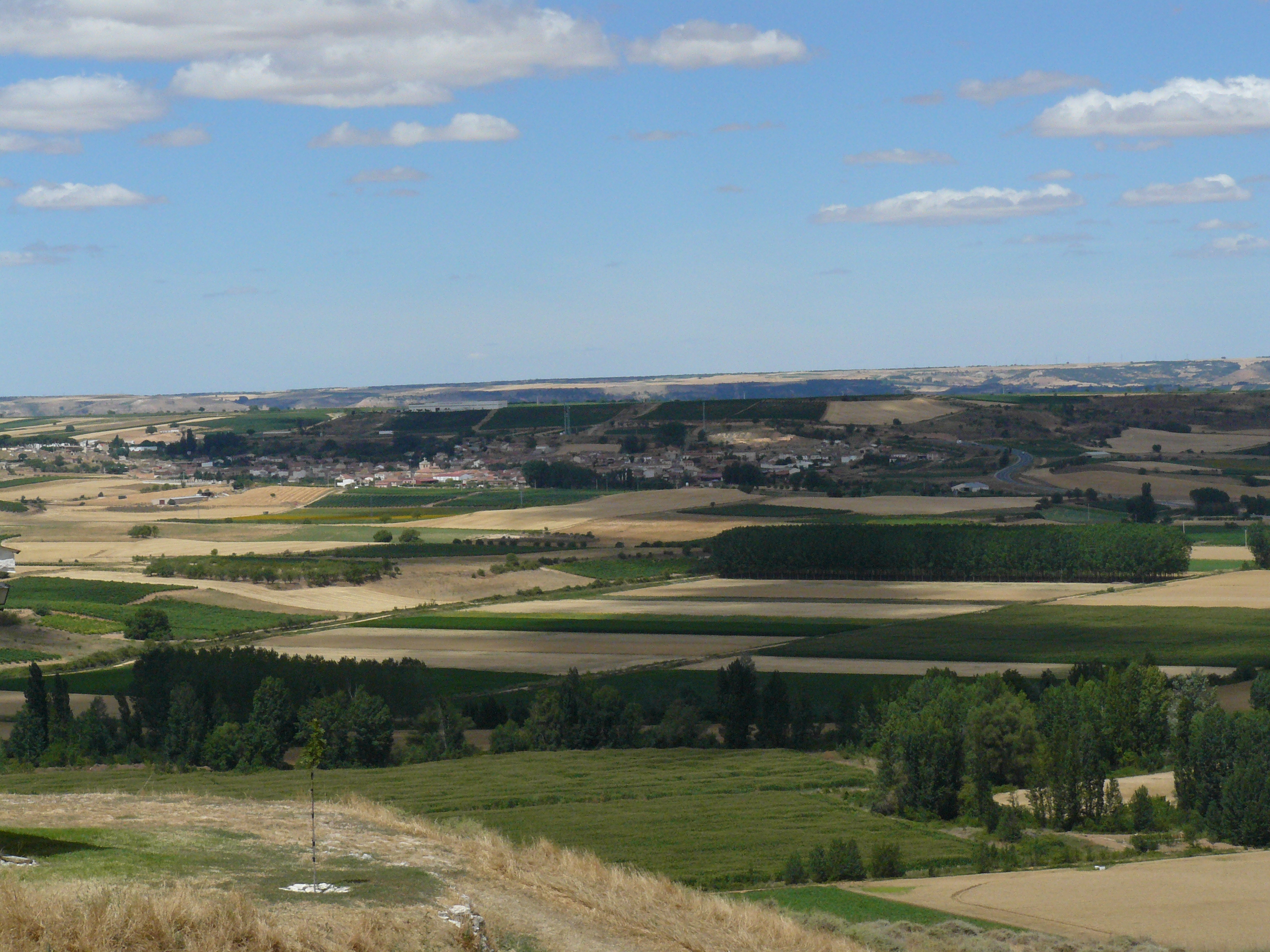
- View of Fuentecén, 2011

- Flag Coat of arms
- Interactive map of Fuentecén
- Country: Spain
- Autonomous community: Castile and León
- Province: Burgos
- Comarca: Ribera del Duero

Area
  - Total: 17 km^{2} (6.6 sq mi)
- Elevation: 820 m (2,690 ft)

Population (2025-01-01)
  - Total: 246
  - Density: 14/km^{2} (37/sq mi)
- Time zone: UTC+1 (CET)
  - Summer (DST): UTC+2 (CEST)
- Postal code: 09315
- Website: http://www.fuentecen.es/

Fuentecén is a municipality located in the province of Burgos, Castile and León, Spain. According to the 2004 census (INE), the municipality has a population of 285 inhabitants.
