= Anguix =

- Municipality and town
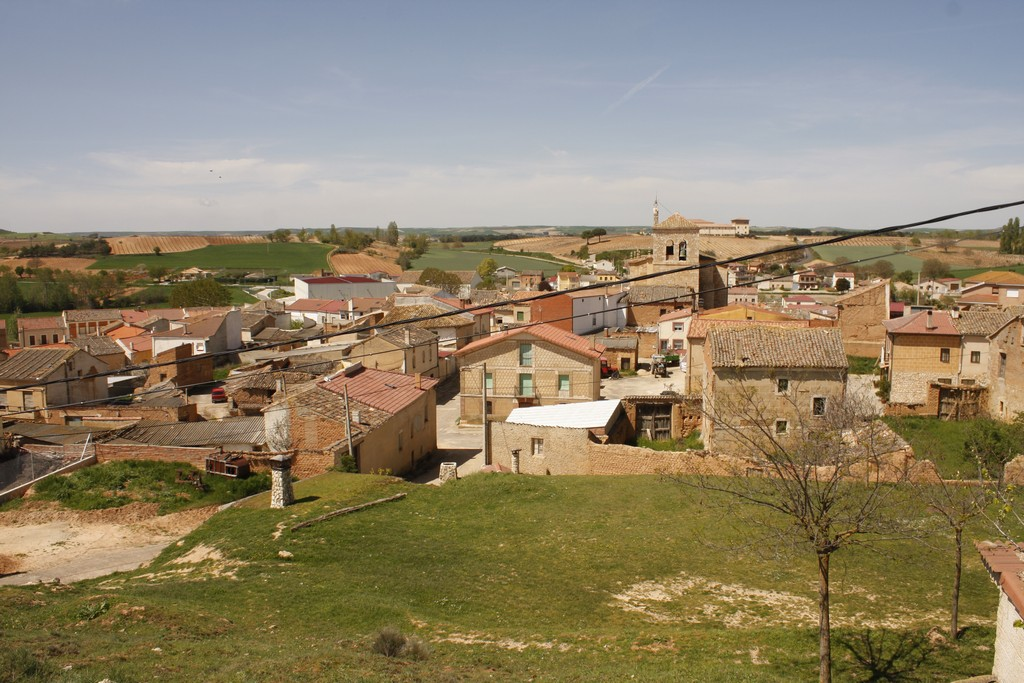
- View of Anguix, 2010

- Flag Coat of arms

- Location within Castile and León Location within Spain
- Coordinates: 41°45′N 3°55′W
- Country: Spain
- Autonomous community: Castile and León
- Province: Burgos
- Comarca: Ribera del Duero

Area
  - Total: 13.44 km^{2} (5.19 sq mi)
- Elevation: 820 m (2,690 ft)

Population (2019)
  - Total: 136
  - Density: 10.1/km^{2} (26.2/sq mi)
- Time zone: UTC+1 (CET)
  - Summer (DST): UTC+2 (CEST)
- Postal code: 09313
- Website: http://www.anguix.es/

Anguix is a municipality and town located in the province of Burgos, Castile and León, Spain. In 2019 the municipality had a population of 136 inhabitants.

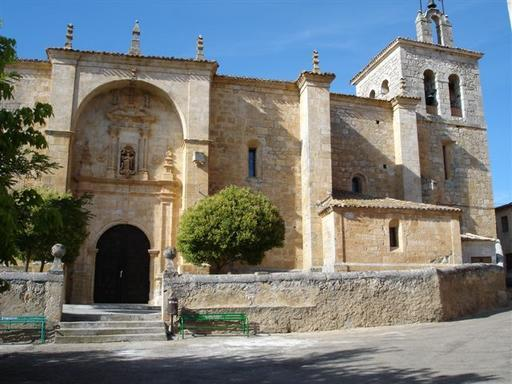
La Asunción de Nuestra Señora church (18th century)
