= Fuentelisendo =

Coordinates: 41°37′N 3°54′W

- Municipality
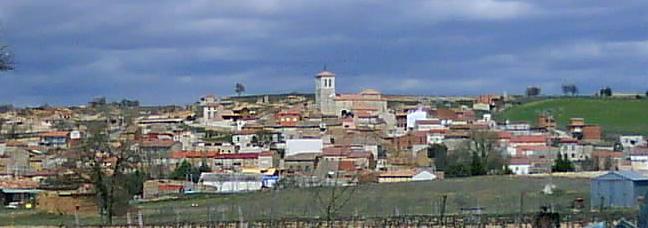
- View of Fuentelisendo, 2010

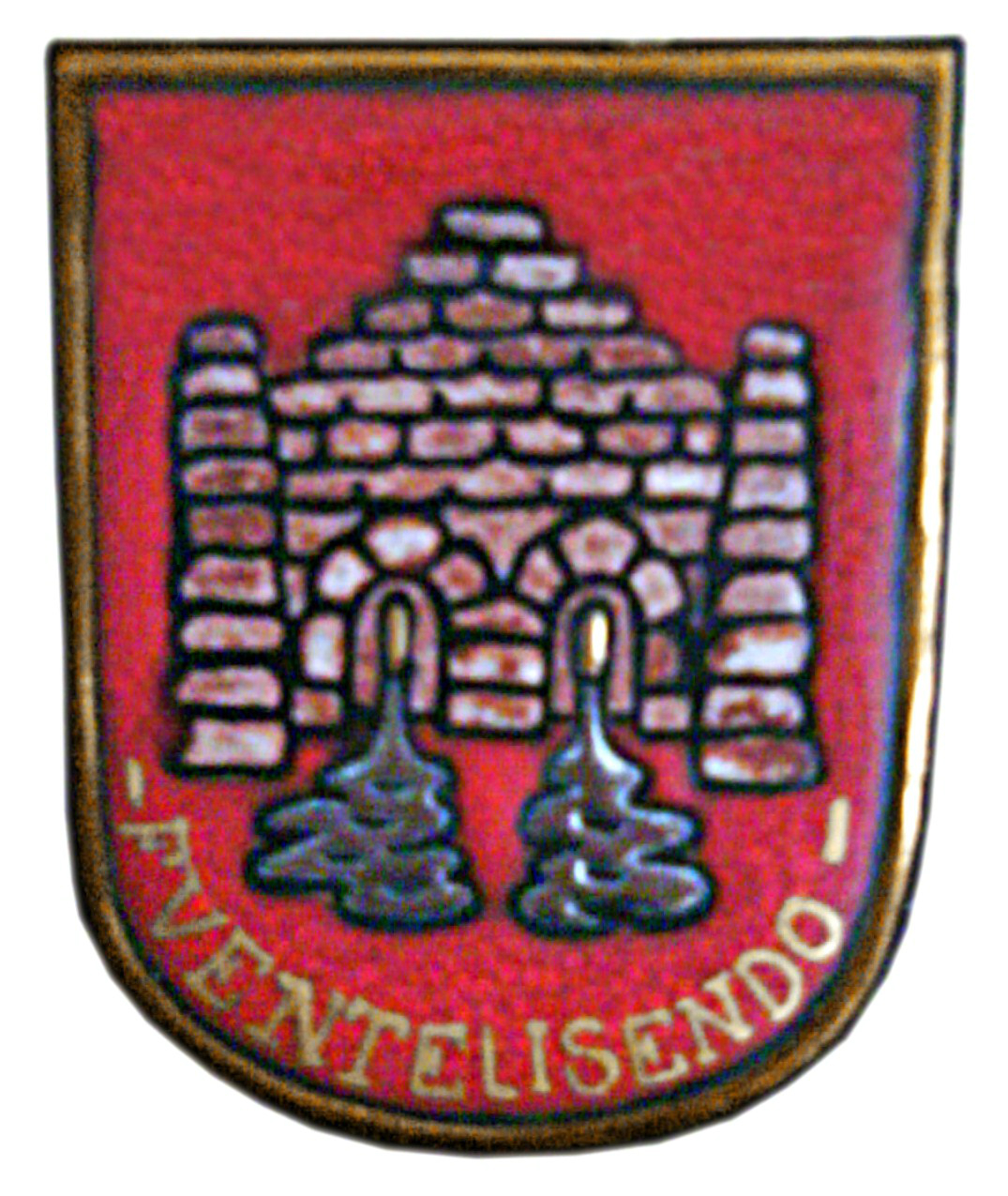
- Coat of arms
- Interactive map of Fuentelisendo
- Country: Spain
- Autonomous community: Castile and León
- Province: Burgos
- Comarca: Ribera del Duero

Area
  - Total: 7 km^{2} (2.7 sq mi)
- Elevation: 851 m (2,792 ft)

Population (2025-01-01)
  - Total: 96
  - Density: 14/km^{2} (36/sq mi)
- Time zone: UTC+1 (CET)
  - Summer (DST): UTC+2 (CEST)
- Postal code: 09318
- Website: http://www.fuentelisendo.es/

Fuentelisendo is a municipality located in the province of Burgos, Castile and León, Spain. According to the 2004 census (INE), the municipality has a population of 111 inhabitants.

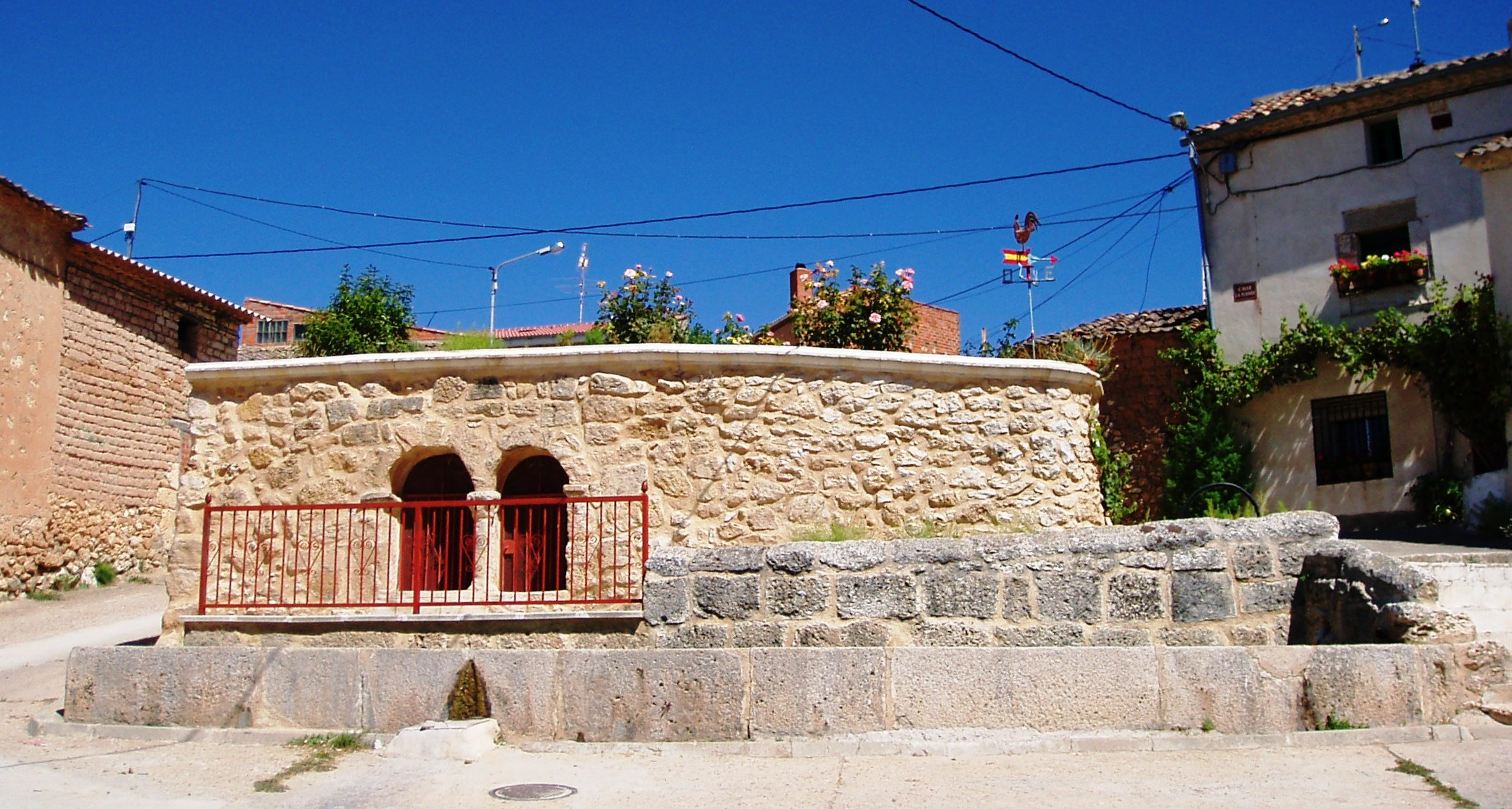
The fountain that give the town its name in 2006
