= Milagros, Province of Burgos =

Milagros
- Municipality and town
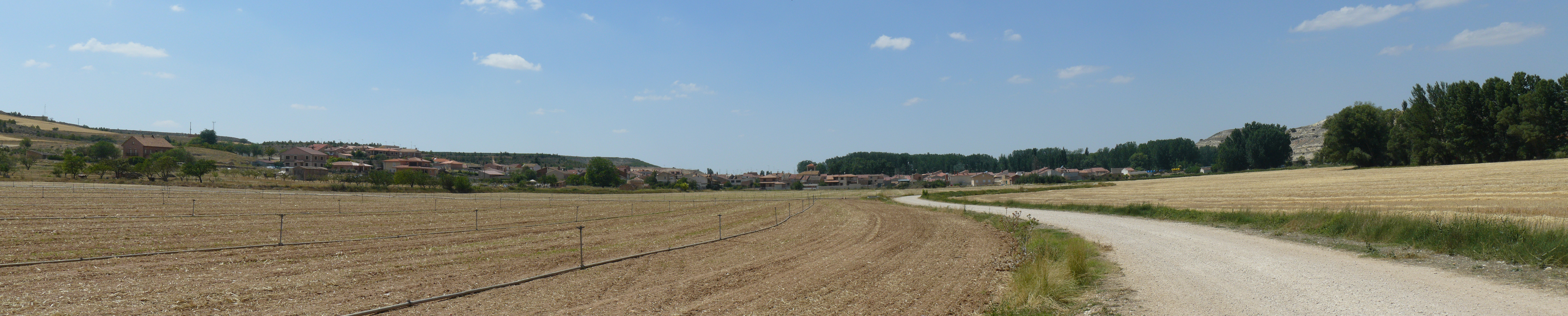
- Panoramic view of Milagros, 2012

- Flag Coat of arms
- Interactive map of Milagros
- Country: Spain
- Autonomous community: Castile and León
- Province: Burgos
- Comarca: Ribera del Duero

Government
  - Mayor: Jesús Melero García (PP)

Area
  - Total: 22 km^{2} (8.5 sq mi)
  - Land: 22 km^{2} (8.5 sq mi)
  - Water: 0.00 km^{2} (0 sq mi)
- Elevation: 848 m (2,782 ft)

Population (2025-01-01)
  - Total: 409
- Time zone: UTC+1 (CET)
  - Summer (DST): UTC+2 (CEST)
- Postal code: 09460
- Website: http://www.milagros.es/

Milagros is a Spanish village and municipality in the province of Burgos, part of the autonomous community of Castile and León. It has a population of approximately 502 people and is 10 km from Aranda de Duero. Milagros is in the comarca and wine region of the Ribera del Duero.

The name "Milagros" may be translated from Spanish by the English word, "miracles".

== Notable people ==
- José Vela Zanetti
