= Pineda Trasmonte =

- Municipality and town
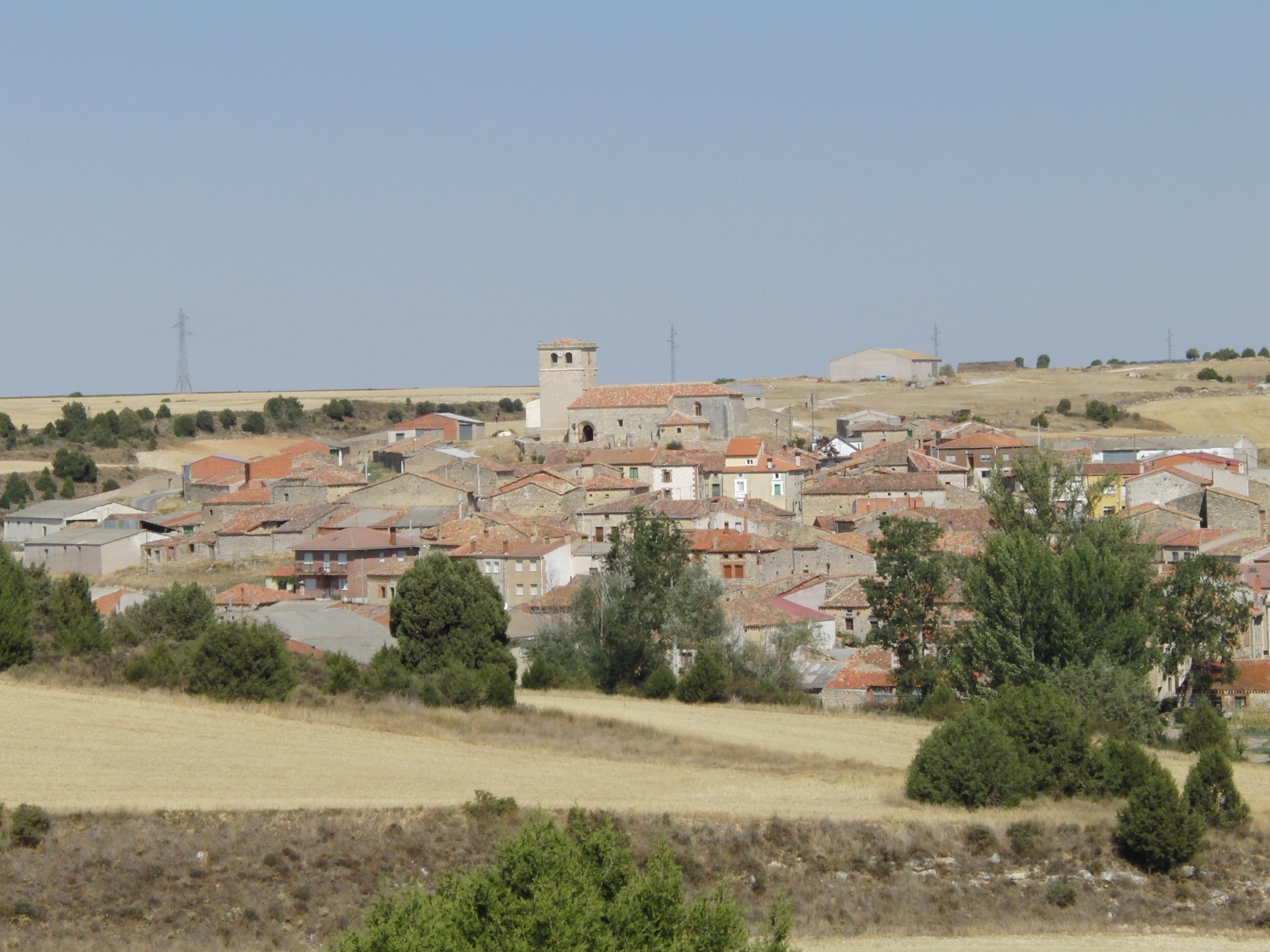
- View of Pineda Trasmonte, 2009

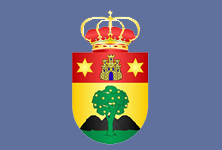
- Flag Coat of arms

- Location in Spain
- Coordinates: 41°54′34″N 3°41′46″W
- Country: Spain
- Autonomous community: Castile and León
- Province: Burgos
- Comarca: Ribera del Duero

Government
  - Alcalde: Basi Núñez Angulo (2010)

Area
  - Total: 28.17 km^{2} (10.88 sq mi)
- Elevation: 962 m (3,156 ft)

Population (2025-01-01)
  - Total: 95
  - Density: 3.4/km^{2} (8.7/sq mi)
- Demonym: Raposos
- Time zone: UTC+1 (CET)
  - Summer (DST): UTC+2 (CEST)
- Postal code: 09349
- Official language(s): Spanish
- Website: Official website

Pineda Trasmonte is a municipality and town located in the province of Burgos, Castile and León, Spain. According to the 2004 census (INE), the municipality has a population of 20 inhabitants.
