= Adrada de Haza =

- Municipality and town
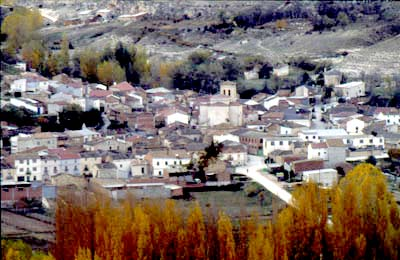
- View of Adrada de Haza

- Flag Coat of arms

- Location within Castile and León Location within Spain
- Coordinates: 41°36′N 3°49′W
- Country: Spain
- Autonomous community: Castile and León
- Province: Burgos
- Comarca: Ribera del Duero

Area
  - Total: 10.28 km^{2} (3.97 sq mi)
- Elevation: 822 m (2,697 ft)

Population (2025-01-01)
  - Total: 200
  - Density: 19/km^{2} (50/sq mi)
- Time zone: UTC+1 (CET)
  - Summer (DST): UTC+2 (CEST)
- Postal code: 09462
- Website: http://www.adradadehaza.es/

Adrada de Haza is a municipality and town located in the province of Burgos, Castile and León, Spain. According to the 2004 census (INE), the municipality had a population of 260 inhabitants.
