= Terradillos de Esgueva =

Coordinates: 41°49′N 3°50′W

- Municipality and town
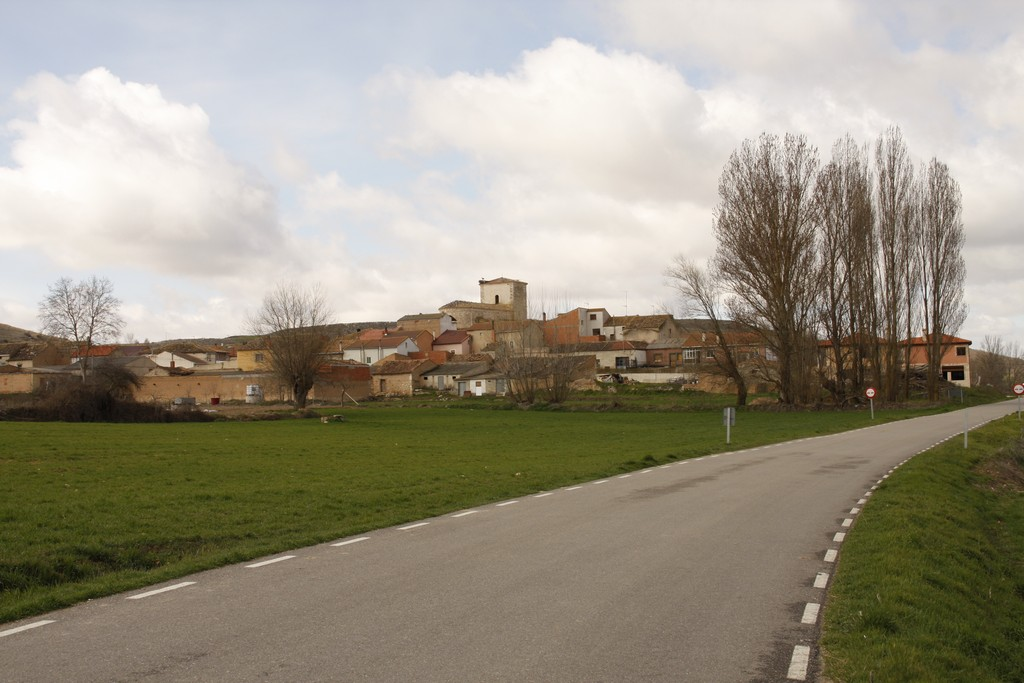
- View of Terradillos de Esgueva, 2010

- Coat of arms
- Interactive map of Terradillos de Esgueva
- Country: Spain
- Autonomous community: Castile and León
- Province: Burgos
- Comarca: Ribera del Duero

Area
  - Total: 14 km^{2} (5.4 sq mi)

Population (2025-01-01)
  - Total: 58
  - Density: 4.1/km^{2} (11/sq mi)
- Time zone: UTC+1 (CET)
  - Summer (DST): UTC+2 (CEST)
- Postal code: 09350
- Website: http://www.terradillosdeesgueva.es/

Terradillos de Esgueva is a municipality and town located in the province of Burgos, Castile and León, Spain. According to the 2022 census (INE), the municipality has a population of 69 inhabitants.
