= Castrillo de la Vega =

- Municipality and town
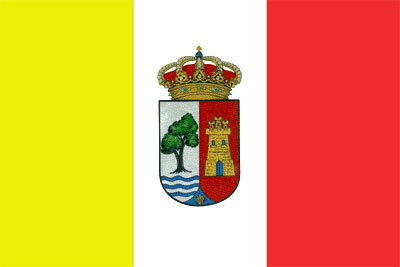
- Flag Coat of arms

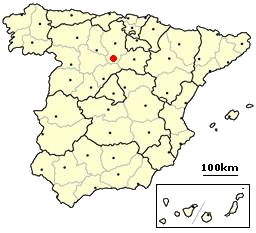
- Location of Castrillo de la Vega
- Country: Spain
- Autonomous community: Castile and León
- Province: Burgos
- Comarca: Ribera del Duero

Government
  - Mayor: Juan José Gutiérrez Rogero (PP)

Area
  - Total: 26 km^{2} (10 sq mi)

Population (2025-01-01)
  - Total: 626
  - Density: 24/km^{2} (62/sq mi)
- Time zone: UTC+1 (CET)
  - Summer (DST): UTC+2 (CEST)
- Postal code: 09391
- Website: https://web.archive.org/web/20070513160208/http://www.castrillodelavega.net/

Castrillo de la Vega is a Spanish town and municipality in the south of the province of Burgos, in the Ribera del Duero wine region. It has a population of roughly 657 people. The post code for the town is 09391. The closest airport is in Valladolid.

== Sources and external links ==
- Castrillo de la Vega
