= Oquillas =

Coordinates: 41°50′N 3°42′W

- Municipality
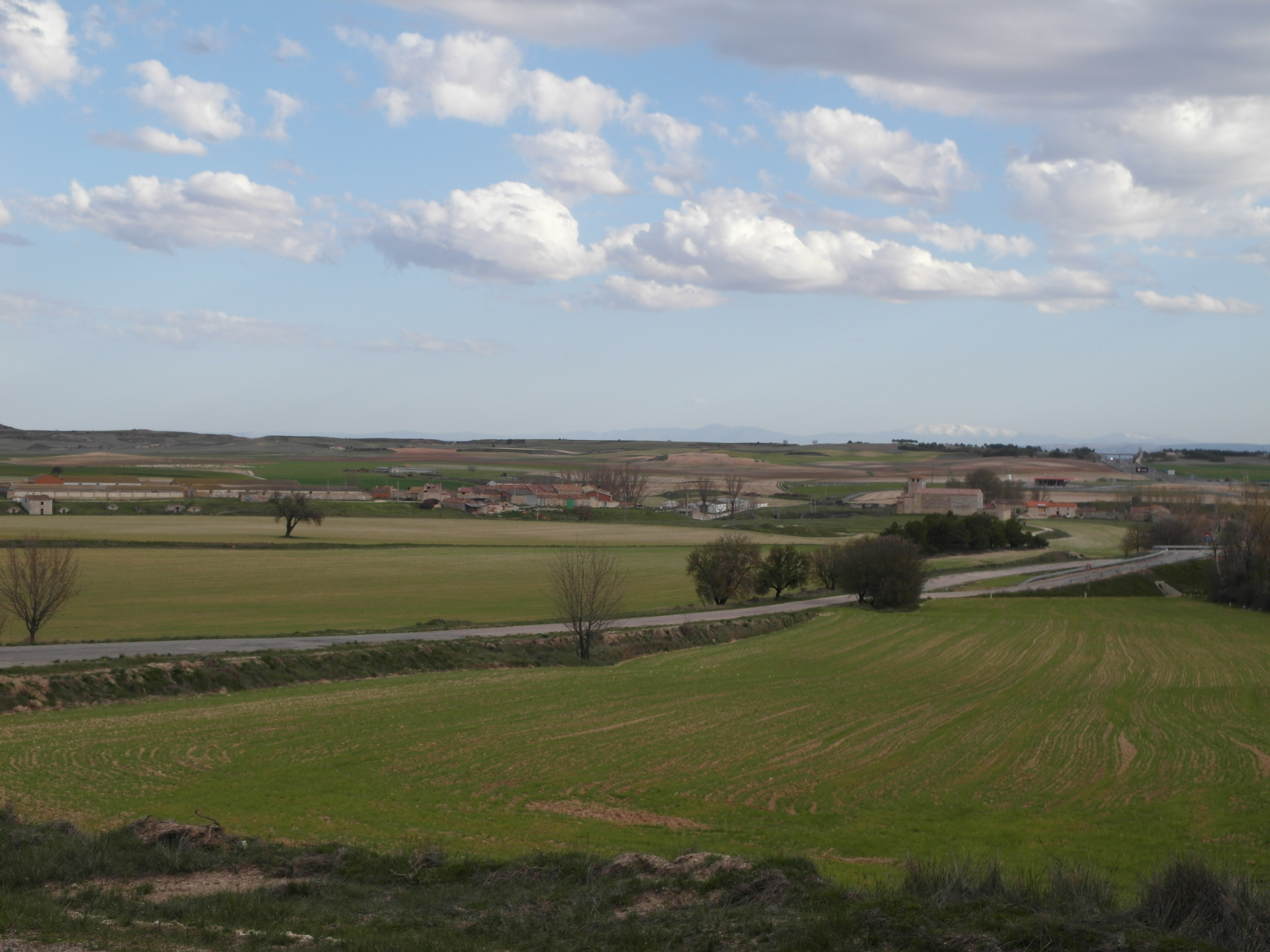
- View of Oquillas, 2010

- Flag Coat of arms
- Interactive map of Oquillas
- Country: Spain
- Autonomous community: Castile and León
- Province: Burgos
- Comarca: Ribera del Duero

Area
  - Total: 14 km^{2} (5.4 sq mi)
- Elevation: 914 m (2,999 ft)

Population (2025-01-01)
  - Total: 52
  - Density: 3.7/km^{2} (9.6/sq mi)
- Time zone: UTC+1 (CET)
  - Summer (DST): UTC+2 (CEST)
- Postal code: 09350
- Website: http://www.oquillas.es/

Oquillas is a municipality and town located in the province of Burgos, Castile and León, Spain. According to the 2022 census (INE), the municipality has a population of 51 inhabitants.
