= Mambrilla de Castrejón =

Coordinates: 41°40′N 3°59′W

- Municipality and town
- Flag Coat of arms
- Interactive map of Mambrilla de Castrejón
- Country: Spain
- Autonomous community: Castile and León
- Province: Burgos
- Comarca: Ribera del Duero

Area
  - Total: 16 km^{2} (6.2 sq mi)
- Elevation: 838 m (2,749 ft)

Population (2025-01-01)
  - Total: 105
  - Density: 6.6/km^{2} (17/sq mi)
- Time zone: UTC+1 (CET)
  - Summer (DST): UTC+2 (CEST)
- Postal code: 09317
- Website: http://www.mambrilladecastrejon.es/

Mambrilla de Castrejón is a municipality located in the province of Burgos, Castile and León, Spain. According to the 2004 census (INE), the municipality has a population of 138 inhabitants.

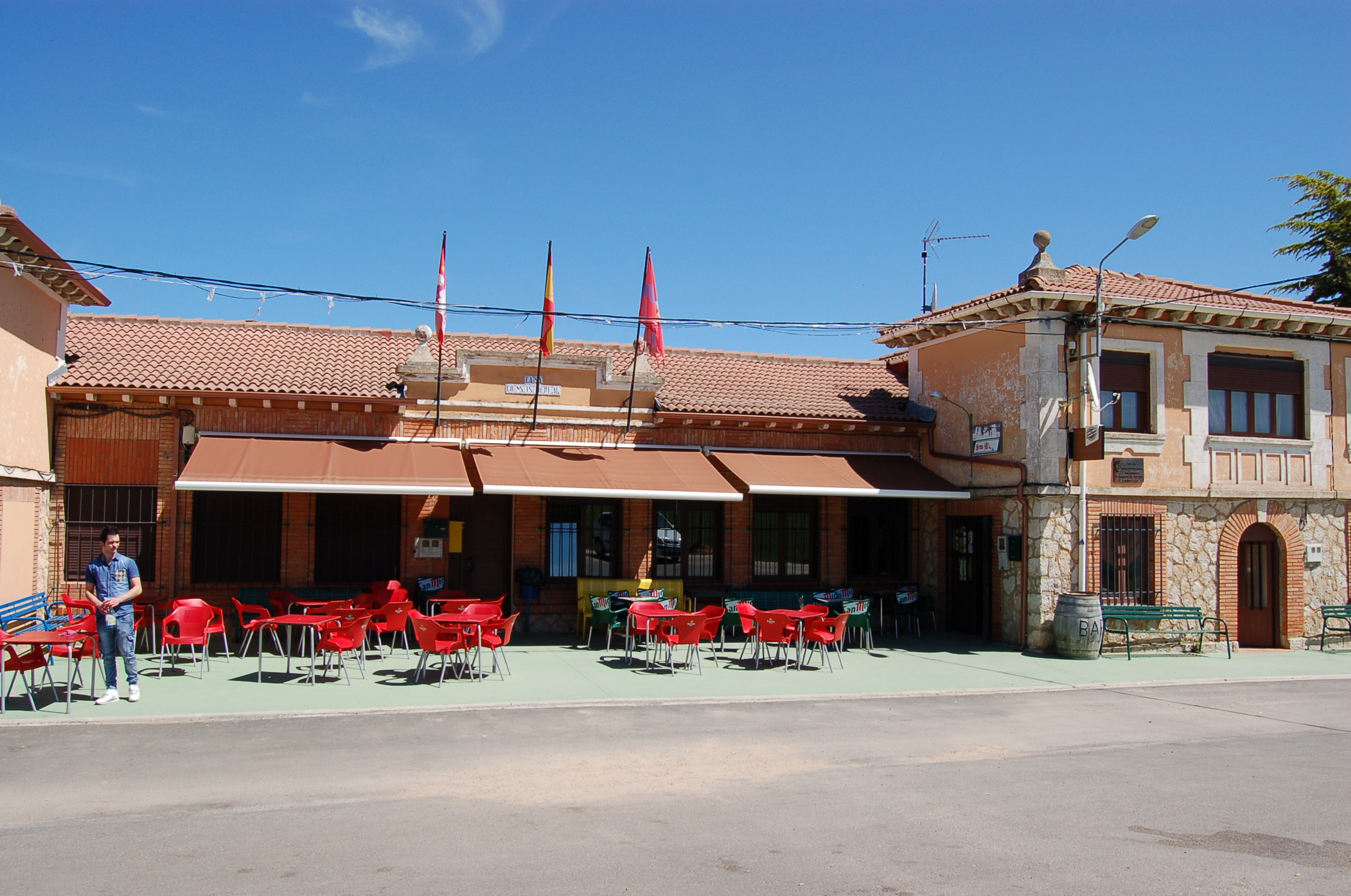
Tawn hall.
