= Hoyales de Roa =

Coordinates: 41°40′N 3°52′W

- Municipality
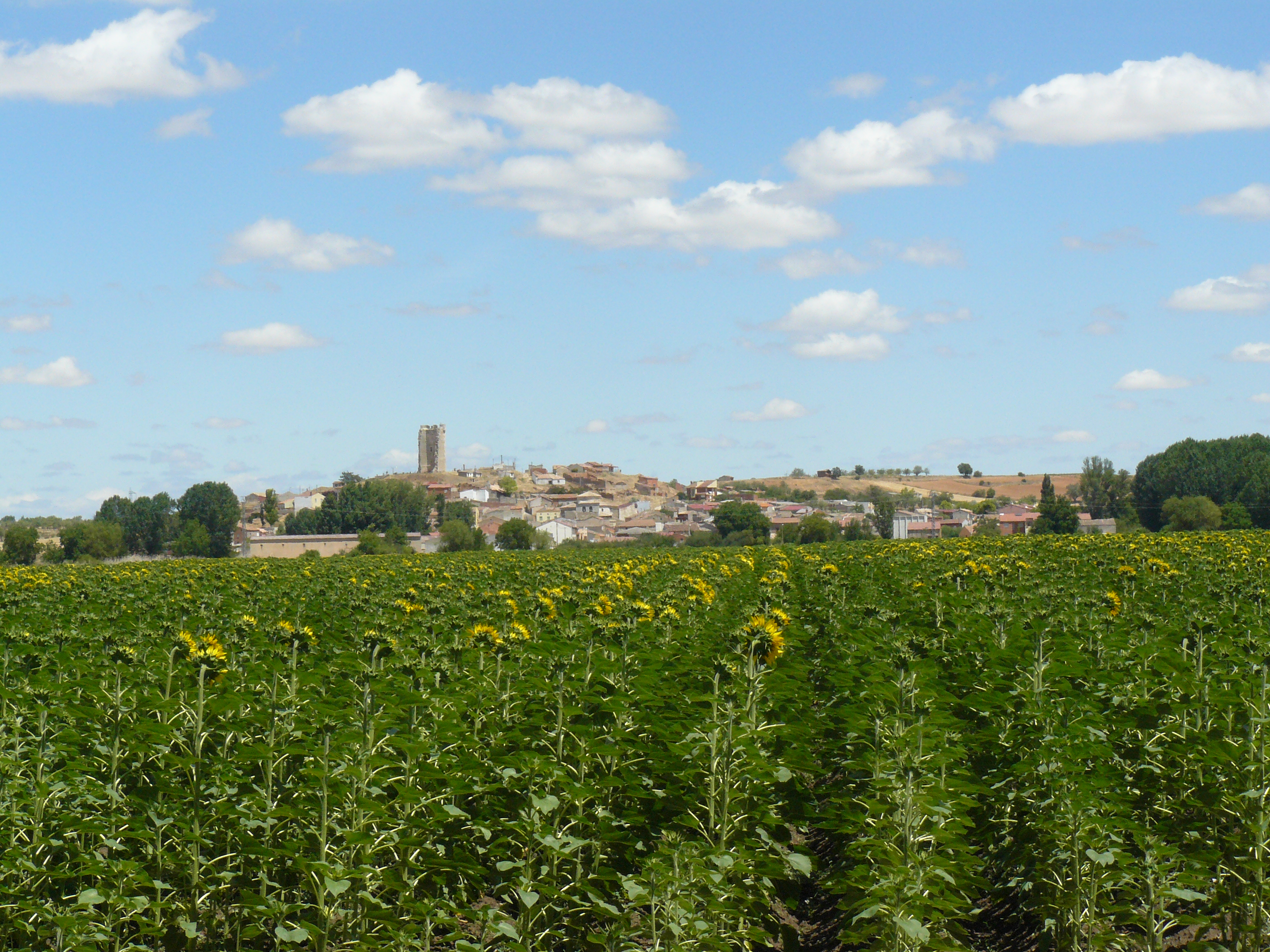
- View of Hoyales de Roa, 2011

- Flag Coat of arms
- Interactive map of Hoyales de Roa
- Country: Spain
- Autonomous community: Castile and León
- Province: Burgos
- Comarca: Ribera del Duero

Area
  - Total: 12.78 km^{2} (4.93 sq mi)
- Elevation: 794 m (2,605 ft)

Population (2025-01-01)
  - Total: 208
  - Density: 16.3/km^{2} (42.2/sq mi)
- Time zone: UTC+1 (CET)
  - Summer (DST): UTC+2 (CEST)
- Postal code: 09316
- Website: http://www.hoyalesderoa.es/

Hoyales de Roa is a municipality located in the province of Burgos, Castile and León, Spain. According to the 2004 census (INE), the municipality had a population of 269 inhabitants.
