= Olmedillo de Roa =

Coordinates: 41°47′N 3°56′W

- Municipality
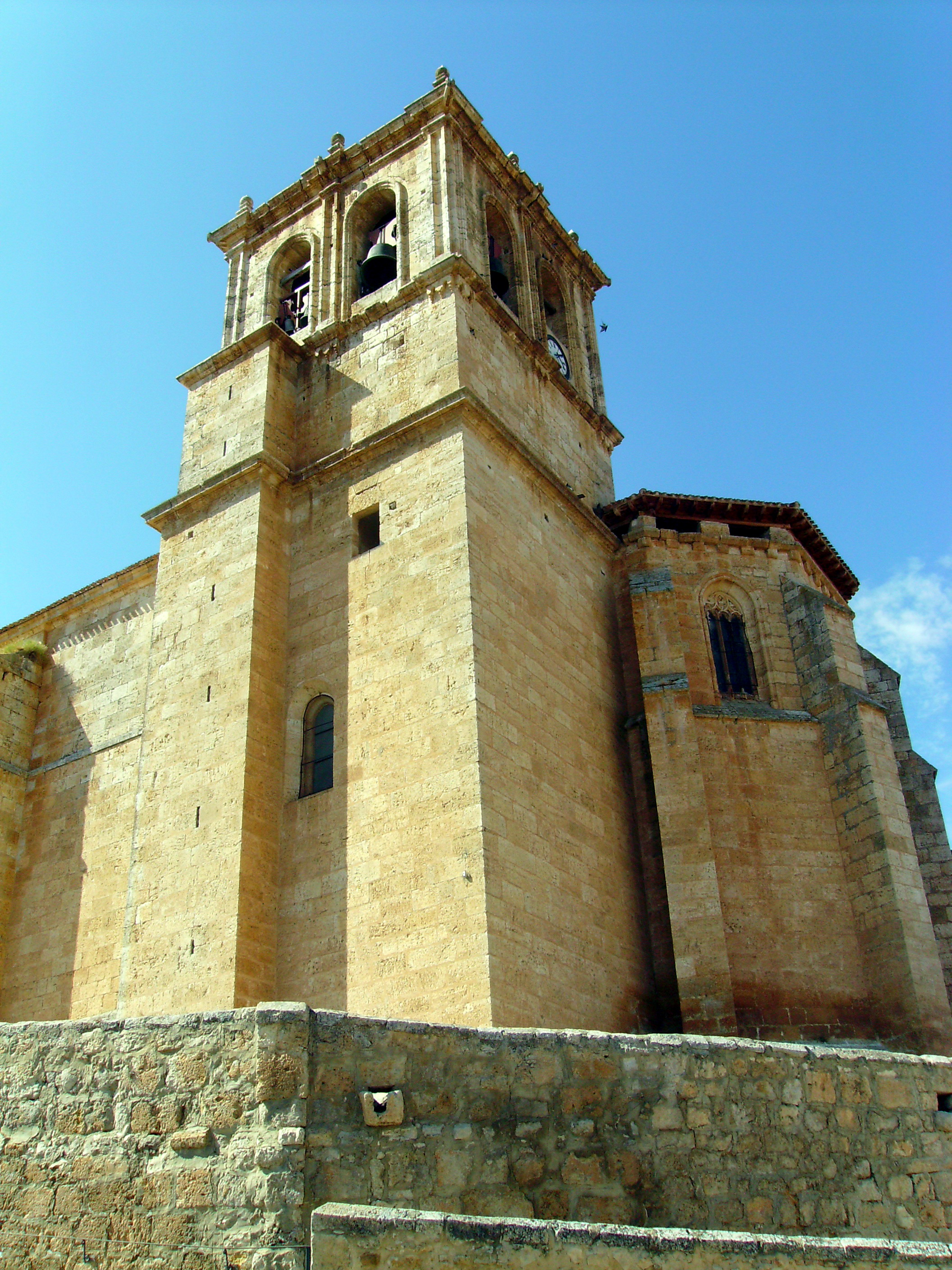
- Church of Olmedillo de Roa, a View from below
- Interactive map of Olmedillo de Roa
- Country: Spain
- Autonomous community: Castile and León
- Province: Burgos
- Comarca: Ribera del Duero

Area
  - Total: 26 km^{2} (10 sq mi)
- Elevation: 854 m (2,802 ft)

Population (2025-01-01)
  - Total: 188
  - Density: 7.2/km^{2} (19/sq mi)
- Time zone: UTC+1 (CET)
  - Summer (DST): UTC+2 (CEST)
- Postal code: 09311
- Website: https://www.olmedilloderoa.es/

Olmedillo de Roa is a municipality and town located in the province of Burgos, Castile and León, Spain. According to the 2004 census (INE), the municipality has a population of 194 inhabitants.
