= Fuentelcésped =

Coordinates: 41°35′N 3°38′W

- Municipality and town
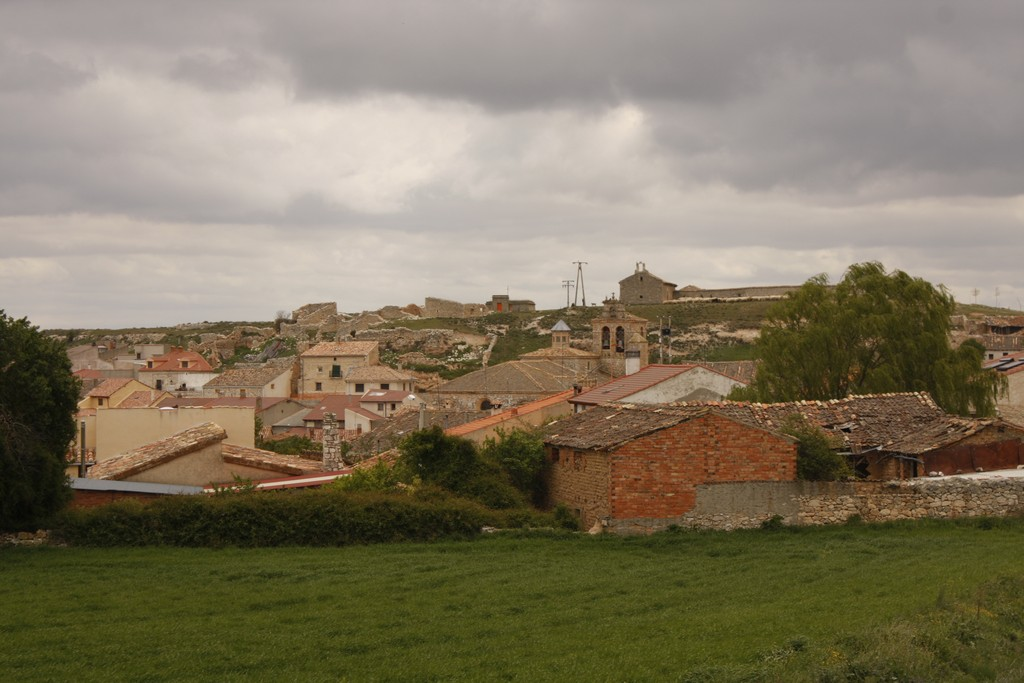
- View of Fuentelcésped, 2010

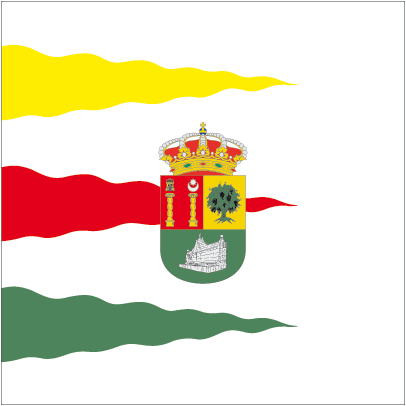
- Flag Coat of arms
- Interactive map of Fuentelcésped
- Country: Spain
- Autonomous community: Castile and León
- Province: Burgos
- Comarca: Ribera del Duero

Area
  - Total: 22.424 km^{2} (8.658 sq mi)
- Elevation: 892 m (2,927 ft)

Population (2025-01-01)
  - Total: 290
  - Density: 13/km^{2} (33/sq mi)
- Time zone: UTC+1 (CET)
  - Summer (DST): UTC+2 (CEST)
- Postal code: 09471
- Website: http://fuentelcesped.burgos.es/

Fuentelcésped is a municipality located in the province of Burgos, Castile and León, Spain. According to the 2004 census (INE), the municipality has a population of 194 inhabitants.
