= Moradillo de Roa =

Coordinates: 41°33′N 3°47′W

- Municipality
- Coat of arms
- Interactive map of Moradillo de Roa
- Country: Spain
- Autonomous community: Castile and León
- Province: Burgos
- Comarca: Ribera del Duero

Area
  - Total: 11 km^{2} (4.2 sq mi)
- Elevation: 920 m (3,020 ft)

Population (2025-01-01)
  - Total: 167
  - Density: 15/km^{2} (39/sq mi)
- Time zone: UTC+1 (CET)
  - Summer (DST): UTC+2 (CEST)
- Postal code: 09462
- Website: https://www.moradilloderoa.es/

Moradillo de Roa is a municipality and town located in the province of Burgos, Castile and León, Spain. According to the 2004 census (INE), the municipality has a population of 209 inhabitants.

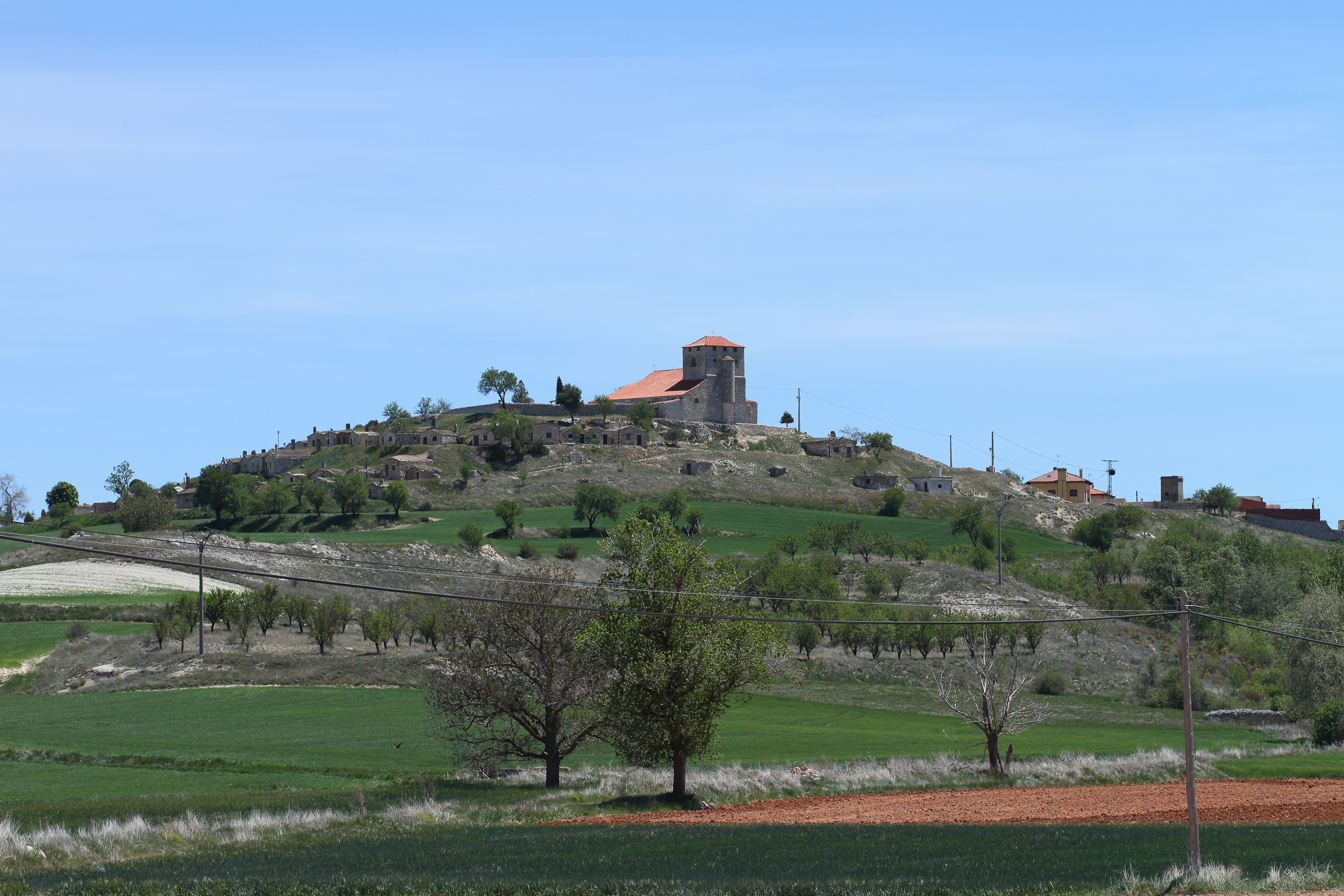
View of Moradillo de Roa from BU-202 Road
