= Nava de Roa =

- Municipality
- Interactive map of Nava de Roa
- Coordinates: 41°36′46″N 3°57′51″W
- Country: Spain
- Autonomous community: Castile and León
- Province: Burgos
- Comarca: Ribera del Duero

Area
  - Total: 22 km^{2} (8.5 sq mi)
- Elevation: 794 m (2,605 ft)

Population (2025-01-01)
  - Total: 202
  - Density: 9.2/km^{2} (24/sq mi)
- Time zone: UTC+1 (CET)
  - Summer (DST): UTC+2 (CEST)
- Postal code: 09318
- Website: http://www.navaderoa.es/

Nava de Roa is a municipality and town located in the municipality of Ribera del Duero, province of Burgos, Castile and León, Spain. It is located 92 km from Burgos, 26 km from Aranda de Duero, and 70 km from Valladolis. As of 2025, the municipality has a population of 202 inhabitants.

== Origin of its name ==
The name "Nava" has pre-Roman origins and means"flat land surrounded by hills." The village is mainly known for the quality of its Designation of Origin Ribera del Duero wines.

Nava de Roa has an important historical heritage in religious buildings. The parish church of San Antolín Mártir is from the 17th century and was developed in the XVIII. It has a Baroque façade and neoclassic tower. Inside, there is an altarpiece which was built by Pedro Cicarte, decorated by Pedro Pérez and there is also a baptismal font from the 16th century. There is also a Gothic Christ of large dimensions, probably from the 14th century.

The chapel of Santa Ana, located on the Monte Calvario, is of Baroque style but it has not been conserved and it currently remains in ruins. The municipal cemetery can be found on its premises and on the hillsides, the characteristic wine cellars and remains of old wine-presses can be seen.

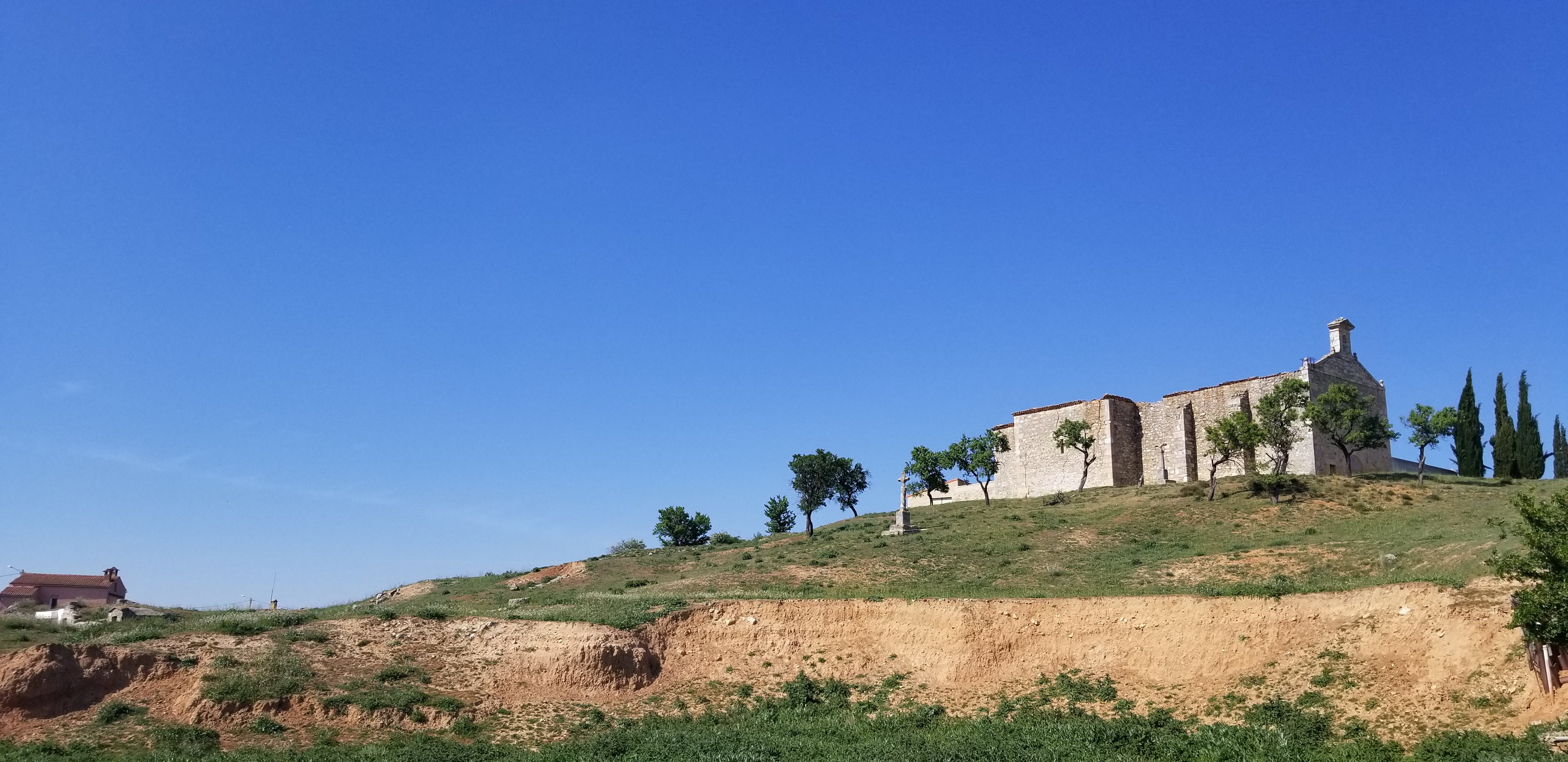

Lastly, it is possible to see models of popular architecture with wooden framework in its walls, which survived the fire of Nava de Roa in the 19th century.

Wheat, barley, and beetroot are grown in the village. More importantly grapes are also grown in the village, of which Designation of Origin wines are made. There are two wineries dedicated to its production and use: Montebellón Winery and Vineyards and Señorío de Nava Winery.

== History ==
The village emerged from the medieval repopulation during the 10th and 11th centuries; its greatest period of glory was between the 16th and the 18th centuries. It benefited from being a hub of communication and a cross roads (Valladolid-Soria- and Segovia-Zaragoza). In 1591, the community had 1,569 residents.

At the fall of the old regime it remained constituted as the Town Council of the judicial district of Roa with 186 dwellings and 605 residents.

The 19th century marked the decline of Nava de Roa with two incidents: the total destruction (1836) in the period of the First Carlist War by General Miguel Gómez Damas and the Phylloxera Plague which eliminated the vineyards of the area, and, therefore, its economy. The decrease in population until this very day has been continuous.

The feast day of San Antolín Mártir is celebrated on September 2 and is of major local importance. The feast day of San Gregorio Nacianceno is locally celebrated, on May 9.
