= Fuentenebro =

Coordinates: 41°32′N 3°45′W

- Municipality and town
- Coat of arms
- Interactive map of Fuentenebro
- Country: Spain
- Autonomous community: Castile and León
- Province: Burgos
- Comarca: Ribera del Duero

Area
  - Total: 39 km^{2} (15 sq mi)
- Elevation: 911 m (2,989 ft)

Population (2025-01-01)
  - Total: 137
  - Density: 3.5/km^{2} (9.1/sq mi)
- Time zone: UTC+1 (CET)
  - Summer (DST): UTC+2 (CEST)
- Postal code: 09461
- Website: http://www.fuentenebro.es/

Fuentenebro is a municipality located in the province of Burgos, Castile and León, Spain. According to the 2015 census (INE), the municipality has a population of 139 inhabitants.

== Geography ==
It is a village located at the south of the Province of Burgos at 840 meters of altitude, it lies 100 km from the city of Burgos and 20 km from Aranda de Duero.

Its area is 38,92 km^{2} and its population is 139 inhabitants (INE 2009) Its density is 3.57 inhabitants/km^{2}.

Peñacuerno mountain (1,377 m) is located in its municipality, being the southernmost point in the province.

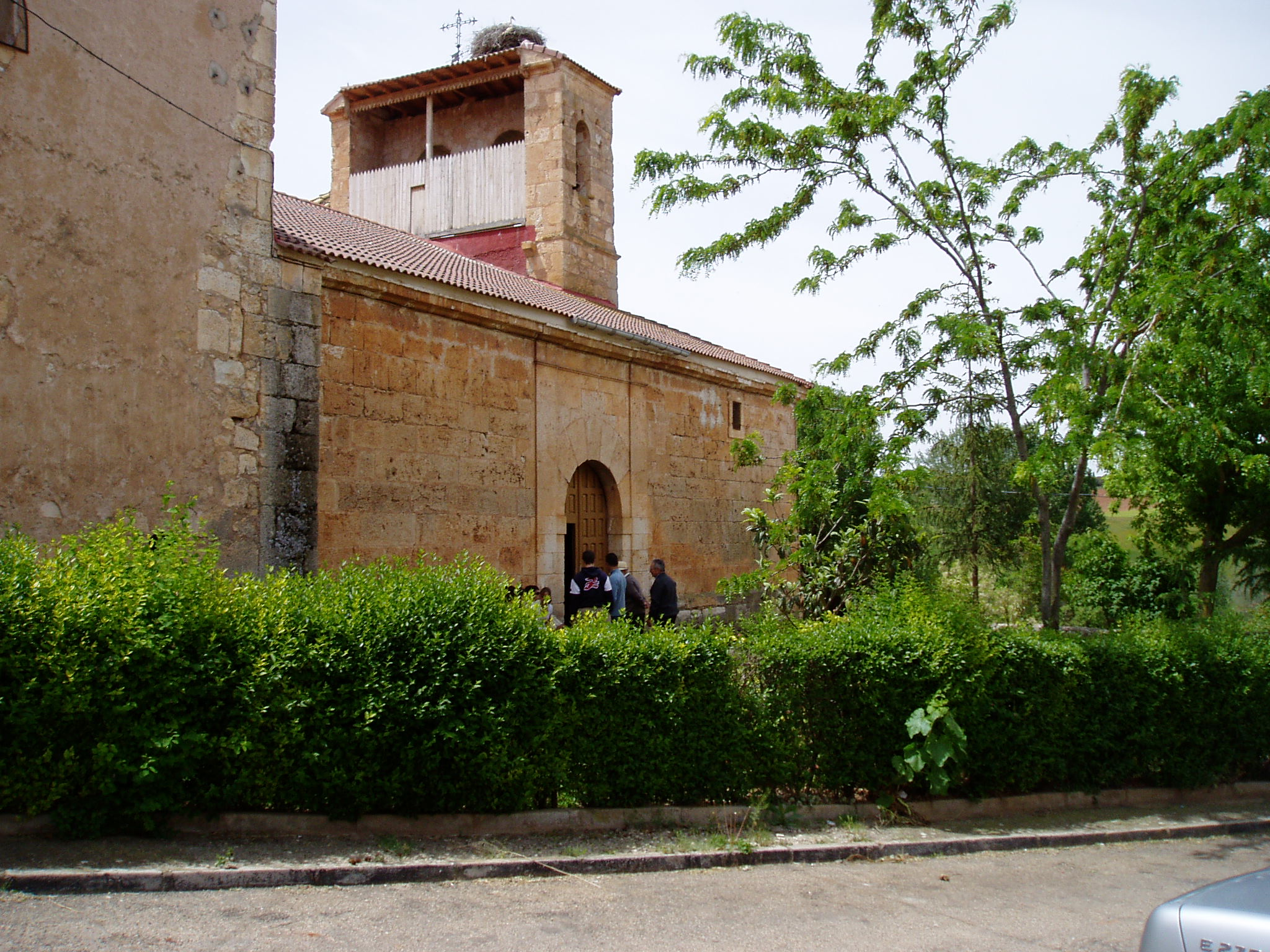
The Church of Fuentenebro
