= Ribera del Duero (comarca) =

Coordinates: 41°42′17″N 3°43′35″W

- Comarca
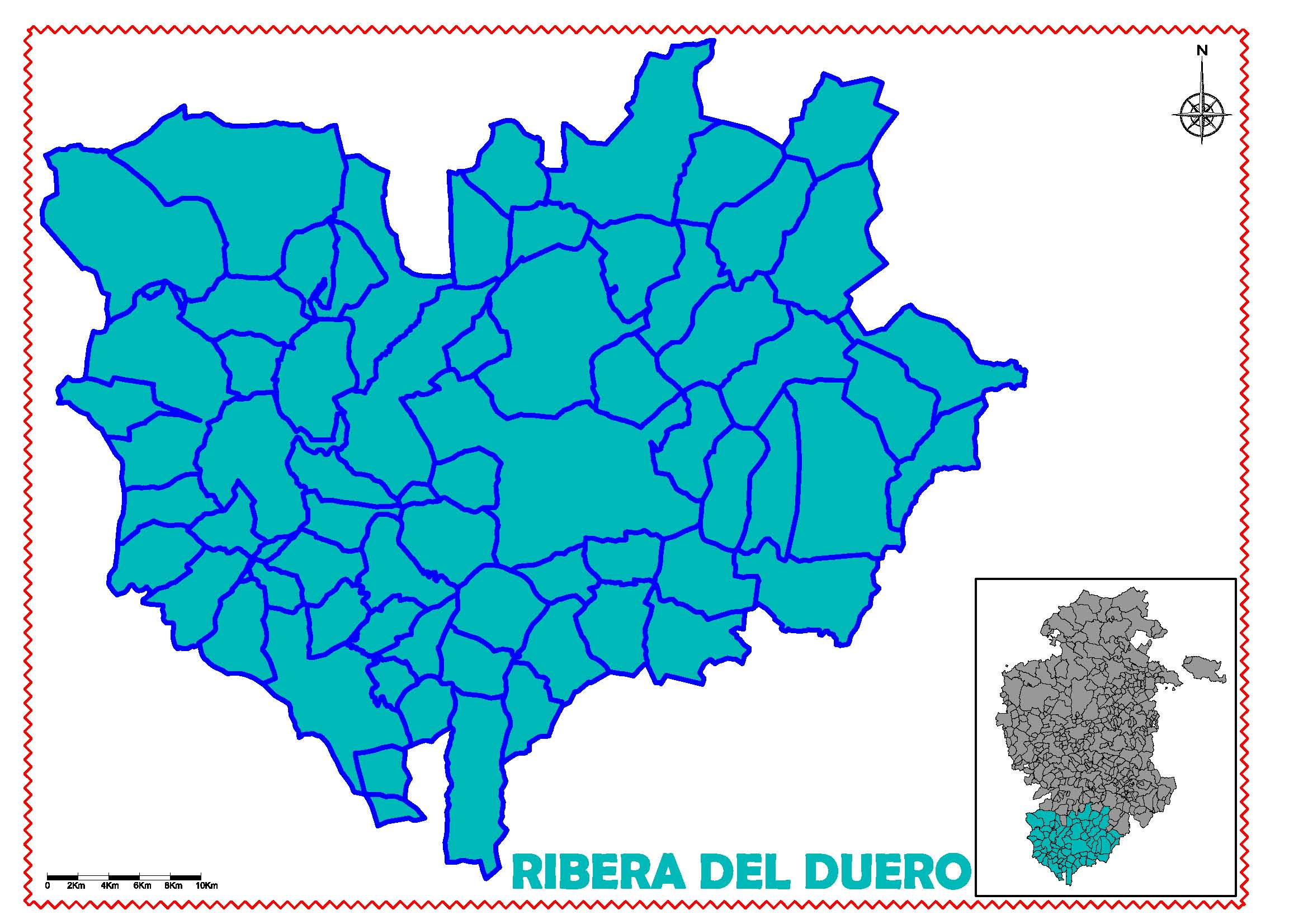
- Country: Spain
- Autonomous community: Castile and León
- Province: Burgos
- Capital: Aranda de Duero
- Time zone: UTC+1 (CET)
  - Summer (DST): UTC+2 (CEST)
- Largest municipality: Aranda de Duero

The Ribera del Duero is a comarca or district located at the southern tip of the province of Burgos, part of the Spanish autonomous community of Castile and León. The capital of the Ribera del Duero comarca or district is the town of Aranda de Duero.

The Ribera del Duero comarca slightly overlaps the Ribera del Duero D.O. wine region but only in the province of Burgos. The Ribera del Duero D.O. wine region stretches about 115km along "the banks of the river Duero" touching the provinces of Soria, Burgos, Segovia and Valladolid. It is bounded on the north by Arlanza comarca, south by the Province of Segovia, on the east by the province of Valladolid and on the west by the Sierra de la Demanda comarca and the province of Soria.

There are about 68 towns and villages (mostly villages) in the Ribera del Duero comarca.

== History ==
Ribera del Duero was repopulated mainly by Astur, Cantabri, Visigothic, ... origins and Mozarab after the border of Castile County and the kingdom of Cordoba reach the river Duero.

== Geography ==
The waters of the river Duero run from east to west all the shire.

== Towns & Villages in the Ribera del Duero comarca/district ==
- Adrada de Haza
- Anguix
- Aranda de Duero
- Arandilla
- Bahabón de Esgueva
- Baños de Valdearados
- Berlangas de Roa
- Brazacorta
- Cabañes de Esgueva
- Caleruega
- Campillo de Aranda
- Castrillo de la Vega
- Cilleruelo de Arriba
- Coruña del Conde
- Cueva de Roa, La
- Fresnillo de las Dueñas
- Fuentecén
- Fuentelcésped
- Fuentelisendo
- Fuentemolinos
- Fuentenebro
- Fuentespina
- Gumiel de Izán
- Gumiel de Mercado
- Haza
- Hontangas
- Hontoria de Valdearados
- Horra, La
- Hoyales de Roa
- Mambrilla de Castrejón
- Milagros
- Moradillo de Roa
- Nava de Roa
- Olmedillo de Roa
- Oquillas
- Pardilla
- Pedrosa de Duero
- Peñaranda de Duero
- Pineda Trasmonte
- Pinilla Trasmonte
- Quemada
- Quintana del Pidio
- Roa
- San Juan del Monte
- San Martín de Rubiales
- Santa Cruz de la Salceda
- Santa María del Mercadillo
- Santibáñez de Esgueva
- Sequera de Haza, La
- Sotillo de la Ribera
- Terradillos de Esgueva
- Torresandino
- Tórtoles de Esgueva
- Tubilla del Lago
- Vadocondes
- Valdeande
- Valdezate
- Vid y Barrios, La
- Villaescusa de Roa
- Villalba de Duero
- Villalbilla de Gumiel
- Villanueva de Gumiel
- Villatuelda
- Zazuar

== See also ==
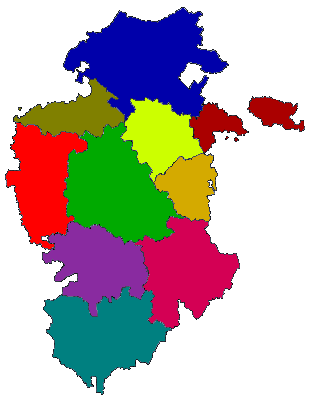
Shires of the province of Burgos.: Páramos Alfoz de Burgos Odra y Pisuerga Arlanza Ribera del Duero / Merindades Ebro La Bureba Montes de Oca Sierra de la Demanda

- Ribera del Duero wine region
