= Pinilla Trasmonte =

Coordinates: 41.8736°N 3.62°W

- Municipality and town
- Interactive map of Pinilla Trasmonte
- Country: Spain
- Autonomous community: Castile and León
- Province: Burgos
- Comarca: Ribera del Duero

Area
  - Total: 68 km^{2} (26 sq mi)
- Elevation: 935 m (3,068 ft)

Population (2025-01-01)
  - Total: 152
  - Density: 2.2/km^{2} (5.8/sq mi)
- Time zone: UTC+1 (CET)
  - Summer (DST): UTC+2 (CEST)
- Postal code: 09354
- Website: www.pinillatrasmonte.es

Pinilla Trasmonte is a municipality and town located in the province of Burgos, Castile and León, Spain. According to the 2004 census (INE), the municipality has a population of 214 inhabitants.
