= Fuentemolinos =

Coordinates: 41°36′N 3°51′W

- Municipality
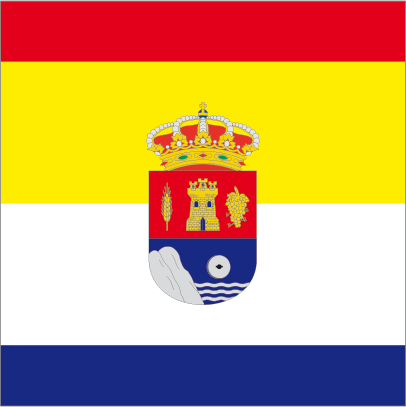
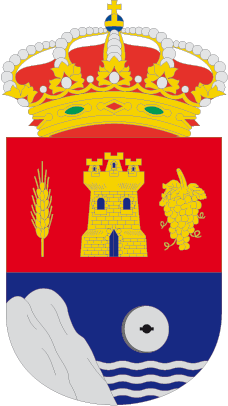
- Flag Coat of arms
- Interactive map of Fuentemolinos
- Country: Spain
- Autonomous community: Castile and León
- Province: Burgos
- Comarca: Ribera del Duero

Area
  - Total: 13 km^{2} (5.0 sq mi)
- Elevation: 872 m (2,861 ft)

Population (2025-01-01)
  - Total: 89
  - Density: 6.8/km^{2} (18/sq mi)
- Time zone: UTC+1 (CET)
  - Summer (DST): UTC+2 (CEST)
- Postal code: 09315
- Website: http://www.fuentemolinos.es/

Fuentemolinos is a municipality located in the province of Burgos, Castile and León, Spain. According to the 2004 census (INE), the municipality has a population of 115 inhabitants.

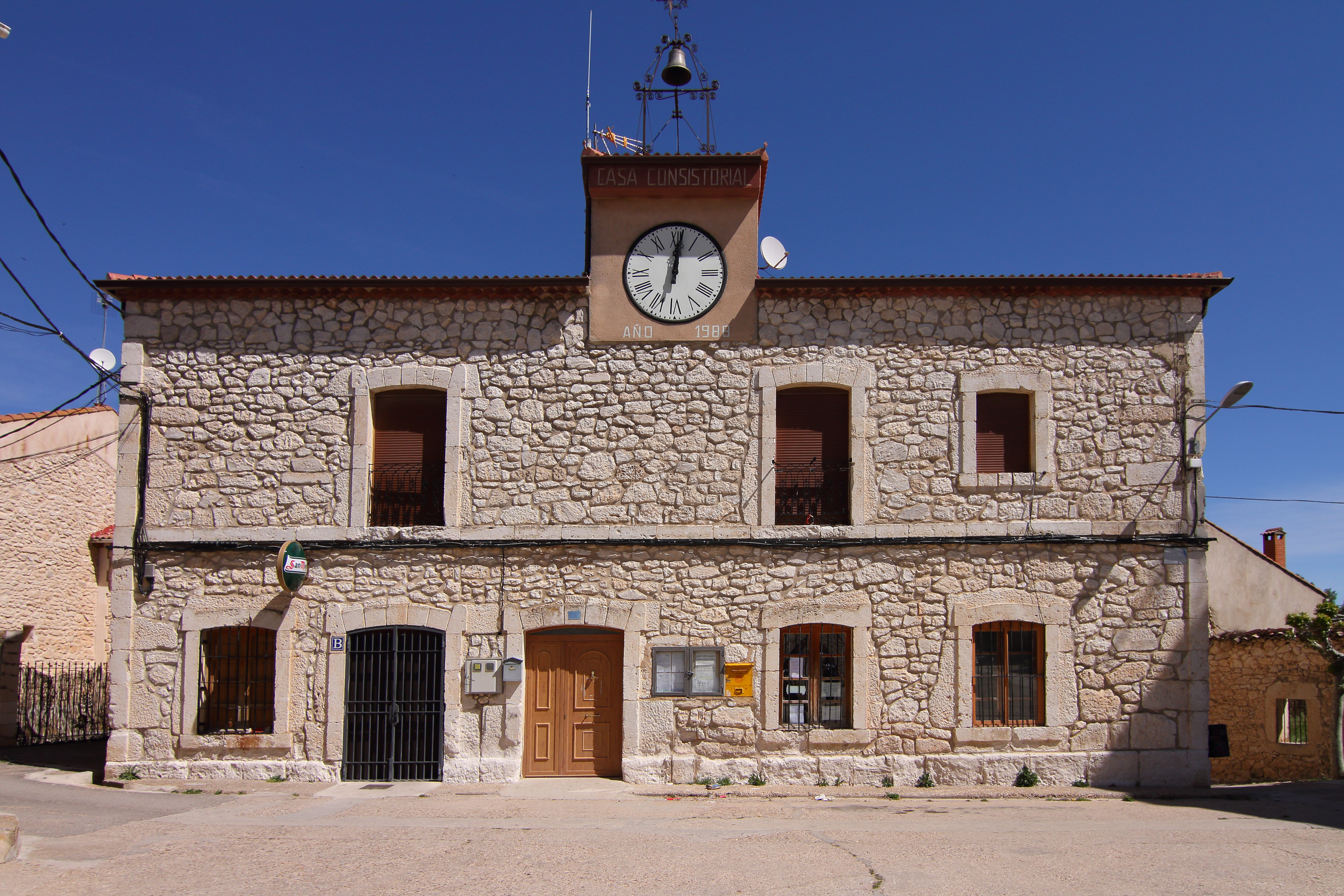
Fuentemolinos Town hall
