= San Martín de Rubiales =

Coordinates: 41°39′N 3°59′W

- Municipality and town
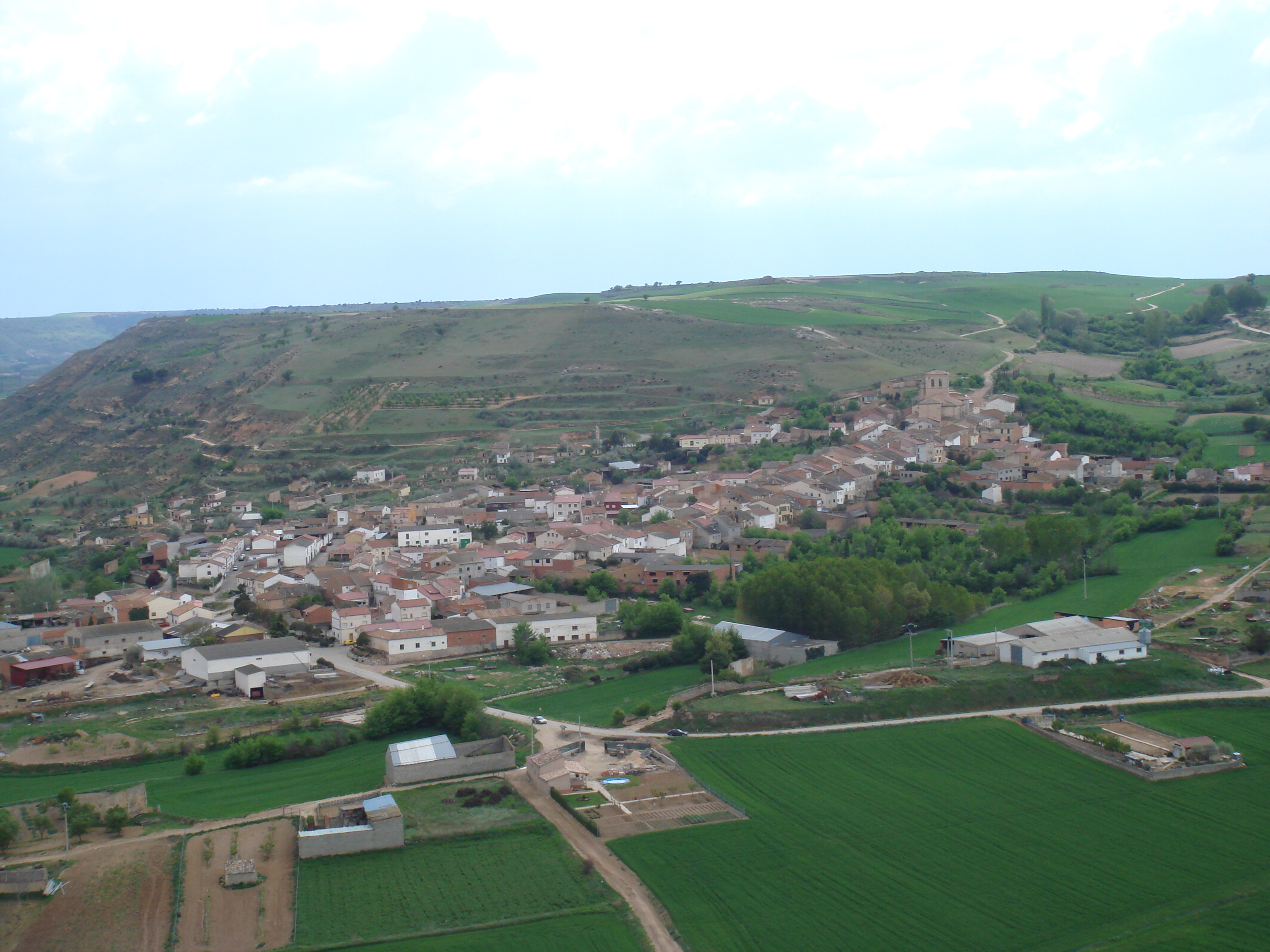
- View of San Martín de Rubiales from Socastillo, 2007

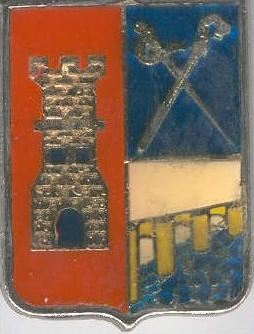
- Coat of arms
- Interactive map of San Martín de Rubiales
- Country: Spain
- Autonomous community: Castile and León
- Province: Burgos
- Comarca: Ribera del Duero

Area
  - Total: 19.40 km^{2} (7.49 sq mi)
- Elevation: 809 m (2,654 ft)

Population (2025-01-01)
  - Total: 137
  - Density: 7.06/km^{2} (18.3/sq mi)
- Time zone: UTC+1 (CET)
  - Summer (DST): UTC+2 (CEST)
- Postal code: 09317
- Website: http://www.sanmartinderubiales.es/

San Martín de Rubiales is a municipality and town located in the province of Burgos, Castile and León, Spain. According to the 2004 census (INE), the municipality has a population of 217 inhabitants. San Martín de Rubiales is located in the La Ribera region.

The most important monument in the city is the San Martin church. It is a Romanesque temple from the 13th century. The city was founded in Roman times, and is important on the Jacobin route.
