= Tubilla del Lago =

Coordinates: 41°48′N 3°35′W

- Municipality
- Coat of arms
- Interactive map of Tubilla del Lago
- Country: Spain
- Autonomous community: Castile and León
- Province: Burgos
- Comarca: Ribera del Duero

Area
  - Total: 23.21 km^{2} (8.96 sq mi)
- Elevation: 894 m (2,933 ft)

Population (2025-01-01)
  - Total: 164
  - Density: 7.07/km^{2} (18.3/sq mi)
- Time zone: UTC+1 (CET)
  - Summer (DST): UTC+2 (CEST)
- Postal code: 09453
- Website: www.tubilladellago.es

Tubilla del Lago is a municipality located in the province of Burgos, Castile and León, Spain. According to the 2004 census (INE), the municipality had a population of 170 inhabitants.

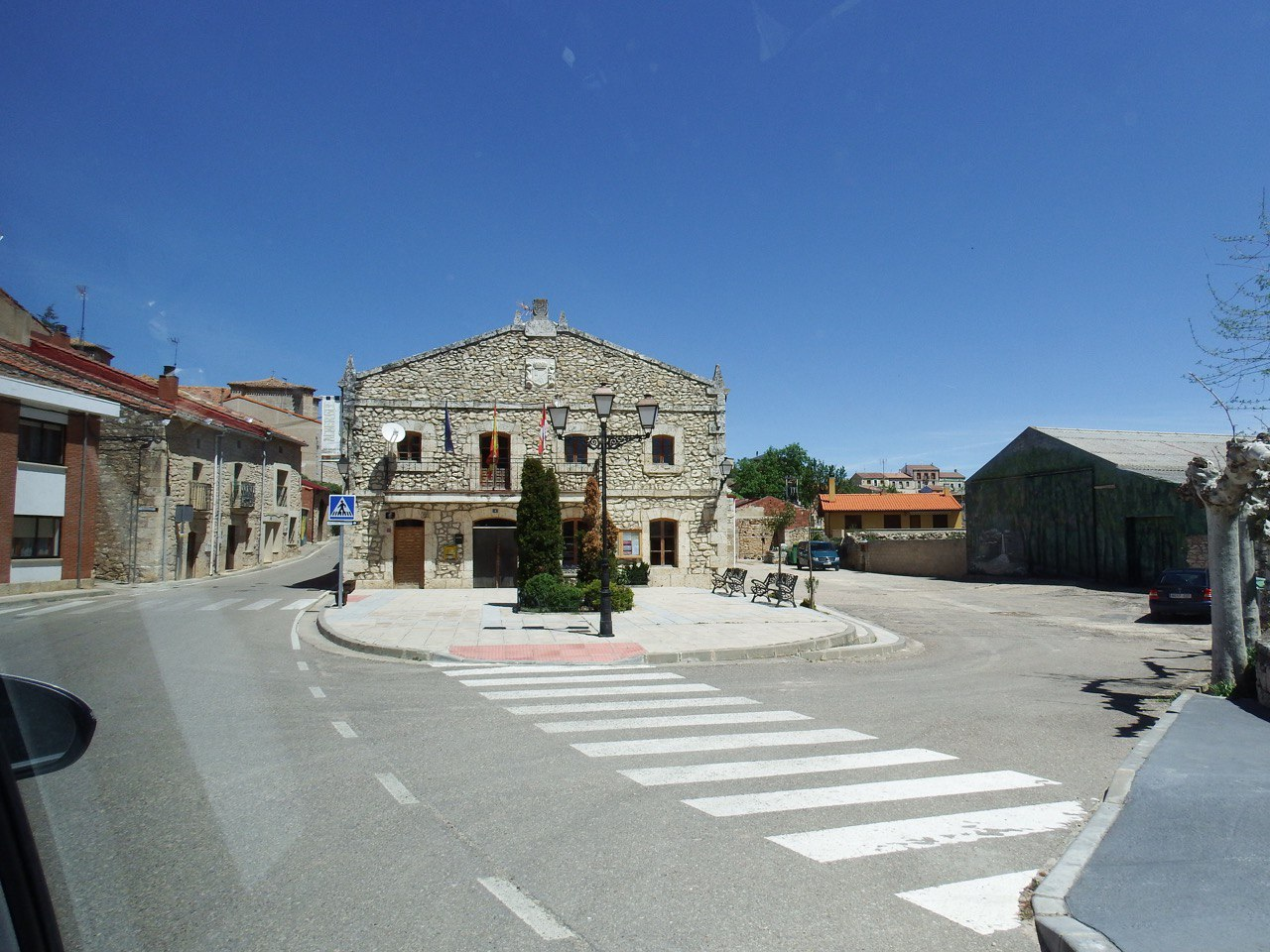
Tubilla del Lago Local Council
