= Gumiel de Izán =

Coordinates: 41°46′24″N 3°41′17″W

- Municipality and town
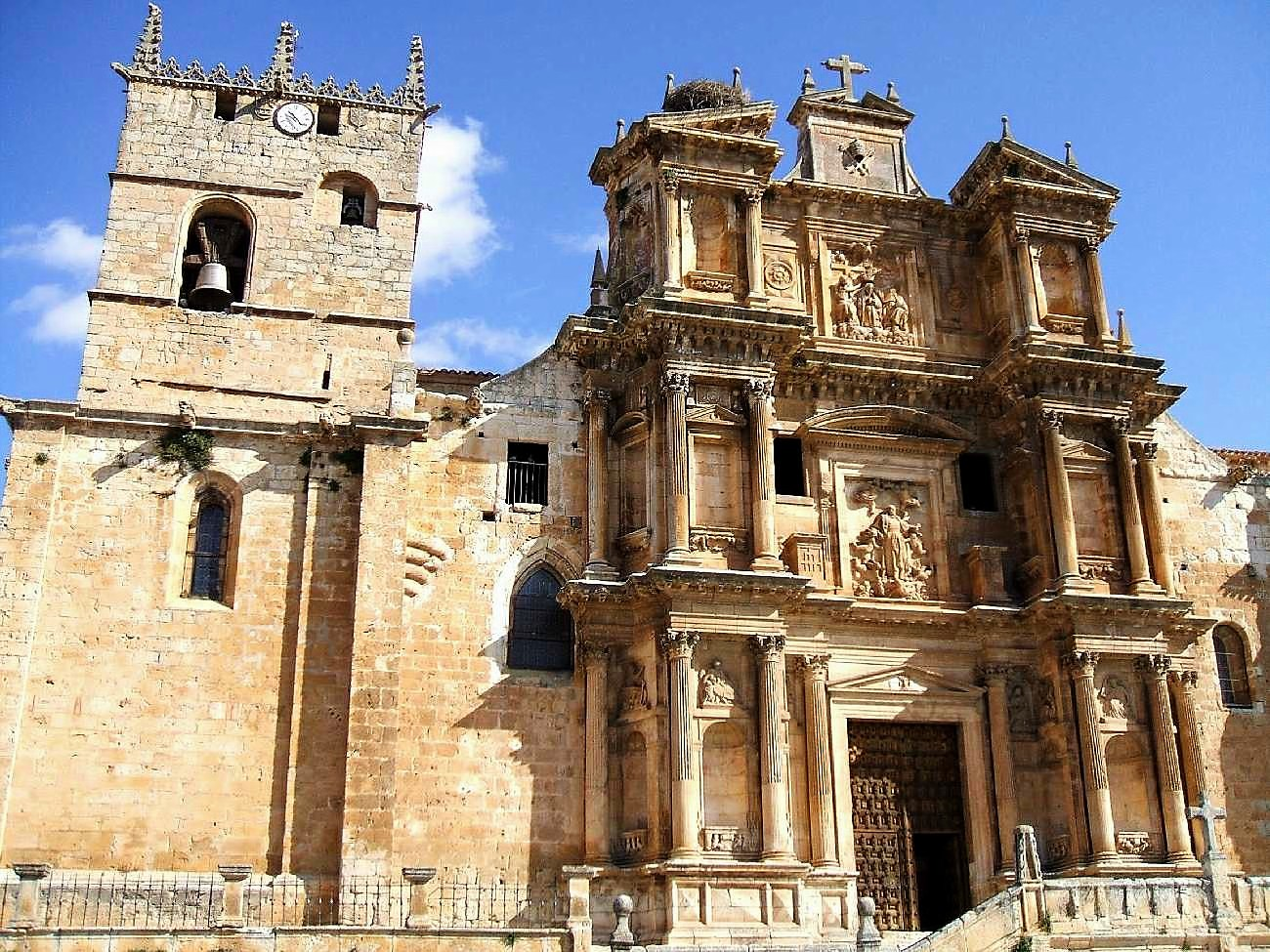
- La Asunción de la Virgen María church (15th-17th century)
- Interactive map of Gumiel de Izán
- Country: Spain
- Autonomous community: Castile and León
- Province: Burgos
- Comarca: Ribera del Duero

Area
  - Total: 75 km^{2} (29 sq mi)
- Elevation: 853 m (2,799 ft)

Population (2025-01-01)
  - Total: 587
  - Density: 7.8/km^{2} (20/sq mi)
- Time zone: UTC+1 (CET)
  - Summer (DST): UTC+2 (CEST)
- Postal code: 09370
- Website: http://www.gumieldeizan.com/

Spanish Cultural Heritage
- Type: Non-movable
- Criteria: Historic ensemble
- Designated: 27 November 2003
- Reference no.: RI-53-0000585

Gumiel de Izán (formerly Gumiel de Hizán) is a municipality located in the province of Burgos, Castile and León, Spain. According to the 2004 census (INE), the municipality had a population of 665 inhabitants.
