= Hontoria de Valdearados =

Coordinates: 41°45′N 3°31′W

- Municipality
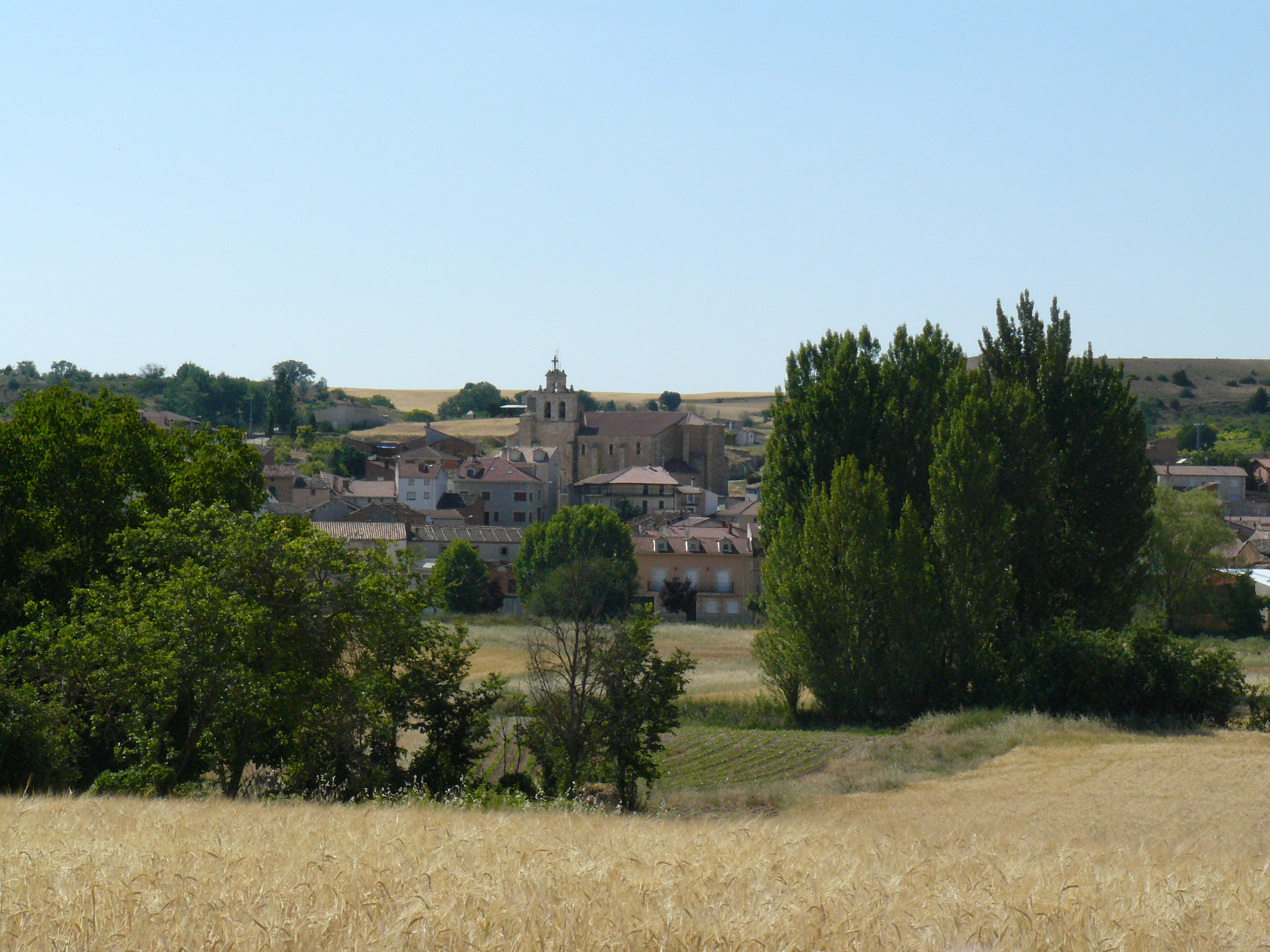
- View of Hontoria de Valdearados, 2011

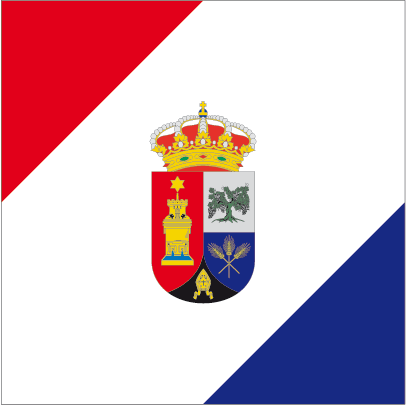
- Flag Coat of arms
- Interactive map of Hontoria de Valdearados
- Country: Spain
- Autonomous community: Castile and León
- Province: Burgos
- Comarca: Ribera del Duero

Area
  - Total: 33 km^{2} (13 sq mi)
- Elevation: 870 m (2,850 ft)

Population (2025-01-01)
  - Total: 152
  - Density: 4.6/km^{2} (12/sq mi)
- Time zone: UTC+1 (CET)
  - Summer (DST): UTC+2 (CEST)
- Postal code: 09450

Hontoria de Valdearados is a municipality located in the province of Burgos, Castile and León, Spain. According to the 2004 census (INE), the municipality has a population of 236 inhabitants.
