= Arlanza (comarca) =

Coordinates: 42.0471°N 3.7222°W

- Comarca
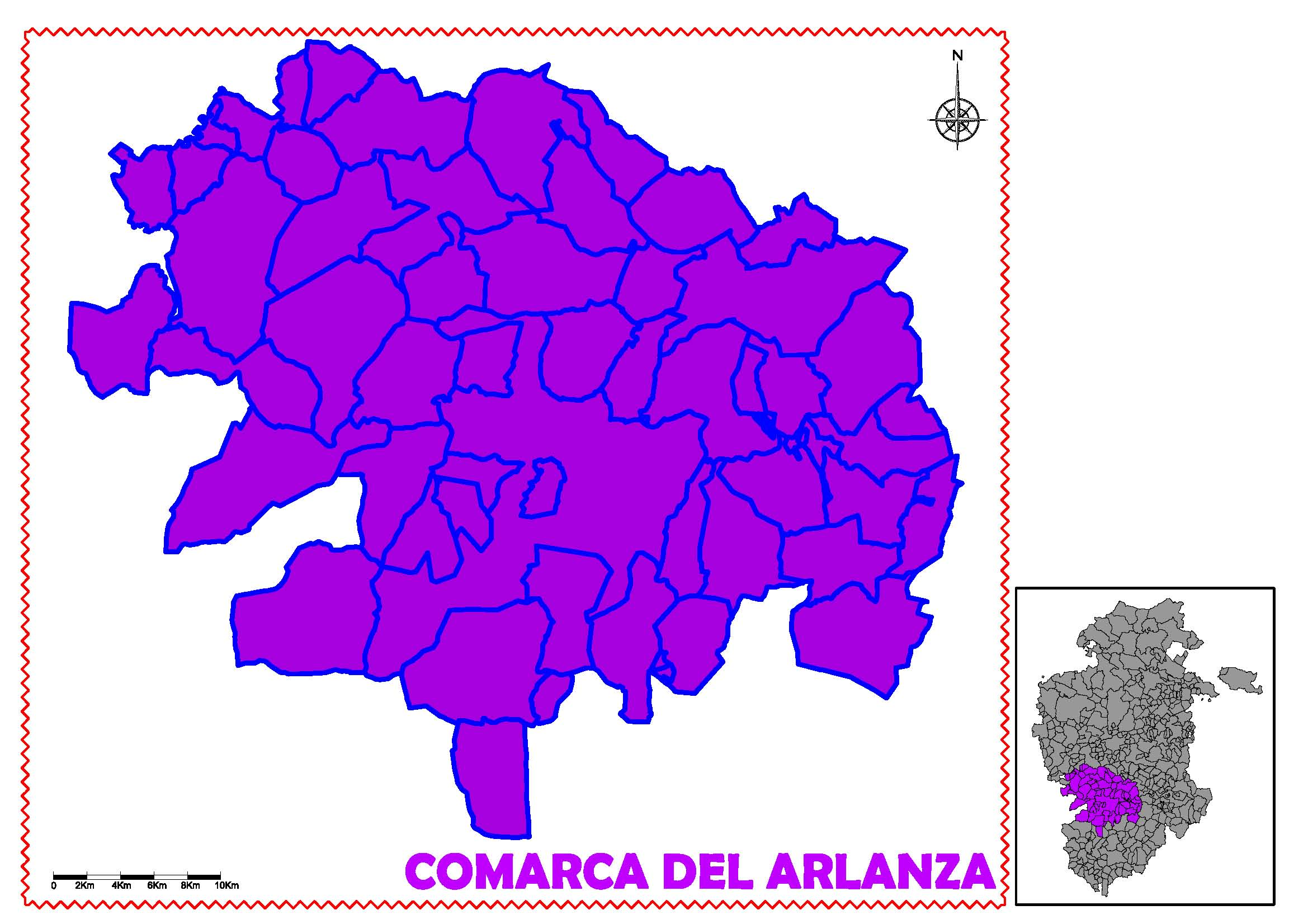
- Country: Spain
- Autonomous community: Castile and León
- Province: Burgos
- Capital: Lerma
- Time zone: UTC+1 (CET)
  - Summer (DST): UTC+2 (CEST)
- Largest municipality: Lerma

Comarca del Arlanza is a comarca located south-west of the province of Burgos in the autonomous community of Castile and León. It is bounded on the north by the Odra-Pisuerga and the Alfoz de Burgos, south by the Ribera del Duero, on the east by the province of Palencia and west by the Sierra de la Demanda.

== Administrative Entities ==
The comarca capital is Lerma.

=== Municipalities ===
There are 44 municipalities:

- Avellanosa de Muñó(3)
- Cebrecos
- Ciadoncha
- Cilleruelo de Abajo
- Cilleruelo de Arriba
- Ciruelos de Cervera (1)
- Covarrubias (1)
- Cuevas de San Clemente
- Fontioso
- Hortigüela
- Iglesiarrubia
- Lerma (6)
- Madrigal del Monte (1)
- Madrigalejo del Monte (1)
- Mahamud
- Mazuela
- Mecerreyes
- Nebreda
- Olmillos de Muñó
- Peral de Arlanza
- Presencio
- Puentedura
- Quintanilla de la Mata
- Quintanilla del Coco (1)
- Quintanilla del Agua y Tordueles
- Retuerta
- Royuela de Río Franco (1)
- Santa Cecilia
- Santa Inés
- Santa María del Campo
- Santibáñez del Val (1)
- Santibáñez de Esgueva
- Solarana
- Tejada
- Tordómar
- Torrecilla del Monte
- Torrepadre
- Villafruela
- Villahoz
- Villalmanzo
- Villamayor de los Montes
- Villangómez (2)
- Villaverde del Monte (1)
- Zael

== Geography ==
The waters of the river Arlanza originate in the pines forest of Quintanar de la Sierra and flow from East to West. This is due to the fact that the land descends from heights such as Peñas de Cervera (Mount Valdosa, 1412 m) and The Mamblas (1372 m) to the border with Palencia. The comarca receives an average of 647 mm of water, which is an appreciable amount for Burgos.

Most of its soil is dedicated to the sow of the cereal, consequence of a long process of rupture of great extensions of Pines, oaks, junipers and other species that covered enormous extensions. So it is testified by the comarcal names: Pineda Trasmonte, Pinedillo, Nebreda, Avellanosa, Torrecítores del Enebral, Madrigal del Monte, Madrigalejo del Monte o Villamayor de los Montes. Long ago there was a big vegetal charcoal production.

=== Communications ===
Freeways are acceptable: from North to South crosses the national N-I from Madrid to Irun and from west to east the N-622 from Lerma to Palencia. The others comarcal roads are:

- BU-101 from Villahoz to Villaquirán (A-62)
- BU-114 from Quintanilla de la Mata (A-1) to Villafruela
- BU-900 from Lerma to Silos
- BU-901 from Cuevas de San Clemente (N-234) to Silos
- BU-904 from Lerma (A-1) to Covarrubias
- BU-905 from Covarrubias to Hortigüela (N-234)
- BU-910 from Hacinas (N-234) to Caleruega

The train connection between Madrid and Burgos is not very useful due to its neglected state.

== History ==
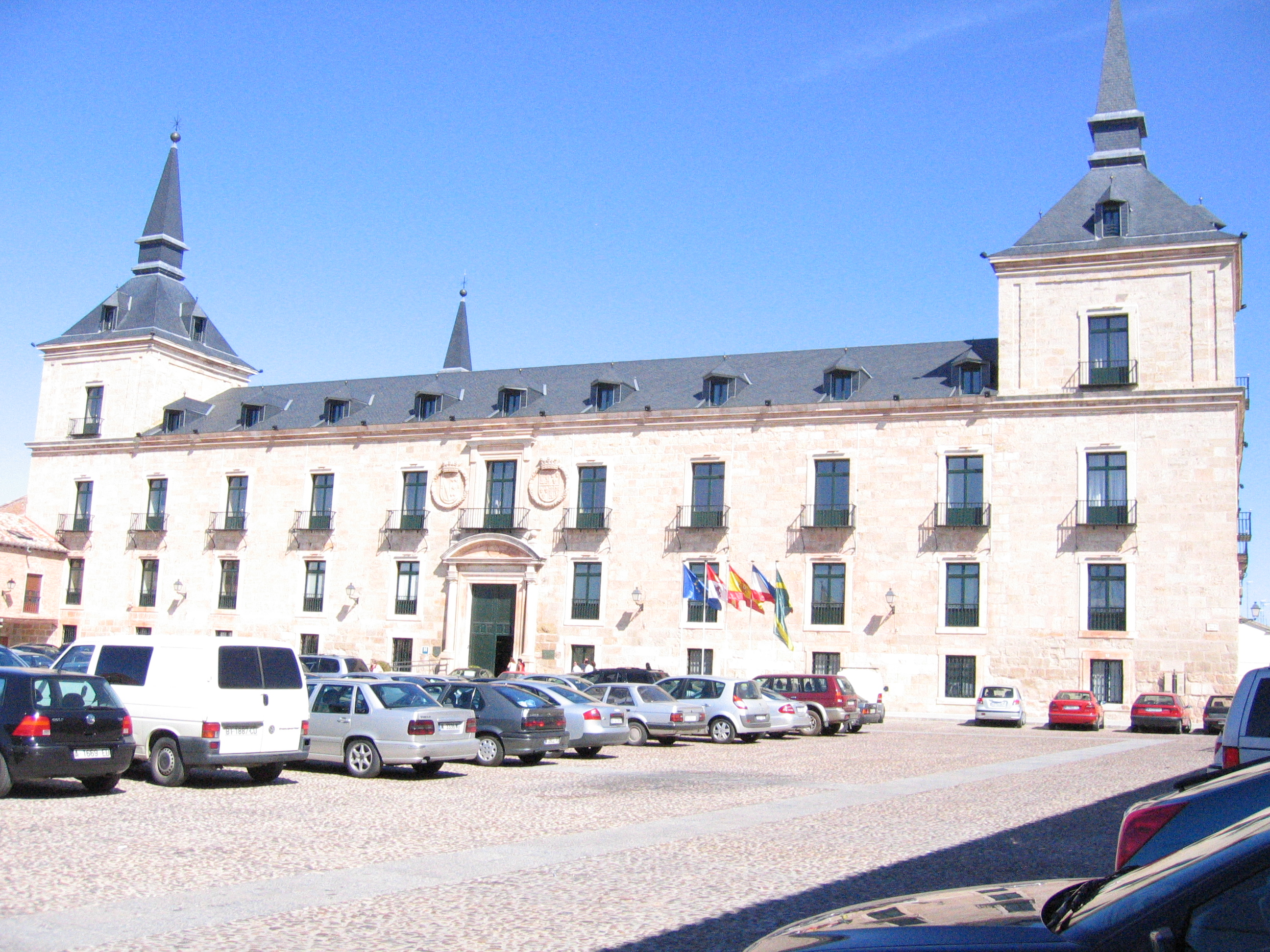
Ducal Palace of Lerma

The Arlanza zone was repopulated mainly by Astur, Cantabri, Visigothic and Mozarab peoples in the mid-ninth century, after the border of the County of Castile and the Kingdom of Córdoba reached the river Duero.

== Relevant towns ==
- Villa Rachela de Covarrubias, an artistic historic place and the old capital of a religious state
- Villa Ducal de Lerma, which was turned by the eponymous Duke into one of the most beautiful urban sets in Spain
- Santa María del Campo, the old capital of Betherías

== Network of trails ==
At the initiative of ADECOAR and with the cooperation of the local councils involved, a network of trails has been marked out. The trails have an average length of approximately 12 kilometers and are distributed across 19 routes, most of which are circular. The aim was for each route to pass through at least two towns in the region. Since there are no steep gradients, they are also suitable for cycling.

== See also ==
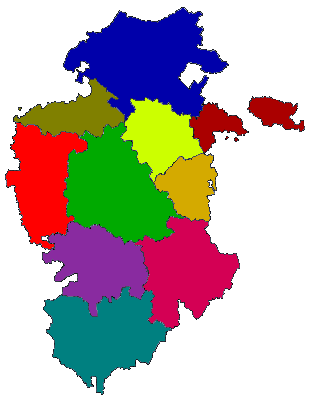
Comarcas of the province of Burgos.: Páramos Alfoz de Burgos Odra y Pisuerga Arlanza Ribera del Duero / Merindades Ebro La Bureba Montes de Oca Sierra de la Demanda

- Province of Burgos
