= Santa Cecilia, Province of Burgos =

Municipality and town in Burgos, Castile and León, Spain

Santa Cecilia
- Municipality and town
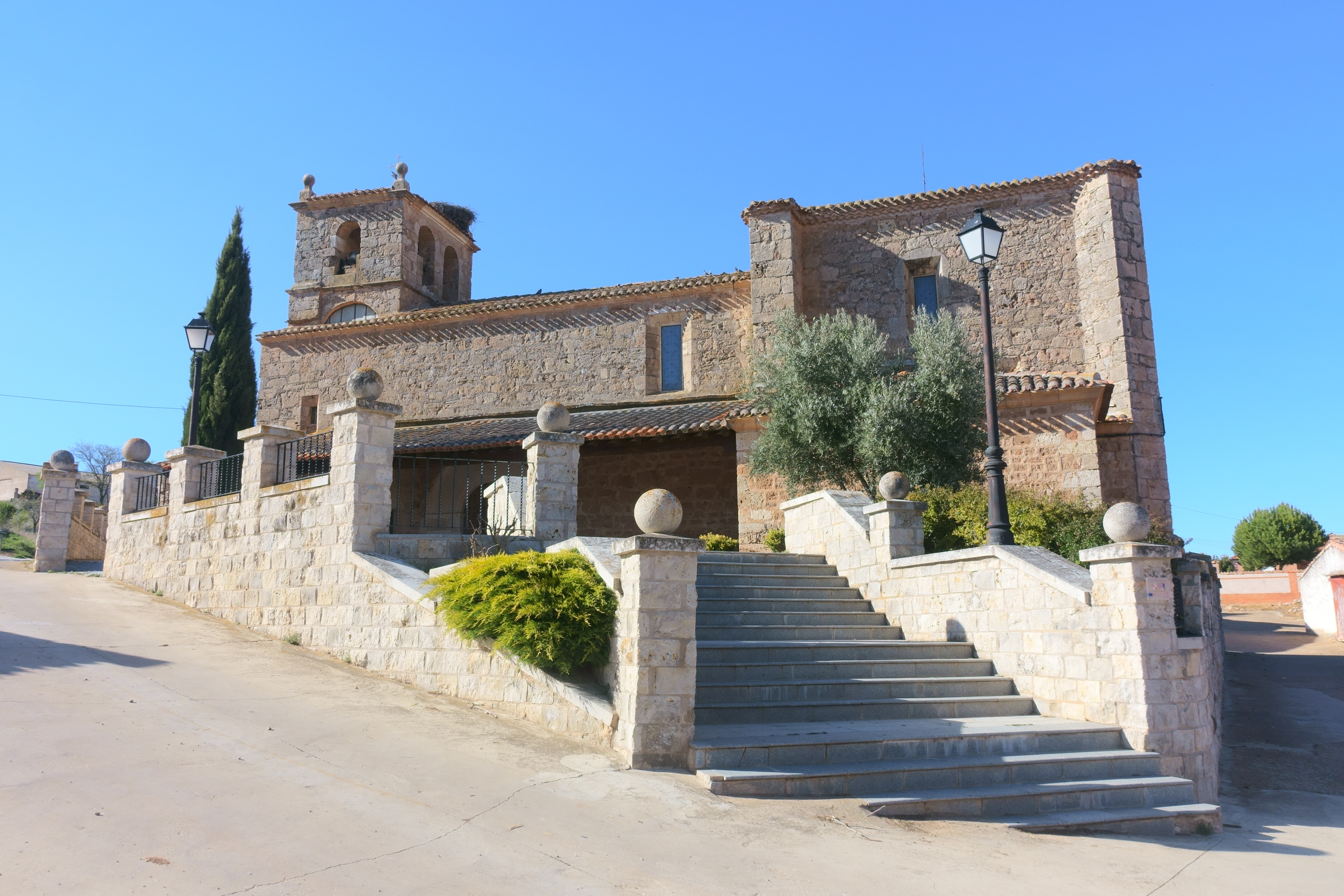
- Church of Santa Cecilia, Santa Cecilia (Burgos, Spain).

- Flag Coat of arms
- Interactive map of Santa Cecilia
- Coordinates: 42°03′07″N 3°48′11″W
- Country: Spain
- Autonomous community: Castile and León
- Province: Burgos
- Comarca: Arlanza

Area
  - Total: 12.46 km^{2} (4.81 sq mi)
- Elevation: 845 m (2,772 ft)

Population (2025-01-01)
  - Total: 107
  - Density: 8.59/km^{2} (22.2/sq mi)
- Time zone: UTC+1 (CET)
  - Summer (DST): UTC+2 (CEST)
- Postal code: 09341
- Website: santacecilia.burgos.es

Santa Cecilia is a municipality and town located in the province of Burgos, Castile and León, Spain. According to the 2004 census (INE), the municipality has a population of 118 inhabitants.
