= Retuerta =

Coordinates: 42°01′48″N 3°30′28″W

- Municipality and town
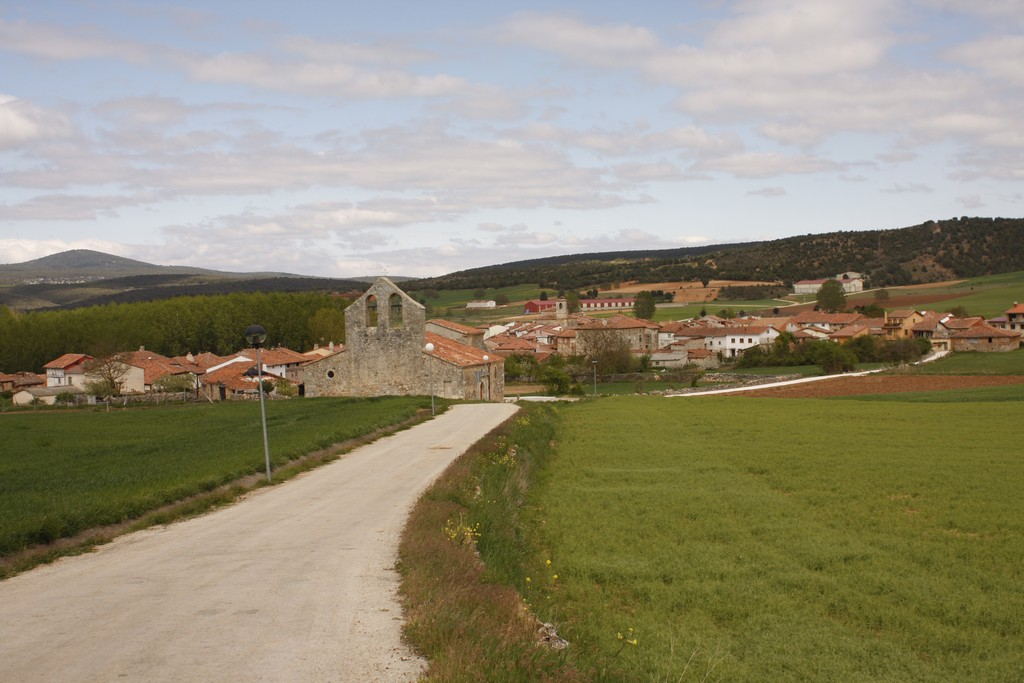
- View of Retuerta, 2010
- Interactive map of Retuerta
- Country: Spain
- Autonomous community: Castile and León
- Province: Burgos
- ≠Comarca: Arlanza

Area
  - Total: 8.54 km^{2} (3.30 sq mi)
- Elevation: 910 m (2,990 ft)

Population (2025-01-01)
  - Total: 56
  - Density: 6.6/km^{2} (17/sq mi)
- Time zone: UTC+1 (CET)
  - Summer (DST): UTC+2 (CEST)
- Postal code: 09347
- Website: http://www.retuerta.es/

Retuerta is a municipality and village located in the province of Burgos, Castile and León, Spain. According to the 2004 census (INE), the municipality had a population of 65 inhabitants.
