= Torrecilla del Monte =

Coordinates: 42°06′N 3°41′W

- Municipality and town
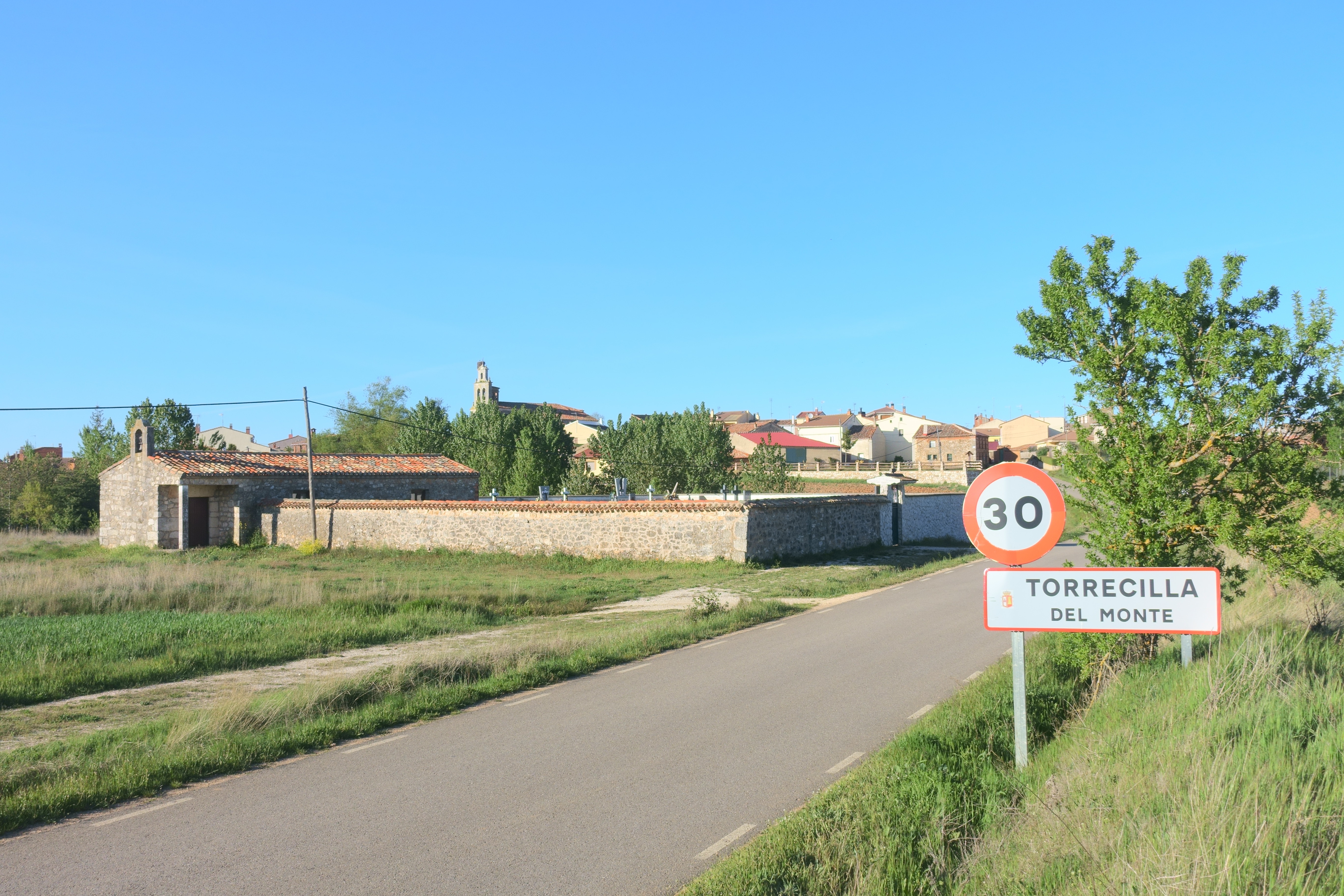
- Entrance to Torrecilla del Monte

- Coat of arms
- Interactive map of Torrecilla del Monte
- Country: Spain
- Autonomous community: Castile and León
- Province: Burgos
- Comarca: Arlanza

Area
  - Total: 14 km^{2} (5.4 sq mi)

Population (2025-01-01)
  - Total: 79
  - Density: 5.6/km^{2} (15/sq mi)
- Time zone: UTC+1 (CET)
  - Summer (DST): UTC+2 (CEST)
- Postal code: 09390
- Website: http://www.torrecilladelmonte.es/

Torrecilla del Monte is a municipality and town located in the province of Burgos, Castile and León, Spain. According to the 2004 census (INE), the municipality has a population of 88 inhabitants.
