= Ciadoncha =

Coordinates: 42°09′N 3°56′W

- Municipality
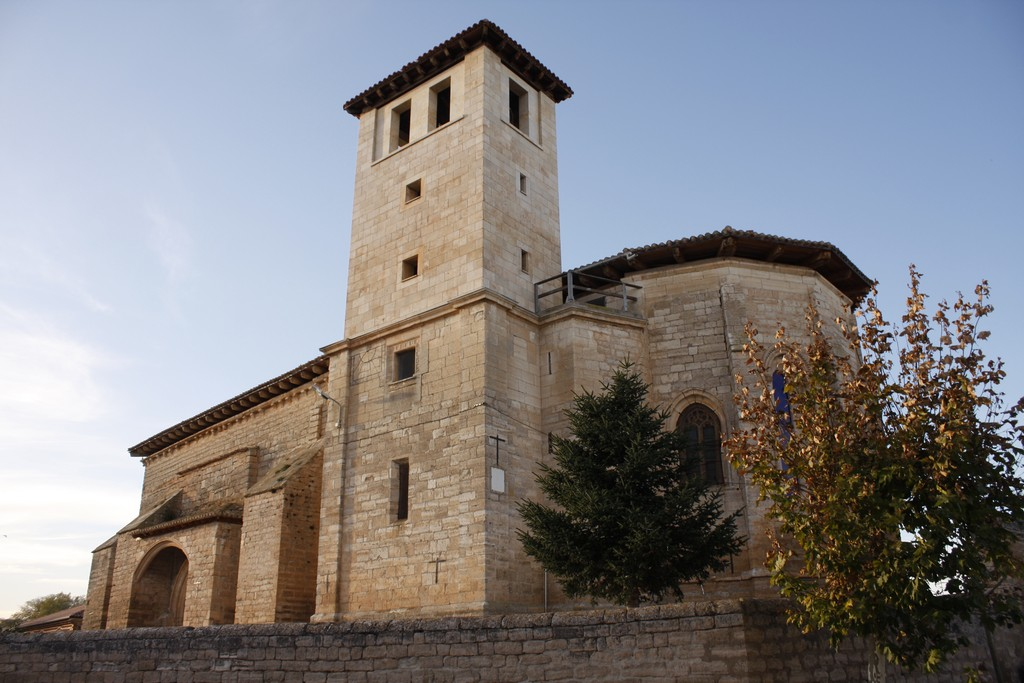
- Virgen de la Asunción church (13th-16th century)

- Flag Coat of arms
- Interactive map of Ciadoncha
- Country: Spain
- Autonomous community: Castile and León
- Province: Burgos
- Comarca: Arlanza

Area
  - Total: 15 km^{2} (5.8 sq mi)

Population (2025-01-01)
  - Total: 77
  - Density: 5.1/km^{2} (13/sq mi)
- Time zone: UTC+1 (CET)
  - Summer (DST): UTC+2 (CEST)
- Postal code: 09928
- Website: http://www.ciadoncha.es/

Ciadoncha is a municipality located in the province of Burgos, Castile and León, Spain. According to the 2004 census (INE), the municipality has a population of 99 inhabitants.
