= Madrigal del Monte =

Coordinates: 42°09′N 3°40′W

- Municipality
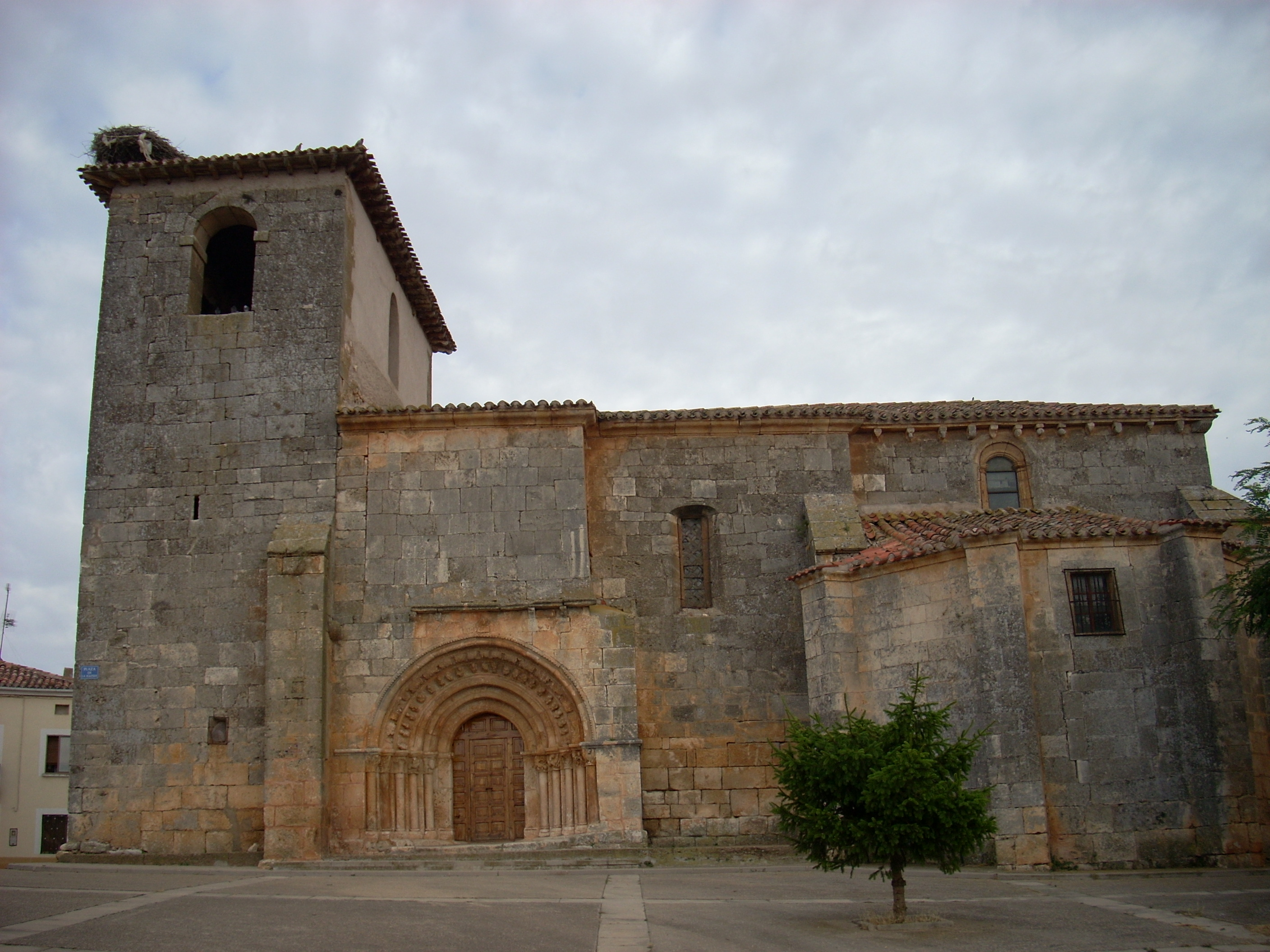
- San Andrés church

- Flag Coat of arms
- Interactive map of Madrigal del Monte
- Country: Spain
- Autonomous community: Castile and León
- Province: Burgos
- Comarca: Arlanza

Area
  - Total: 27 km^{2} (10 sq mi)
- Elevation: 935 m (3,068 ft)

Population (2025-01-01)
  - Total: 141
  - Density: 5.2/km^{2} (14/sq mi)
- Time zone: UTC+1 (CET)
  - Summer (DST): UTC+2 (CEST)
- Postal code: 09320
- Website: http://www.madrigaldelmonte.es/

Madrigal del Monte is a municipality located in the province of Burgos, Castile and León, Spain. According to the 2004 census (INE), the municipality has a population of 209 inhabitants.
