= Santa Inés, Castile and León =

Santa Inés
- Municipality and town
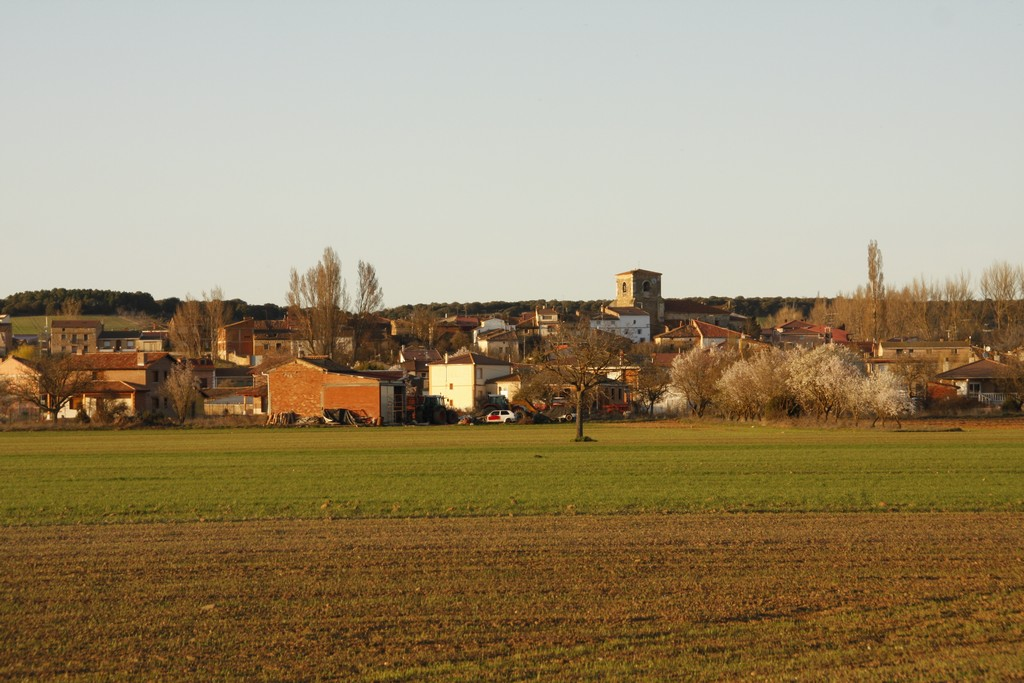
- View of Santa Inés, 2010

- Flag Coat of arms
- Interactive map of Santa Inés
- Coordinates: 42°02′21″N 3°42′13″W
- Country: Spain
- Autonomous community: Castile and León
- Province: Burgos
- Comarca: Arlanza

Government
  - Mayor: Ana María Sancho Barbero (PP)

Area
  - Total: 14.87 km^{2} (5.74 sq mi)

Population (2025-01-01)
  - Total: 153
- Postal code: 09390
- Website: http://www.santaines.es/

Santa Inés is a Spanish town and municipality in the province of Burgos, part of the autonomous community of Castile and León (Spain).
