= Quintanilla del Coco =

Coordinates: 41°59′N 3°31′W

- Municipality and town
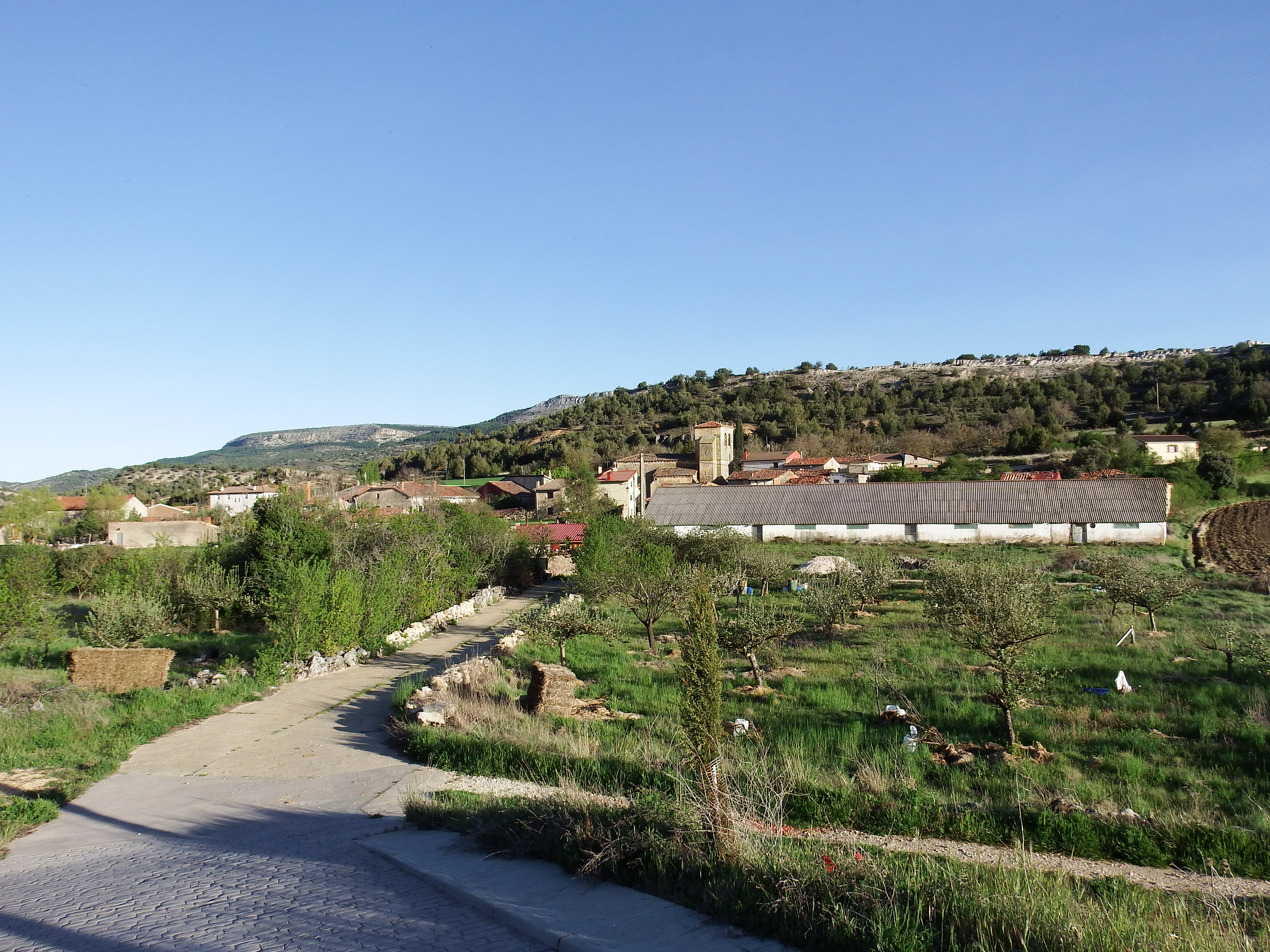
- View of Quintanilla del Coco
- Interactive map of Quintanilla del Coco
- Country: Spain
- Autonomous community: Castile and León
- Province: Burgos
- Comarca: Arlanza

Area
  - Total: 20.15 km^{2} (7.78 sq mi)
- Elevation: 947 m (3,107 ft)

Population (2025-01-01)
  - Total: 50
  - Density: 2.5/km^{2} (6.4/sq mi)
- Time zone: UTC+1 (CET)
  - Summer (DST): UTC+2 (CEST)
- Postal code: 09348
- Website: https://www.quintanilladelcoco.es/

Quintanilla del Coco is a municipality and town located in the province of Burgos, Castile and León, Spain. According to the 2015 census (INE), the municipality had a population of 10.
