= Madrigalejo del Monte =

Coordinates: 42°07′N 3°43′W

- Municipality
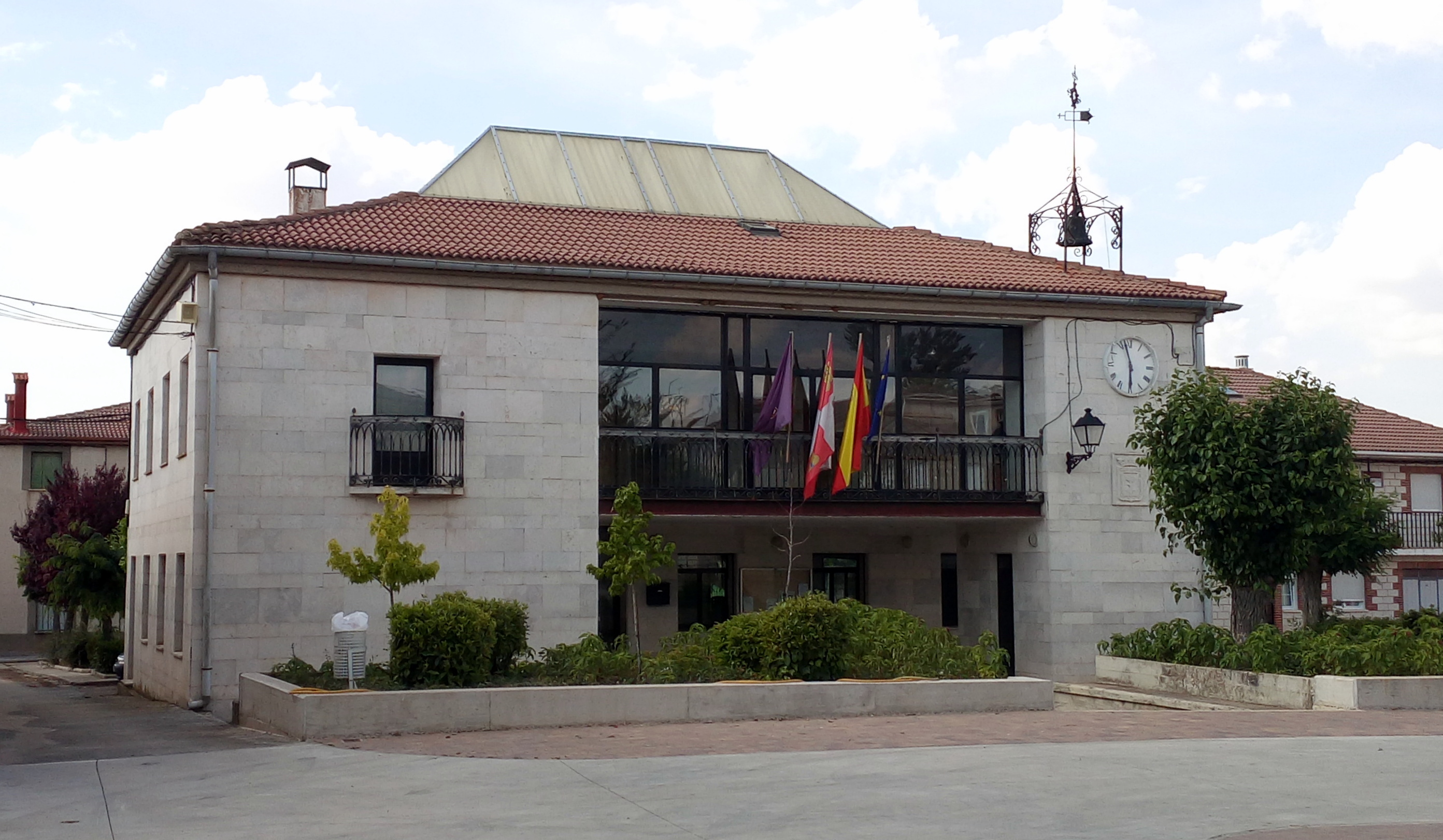
- Town Hall of Madrigalejo del Monte

- Coat of arms
- Interactive map of Madrigalejo del Monte
- Country: Spain
- Autonomous community: Castile and León
- Province: Burgos
- Comarca: Arlanza

Area
  - Total: 25 km^{2} (9.7 sq mi)
- Elevation: 890 m (2,920 ft)

Population (2025-01-01)
  - Total: 160
  - Density: 6.4/km^{2} (17/sq mi)
- Time zone: UTC+1 (CET)
  - Summer (DST): UTC+2 (CEST)
- Postal code: 09390
- Website: http://www.madrigalejodelmonte.es/

Madrigalejo del Monte is a municipality and town located in the province of Burgos, Castile and León, Spain. According to the 2022 census (INE), the municipality has a population of 183 inhabitants.
