= Ciruelos de Cervera =

Coordinates: 41°54′N 3°32′W

- Municipality
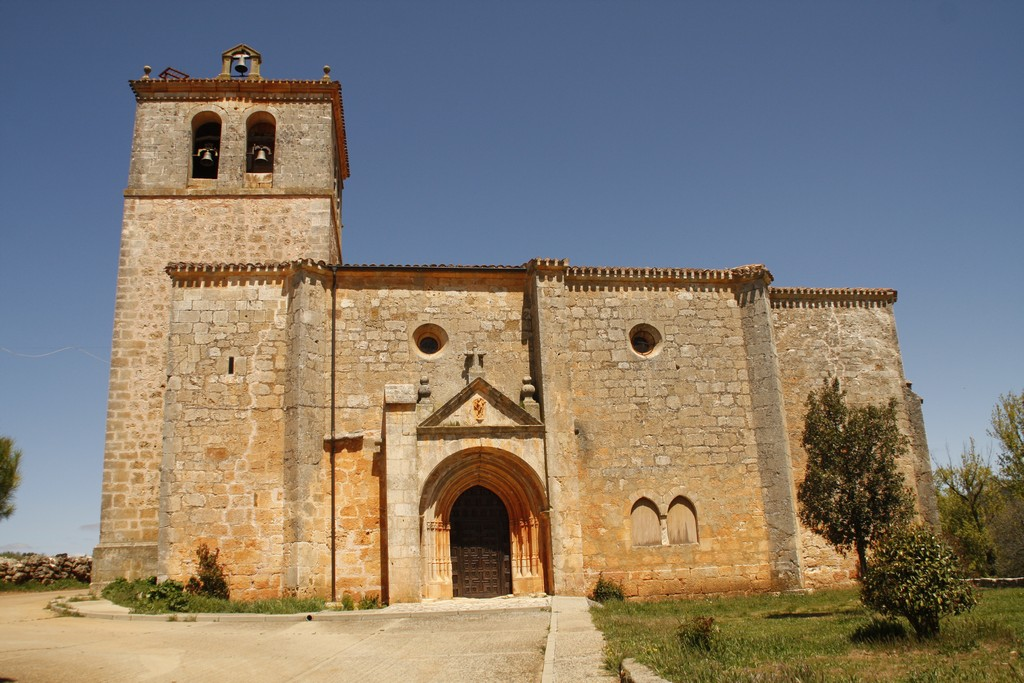
- San Sebastian church (15th century)

- Flag Coat of arms
- Interactive map of Ciruelos de Cervera
- Country: Spain
- Autonomous community: Castile and León
- Province: Burgos
- Comarca: Arlanza

Area
  - Total: 38 km^{2} (15 sq mi)
- Elevation: 1,025 m (3,363 ft)

Population (2025-01-01)
  - Total: 90
  - Density: 2.4/km^{2} (6.1/sq mi)
- Time zone: UTC+1 (CET)
  - Summer (DST): UTC+2 (CEST)

Ciruelos de Cervera is a municipality located in the province of Burgos, Castile and León, Spain.

According to the 2004 census (INE), the municipality has a population of 144 inhabitants.
