= Puentedura =

Coordinates: 42°02′N 3°35′W

- Municipality and town
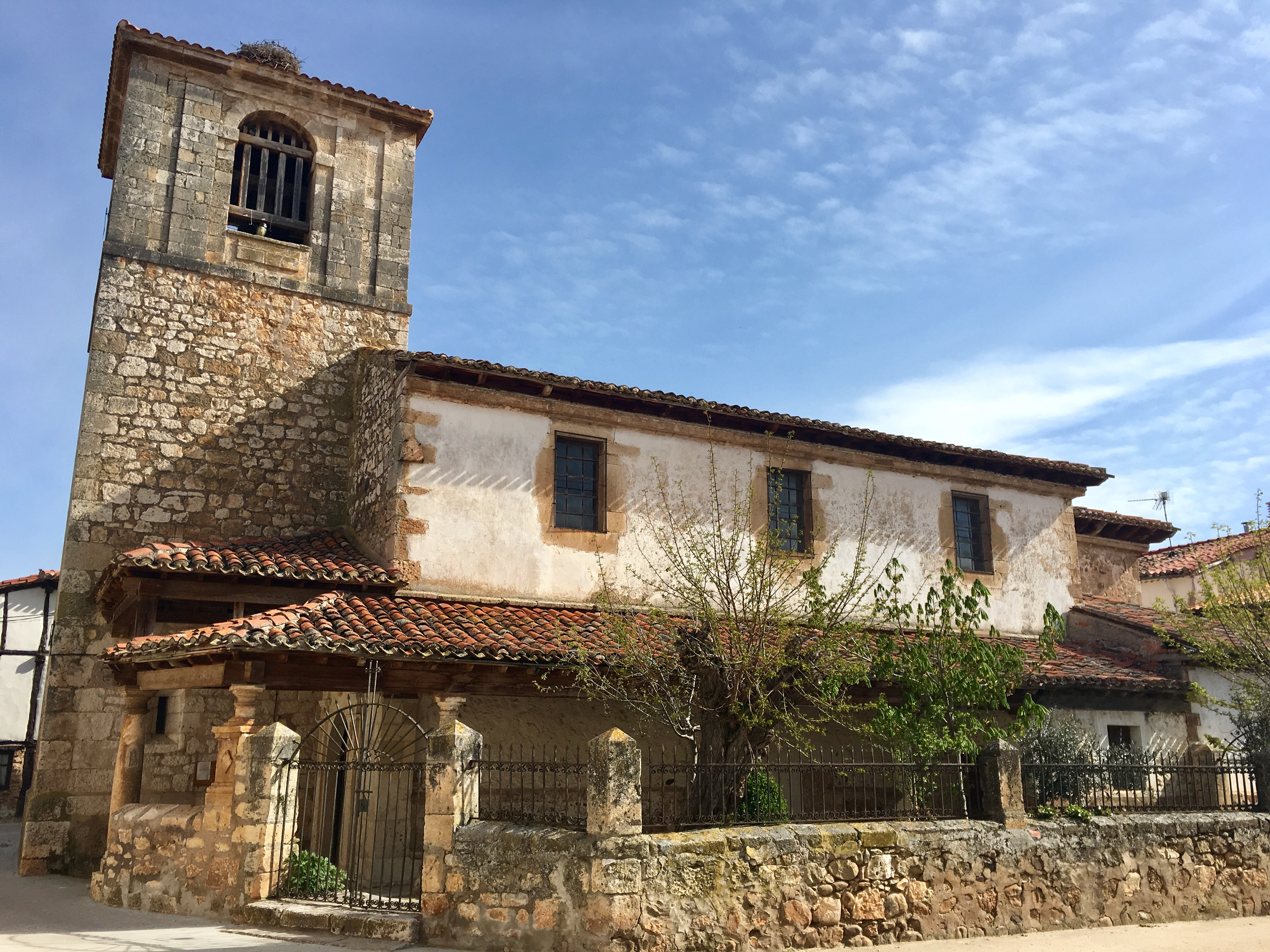

- Flag Coat of arms
- Interactive map of Puentedura
- Country: Spain
- Autonomous community: Castile and León
- Province: Burgos
- Comarca: Arlanza

Area
  - Total: 16 km^{2} (6.2 sq mi)
- Elevation: 860 m (2,820 ft)

Population (2025-01-01)
  - Total: 117
  - Density: 7.3/km^{2} (19/sq mi)
- Time zone: UTC+1 (CET)
  - Summer (DST): UTC+2 (CEST)
- Postal code: 09347
- Website: http://www.puentedura.es/

Puentedura is a municipality and town located in the province of Burgos, Castile and León, Spain. According to the 2004 census (INE), the municipality has a population of 119 inhabitants.
