= Cilleruelo de Arriba =

Coordinates: 41°54′N 3°39′W

- Municipality
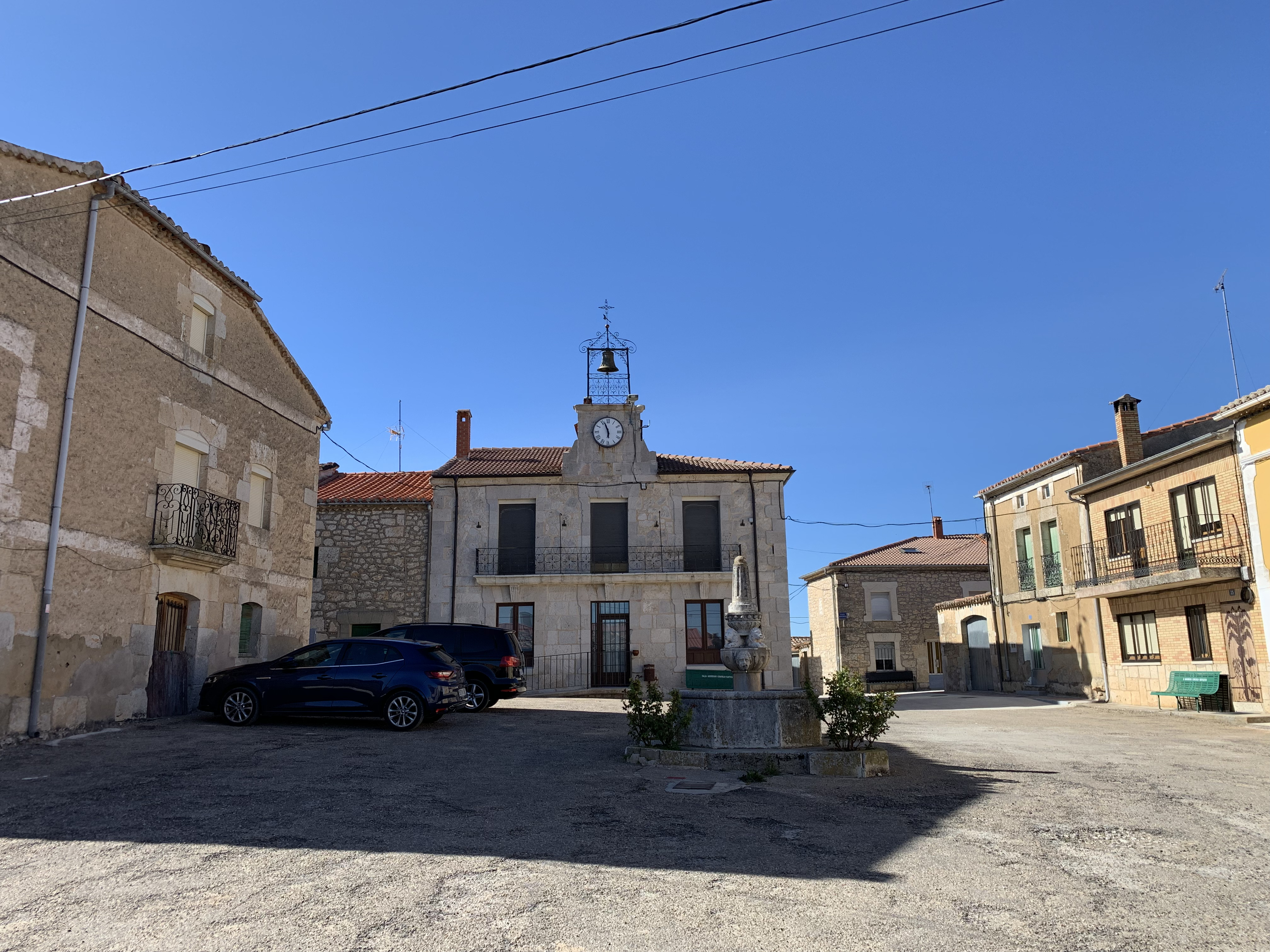
- Cilleruelo de Arriba Town Hall

- Flag Coat of arms
- Interactive map of Cilleruelo de Arriba
- Country: Spain
- Autonomous community: Castile and León
- Province: Burgos
- Comarca: Arlanza

Area
  - Total: 19 km^{2} (7.3 sq mi)
- Elevation: 967 m (3,173 ft)

Population (2025-01-01)
  - Total: 52
  - Density: 2.7/km^{2} (7.1/sq mi)
- Time zone: UTC+1 (CET)
  - Summer (DST): UTC+2 (CEST)
- Postal code: 09349
- Website: http://www.cilleruelodearriba.es/

Cilleruelo de Arriba is a municipality located in the province of Burgos, Castile and León, Spain. According to the 2004 census (INE), the municipality has a population of 72 inhabitants.
