= Fontioso =

Coordinates: 41°56′N 3°44′W

- Municipality
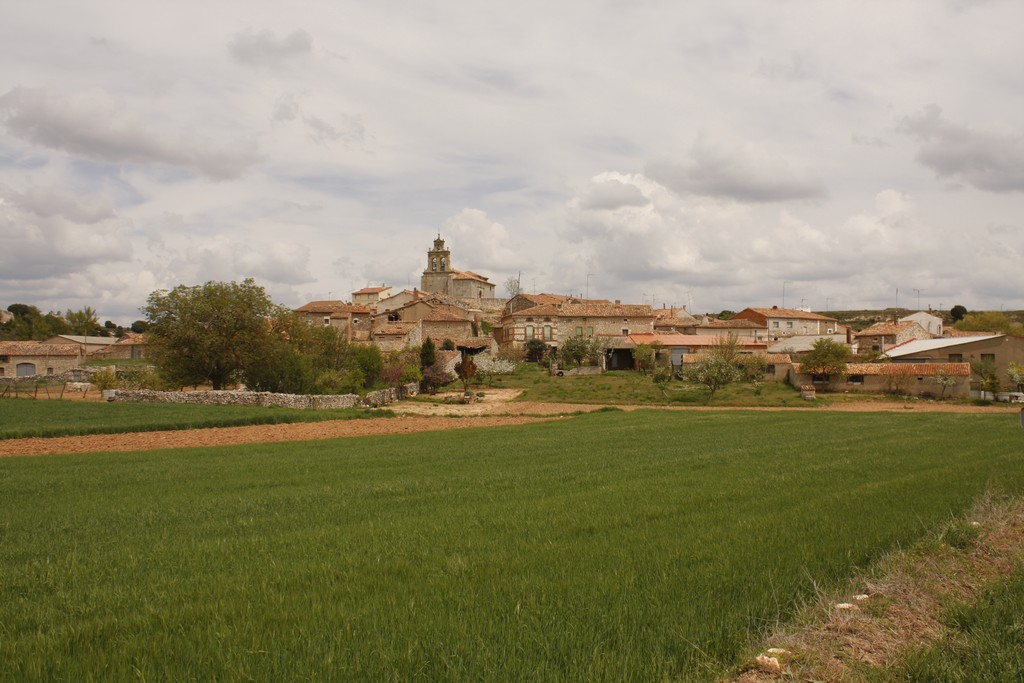
- View of Fontioso, 2010
- Interactive map of Fontioso
- Country: Spain
- Autonomous community: Castile and León
- Province: Burgos
- Comarca: Arlanza

Area
  - Total: 25 km^{2} (9.7 sq mi)
- Elevation: 967 m (3,173 ft)

Population (2025-01-01)
  - Total: 52
  - Density: 2.1/km^{2} (5.4/sq mi)
- Time zone: UTC+1 (CET)
  - Summer (DST): UTC+2 (CEST)
- Postal code: 09349
- Website: http://www.fontioso.es/

Fontioso is a municipality located in the province of Burgos, Castile and León, Spain. According to the 2004 census (INE), the municipality has a population of 67 inhabitants.
