= Quintanilla del Agua y Tordueles =

- Municipality
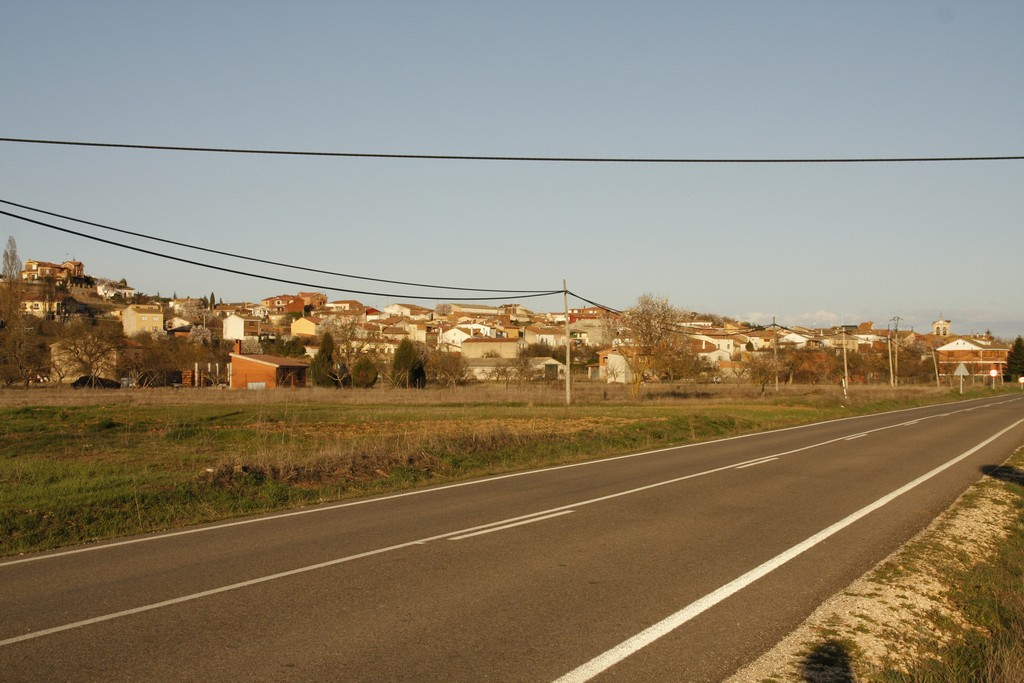
- View of Quintanilla del Agua, head of the municipality

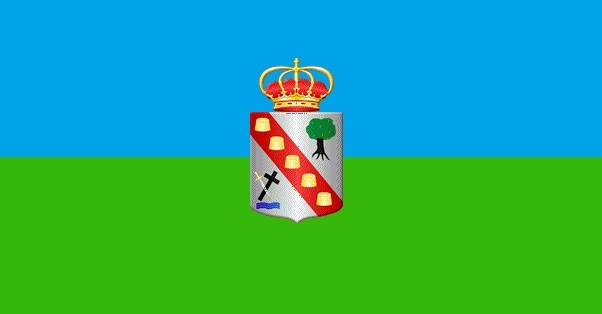
- Flag Coat of arms
- Interactive map of Quintanilla del Agua y Tordueles
- Coordinates: 42.0361°N 3.6506°W
- Country: Spain
- Autonomous community: Castile and León
- Province: Burgos
- Comarca: Arlanza
- Seat: Quintanilla del Agua

Area
  - Total: 35.79 km^{2} (13.82 sq mi)
- Elevation: 852 m (2,795 ft)

Population (2025-01-01)
  - Total: 336
  - Density: 9.39/km^{2} (24.3/sq mi)
- Time zone: UTC+1 (CET)
  - Summer (DST): UTC+2 (CEST)
- Postal code: 09347
- Website: http://www.quintanilladelaguaytordueles.es/

Quintanilla del Agua y Tordueles is a municipality located in the province of Burgos, Castile and León, Spain. According to the 2004 census (INE), the municipality has a population of 582 inhabitants. Its seat is in Quintanilla del Agua.
