= Royuela de Río Franco =

Coordinates: 42°00′N 3°57′W

- Municipality and town
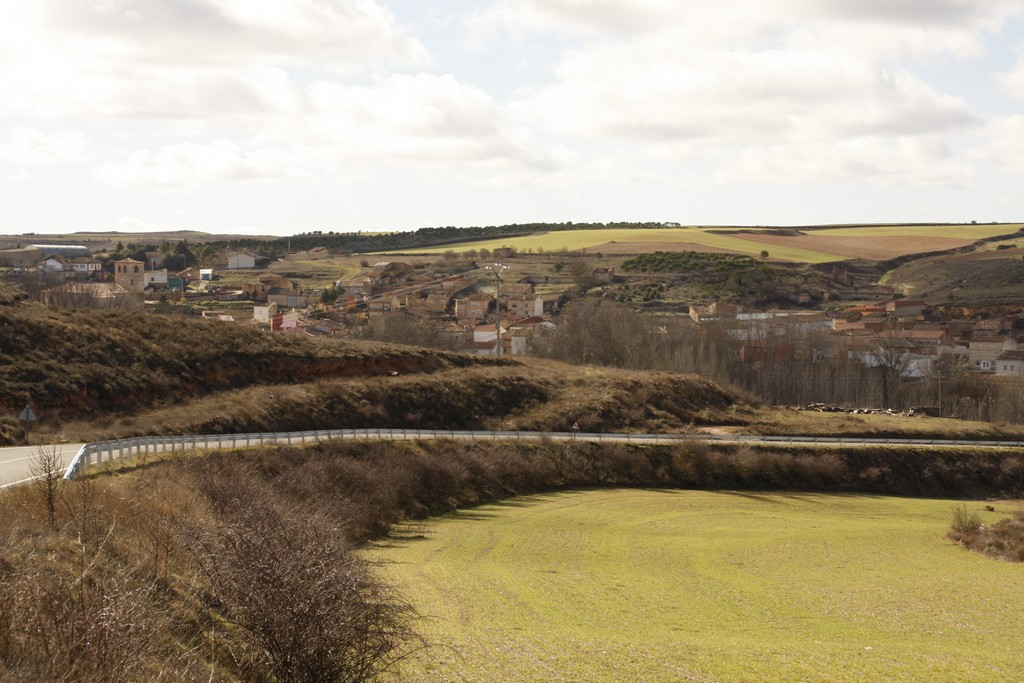
- View of Royuela de Río Franco, 2010

- Coat of arms
- Interactive map of Royuela de Río Franco
- Country: Spain
- Autonomous community: Castile and León
- Province: Burgos
- Comarca: Arlanza

Area
  - Total: 50.61 km^{2} (19.54 sq mi)
- Elevation: 845 m (2,772 ft)

Population (2025-01-01)
  - Total: 169
  - Density: 3.34/km^{2} (8.65/sq mi)
- Time zone: UTC+1 (CET)
  - Summer (DST): UTC+2 (CEST)
- Postal code: 09344
- Website: http://www.royuelariofranco.es/

Royuela de Río Franco is a municipality and town located in the province of Burgos, Castile and León, Spain. According to the 2004 census (INE), the municipality has a population of 289 inhabitants.
