= Avellanosa de Muñó =

- Municipality and town
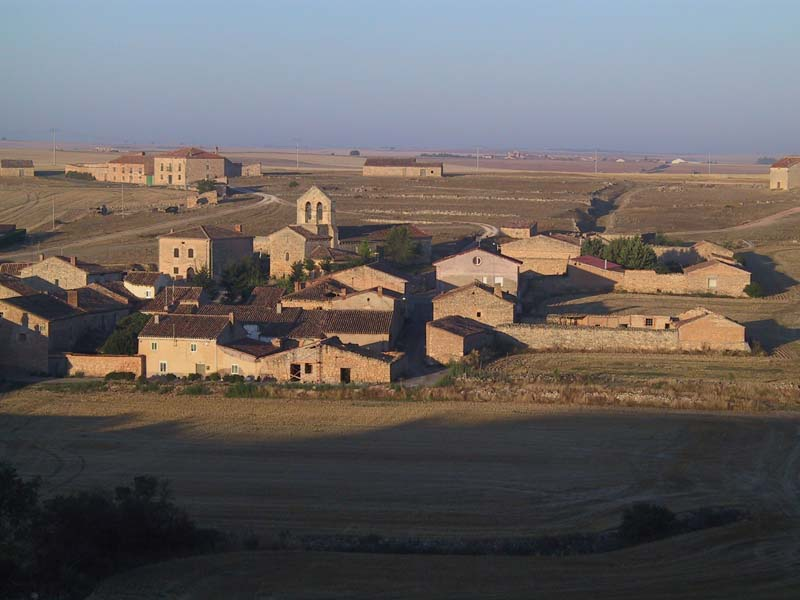
- View of Avellanosa de Muñó, 2006

- Flag Coat of arms

- Location within Castile and León Location within Spain
- Coordinates: 41°59′01″N 3°49′28″W
- Country: Spain
- Autonomous community: Castile and León
- Province: Burgos
- Comarca: Arlanza

Government
  - Mayor: Enrique Manuel Ortega García (Spanish Socialist Workers' Party)

Area
  - Total: 36.89 km^{2} (14.24 sq mi)
- Elevation: 877 m (2,877 ft)

Population (2025-01-01)
  - Total: 95
  - Density: 2.6/km^{2} (6.7/sq mi)
- Time zone: UTC+1 (CET)
  - Summer (DST): UTC+2 (CEST)
- Postal code: 09345
- Website: www.avellanosademuño.es

Avellanosa de Muñó is a municipality and town located in the province of Burgos, Castile and León, Spain. According to the 2013 census (INE), the municipality has a population of 122 inhabitants.

The municipality of Avellanosa de Muñó is made up of four towns: Avellanosa de Muñó (seat or capital), Paúles del Agua, Pinedillo and Torrecitores del Enebral.
