= Cebrecos =

Coordinates: 41°59′N 3°36′W

- Municipality
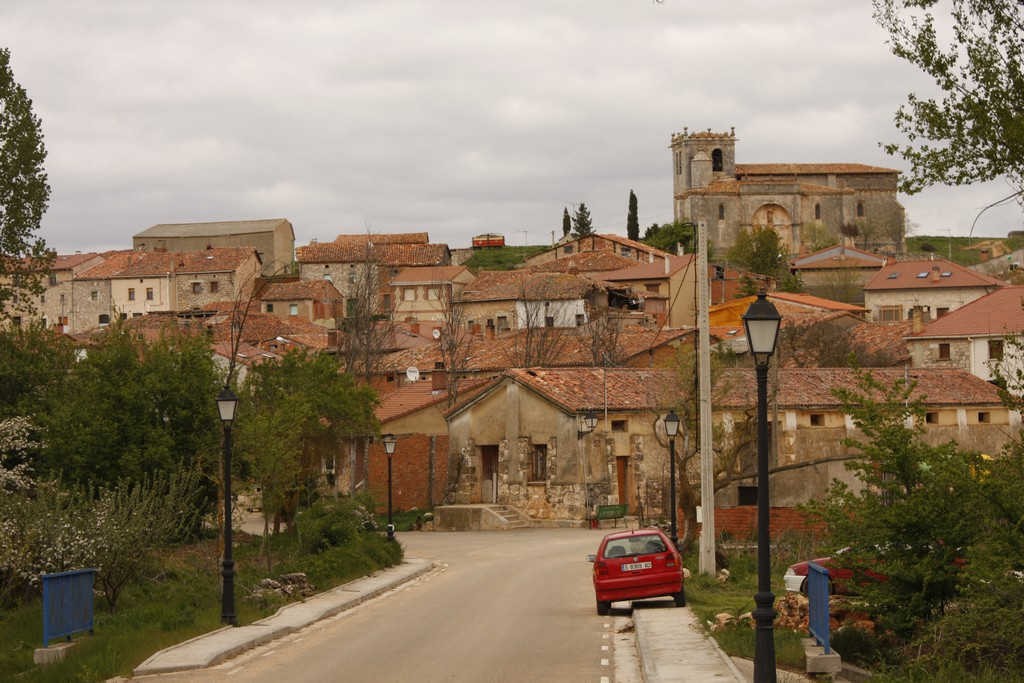
- View of Cebrecos,2010
- Interactive map of Cebrecos
- Country: Spain
- Autonomous community: Castile and León
- Province: Burgos
- Comarca: Arlanza

Area
  - Total: 23 km^{2} (8.9 sq mi)
- Elevation: 965 m (3,166 ft)

Population (2025-01-01)
  - Total: 60
  - Density: 2.6/km^{2} (6.8/sq mi)
- Time zone: UTC+1 (CET)
  - Summer (DST): UTC+2 (CEST)
- Postal code: 09348
- Website: http://www.cebrecos.es/

Cebrecos is a municipality located in the province of Burgos, Castile and León, Spain. According to the 2004 census (INE), the municipality has a population of 67 inhabitants.
