= Tejada, Province of Burgos =

Tejada
- Municipality and town
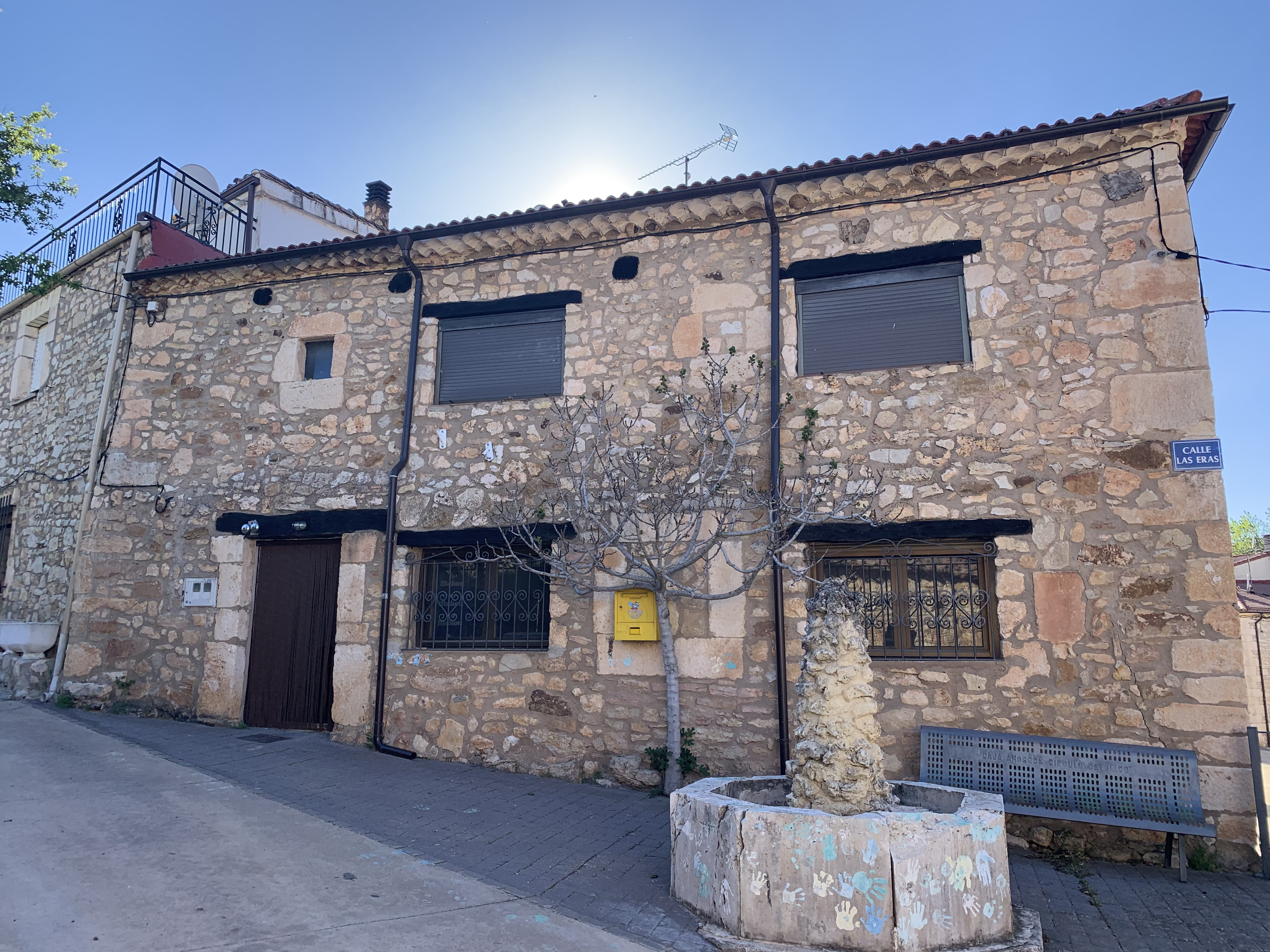
- Town Hall of Tejada

- Flag Coat of arms
- Interactive map of Tejada
- Coordinates: 41°57′08″N 3°32′10″W
- Country: Spain
- Autonomous community: Castile and León
- Province: Burgos
- Comarca: Arlanza

Area
  - Total: 22.7 km^{2} (8.8 sq mi)
- Elevation: 1,084 m (3,556 ft)

Population (2025-01-01)
  - Total: 35
  - Density: 1.5/km^{2} (4.0/sq mi)
- Time zone: UTC+1 (CET)
  - Summer (DST): UTC+2 (CEST)
- Postal code: 09348
- Website: http://www.tejada.es

Tejada is a municipality and town located in the province of Burgos, Castile and León, Spain.
