= Santibáñez del Val =

- Municipality and town
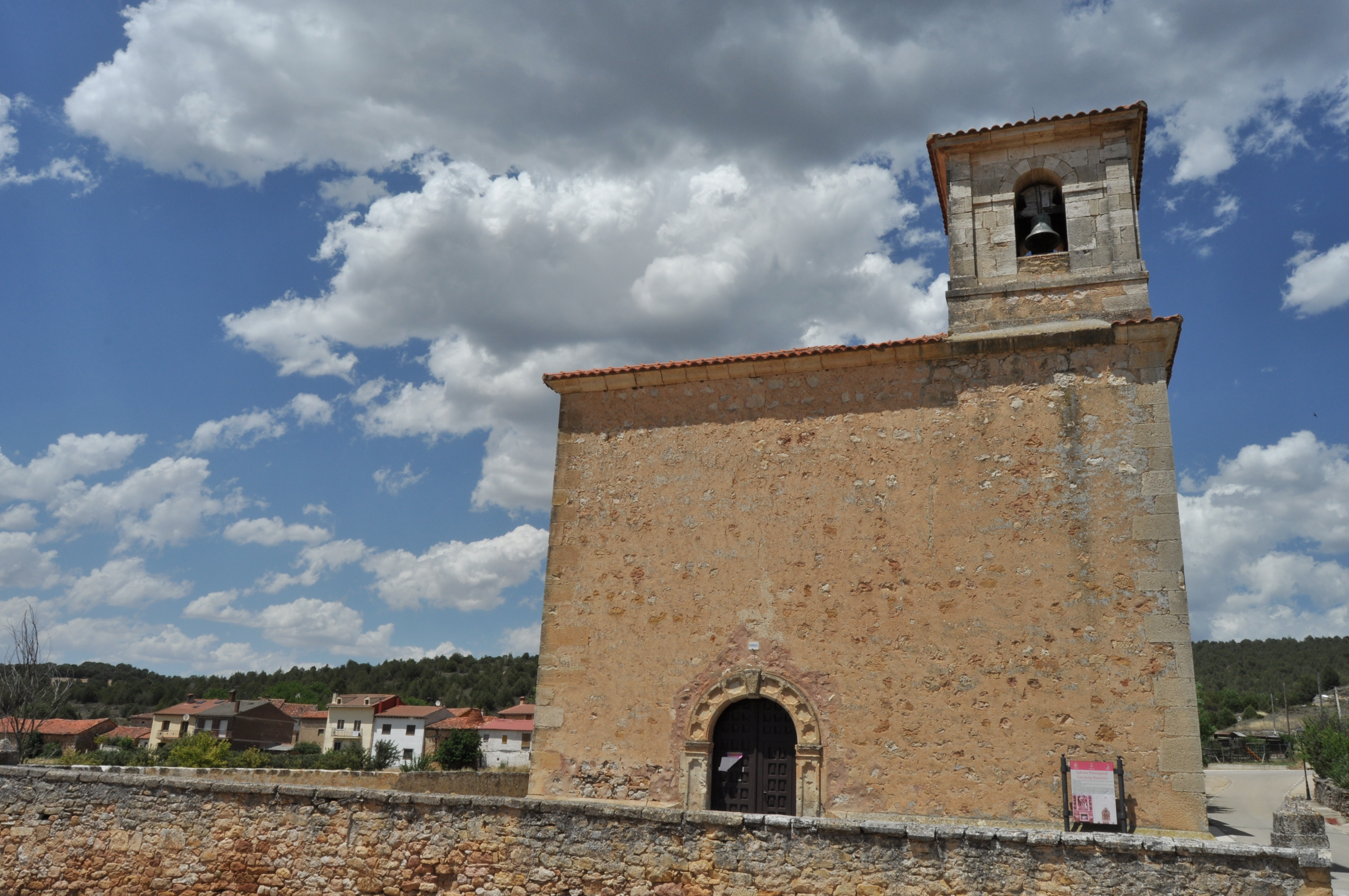
- View of Santibañez del Val

- Flag Coat of arms
- Interactive map of Santibáñez del Val
- Coordinates: 41°58′31″N 3°28′49″W
- Country: Spain
- Autonomous community: Castile and León
- Province: Burgos
- Comarca: Arlanza

Government
  - Mayor: Carlos Álamo Domingo

Area
  - Total: 14.96 km^{2} (5.78 sq mi)
- Elevation: 946 m (3,104 ft)

Population (2025-01-01)
  - Total: 64
  - Density: 4.3/km^{2} (11/sq mi)
- Time zone: UTC+1 (CET)
  - Summer (DST): UTC+2 (CEST)
- Postal code: 09617
- Website: http://www.santibañezdelval.es/

Santibáñez del Val is a municipality and town located in the province of Burgos, Castile and León, Spain.
