= Quintanilla de la Mata =

Coordinates: 41°59′N 3°46′W

- Municipality and town
- Interactive map of Quintanilla de la Mata
- Country: Spain
- Autonomous community: Castile and León
- Province: Burgos
- Comarca: Arlanza

Area
  - Total: 13.80 km^{2} (5.33 sq mi)
- Elevation: 888 m (2,913 ft)

Population (2025-01-01)
  - Total: 109
  - Density: 7.90/km^{2} (20.5/sq mi)
- Time zone: UTC+1 (CET)
  - Summer (DST): UTC+2 (CEST)
- Postal code: 09349
- Website: http://www.quintanilladelamata.es/

Quintanilla de la Mata is a municipality and town located in the province of Burgos, Castile and León, Spain. According to the 2004 census (INE), the municipality has a population of 157 inhabitants.

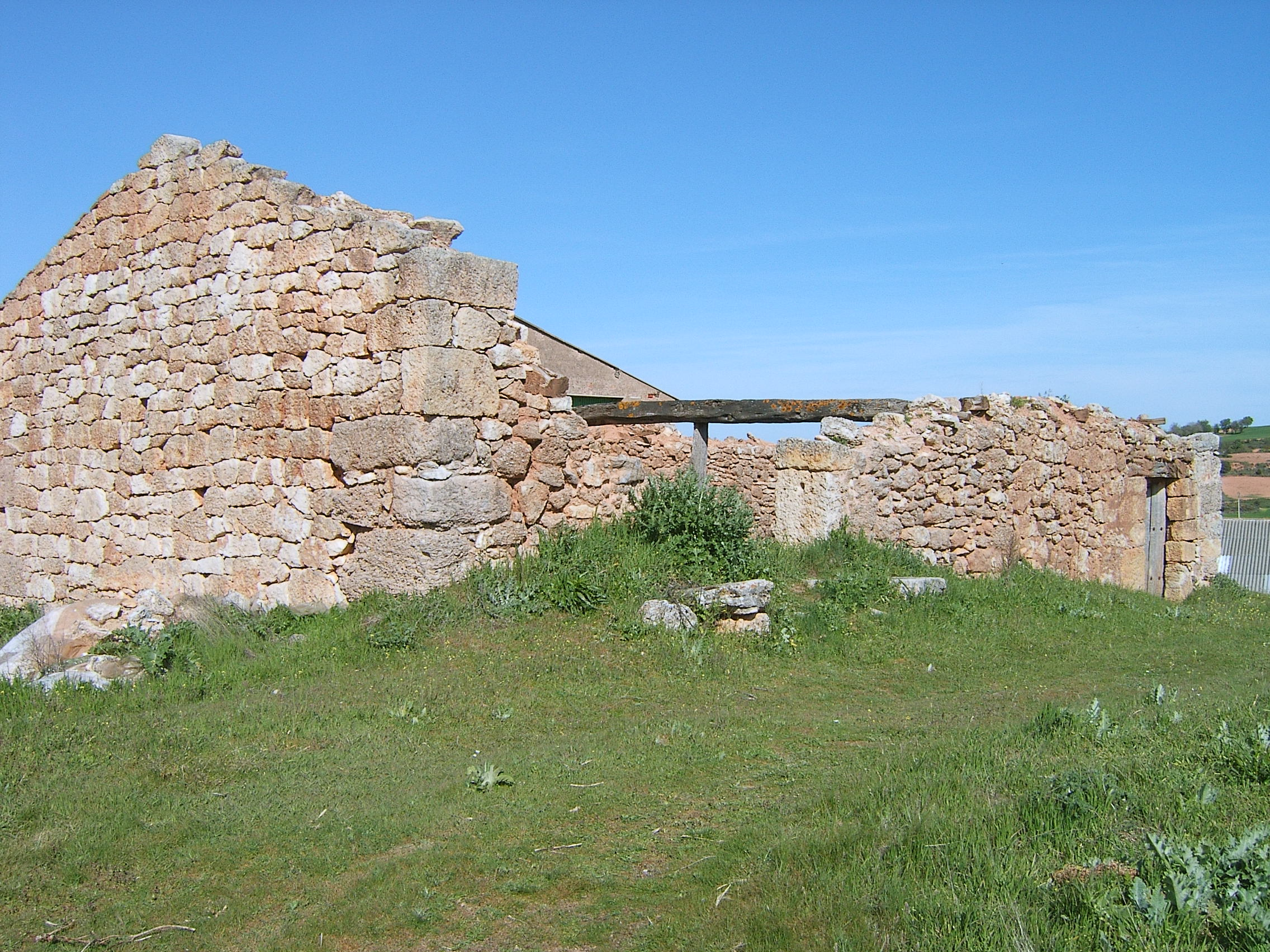
Lagar de Dios in Quintanilla de la Mata
