= Olmillos de Muñó =

Coordinates: 42°12′N 3°56′W

- Municipality and town
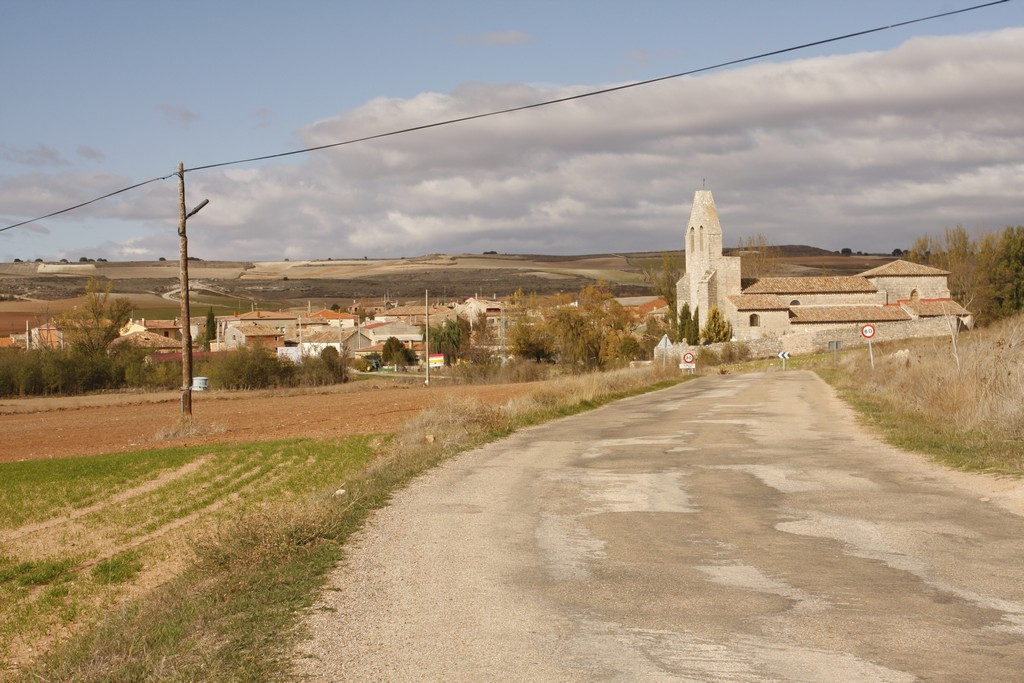
- View of Olmillos de Muñó, 2009

- Coat of arms
- Interactive map of Olmillos de Muñó
- Country: Spain
- Autonomous community: Castile and León
- Province: Burgos
- Comarca: Arlanza

Area
  - Total: 6 km^{2} (2.3 sq mi)
- Elevation: 810 m (2,660 ft)

Population (2025-01-01)
  - Total: 38
  - Density: 6.3/km^{2} (16/sq mi)
- Time zone: UTC+1 (CET)
  - Summer (DST): UTC+2 (CEST)
- Postal code: 09228
- Website: http://www.olmillosdemuño.es/

Olmillos de Muñó is a municipality and town located in the province of Burgos, Castile and León, Spain. According to the 2004 census (INE), the municipality has a population of 41 inhabitants.
