= Mahamud =

Coordinates: 42°07′N 3°56′W

- Municipality
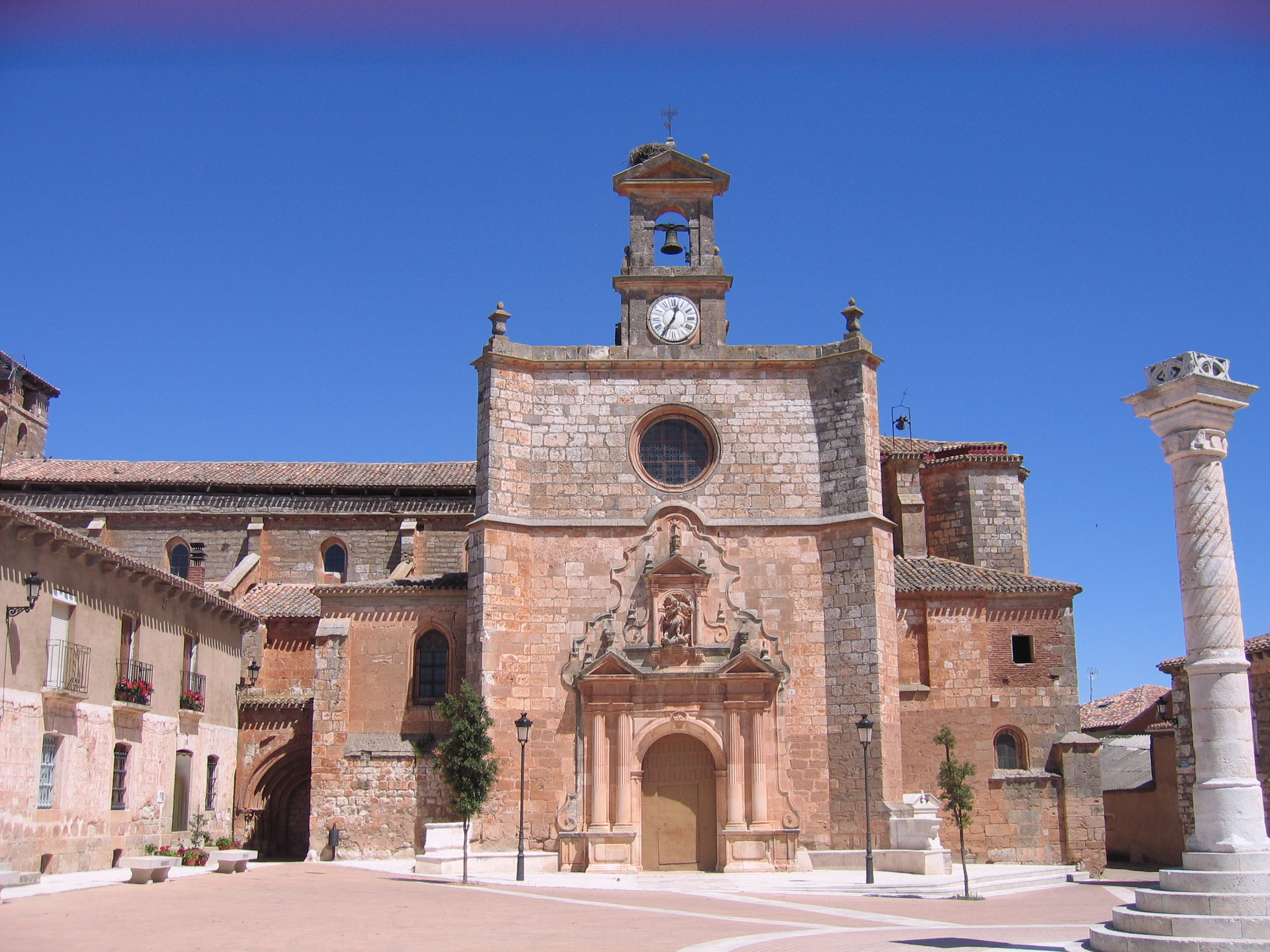
- San Miguel church (13th - 18th century)

- Flag Coat of arms
- Interactive map of Mahamud
- Country: Spain
- Autonomous community: Castile and León
- Province: Burgos
- Comarca: Arlanza

Area
  - Total: 33 km^{2} (13 sq mi)
- Elevation: 827 m (2,713 ft)

Population (2025-01-01)
  - Total: 107
  - Density: 3.2/km^{2} (8.4/sq mi)
- Time zone: UTC+1 (CET)
  - Summer (DST): UTC+2 (CEST)
- Postal code: 09228
- Website: http://www.mahamud.es/

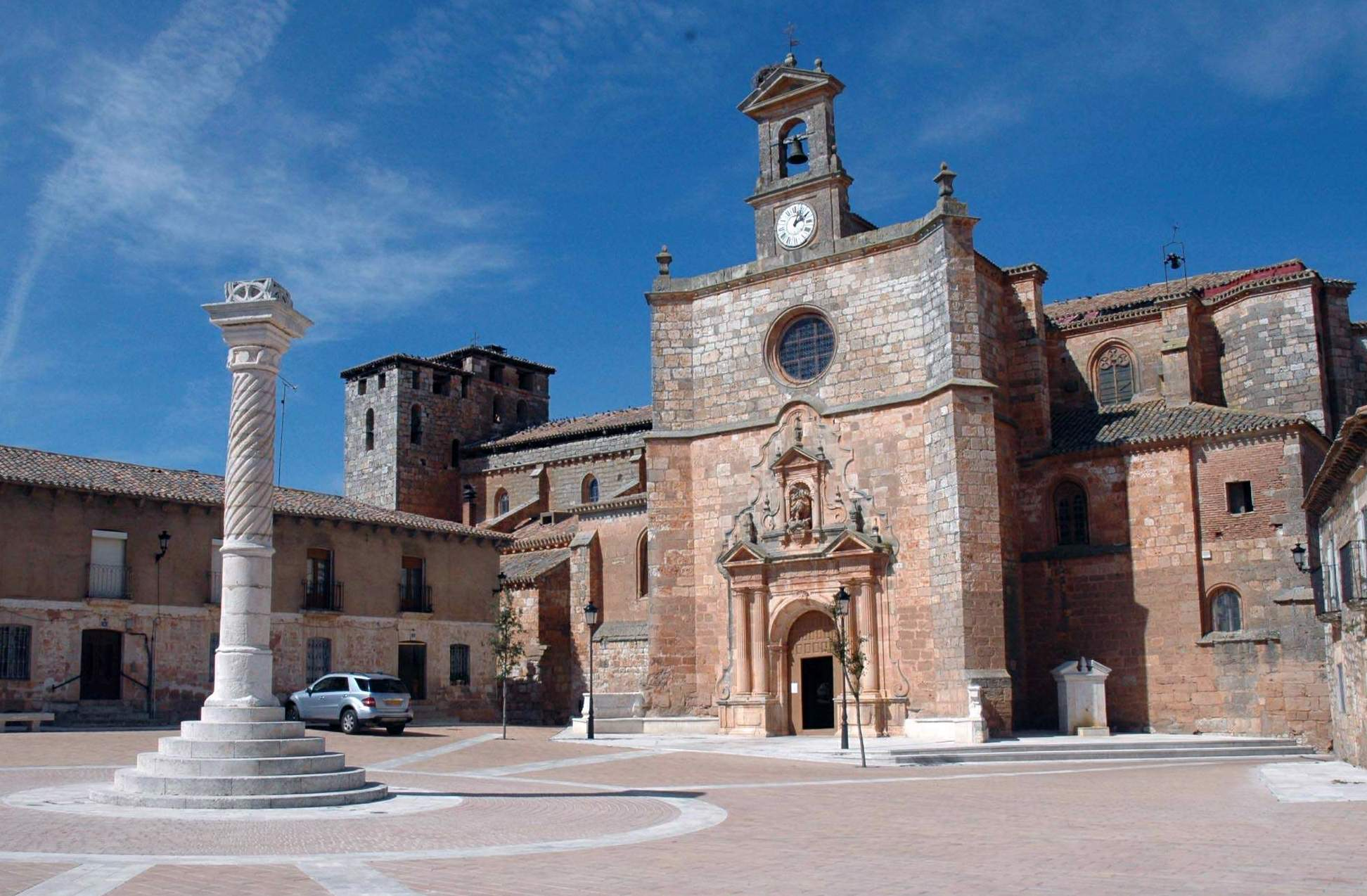
Church of San Miguel

Mahamud is a municipality and town located in the province of Burgos, Castile and León, Spain. According to the 2004 census (INE), the municipality has a population of 159 inhabitants. The toponym is of Arabic origin.
