= Hortigüela =

Coordinates: 42°04′N 3°25′W

- Municipality and town
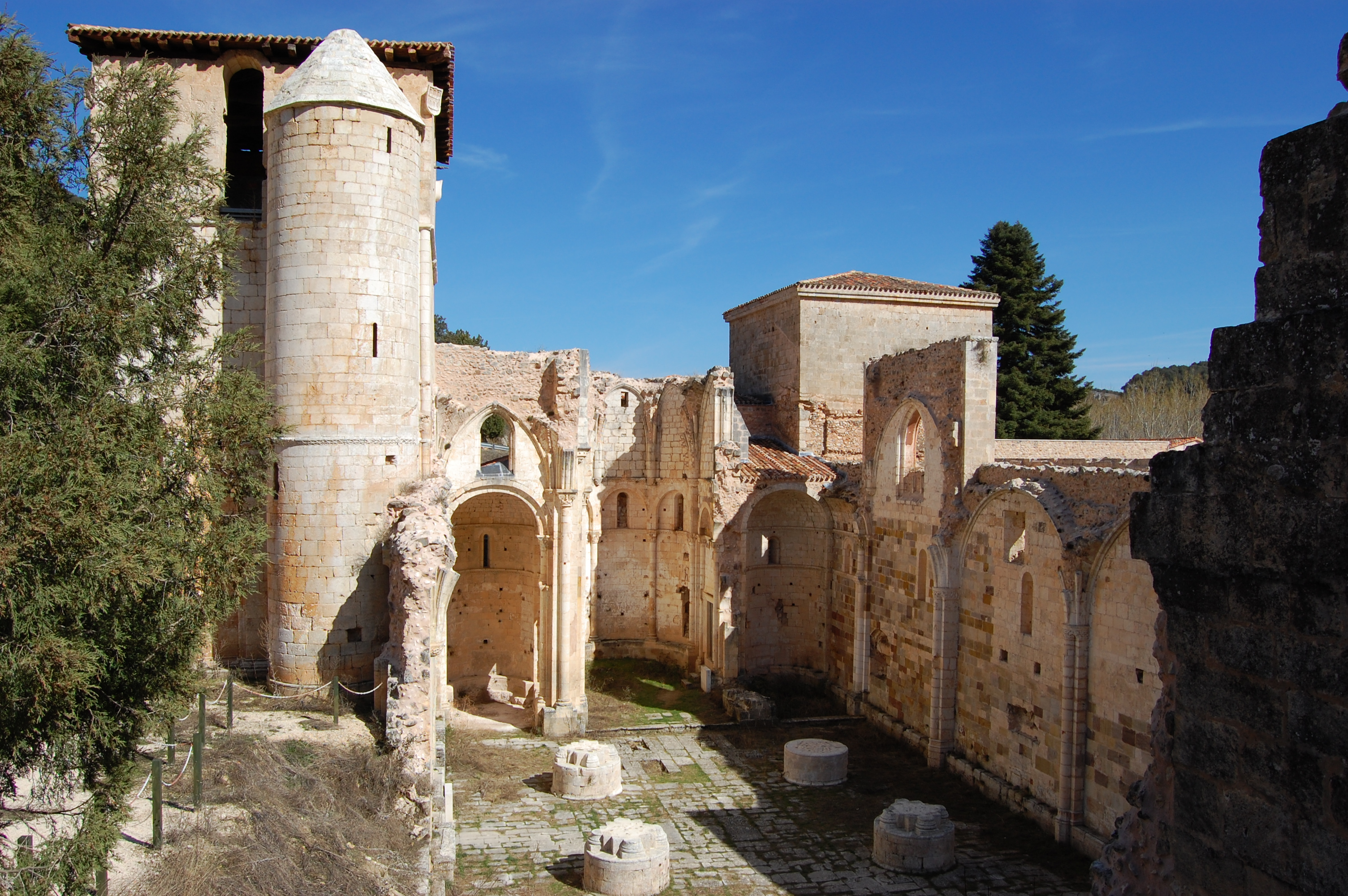
- Ruins of San Pedro de Arlanza monastery (10th century)

- Coat of arms
- Interactive map of Hortigüela
- Country: Spain
- Autonomous community: Castile and León
- Province: Burgos
- Comarca: Arlanza

Government
  - Mayor: Juan Martín Marcos (People's Party)

Area
  - Total: 21 km^{2} (8.1 sq mi)
- Elevation: 941 m (3,087 ft)

Population (2023)
  - Total: 107
  - Density: 5.1/km^{2} (13/sq mi)
- Time zone: UTC+1 (CET)
  - Summer (DST): UTC+2 (CEST)
- Postal code: 09640
- Website: http://www.hortiguela.es/

Hortigüela is a municipality located in the Province of Burgos, Castile and León, Spain. According to the 2023 Continuous Register (INE), the municipality has a population of 107 inhabitants.

== Main sights ==
- Ruins of the 10th-century Benedictine Monastery of San Pedro de Arlanza.
- Fuente Azul, an upwelling which has the deepest sump in Spain (-135 m.)
