= Cuevas de San Clemente =

Coordinates: 42°08′N 3°34′W

- Municipality
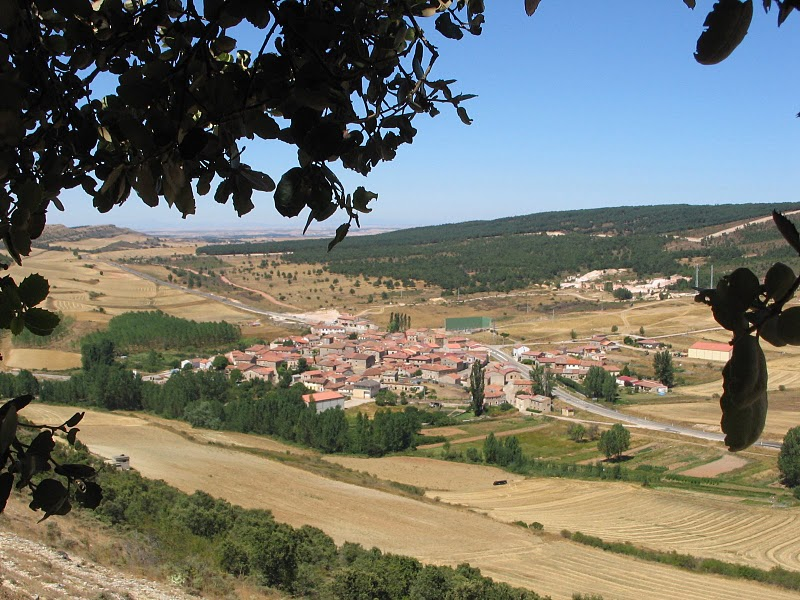
- Panoramic view of Cuevas de San Clemente
- Interactive map of Cuevas de San Clemente
- Country: Spain
- Autonomous community: Castile and León
- Province: Burgos
- Comarca: Arlanza

Area
  - Total: 13 km^{2} (5.0 sq mi)

Population (2025-01-01)
  - Total: 52
  - Density: 4.0/km^{2} (10/sq mi)
- Time zone: UTC+1 (CET)
  - Summer (DST): UTC+2 (CEST)
- Postal code: 09641
- Website: http://www.cuevasdesanclemente.es/

Cuevas de San Clemente is a municipality located in the province of Burgos, Castile and León, Spain. According to the 2004 census (INE), the municipality has a population of 59 inhabitants.
