= Nebreda =

Coordinates: 41°58′N 3°38′W

- Municipality
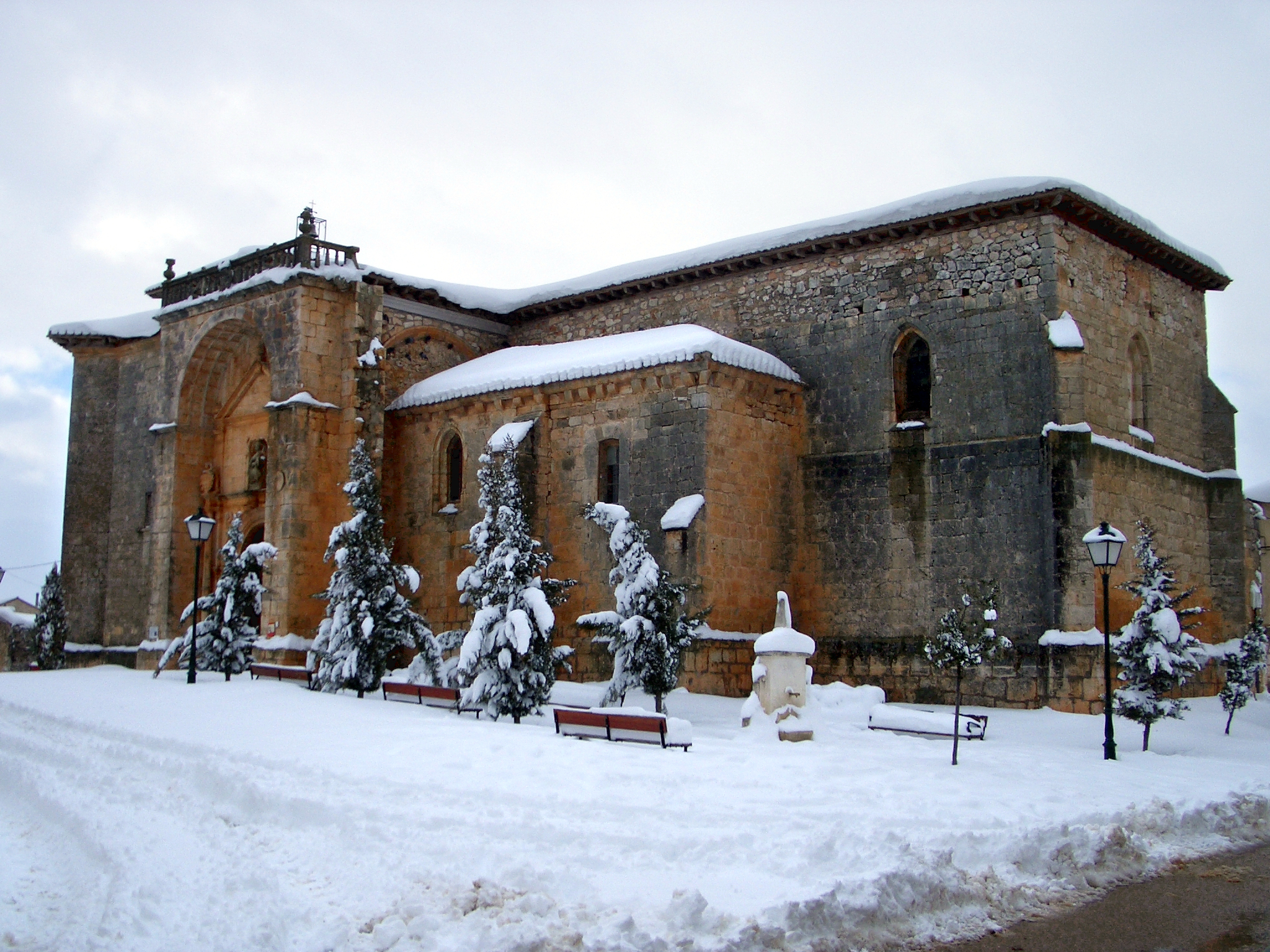
- Nativity church (15th-16th century)

- Flag Coat of arms
- Interactive map of Nebreda
- Country: Spain
- Autonomous community: Castile and León
- Province: Burgos
- Comarca: Arlanza

Government

Area
  - Total: 28 km^{2} (11 sq mi)
- Elevation: 915 m (3,002 ft)

Population (2025-01-01)
  - Total: 50
  - Density: 1.8/km^{2} (4.6/sq mi)
- Time zone: UTC+1 (CET)
  - Summer (DST): UTC+2 (CEST)
- Postal code: 09348
- Website: http://www.nebreda.es/

Nebreda is a municipality and town located in the province of Burgos, Castile and León, Spain. According to the 2004 census (INE), the municipality has a population of 95 inhabitants.
