= Solarana =

Coordinates: 41°58′N 3°39′W

- Municipality and town
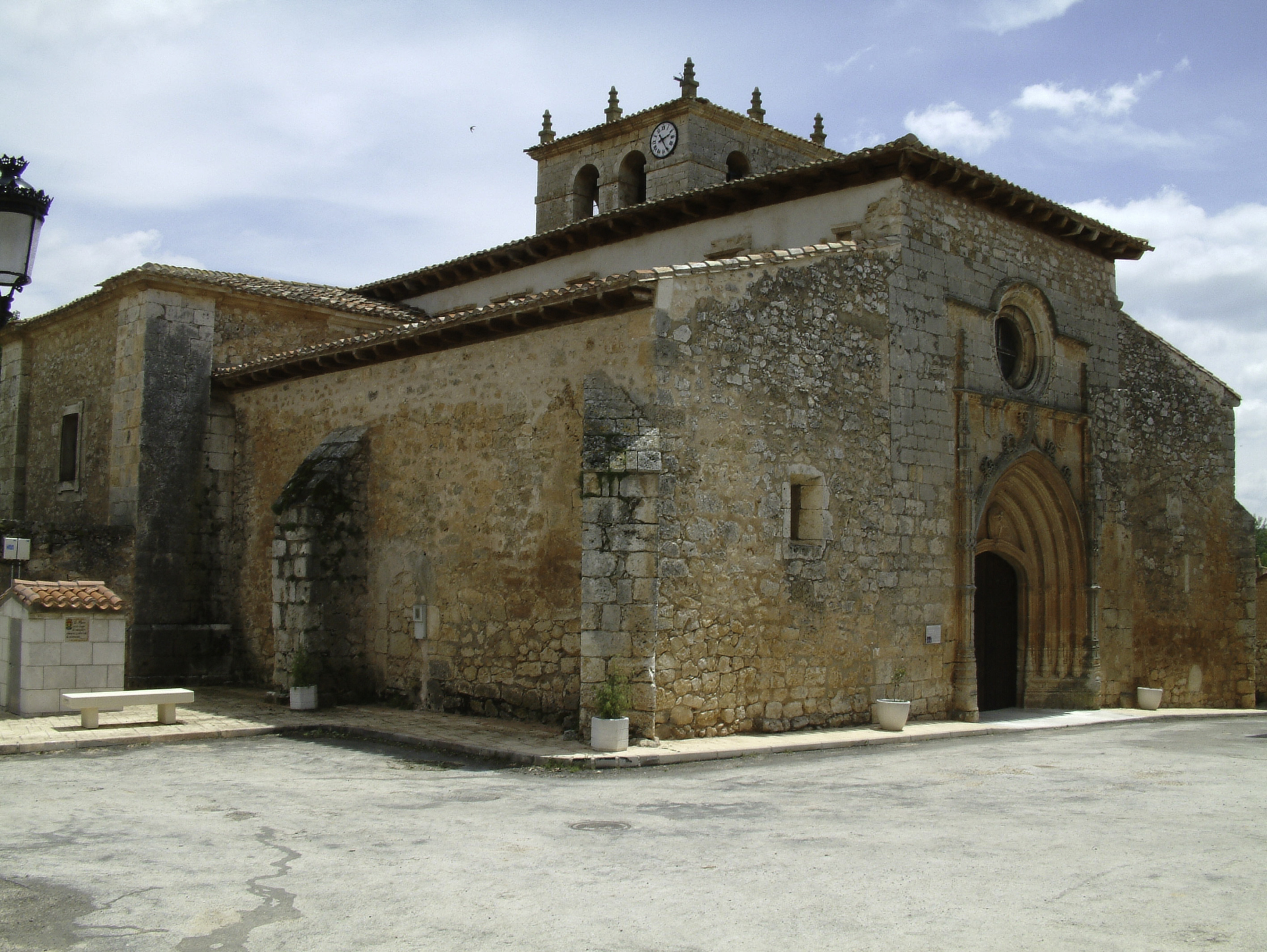

- Flag Coat of arms
- Interactive map of Solarana
- Country: Spain
- Autonomous community: Castile and León
- Province: Burgos
- Comarca: Arlanza

Area
  - Total: 14 km^{2} (5.4 sq mi)

Population (2025-01-01)
  - Total: 73
  - Density: 5.2/km^{2} (14/sq mi)
- Time zone: UTC+1 (CET)
  - Summer (DST): UTC+2 (CEST)
- Postal code: 09348
- Website: http://www.solarana.es/

Solarana is a municipality and town located in the province of Burgos, Castile and León, Spain. According to the 2022 census (INE), the municipality has a population of 80 inhabitants.
