= Villafruela =

- Municipality
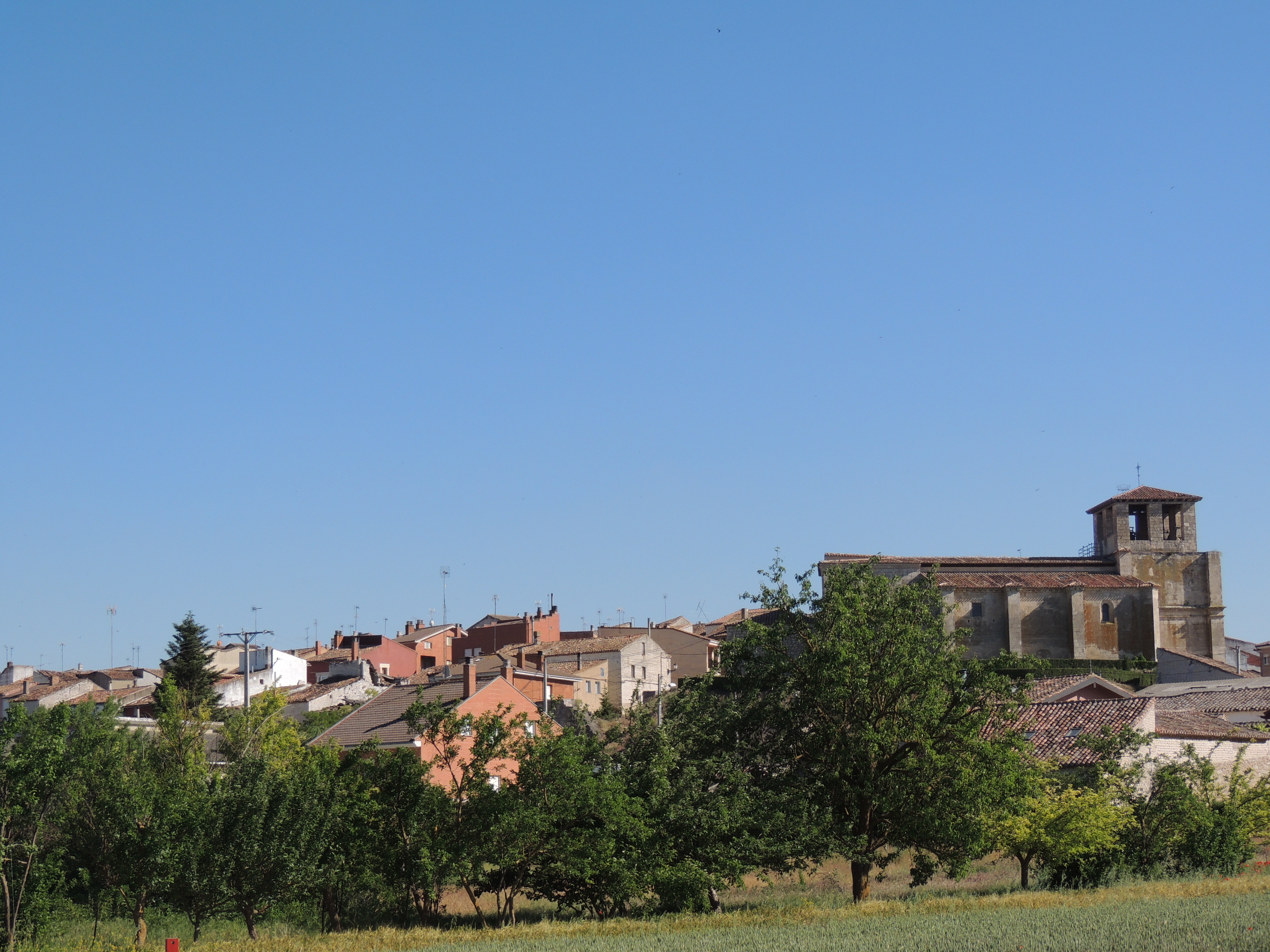
- View of Villafruela

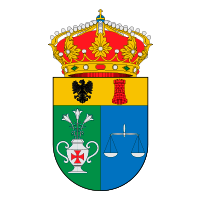
- Coat of arms

- Location within Castile and León Location within Spain
- Coordinates: 41°55′02″N 3°54′44″W
- Country: Spain
- Autonomous community: Castile and León
- Province: Burgos

Area
  - Total: 52 km^{2} (20 sq mi)

Population (2022)
  - Total: 154
  - Density: 3.0/km^{2} (7.7/sq mi)
- Time zone: UTC+1 (CET)
  - Summer (DST): UTC+2 (CEST)
- Website: www.villafruela.es

Villafruela is a municipality in the province of Burgos, Castile and León, Spain. It lies in the Arlanza area and belongs to the judicial district of Lerma. According to the INE, the municipality had a population of 154 in 2022.

== Geography ==
Villafruela is located 56 km from the city of Burgos and has an area of 52 km². The municipality forms part of the mancomunidad Ribera del Arlanza y del Monte.

== History ==
Villafruela has been discussed in scholarship on the medieval planned towns of Castile and León. José Luis Sáinz Guerra cites the settlement as an example whose street layout and church orientation reflect adaptation to the terrain rather than a uniform urban plan.

Historical census data published by the INE show long-term demographic decline, from 1,028 inhabitants in 1950 to 169 in 2021.

In 2017 Villafruela was recognized by the Junta de Castilla y León for its environmental management project after receiving first prize in the Fuentes Claras awards in the category for local entities with fewer than 1,000 inhabitants.

== Demographics ==
Like many rural municipalities in inland Spain, Villafruela has experienced long-term population decline.

== Heritage ==
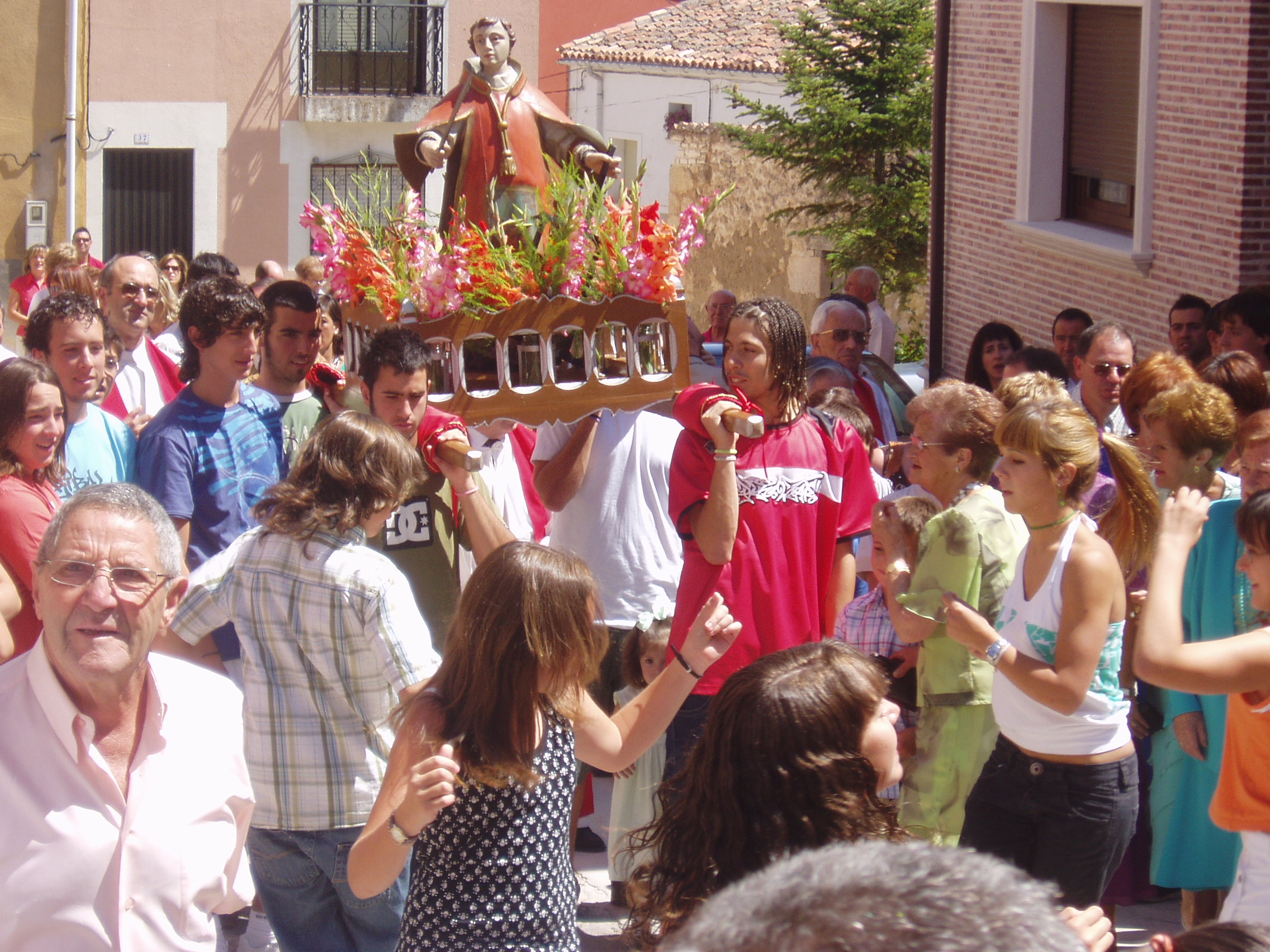
Procesion of San Lorenzo, patron saint of Villafruela, during the annual town's celebration.

Among the principal landmarks of the town are the church of San Lorenzo, the remains of the archbishop's palace, and the Ermita de la Veracruz.

The church of San Lorenzo is described by local sources as a late-Gothic building. Its main altarpiece dates to about 1530–1540.

== Culture ==
In the early 2000s, Villafruela hosted Páramo Rock, a free summer rock festival.

== Notable people ==
- Gabino Ramos (1948–2020), a philologist and co-author of the Diccionario del español actual, was born in Villafruela.
