= Peral de Arlanza =

Coordinates: 42°05′N 4°04′W

- Municipality and town
- Coat of arms
- Interactive map of Peral de Arlanza
- Country: Spain
- Autonomous community: Castile and León
- Province: Burgos
- Comarca: Arlanza

Area
  - Total: 28 km^{2} (11 sq mi)
- Elevation: 772 m (2,533 ft)

Population (2025-01-01)
  - Total: 169
  - Density: 6.0/km^{2} (16/sq mi)
- Time zone: UTC+1 (CET)
  - Summer (DST): UTC+2 (CEST)
- Postal code: 09342
- Website: http://www.peraldearlanza.es/

Peral de Arlanza is a municipality and town located in the province of Burgos, Castile and León, Spain. According to the 2004 census (INE), the municipality has a population of 223 inhabitants.

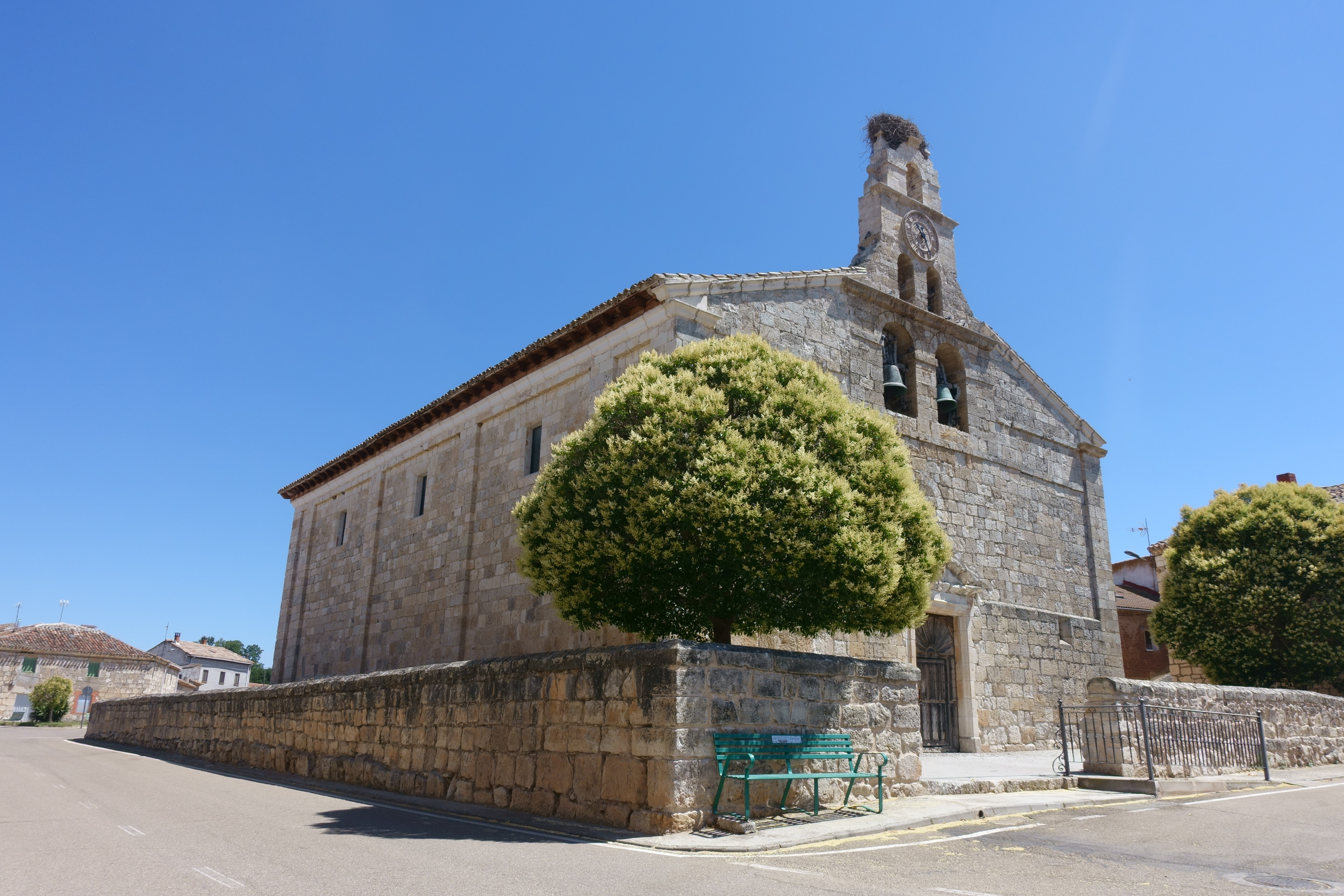
Church of San Juan Bautista in Peral de Arlanza
