= Torrepadre =

Coordinates: 42°03′N 3°56′W

- Municipality and town
- Coat of arms
- Interactive map of Torrepadre
- Country: Spain
- Autonomous community: Castile and León
- Province: Burgos
- Comarca: Ribera del Duero
- Founded: 900–910

Area
  - Total: 28 km^{2} (11 sq mi)
- Elevation: 801 m (2,628 ft)

Population (2025-01-01)
  - Total: 68
  - Density: 2.4/km^{2} (6.3/sq mi)
- Time zone: UTC+1 (CET)
  - Summer (DST): UTC+2 (CEST)
- Postal code: 09345
- Website: http://www.torrepadre.es/

Torrepadre is a municipality and town located in the province of Burgos, Castile and León, Spain. According to the 2004 census (INE), the municipality has a population of 95 inhabitants.

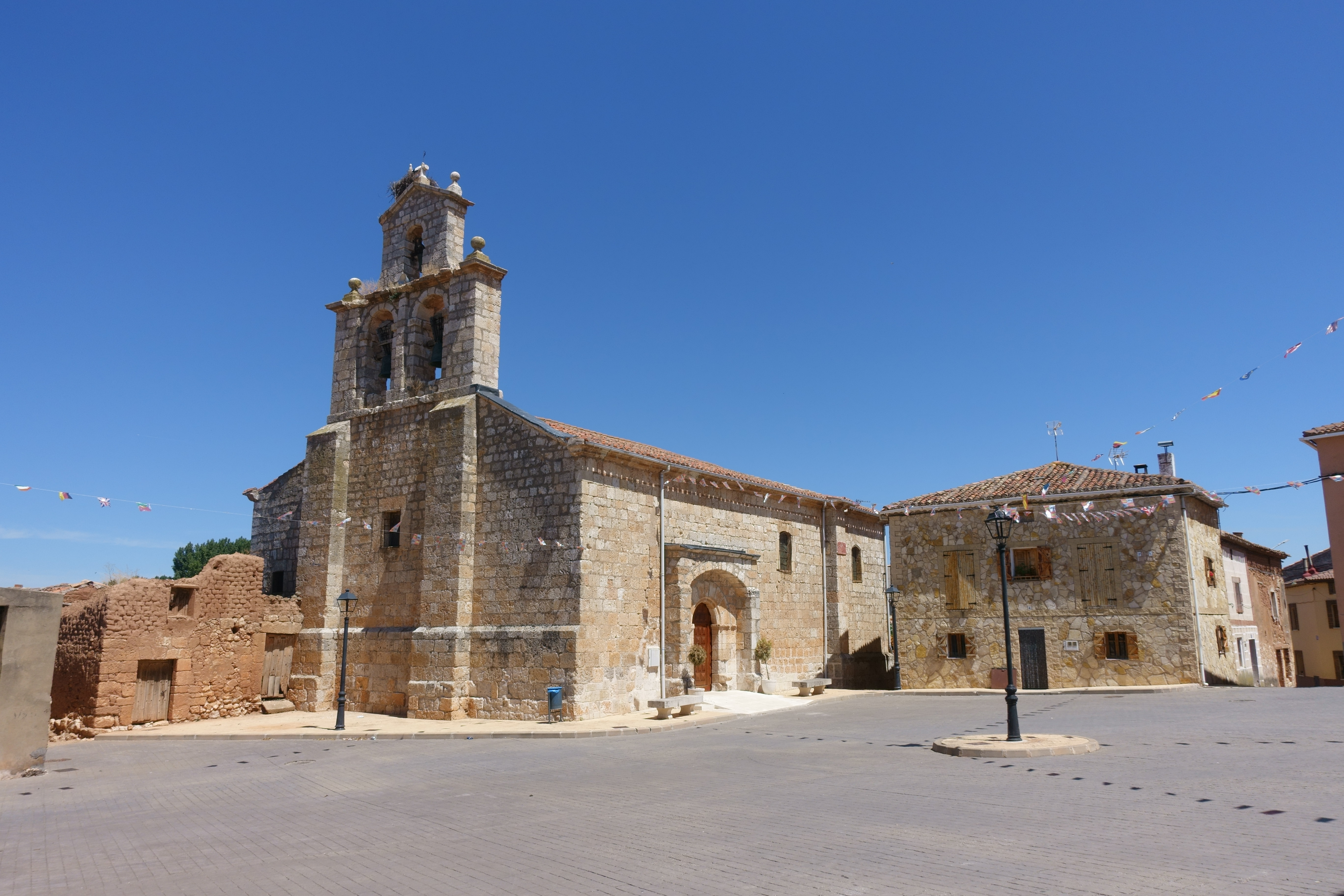
Church of San Esteban Protomartir in Torrepadre, Burgos, Spain
