= Zael, Province of Burgos =

Coordinates: 42°06′00″N 003°49′00″W

Zael
- municipality
- Coat of arms
- Interactive map of Zael
- Country: Spain
- Autonomous community: Castile and León
- Province: Burgos

Area
  - Total: 37 km^{2} (14 sq mi)

Population (2025-01-01)
  - Total: 117
  - Density: 3.2/km^{2} (8.2/sq mi)
- Time zone: UTC+1 (CET)
  - Summer (DST): UTC+2 (CEST)

Zael is a municipality in the province of Burgos, Castile and León, Spain.
