= Villalmanzo =

Village in Burgos, Spain

Villalmanzo, Spain
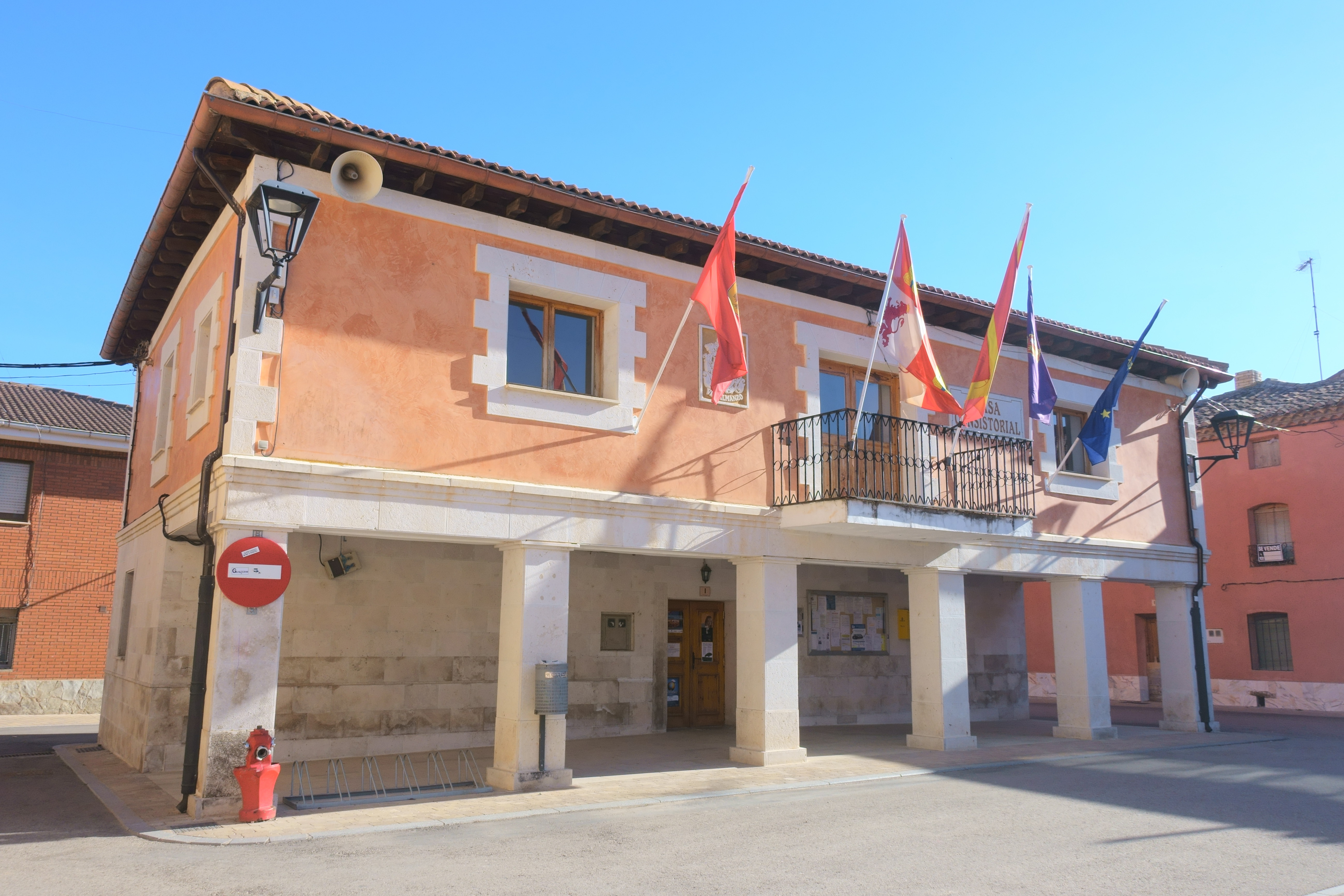
- Town Hall of Villalmanzo

- Coat of arms
- Interactive map of Villalmanzo, Spain
- Coordinates: 42°03′N 3°44′W
- Municipality: Burgos

Government
  - Mayor: Jesús María Sierra Sancho (PP)

Area
  - Total: 24 km^{2} (9.3 sq mi)
  - Land: 24 km^{2} (9.3 sq mi)
  - Water: 0.00 km^{2} (0 sq mi)

Population (2025-01-01)
  - Total: 409
- Time zone: UTC+1 (CET)
  - Summer (DST): UTC+2 (CEST)

Villalmanzo is a village and municipality of the province of Burgos, in the autonomous community of Castile and León, Spain.
