= Villaverde del Monte =

Coordinates: 42.16°N 3.81472°W

- municipality
- Flag Coat of arms
- Interactive map of Villaverde del Monte
- Country: Spain
- Autonomous community: Castile and León
- Province: Burgos

Area
  - Total: 37 km^{2} (14 sq mi)

Population (2025-01-01)
  - Total: 112
  - Density: 3.0/km^{2} (7.8/sq mi)
- Time zone: UTC+1 (CET)
  - Summer (DST): UTC+2 (CEST)

Villaverde del Monte is a municipality located in the province of Burgos, Castile and León, Spain. According to the 2004 census (INE), the municipality has a population of 170 inhabitants.

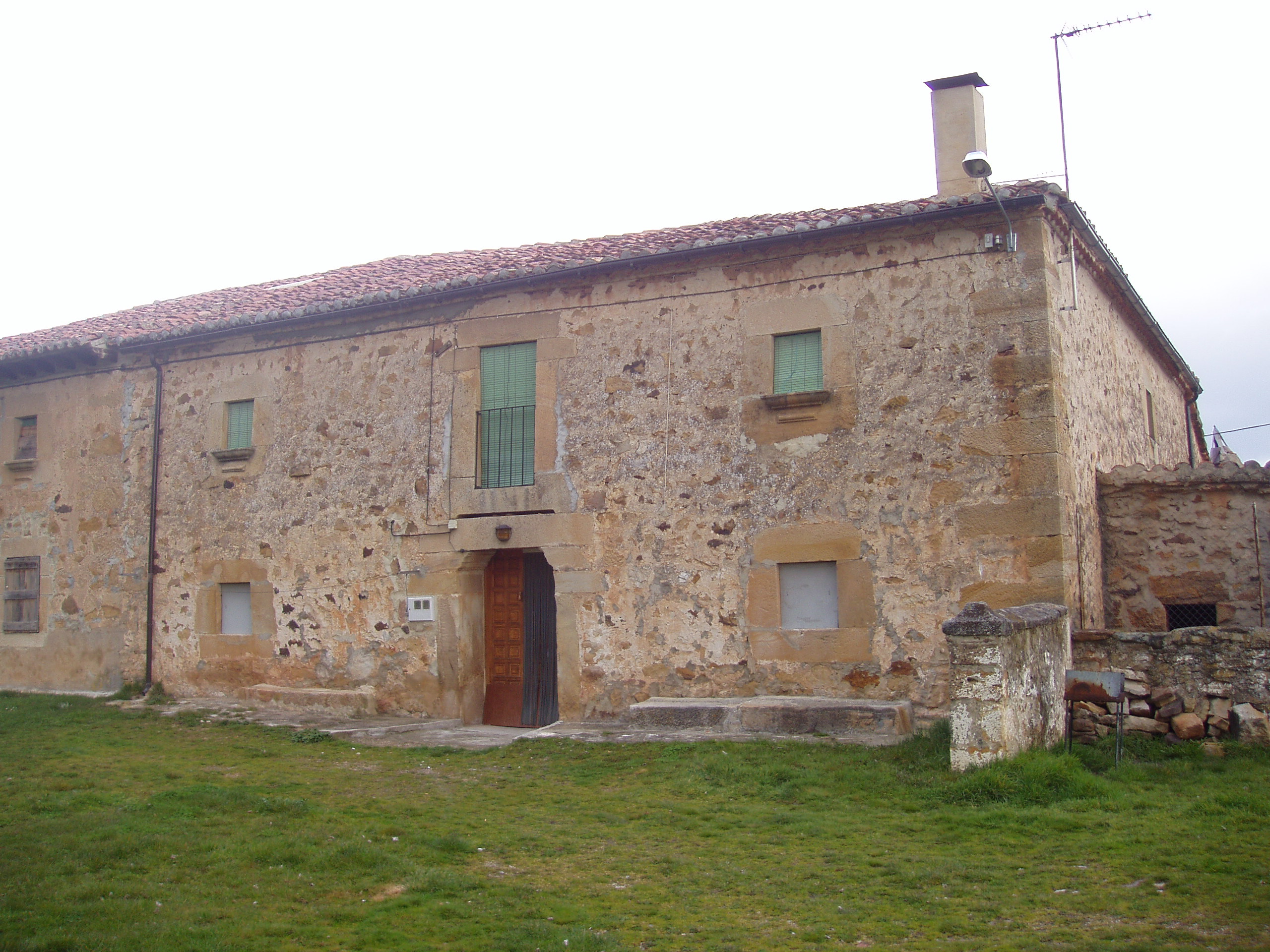
Pine house in Villaverde del Monte, Burgos, Spain
