= Villangómez =

Coordinates: 42°11′N 3°46′W

- Coat of arms
- Interactive map of Villangómez
- Country: Spain
- Autonomous community: Castile and León
- Province: Burgos
- Municipality: Villangómez

Area
  - Total: 38 km^{2} (15 sq mi)

Population (2025-01-01)
  - Total: 229
  - Density: 6.0/km^{2} (16/sq mi)
- Time zone: UTC+1 (CET)
  - Summer (DST): UTC+2 (CEST)

Villangómez is a municipality located in the province of Burgos, Castile and León, Spain. According to the 2004 census (INE), the municipality has a population of 315 inhabitants.

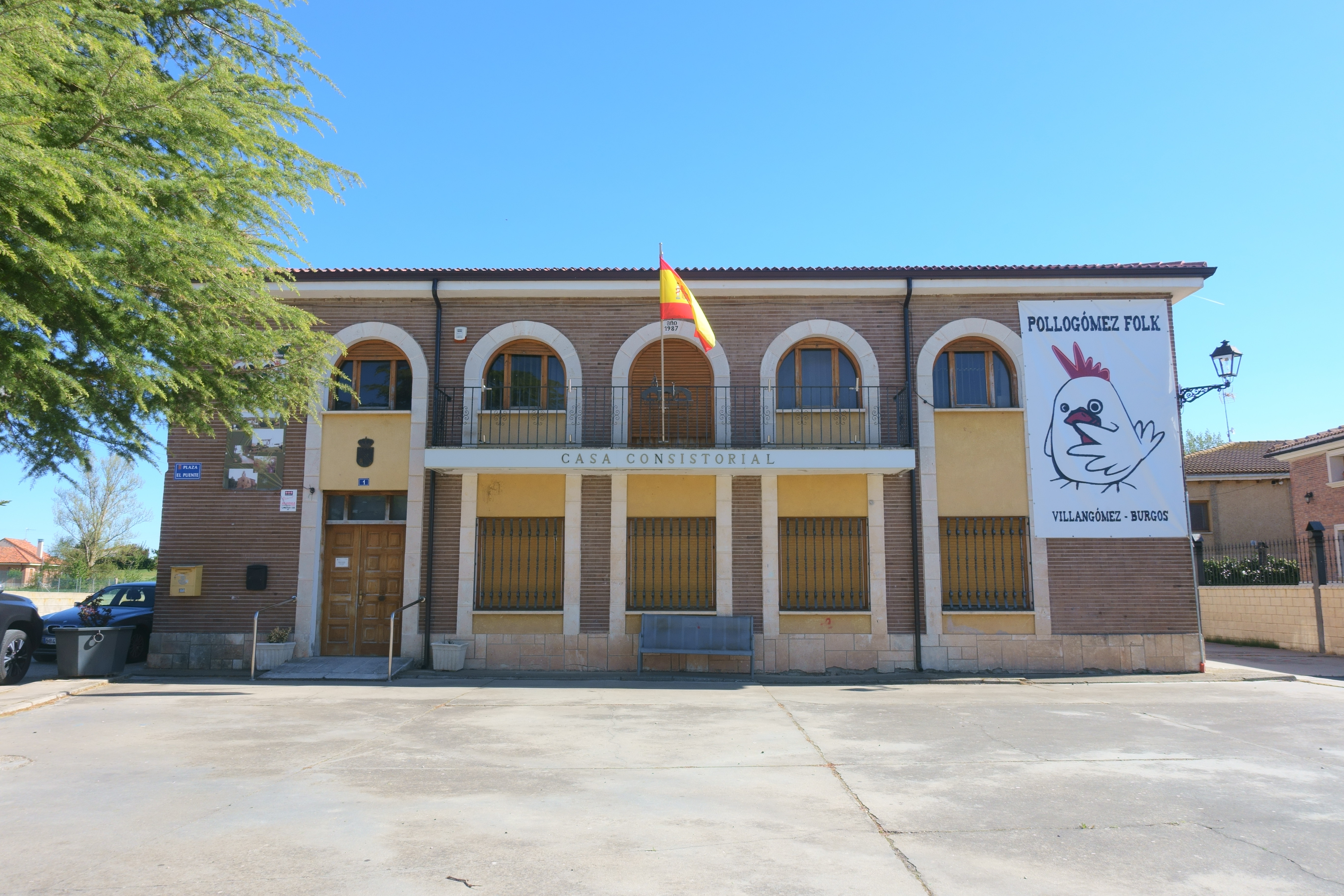
Town Hall of Villangómez
