= Villaquirán de los Infantes =

Coordinates: 42°14′N 4°00′W

Villaquirán de los Infantes, Spain
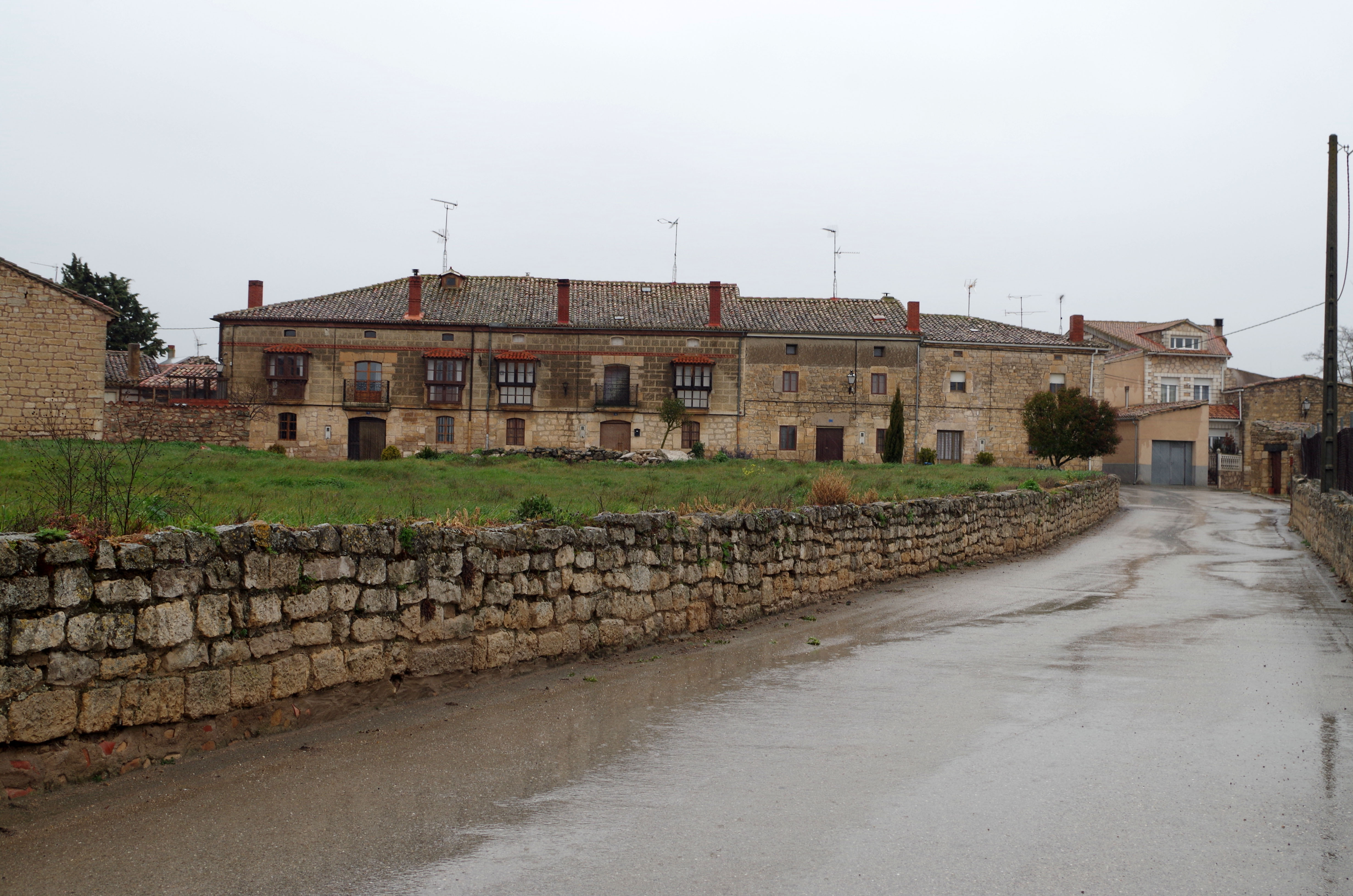

- Flag Coat of arms
- Interactive map of Villaquirán de los Infantes, Spain
- Country: Spain
- Autonomous community: Castile and León
- Province: Burgos
- Municipality: Villaquirán de los Infantes

Area
  - Total: 13 km^{2} (5.0 sq mi)

Population (2025-01-01)
  - Total: 154
  - Density: 12/km^{2} (31/sq mi)
- Time zone: UTC+1 (CET)
  - Summer (DST): UTC+2 (CEST)

Villaquirán de los Infantes is a municipality located in the province of Burgos, Castile and León, Spain. According to the 2004 census (INE), the municipality has a population of 187 inhabitants.
