= Alfoz de Burgos =

Coordinates: 42.3133°N 3.6684°W

- Comarca
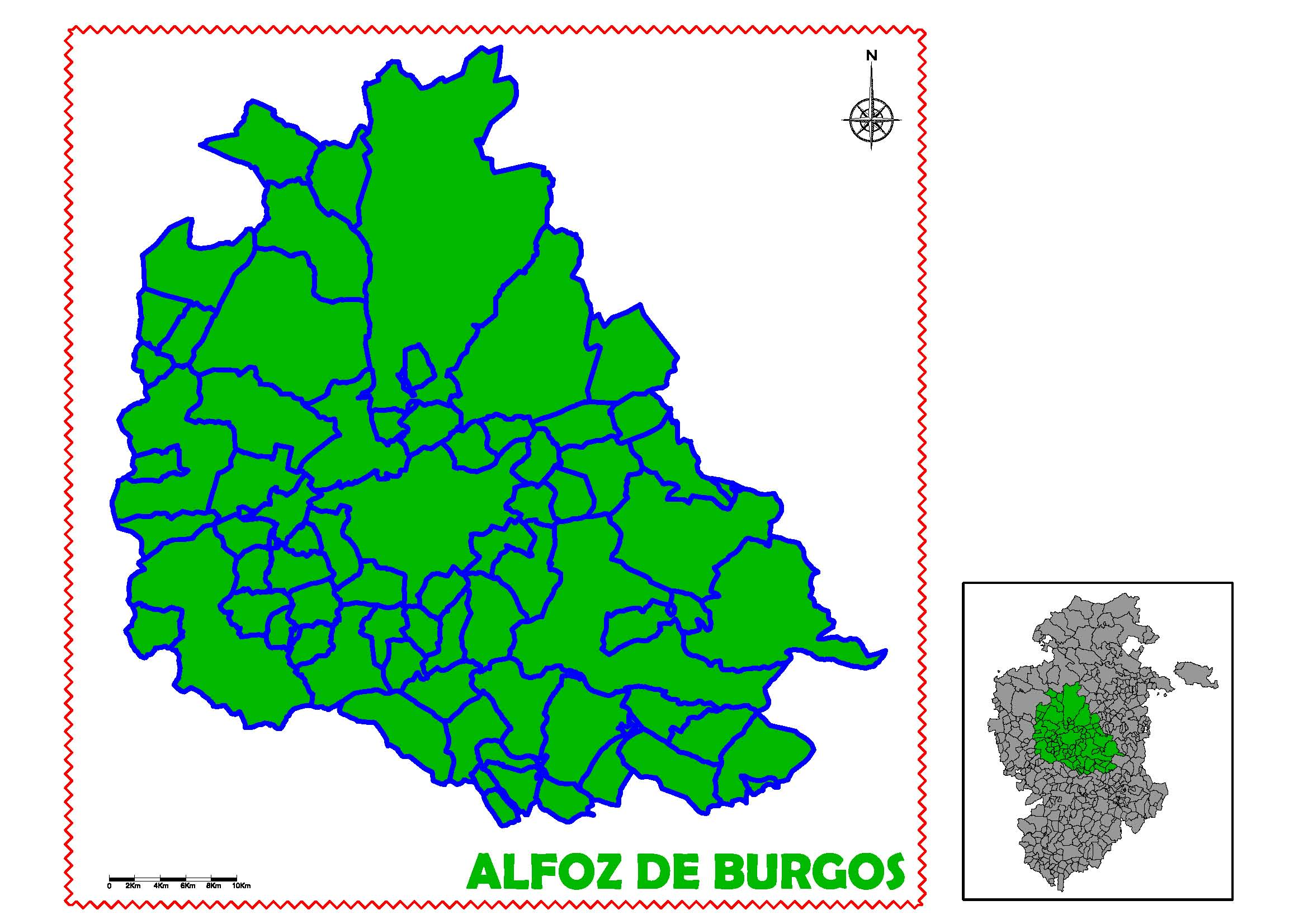
- Country: Spain
- Autonomous community: Castile and León
- Province: Burgos
- Capital: Burgos
- Municipalities: List: See text
- Time zone: UTC+1 (CET)
  - Summer (DST): UTC+2 (CEST)
- Largest municipality: Burgos

Alfoz de Burgos is a comarca located in the center of the province of Burgos, in the autonomous community of Castile and León. It is bounded on the north-west by La Bureba, north-east by the Páramos comarca, south-west by the Arlanza comarca, south-east by the Sierra de la Demanda, on the east by the Odra-Pisuerga comarca and west by the Montes de Oca.

== Administrative Entities ==
The comarca capital is Burgos and this city agrees with its judicial party.

=== Municipalities (61) ===
- Albillos
- Alfoz de Quintanadueñas (4)
- Arcos de la Llana (1)
- Arlanzón (4)
- Atapuerca
- Barrios de Colina
- Buniel
- Burgos (1)
- Campolara
- Carcedo de Burgos (1)
- Cardeñadijo
- Cardeñajimeno (2)
- Cardeñuela Riopico
- Castrillo del Val
- Cavia
- Cayuela (1)
- Celada del Camino
- Cogollos
- Cubillo del Campo
- Estépar (10)
- Frandovínez
- Fresno de Rodilla
- Hontoria de la Cantera
- Hornillos del Camino
- Huérmeces (3)
- Hurones
- Ibeas de Juarros (8)
- Isar (3)
- Las Quintanillas
- Los Ausines
- Merindad de Río Ubierna (15)
- Modúbar de la Emparedada
- Orbaneja Riopico (1)
- Palazuelos de la Sierra
- Pedrosa de Río Úrbel
- Pineda de la Sierra
- Quintanaortuño
- Quintanapalla
- Quintanilla Vivar (1)
- Rabé de las Calzadas
- Revilla del Campo (1)
- Revillarruz (2)
- Rubena
- Saldaña de Burgos
- San Adrián de Juarros
- San Mamés de Burgos (1)
- Santa María del Invierno (1)
- Sarracín
- Sotragero
- Tardajos
- Tinieblas de la Sierra
- Torrelara
- Valle de las Navas
- Valle de Santibáñez (9)
- Villagonzalo Pedernales
- Villalbilla de Burgos (1)
- Villamiel de la Sierra
- Villanueva de Argaño
- Villariezo
- Villasur de Herreros
- Villayerno Morquillas

== See also ==
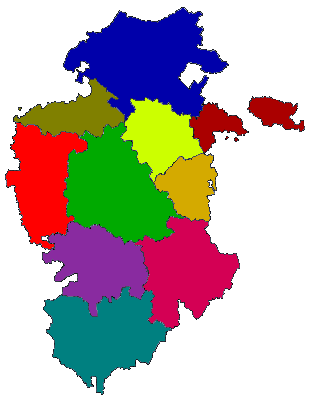
Shires of the province of Burgos.: Páramos Alfoz de Burgos Odra-Pisuerga Arlanza Ribera del Duero / Las Merindades Ebro La Bureba Montes de Oca Sierra de la Demanda

- Province of Burgos
- Burgos
