= Hontoria de la Cantera =

Coordinates: 42°11′N 3°39′W

- Municipality
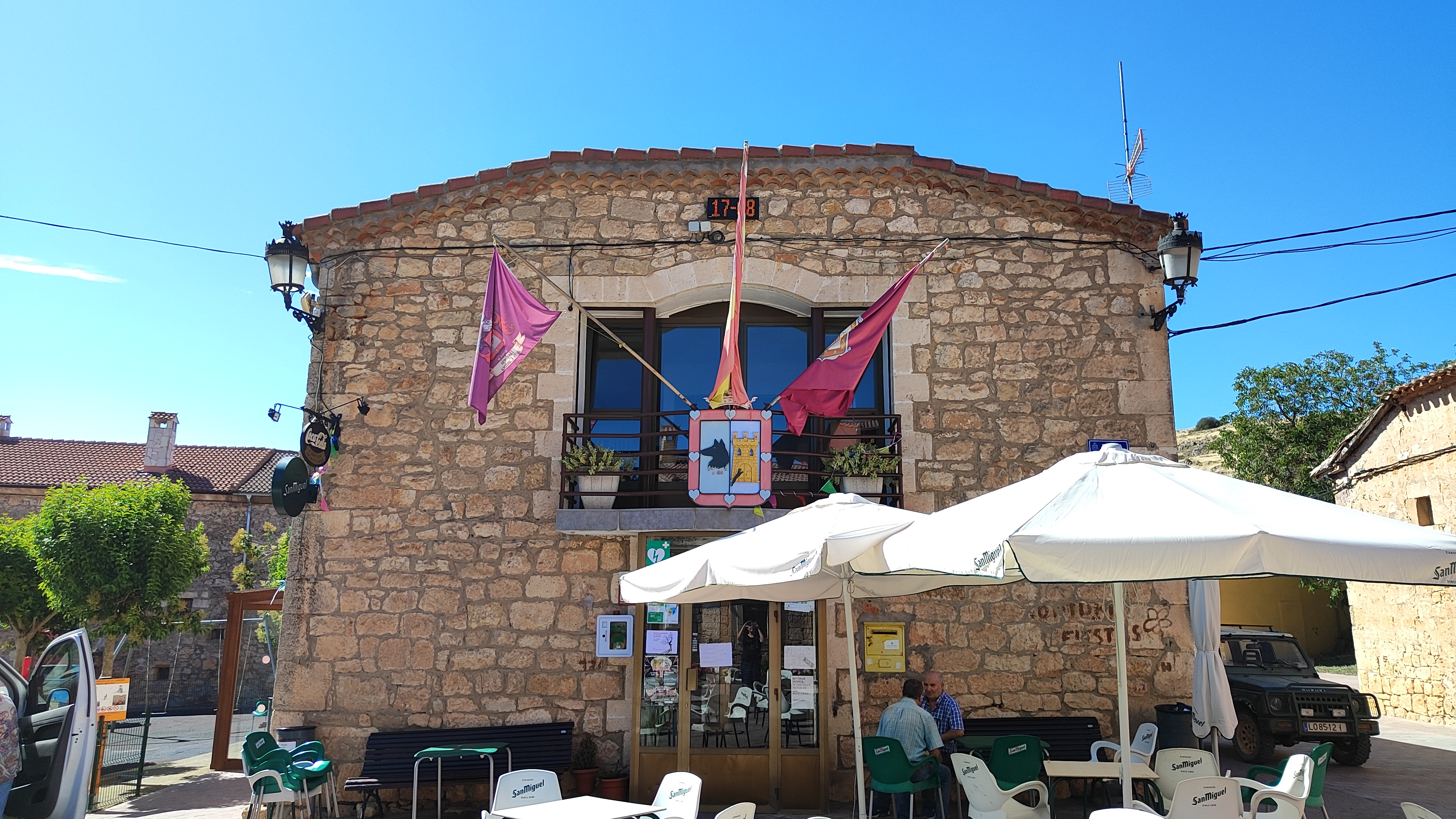
- Town hall

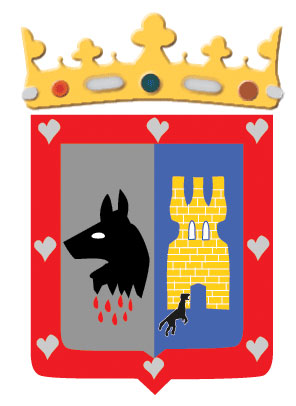
- Coat of arms
- Interactive map of Hontoria de la Cantera
- Country: Spain
- Autonomous community: Castile and León
- Province: Burgos
- Comarca: Alfoz de Burgos

Area
  - Total: 29 km^{2} (11 sq mi)
- Elevation: 950 m (3,120 ft)

Population (2025-01-01)
  - Total: 172
  - Density: 5.9/km^{2} (15/sq mi)
- Time zone: UTC+1 (CET)
  - Summer (DST): UTC+2 (CEST)
- Postal code: 09351
- Website: http://www.hontoriadelacantera.es/

Hontoria de la Cantera is a municipality located in the province of Burgos, Castile and León, Spain. According to the 2004 census (INE), the municipality has a population of 137 inhabitants. Located in the Alfoz de Burgos region, it is 20 kilometers from the capital of Burgos. The municipality is crossed by the N-234 national highway, between kilometers 472 and 475.
