= Huérmeces =

Coordinates: 42°31′N 3°46′W

- Municipality
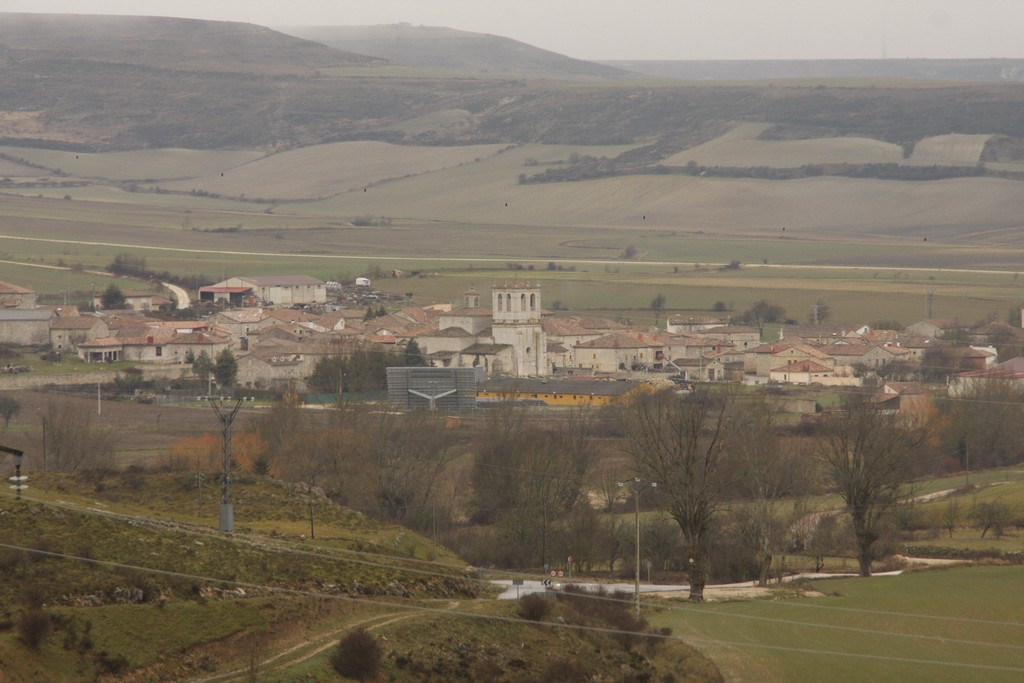
- View of Huérmeces, 2010

- Coat of arms
- Interactive map of Huérmeces
- Country: Spain
- Autonomous community: Castile and León
- Province: Burgos
- Comarca: Alfoz de Burgos

Area
  - Total: 49 km^{2} (19 sq mi)
- Elevation: 884 m (2,900 ft)

Population (2025-01-01)
  - Total: 159
  - Density: 3.2/km^{2} (8.4/sq mi)
- Time zone: UTC+1 (CET)
  - Summer (DST): UTC+2 (CEST)
- Postal code: 09150
- Website: http://www.huermeces.es/

Huérmeces is a municipality located in the province of Burgos, Castile and León, Spain. According to the 2004 census (INE), the municipality has a population of 131 inhabitants.
