= Cavia, Province of Burgos =

Coordinates: 42°17′01″N 3°50′42″W

Cavia
- Municipality and town
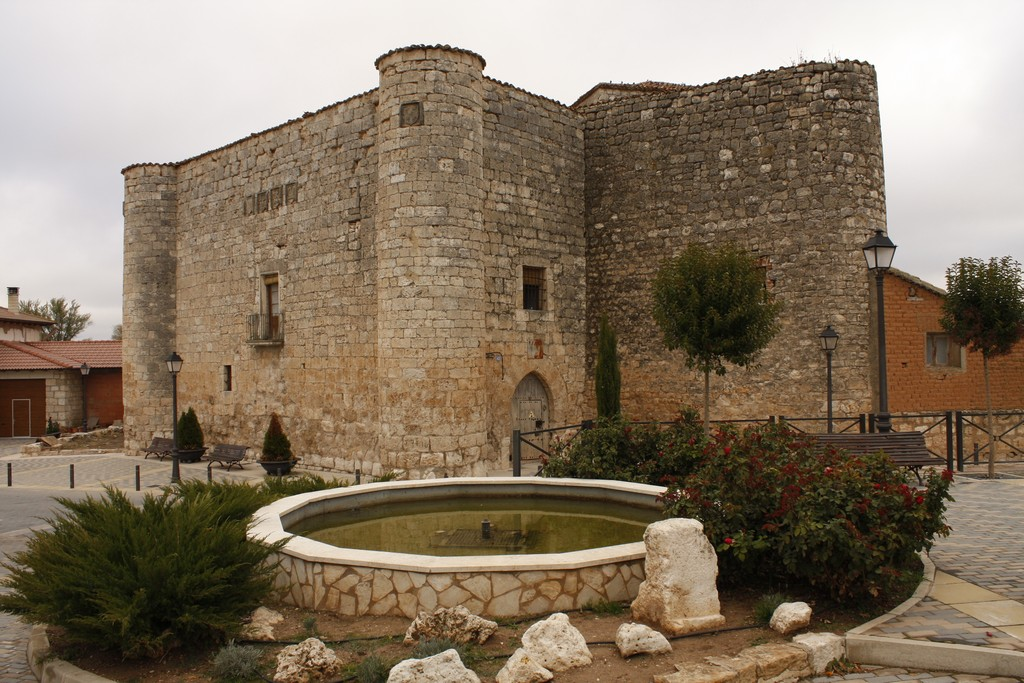
- Cavia castle (15th century)

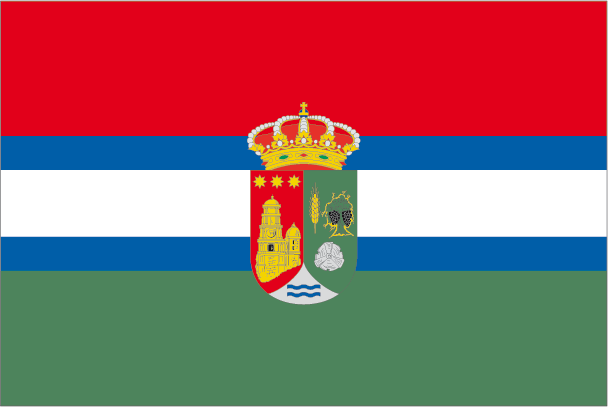
- Flag Coat of arms
- Interactive map of Cavia
- Country: Spain
- Autonomous community: Castile and León
- Province: Burgos
- Comarca: Alfoz de Burgos

Area
  - Total: 13 km^{2} (5.0 sq mi)
- Elevation: 826 m (2,710 ft)

Population (2025-01-01)
  - Total: 246
  - Density: 19/km^{2} (49/sq mi)
- Time zone: UTC+1 (CET)
  - Summer (DST): UTC+2 (CEST)
- Postal code: 09239
- Website: http://www.aytocavia.es/

Cavia is a municipality located in the province of Burgos, Castile and León, Spain.
