= Cogollos =

Coordinates: 42°12′N 3°41′W

- Municipality
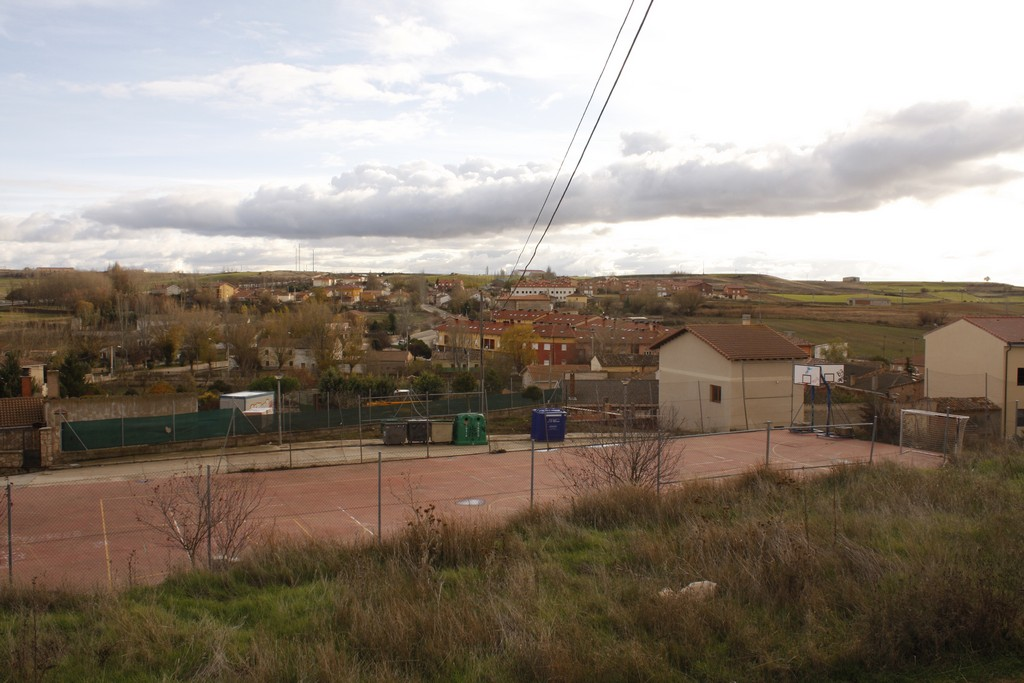
- View of Cogollos, 2009

- Flag Coat of arms
- Interactive map of Cogollos
- Country: Spain
- Autonomous community: Castile and León
- Province: Burgos
- Comarca: Alfoz de Burgos

Area
  - Total: 31 km^{2} (12 sq mi)
- Elevation: 892 m (2,927 ft)

Population (2025-01-01)
  - Total: 687
  - Density: 22/km^{2} (57/sq mi)
- Time zone: UTC+1 (CET)
  - Summer (DST): UTC+2 (CEST)
- Postal code: 09320
- Website: http://www.cogollos.es/

Cogollos is a municipality located in the province of Burgos, Castile and León, Spain. According to the 2004 census (INE), the municipality has a population of 348 inhabitants.
