= Palazuelos de la Sierra =

Coordinates: 42°13′N 3°27′W

- Municipality
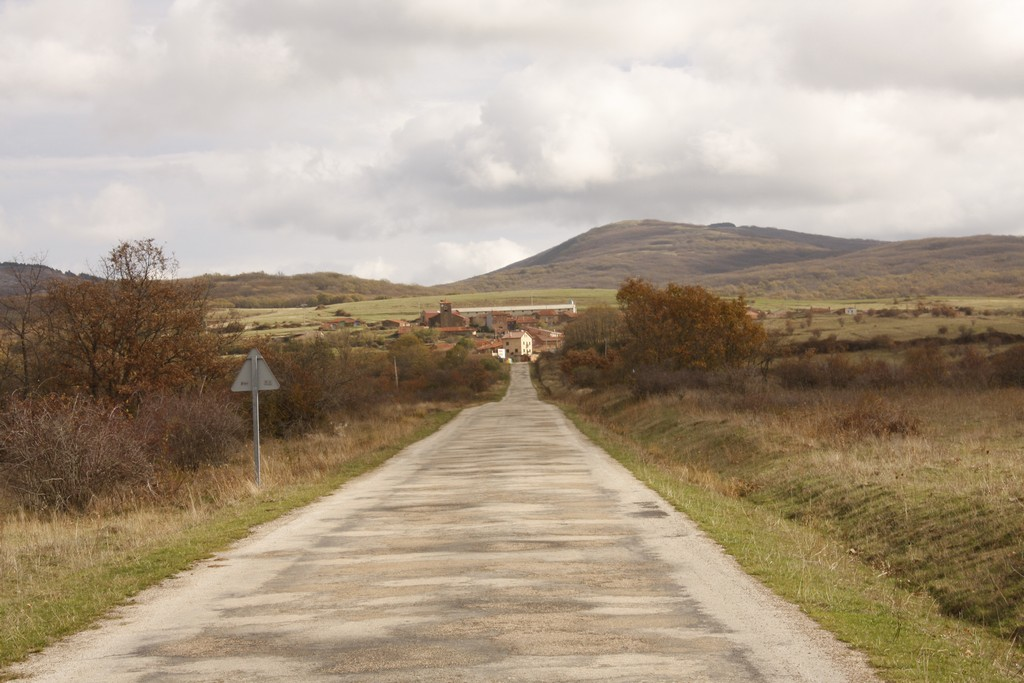
- View of Palazuelos de la Sierra, 2009

- Coat of arms
- Interactive map of Palazuelos de la Sierra
- Country: Spain
- Autonomous community: Castile and León
- Province: Burgos
- Comarca: Alfoz de Burgos

Area
  - Total: 15 km^{2} (5.8 sq mi)
- Elevation: 1,115 m (3,658 ft)

Population (2025-01-01)
  - Total: 95
  - Density: 6.3/km^{2} (16/sq mi)
- Time zone: UTC+1 (CET)
  - Summer (DST): UTC+2 (CEST)
- Postal code: 09198
- Climate: Cfb
- Website: http://www.palazuelosdelasierra.es/

Palazuelos de la Sierra is a municipality and town located in the province of Burgos, Castile and León, Spain. According to the 2022 census (INE), the municipality has a population of 92 inhabitants.
