= Rabé de las Calzadas =

Coordinates: 42°20′N 3°50′W

- Municipality and town
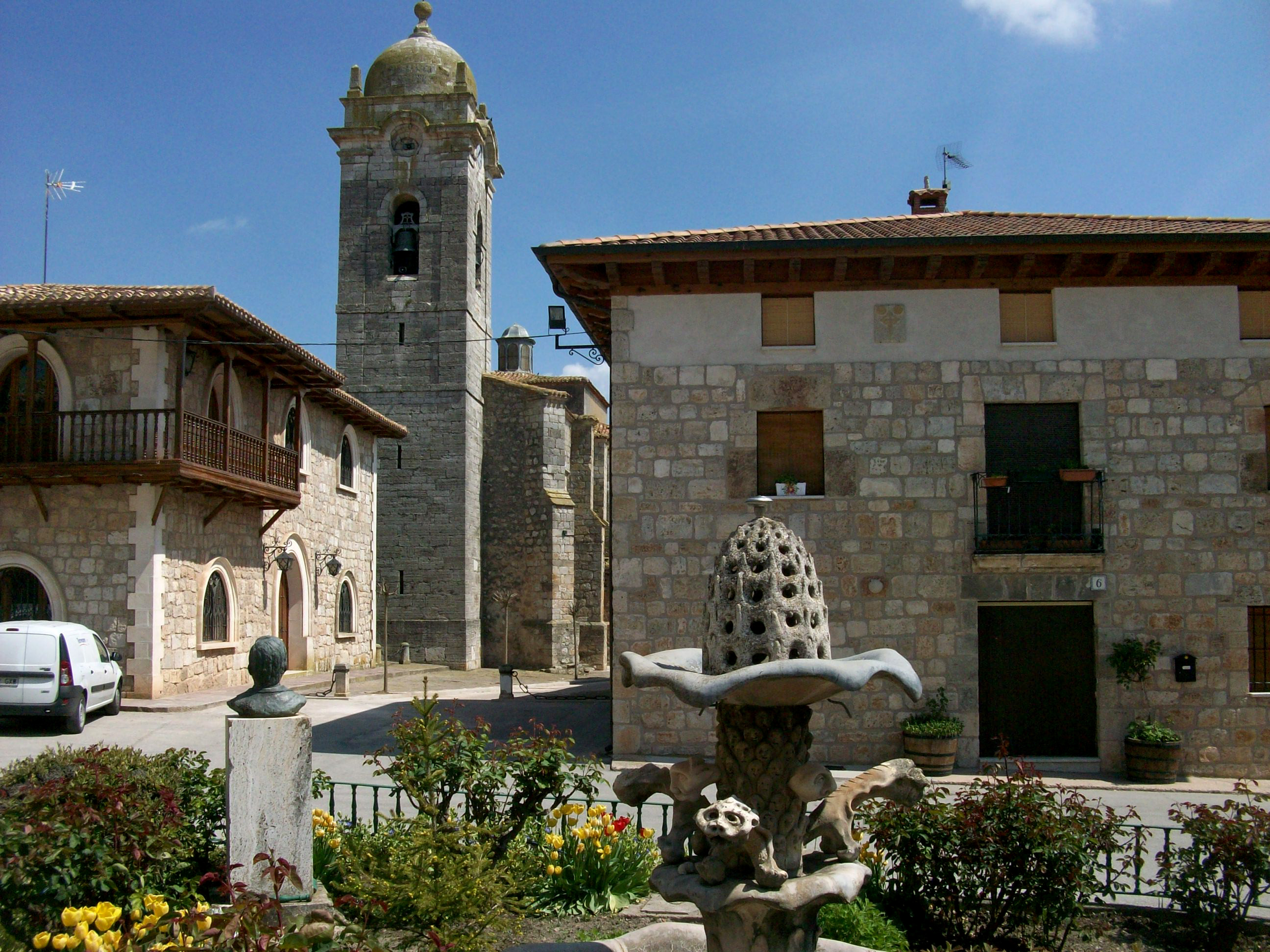
- View of the main square in Rabé de las Calzadas, 2011

- Flag Coat of arms
- Motto: Un suspiro en el camino ("A sight on the way")
- Interactive map of Rabé de las Calzadas
- Country: Spain
- Autonomous community: Castile and León
- Province: Burgos
- Comarca: Alfoz de Burgos

Area
  - Total: 10.107 km^{2} (3.902 sq mi)
- Elevation: 831 m (2,726 ft)

Population (2025-01-01)
  - Total: 259
  - Density: 25.6/km^{2} (66.4/sq mi)
- Time zone: UTC+1 (CET)
  - Summer (DST): UTC+2 (CEST)
- Postal code: 09130
- Website: http://www.rabedelascalzadas.es/

Rabé de las Calzadas is a municipality and town located in the province of Burgos, Castile and León, Spain. According to the 2004 census (INE), the municipality had a population of 154 inhabitants.

== History ==
Camino de Santiago, entrance to the town after crossing the Urbel river. The 20 of February of 1085, King Alfonso VI donated the village to the Hospital of the Emperor, located in the city of Burgos, district of San Pedro de la Fuente and in 1128 Alfonso VII donated to the hospital with all their belongings to the mitra from Burgos, since which time the bishops and archbishops of Burgos held their ownership.

Its name may have its origin from Roman times, since a large number of Roman roads passed through this municipality.

== Rabé de Las Calzadas in the movies ==
- 2005 : Saint-Jacques... La Mecque de Coline Serreau
