= San Mamés de Burgos =

Coordinates: 42°20′N 3°47′W

- Municipality and town
- Flag Coat of arms
- Interactive map of San Mamés de Burgos
- Country: Spain
- Autonomous community: Castile and León
- Province: Burgos
- Comarca: Alfoz de Burgos

Area
  - Total: 5.01 km^{2} (1.93 sq mi)
- Elevation: 841 m (2,759 ft)

Population (2025-01-01)
  - Total: 323
  - Density: 64.5/km^{2} (167/sq mi)
- Time zone: UTC+1 (CET)
  - Summer (DST): UTC+2 (CEST)
- Postal code: 09230
- Website: http://www.sanmamesdeburgos.es/

San Mamés de Burgos is a municipality and town located in the province of Burgos, Castile and León, Spain. According to the 2004 census (INE), the municipality has a population of 258 inhabitants.

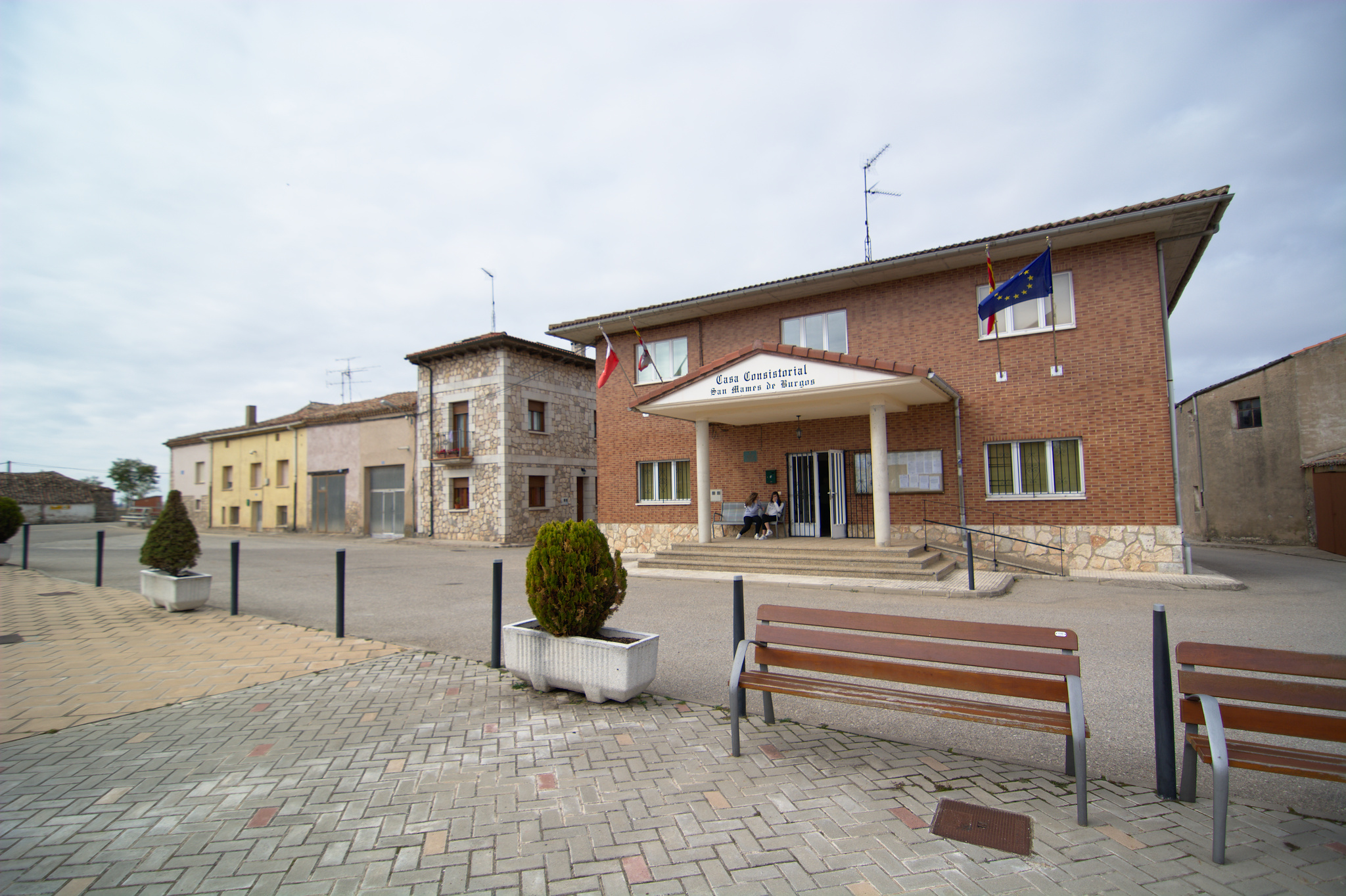
Town Hall of San Mamés de Burgos
