= Albillos =

Coordinates: 42°16′N 3°47′W

- Municipality and town
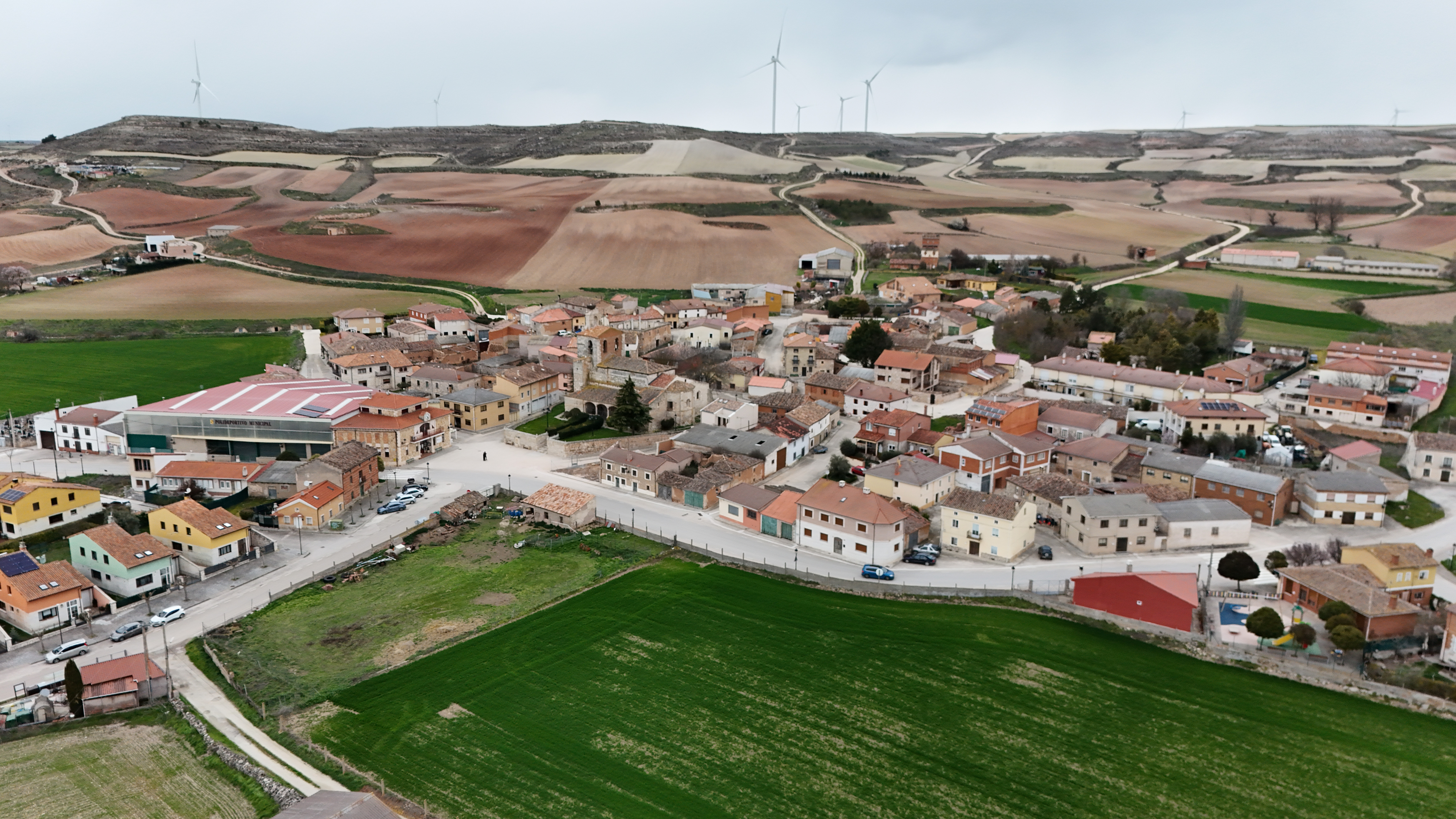
- Aerial view of Albillos

- Flag Coat of arms
- Interactive map of Albillos
- Country: Spain
- Autonomous community: Castile and León
- Province: Burgos
- Comarca: Alfoz de Burgos

Area
  - Total: 12.36 km^{2} (4.77 sq mi)
- Elevation: 830 m (2,720 ft)
- Time zone: UTC+1 (CET)
  - Summer (DST): UTC+2 (CEST)
- Postal code: 09239
- Website: https://albillos.burgos.es/

Albillos is a municipality and town in the province of Burgos, Spain, located about 10 kilometers from the province's capital, Burgos.
