= Las Quintanillas =

- Municipality and town
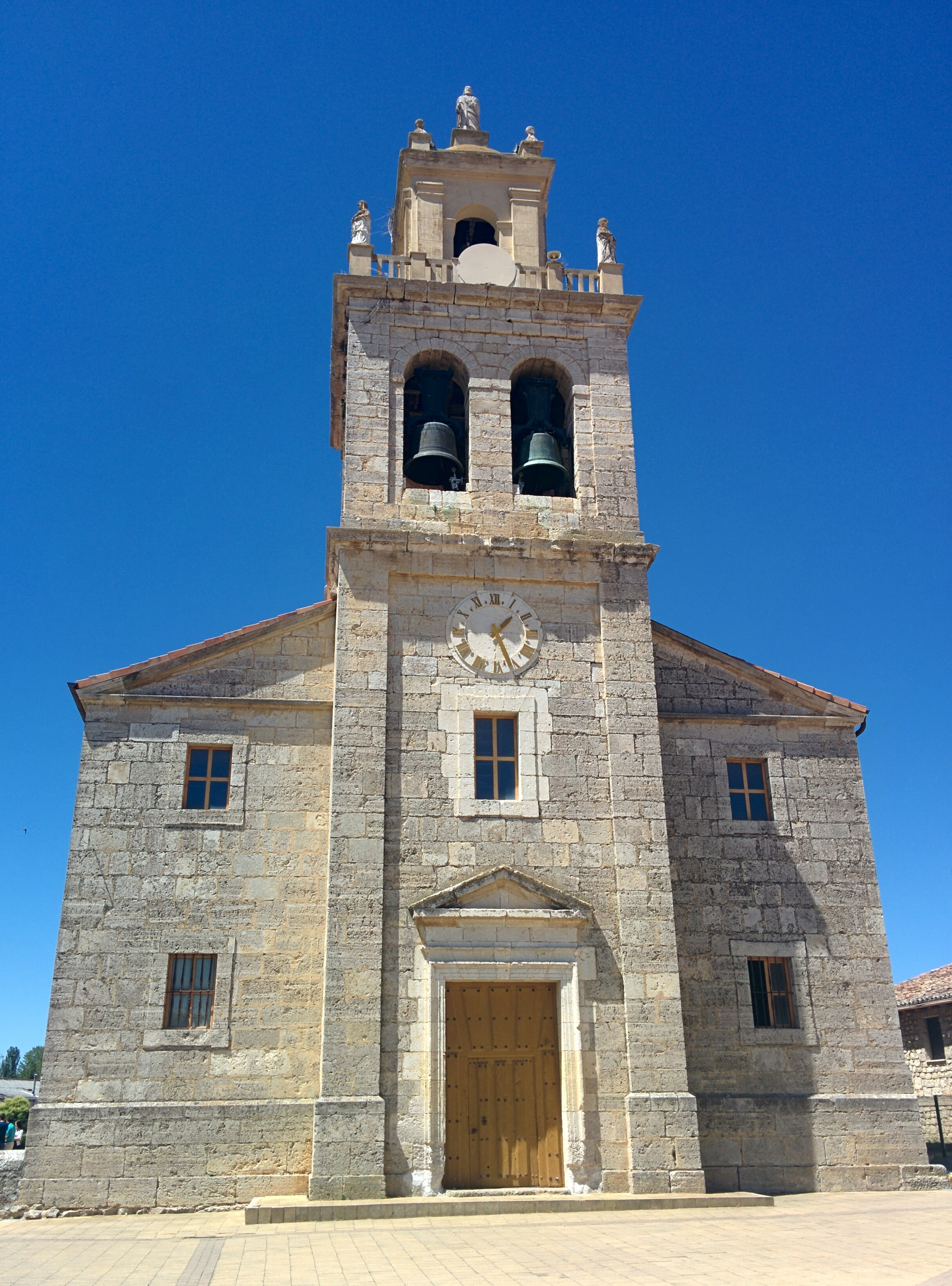
- Church of San Facundo and San Primitivo, in Las Quintanillas (Burgos, Spain).

- Coat of arms
- Interactive map of Las Quintanillas
- Coordinates: 42.3722°N 3.8431°W
- Country: Spain
- Autonomous community: Castile and León
- Province: Burgos
- Comarca: Alfoz de Burgos

Area
  - Total: 24 km^{2} (9.3 sq mi)
- Elevation: 844 m (2,769 ft)

Population (2025-01-01)
  - Total: 386
  - Density: 16/km^{2} (42/sq mi)
- Time zone: UTC+1 (CET)
  - Summer (DST): UTC+2 (CEST)
- Postal code: 09131
- Website: http://www.lasquintanillas.es/

Las Quintanillas is a municipality and town located in the province of Burgos, Castile and León, Spain. According to the 2022 census (INE), the municipality has a population of 380 inhabitants.
