= Cardeñuela Riopico =

Coordinates: 42°21′36″N 3°33′28″W

- Municipality and town
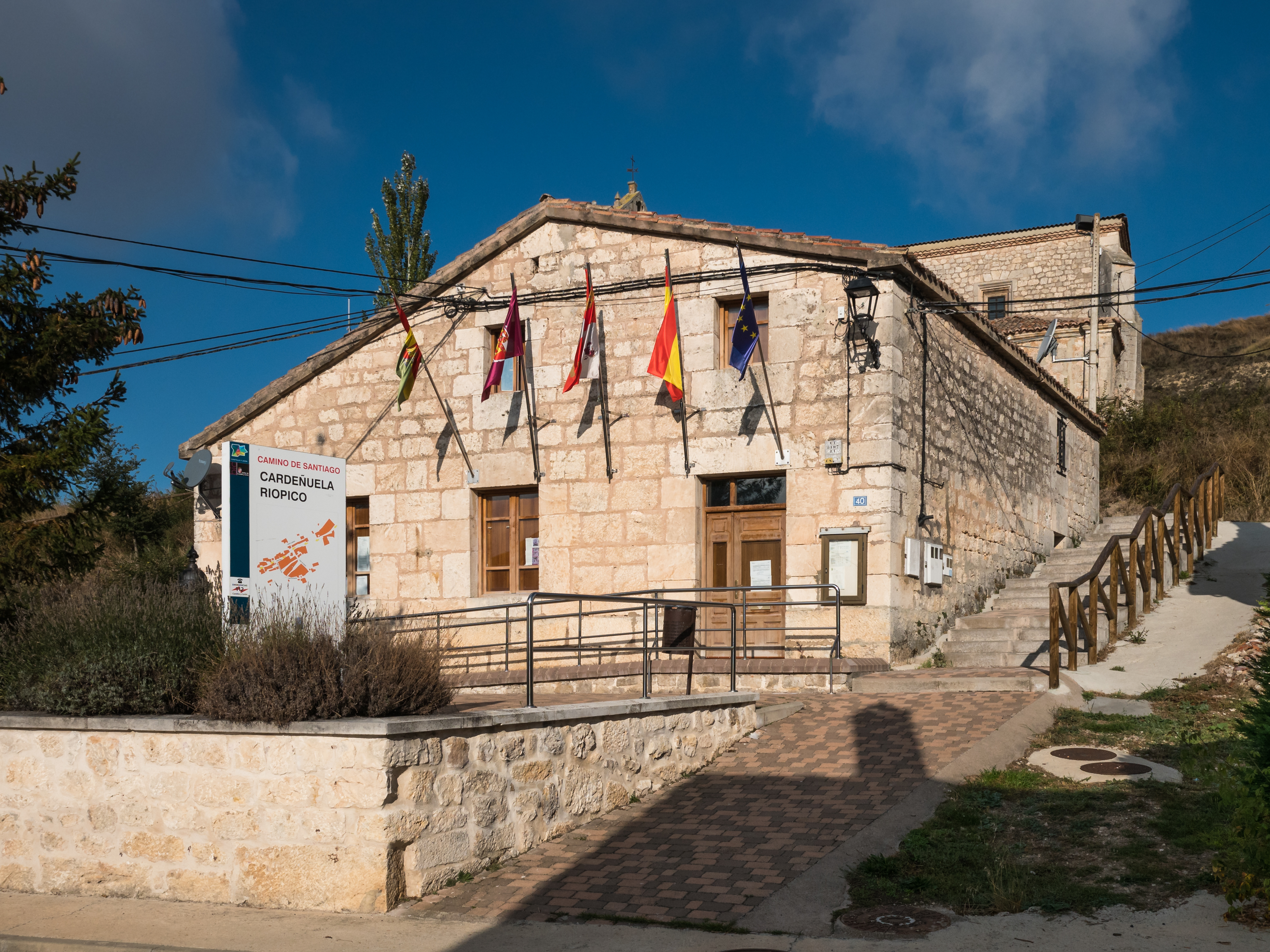
- Cardeñuela Riopico town hall

- Flag Coat of arms
- Interactive map of Cardeñuela Riopico
- Country: Spain
- Autonomous community: Castile and León
- Province: Burgos
- Comarca: Alfoz de Burgos

Area
  - Total: 11.30 km^{2} (4.36 sq mi)
- Elevation: 933 m (3,061 ft)

Population (2025-01-01)
  - Total: 106
  - Density: 9.38/km^{2} (24.3/sq mi)
- Time zone: UTC+1 (CET)
  - Summer (DST): UTC+2 (CEST)
- Postal code: 09192
- Website: https://www.cardeñuelariopico.es/

Cardeñuela Riopico is a municipality located in the province of Burgos, Castile and León, Spain.

== Demographics ==
According to the 2007 census (INE), the municipality has a population of 111 inhabitants.
