= Rubena =

Coordinates: 42°23′N 3°34′W

- Municipality and town
- Coat of arms
- Interactive map of Rubena
- Country: Spain
- Autonomous community: Castile and León
- Province: Burgos
- Comarca: Alfoz de Burgos

Area
  - Total: 9.77 km^{2} (3.77 sq mi)
- Elevation: 910 m (2,990 ft)

Population (2025-01-01)
  - Total: 207
  - Density: 21.2/km^{2} (54.9/sq mi)
- Time zone: UTC+1 (CET)
  - Summer (DST): UTC+2 (CEST)
- Postal code: 09199
- Website: http://www.rubena.es/

Rubena is a municipality and town located in the province of Burgos, Castile and León, Spain. According to the 2004 census (INE), the municipality has a population of 176.

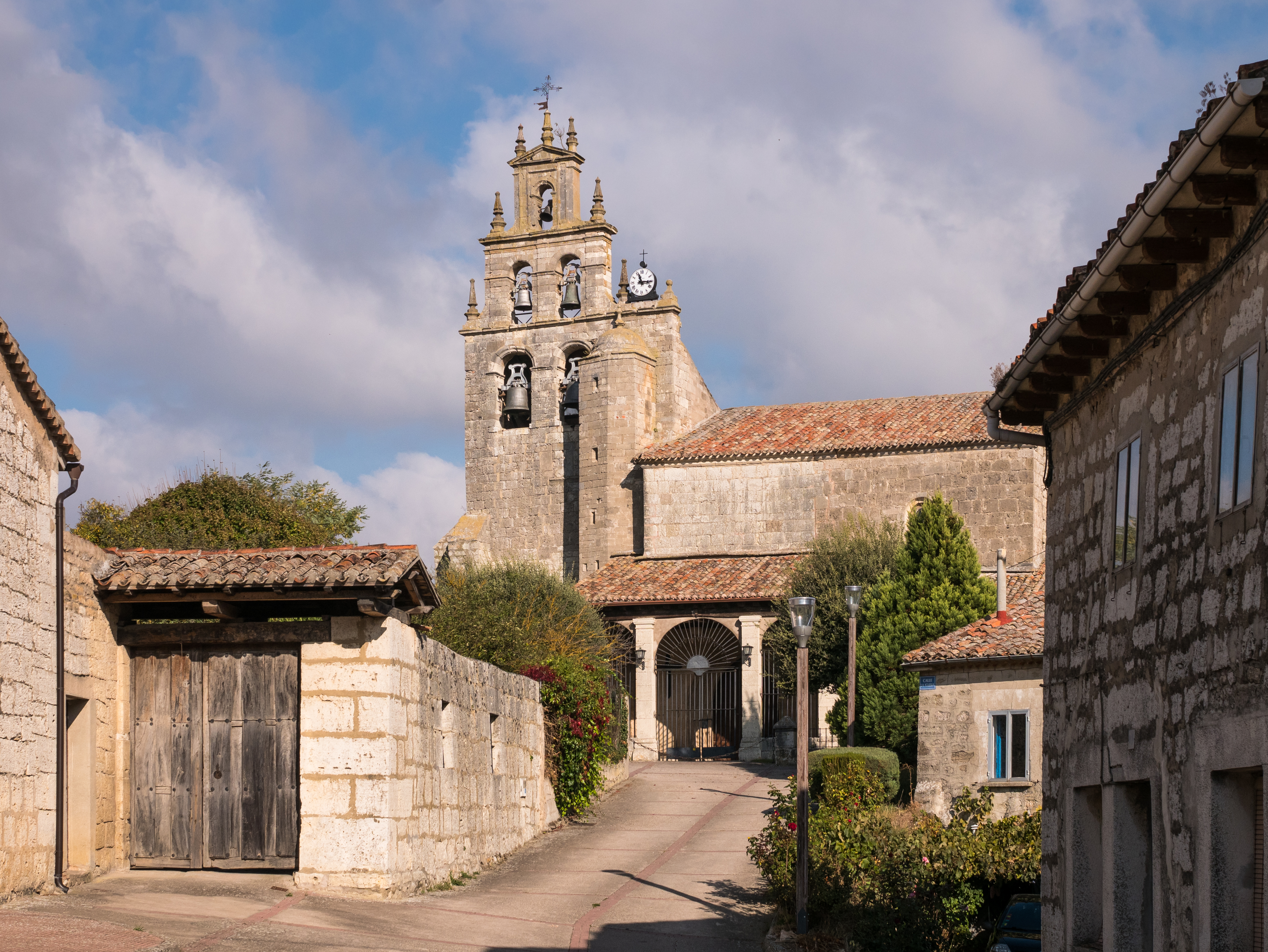
Church of Rubena, Burgos, Castilla-León, Spain
