= Sotragero =

Coordinates: 42°24′N 3°43′W

- Municipality and town
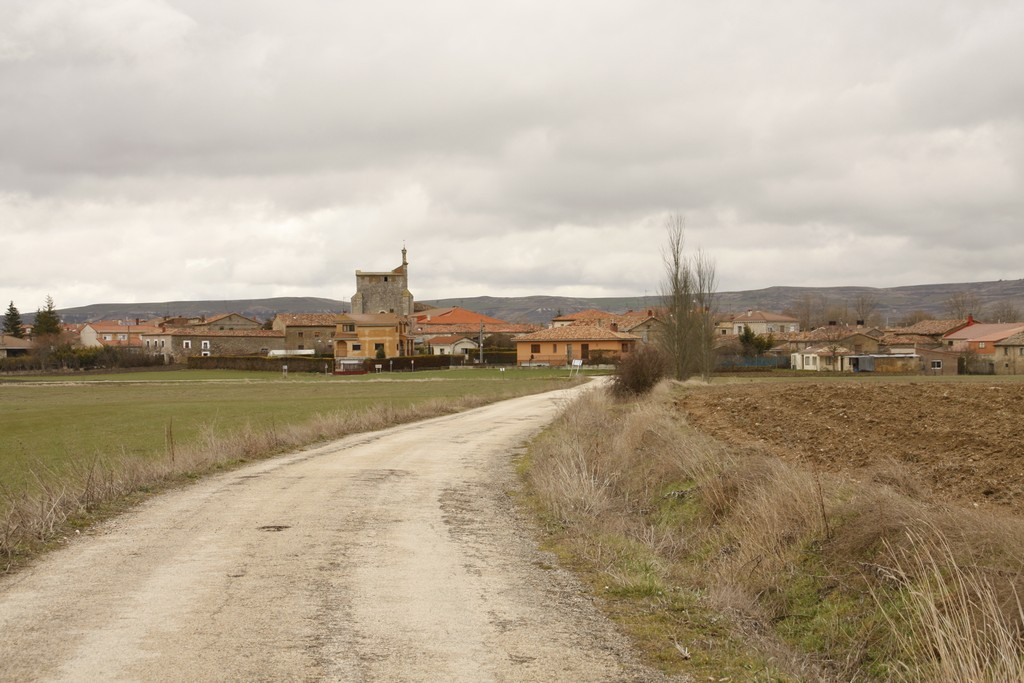
- View of Sotragero, 2010

- Flag Coat of arms
- Interactive map of Sotragero
- Country: Spain
- Autonomous community: Castile and León
- Province: Burgos
- Comarca: Alfoz de Burgos
- Founded: 870-880

Area
  - Total: 5 km^{2} (1.9 sq mi)

Population (2025-01-01)
  - Total: 300
  - Density: 60/km^{2} (160/sq mi)
- Time zone: UTC+1 (CET)
  - Summer (DST): UTC+2 (CEST)
- Postal code: 09197
- Website: http://www.aytosotragero.com/ http://sotragero.burgos.es/

Sotragero is a municipality and town located in the province of Burgos, Castile and León, Spain. According to the 2007 census (INE), the municipality has a population of 230 inhabitants. Sotragero is 8 km north from Burgos, and it is a member of the Alfoz de Burgos in the valley of the Ubierna river.
