= Alfoz de Quintanadueñas =

- Municipality
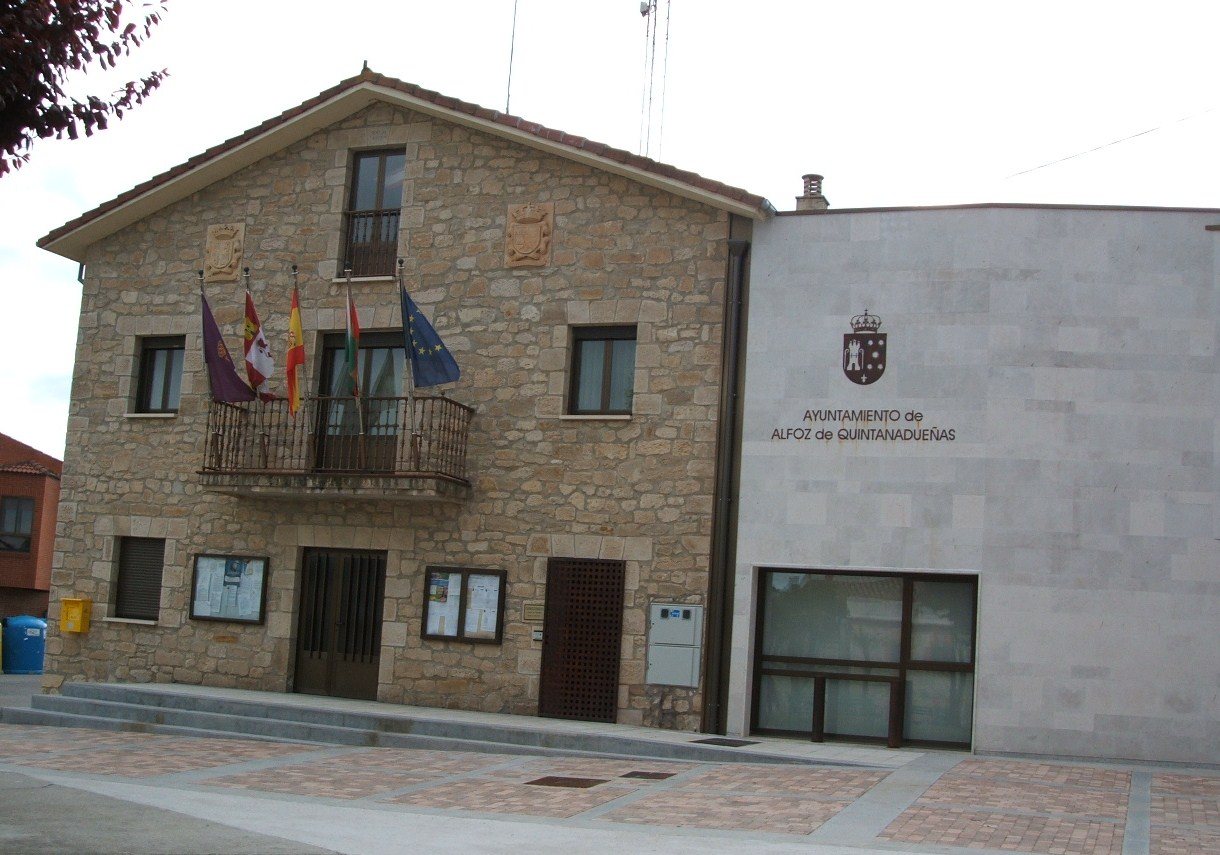
- Town hall

- Flag Coat of arms

- Location within Castile and León Location within Spain
- Coordinates: 41°39′0″N 03°30′0″W
- Country: Spain
- Autonomous community: Castile and León
- Province: Burgos
- Comarca: Alfoz de Burgos
- Seat: Quintanadueñas

Area
  - Total: 41.51 km^{2} (16.03 sq mi)
- Elevation: 845 m (2,772 ft)

Population (2004)
  - Total: 1,300
  - Density: 31/km^{2} (81/sq mi)
- Time zone: UTC+1 (CET)
  - Summer (DST): UTC+2 (CEST)
- Postal code: 09197
- Website: http://www.alfozdequintanadueñas.es/

Alfoz de Quintanadueñas is a municipality located in the province of Burgos, Castile and León, Spain. According to the 2004 census (INE), the municipality has a population of 1,300 inhabitants.

The Alfoz de Quintanadueñas is made up of five towns: Quintanadueñas (seat or capital), Arroyal, Marmellar de Arriba, Páramo del Arroyo and Villarmero.
