= Orbaneja Riopico =

- Municipality and town
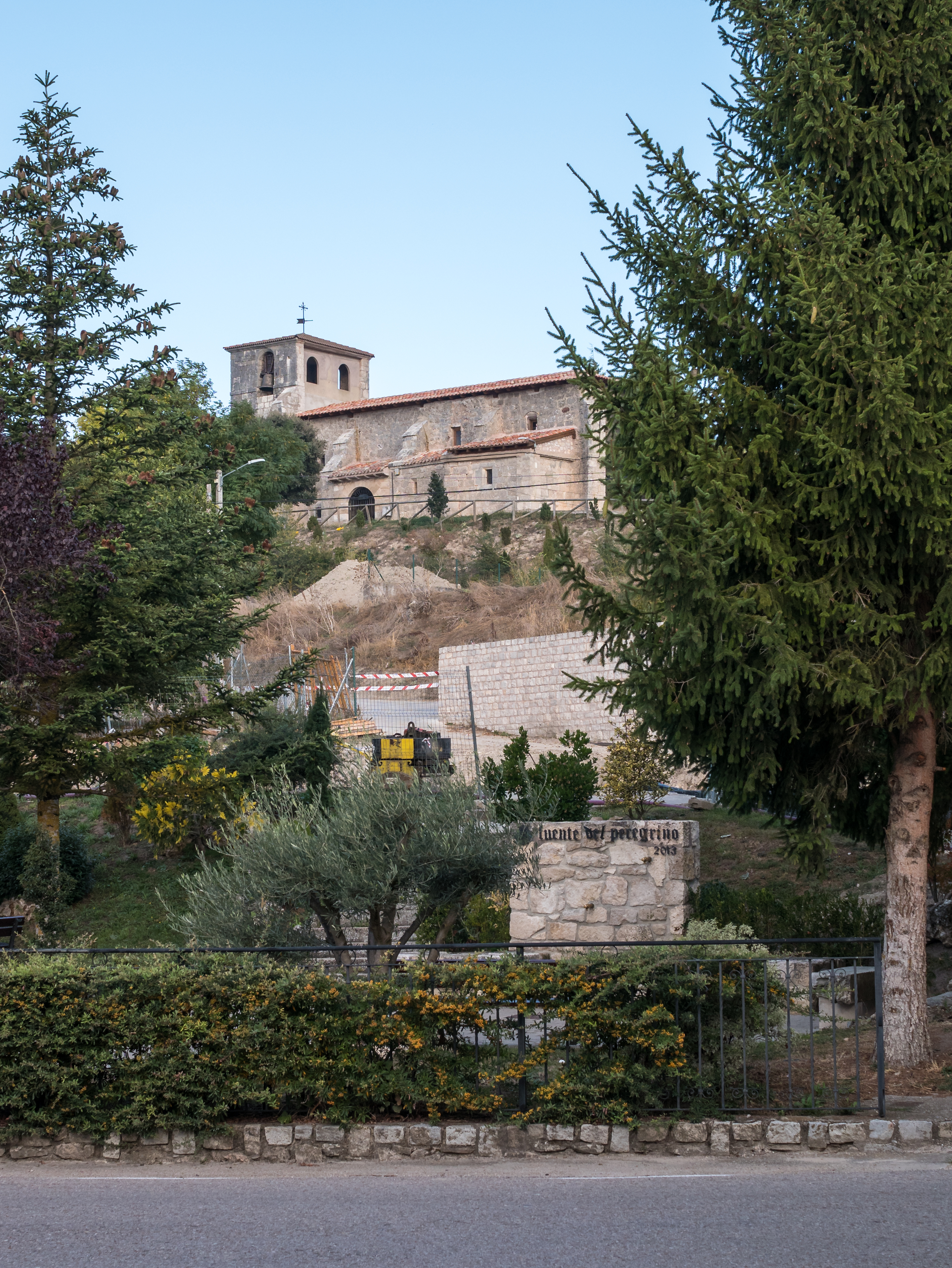
- Church of Orbaneja Riopico

- Flag Coat of arms
- Interactive map of Orbaneja Riopico
- Coordinates: 42.3666°N 3.5833°W
- Country: Spain
- Autonomous community: Castile and León
- Province: Burgos
- Comarca: Alfoz de Burgos

Area
  - Total: 9 km^{2} (3.5 sq mi)
- Elevation: 925 m (3,035 ft)

Population (2025-01-01)
  - Total: 341
  - Density: 38/km^{2} (98/sq mi)
- Time zone: UTC+1 (CET)
  - Summer (DST): UTC+2 (CEST)
- Postal code: 09192
- Website: http://www.orbanejariopico.es/

Orbaneja Riopico is a municipality and town located in the province of Burgos, Castile and León, Spain. According to the 2004 census (INE), the municipality has a population of 177 inhabitants.
