= Tinieblas de la Sierra =

- Municipality and town
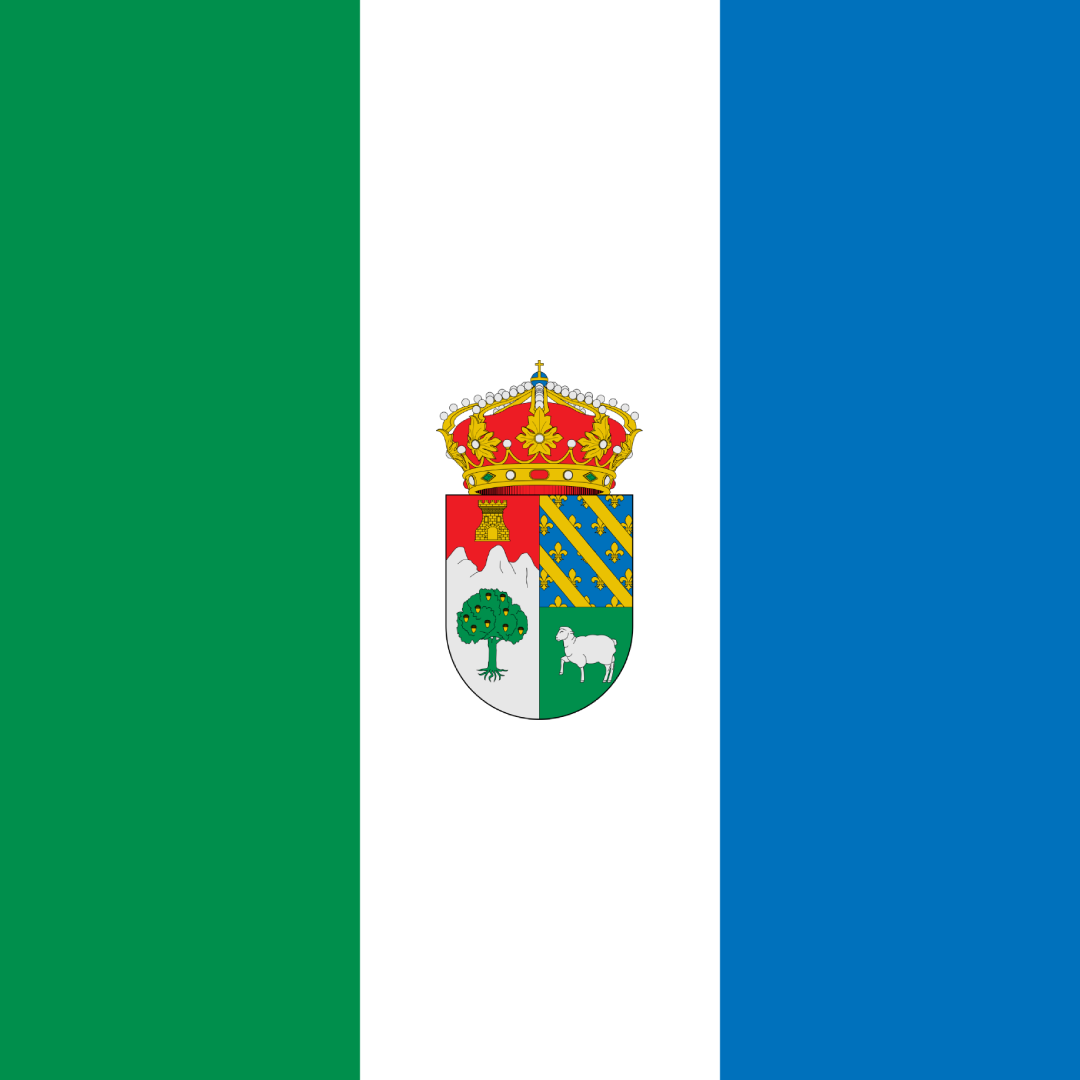
- Flag Coat of arms

- Location in Spain
- Coordinates: 42.1728°N 3.3633°W
- Country: Spain
- Autonomous community: Castile and León
- Province: Burgos
- Comarca: Alfoz de Burgos

Area
  - Total: 29 km^{2} (11 sq mi)

Population (2025-01-01)
  - Total: 20
  - Density: 0.69/km^{2} (1.8/sq mi)
- Time zone: UTC+1 (CET)
  - Summer (DST): UTC+2 (CEST)
- Postal code: 09198
- Website: http://www.tinieblasdelasierra.es/

Tinieblas de la Sierra is a municipality and town located in the province of Burgos, Castile and León, Spain. According to the 2004 census (INE), the municipality has a population of 46 inhabitants.
