= Modúbar de la Emparedada =

Coordinates: 42°16′N 3°39′W

- Municipality and town
- Flag Coat of arms
- Interactive map of Modúbar de la Emparedada
- Country: Spain
- Autonomous community: Castile and León
- Province: Burgos
- Comarca: Alfoz de Burgos

Area
  - Total: 11 km^{2} (4.2 sq mi)
- Elevation: 886 m (2,907 ft)

Population (2025-01-01)
  - Total: 773
  - Density: 70/km^{2} (180/sq mi)
- Time zone: UTC+1 (CET)
  - Summer (DST): UTC+2 (CEST)
- Postal code: 09620
- Website: http://www.modubardelaemparedada.es/

Modúbar de la Emparedada is a municipality and town located in the province of Burgos, Castile and León, Spain. According to the 2004 census (INE), the municipality has a population of 367 inhabitants.

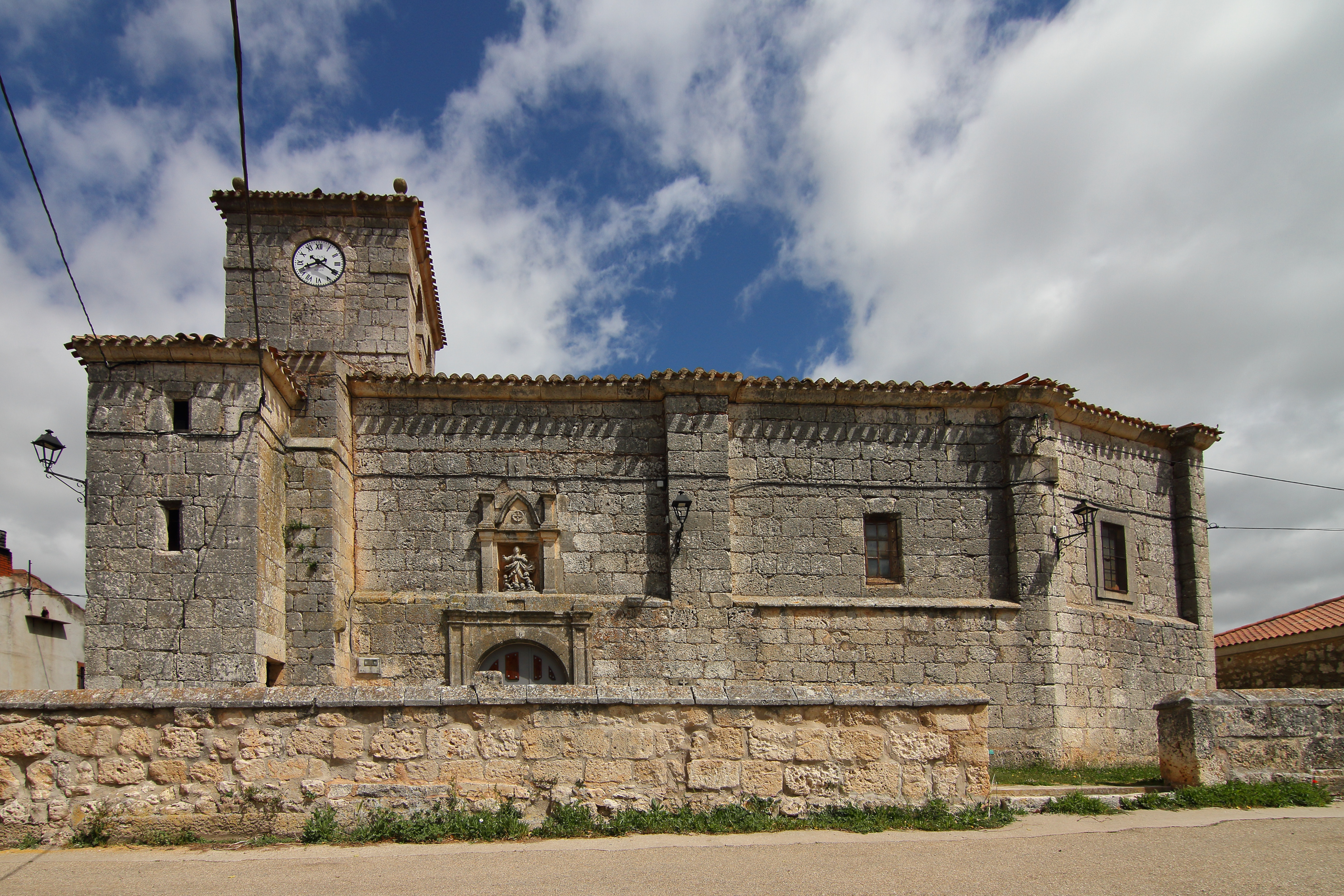
Church of the Assumption of Our Lady in Modúbar de la Emparedada
