= Los Ausines =

Coordinates: 42°19′N 03°19′W

- Municipality
- Coat of arms
- Interactive map of Los Ausines
- Country: Spain
- Autonomous community: Castile and León
- Province: Burgos
- Comarca: Alfoz de Burgos
- Seat: San Juan

Area
  - Total: 41 km^{2} (16 sq mi)
- Elevation: 908 m (2,979 ft)

Population (2025-01-01)
  - Total: 143
  - Density: 3.5/km^{2} (9.0/sq mi)
- Time zone: UTC+1 (CET)
  - Summer (DST): UTC+2 (CEST)
- Postal code: 09194
- Website: www.losausines.es

Los Ausines is a municipality located in the province of Burgos, Castile and León, Spain. According to the 2004 census (INE), the municipality has a population of 136 inhabitants.

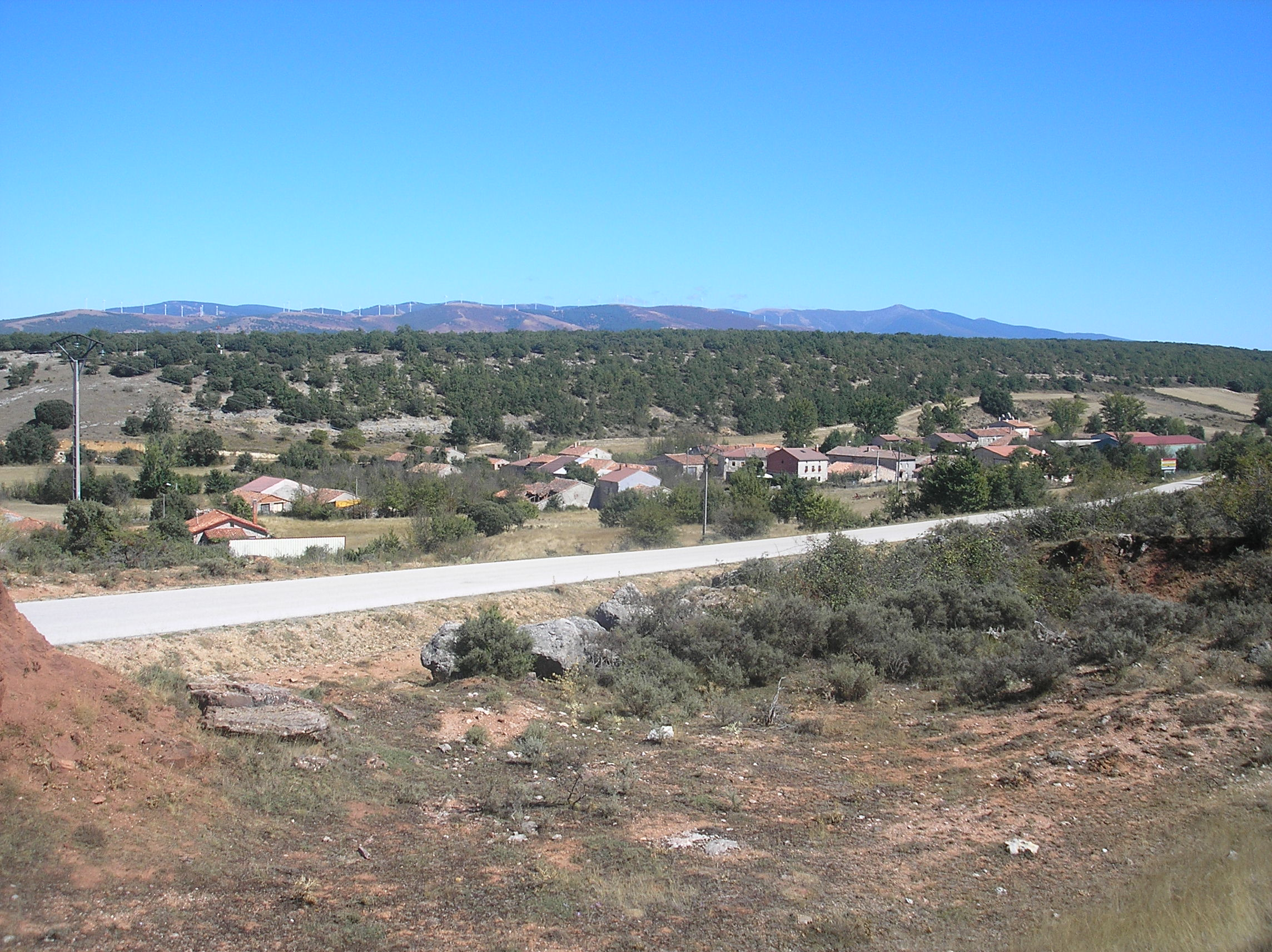
Cubillo del César, a hamlet in the Ausines municipality
