= San Adrián de Juarros =

Coordinates: 42°16′N 3°28′W

- Municipality and town
- Flag Coat of arms
- Interactive map of San Adrián de Juarros
- Country: Spain
- Autonomous community: Castile and León
- Province: Burgos
- Comarca: Alfoz de Burgos

Area
  - Total: 20 km^{2} (7.7 sq mi)
- Elevation: 1,055 m (3,461 ft)

Population (2025-01-01)
  - Total: 84
  - Density: 4.2/km^{2} (11/sq mi)
- Time zone: UTC+1 (CET)
  - Summer (DST): UTC+2 (CEST)
- Postal code: 09198
- Website: http://www.sanadriandejuarros.es/

San Adrián de Juarros is a municipality and town located in the province of Burgos, Castile and León, Spain. According to the 2004 census (INE), the municipality has a population of 52 inhabitants.

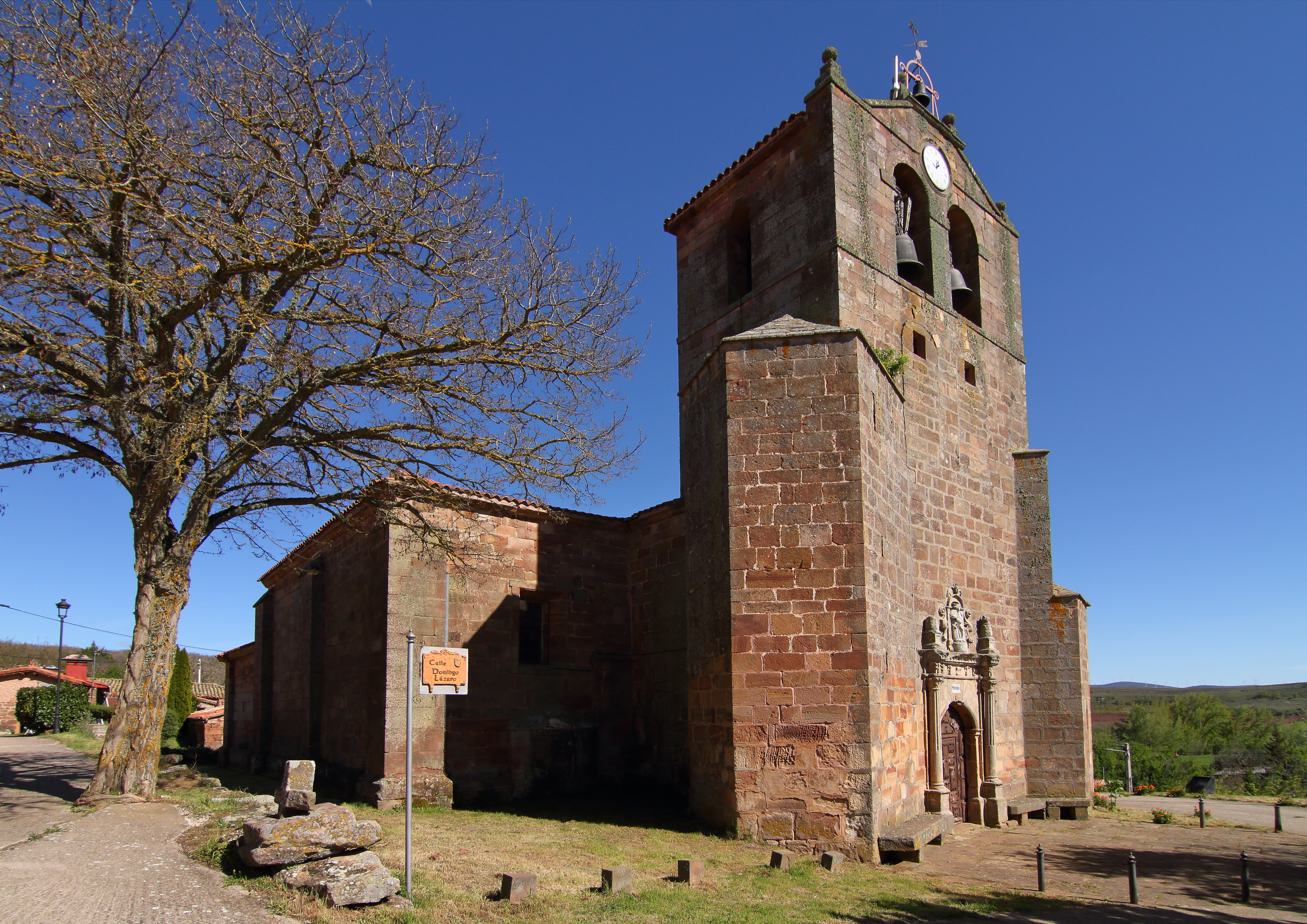
Church of the Assumption in San Adrián de Juarros
