= Hurones =

Coordinates: 42°24′N 3°37′W

- Municipality
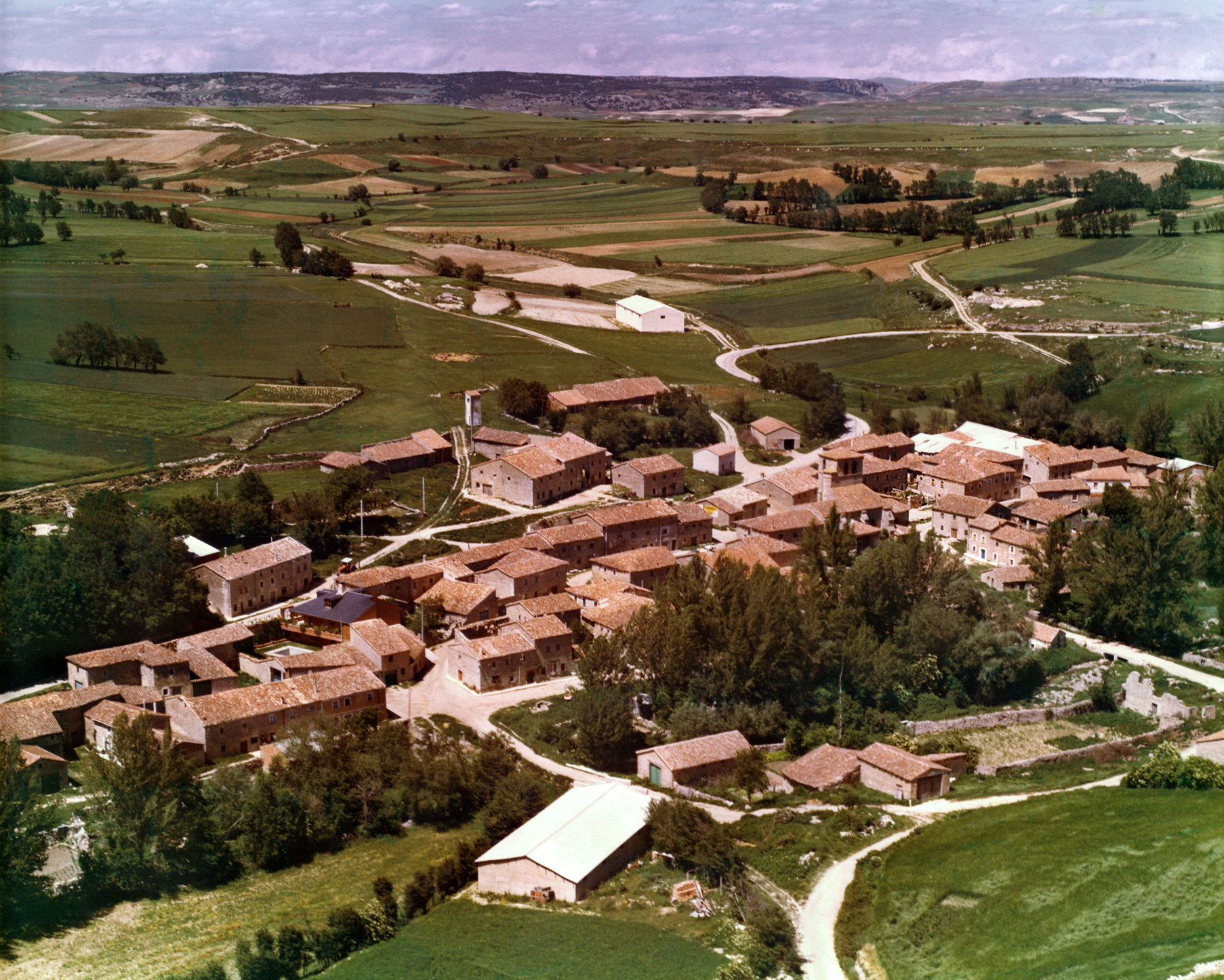
- View of Hurones, 1985
- Interactive map of Hurones
- Country: Spain
- Autonomous community: Castile and León
- Province: Burgos
- Comarca: Alfoz de Burgos

Area
  - Total: 8 km^{2} (3.1 sq mi)
- Elevation: 912 m (2,992 ft)

Population (2025-01-01)
  - Total: 59
  - Density: 7.4/km^{2} (19/sq mi)
- Time zone: UTC+1 (CET)
  - Summer (DST): UTC+2 (CEST)
- Postal code: 09191
- Website: http://www.hurones.es/

Hurones is a municipality located in the province of Burgos, Castile and León, Spain. According to the 2004 census (INE), the municipality has a population of 70 inhabitants.
