= Fresno de Rodilla =

Coordinates: 42°25′N 3°29′W

- Municipality
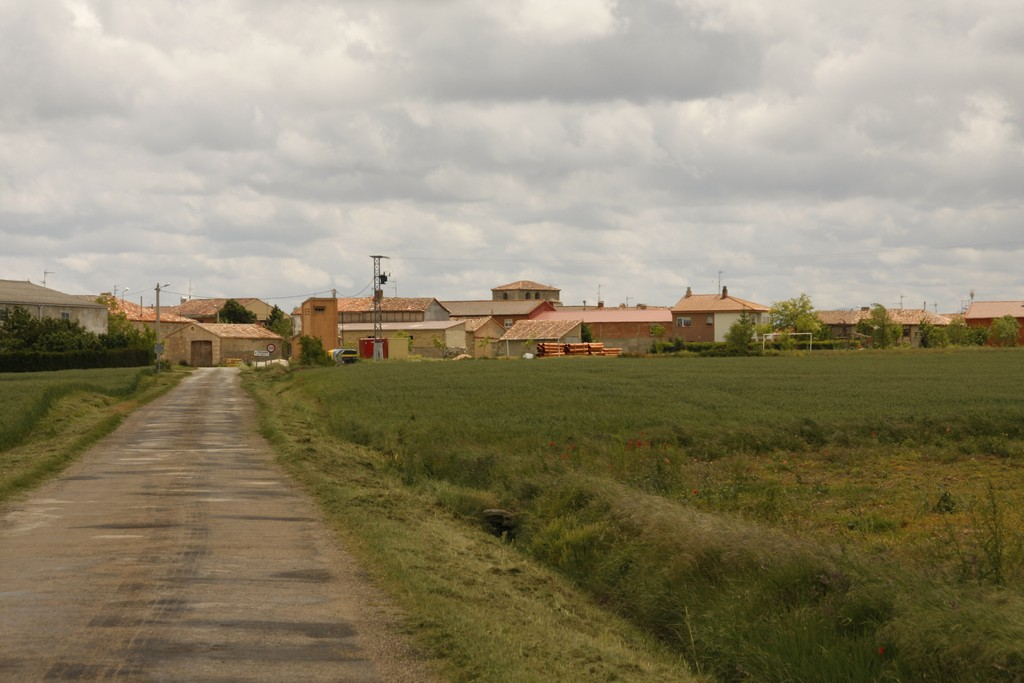
- View of Fresno de Rodilla, 2010

- Coat of arms

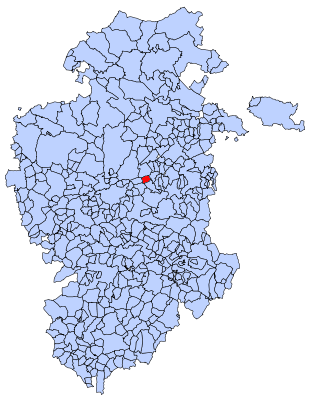
- Municipal location of Fresno de Rodilla in Burgos province
- Country: Spain
- Autonomous community: Castile and León
- Province: Burgos
- Comarca: Alfoz de Burgos

Area
  - Total: 12 km^{2} (4.6 sq mi)
- Elevation: 977 m (3,205 ft)

Population (2025-01-01)
  - Total: 49
  - Density: 4.1/km^{2} (11/sq mi)
- Time zone: UTC+1 (CET)
  - Summer (DST): UTC+2 (CEST)
- Postal code: 09290
- Website: http://www.fresnoderodilla.es/

Fresno de Rodilla is a municipality located in the province of Burgos, Castile and León, Spain. According to the 2004 census (INE), the municipality has a population of 46 inhabitants.
