= Frandovínez =

Coordinates: 42°18′N 3°50′W

- Municipality and town
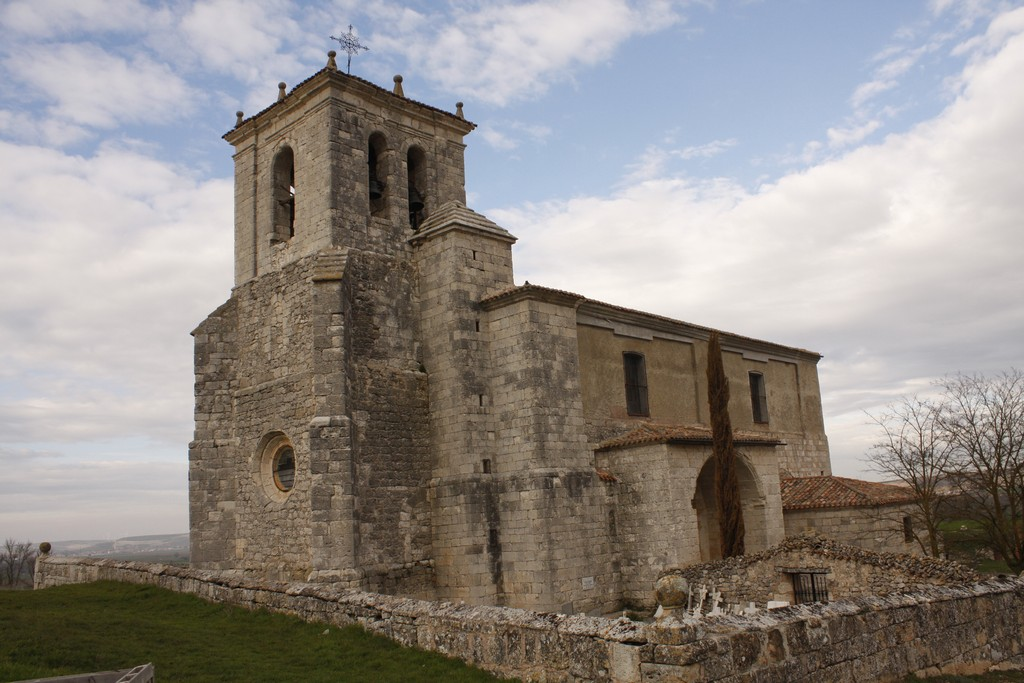
- San Miguel Arcángel church (16th-19th century)

- Flag Coat of arms
- Interactive map of Frandovínez
- Country: Spain
- Autonomous community: Castile and León
- Province: Burgos
- Comarca: Alfoz de Burgos

Area
  - Total: 8.58 km^{2} (3.31 sq mi)
- Elevation: 830 m (2,720 ft)

Population (2025-01-01)
  - Total: 95
  - Density: 11/km^{2} (29/sq mi)
- Time zone: UTC+1 (CET)
  - Summer (DST): UTC+2 (CEST)
- Postal code: 09230
- Website: http://www.frandovinez.es/

Frandovínez is a municipality located in the province of Burgos, Castile and León, Spain. According to the 2004 census (INE), the municipality has a population of 92 inhabitants.
