= Cayuela =

Coordinates: 42°16′N 3°49′W

- Municipality
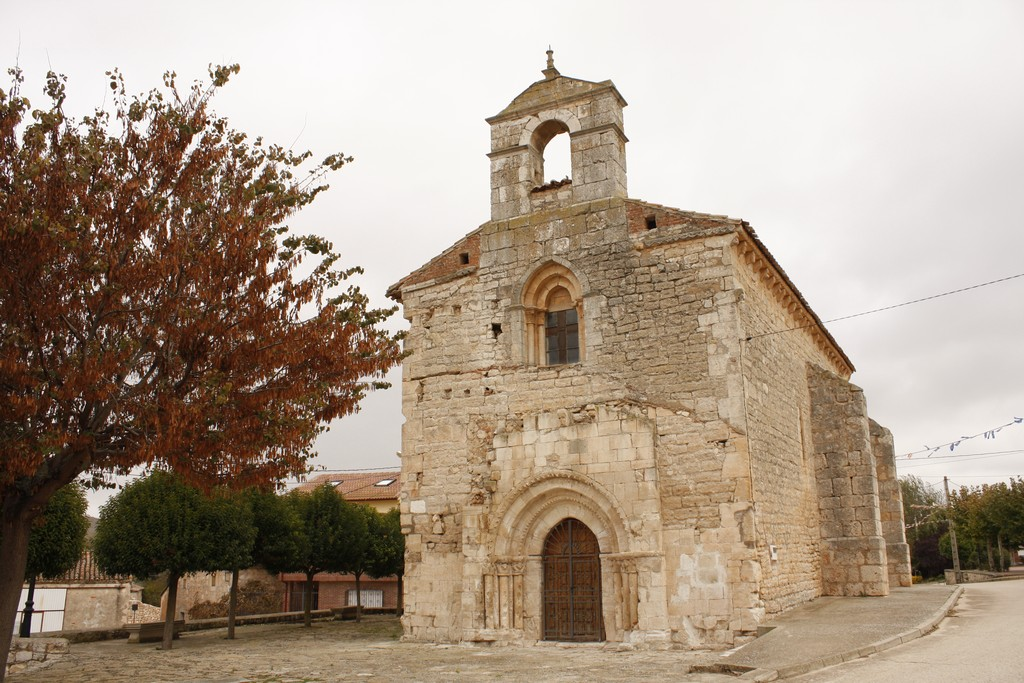
- San Esteban church (12th century)

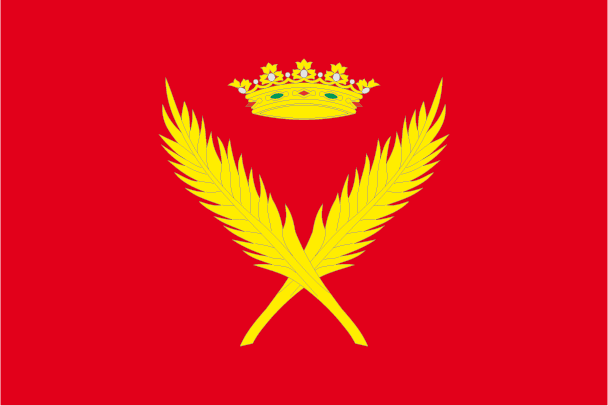
- Flag Coat of arms
- Interactive map of Cayuela
- Country: Spain
- Autonomous community: Castile and León
- Province: Burgos
- Comarca: Alfoz de Burgos

Area
  - Total: 13 km^{2} (5.0 sq mi)
- Elevation: 823 m (2,700 ft)

Population (2025-01-01)
  - Total: 186
  - Density: 14/km^{2} (37/sq mi)
- Time zone: UTC+1 (CET)
  - Summer (DST): UTC+2 (CEST)
- Postal code: 09239
- Website: https://web.archive.org/web/20130607175729/http://www.cayuela.es/

Cayuela is a municipality located in the province of Burgos, Castile and León, Spain. According to the 2004 census (INE), the municipality has a population of 130 inhabitants.
