= Santa María del Invierno =

Coordinates: 42°27′N 3°26′W

- Municipality and town
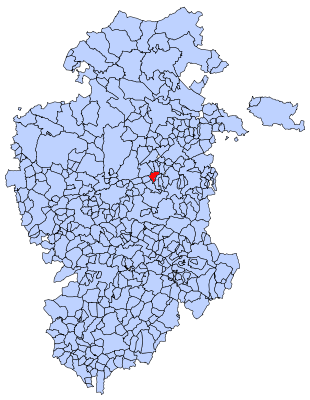
- Municipal location of Santa María del Invierno in Burgos province
- Country: Spain
- Autonomous community: Castile and León
- Province: Burgos
- Comarca: Alfoz de Burgos

Area
  - Total: 16.18 km^{2} (6.25 sq mi)
- Elevation: 854 m (2,802 ft)

Population (2025-01-01)
  - Total: 70
  - Density: 4.3/km^{2} (11/sq mi)
- Time zone: UTC+1 (CET)
  - Summer (DST): UTC+2 (CEST)
- Postal code: 09292
- Website: http://www.santamariadelinvierno.es/

Santa María del Invierno is a municipality and town located in the province of Burgos, Castile and León, Spain. According to the 2004 census (INE), the municipality has a population of 69 inhabitants.
