= Torrelara =

Coordinates: 42°10′N 3°31′W

- Municipality and town
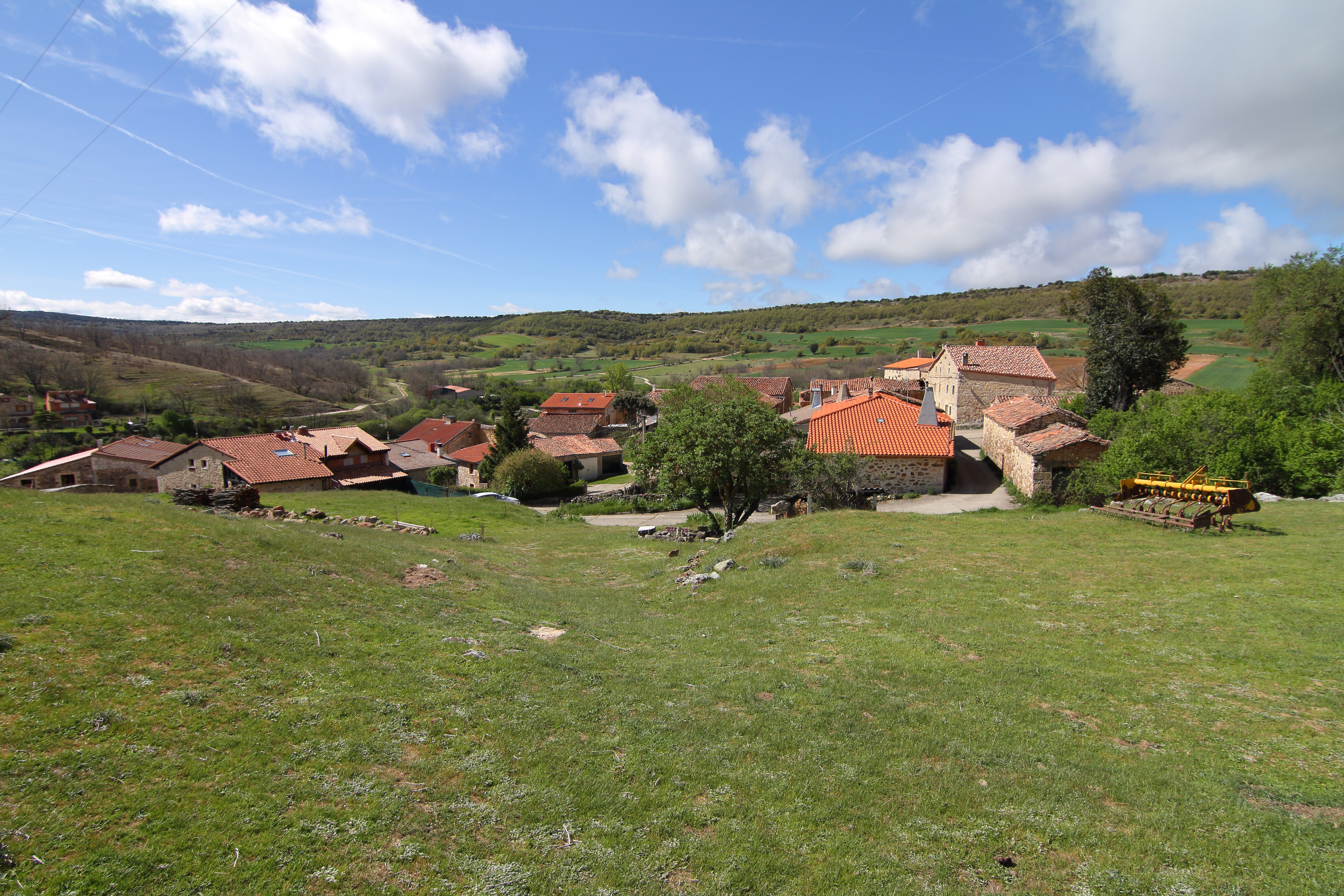
- View of Torrelara from the church of Torrelara
- Interactive map of Torrelara
- Country: Spain
- Autonomous community: Castile and León
- Province: Burgos
- Comarca: Alfoz de Burgos

Area
  - Total: 12 km^{2} (4.6 sq mi)

Population (2025-01-01)
  - Total: 34
  - Density: 2.8/km^{2} (7.3/sq mi)
- Time zone: UTC+1 (CET)
  - Summer (DST): UTC+2 (CEST)
- Postal code: 09194
- Website: http://www.torrelara.es/

Torrelara is a municipality and town located in the province of Burgos, Castile and León, Spain. According to the 2004 census (INE), the municipality has a population of 26 inhabitants.
