= Cardeñadijo =

Coordinates: 42°18′N 3°40′W

- Municipality and town
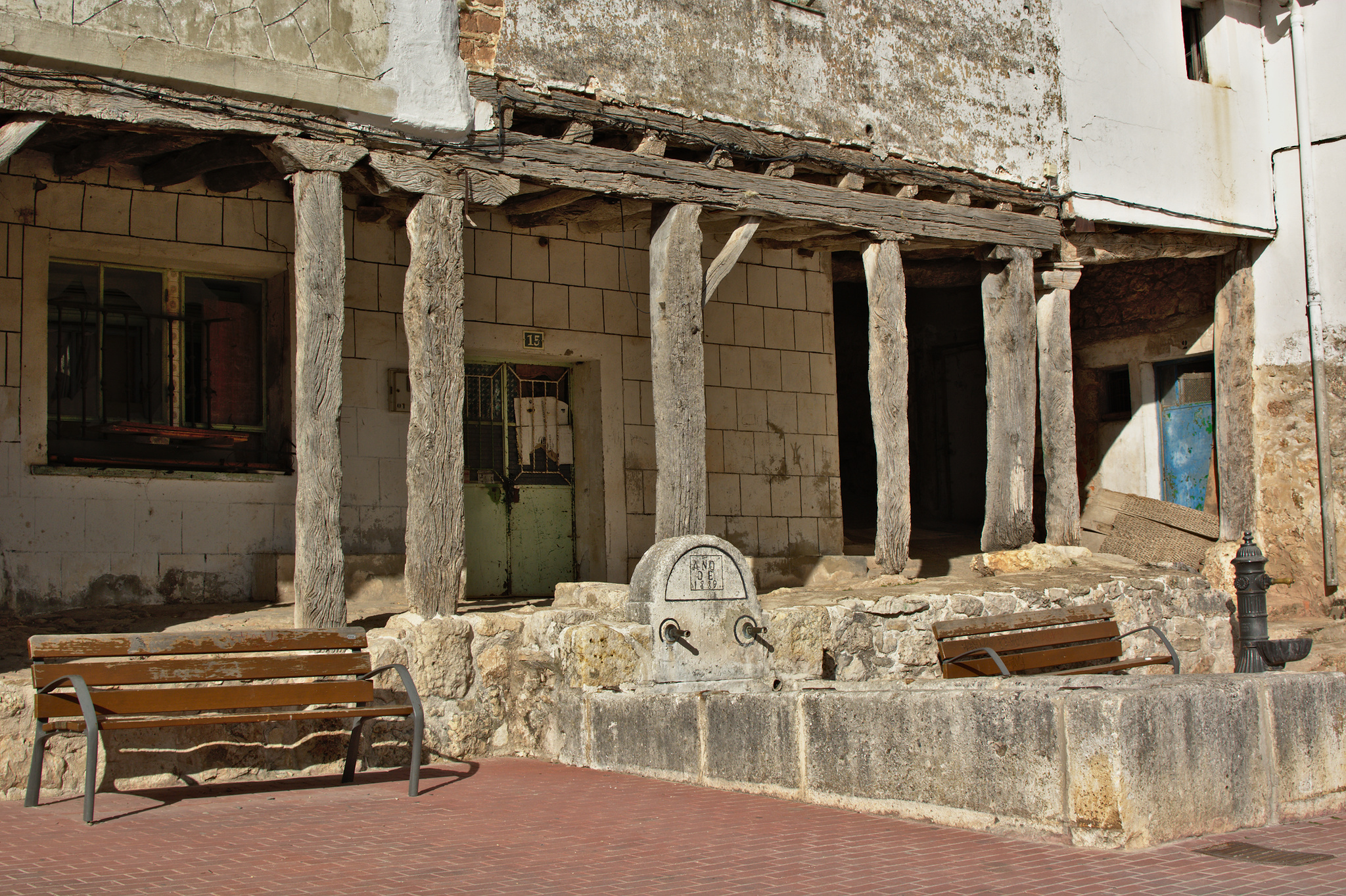
- Trough in Cardeñalijo

- Coat of arms
- Interactive map of Cardeñadijo
- Country: Spain
- Autonomous community: Castile and León
- Province: Burgos
- Comarca: Alfoz de Burgos
- Founded: 9th century

Area
  - Total: 9 km^{2} (3.5 sq mi)
- Elevation: 920 m (3,020 ft)

Population (2025-01-01)
  - Total: 1,445
  - Density: 160/km^{2} (420/sq mi)
- Time zone: UTC+1 (CET)
  - Summer (DST): UTC+2 (CEST)
- Postal code: 09194

Cardeñadijo is a municipality located in the province of Burgos, Castile and León, Spain. According to the 2004 census (INE), the municipality has a population of 668 inhabitants.
