= Carcedo de Burgos =

Coordinates: 42°17′N 3°37′W

- municipality
- Flag Coat of arms
- Interactive map of Carcedo de Burgos
- Country: Spain
- Autonomous community: Castile and León
- Province: Burgos
- Comarca: Alfoz de Burgos

Area
  - Total: 25.68 km^{2} (9.92 sq mi)
- Elevation: 990 m (3,250 ft)

Population (2025-01-01)
  - Total: 513
  - Density: 20.0/km^{2} (51.7/sq mi)
- Time zone: UTC+1 (CET)
  - Summer (DST): UTC+2 (CEST)
- Postal code: 09193
- Website: http://carcedodeburgos.burgos.es/

Carcedo de Burgos is a municipality located in the province of Burgos, Castile and León, Spain. According to the 2004 census (INE), the municipality has a population of 221 inhabitants.

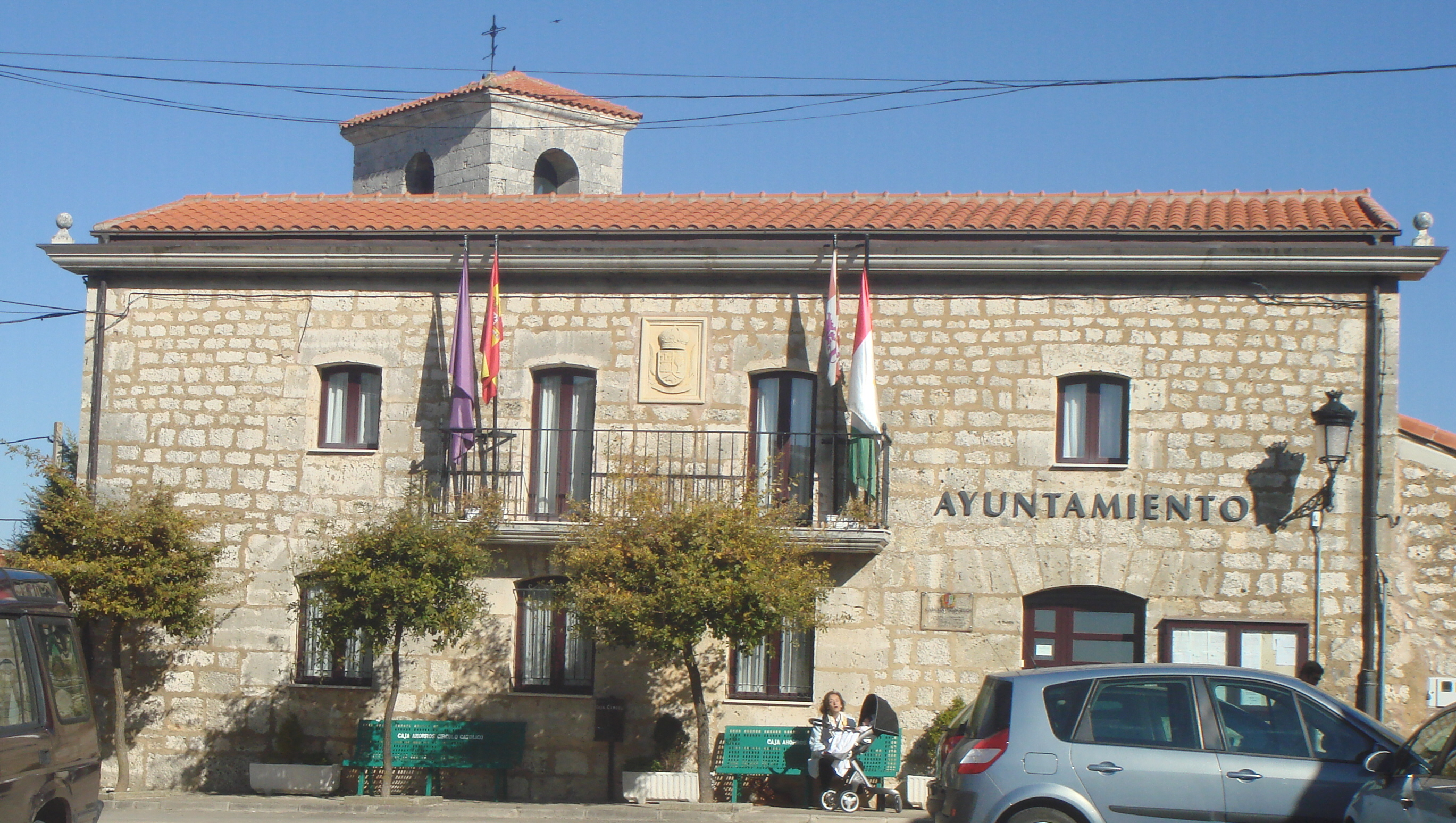
Ayuntamiento of Carcedo de Burgos.

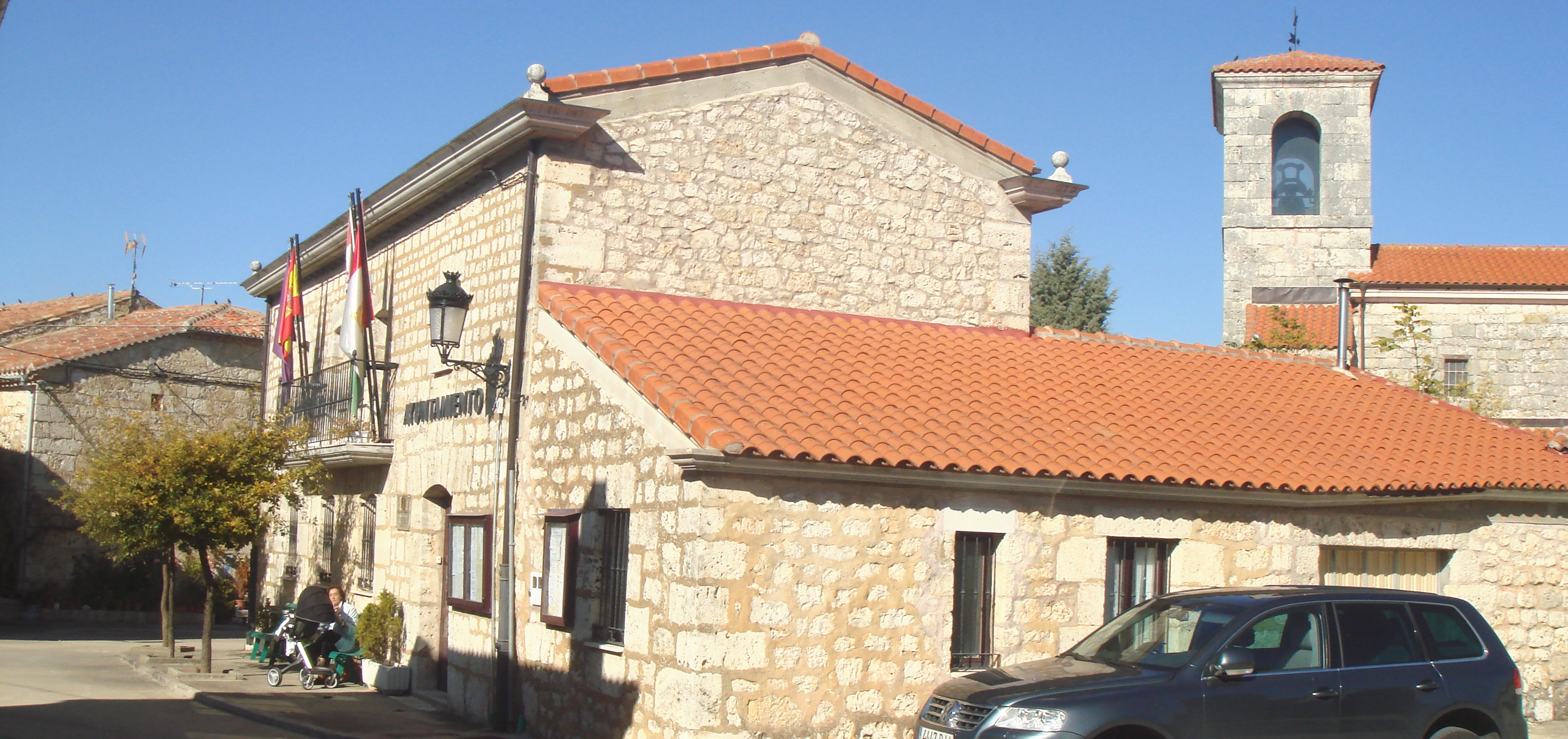
View of the ayuntamiento and church.

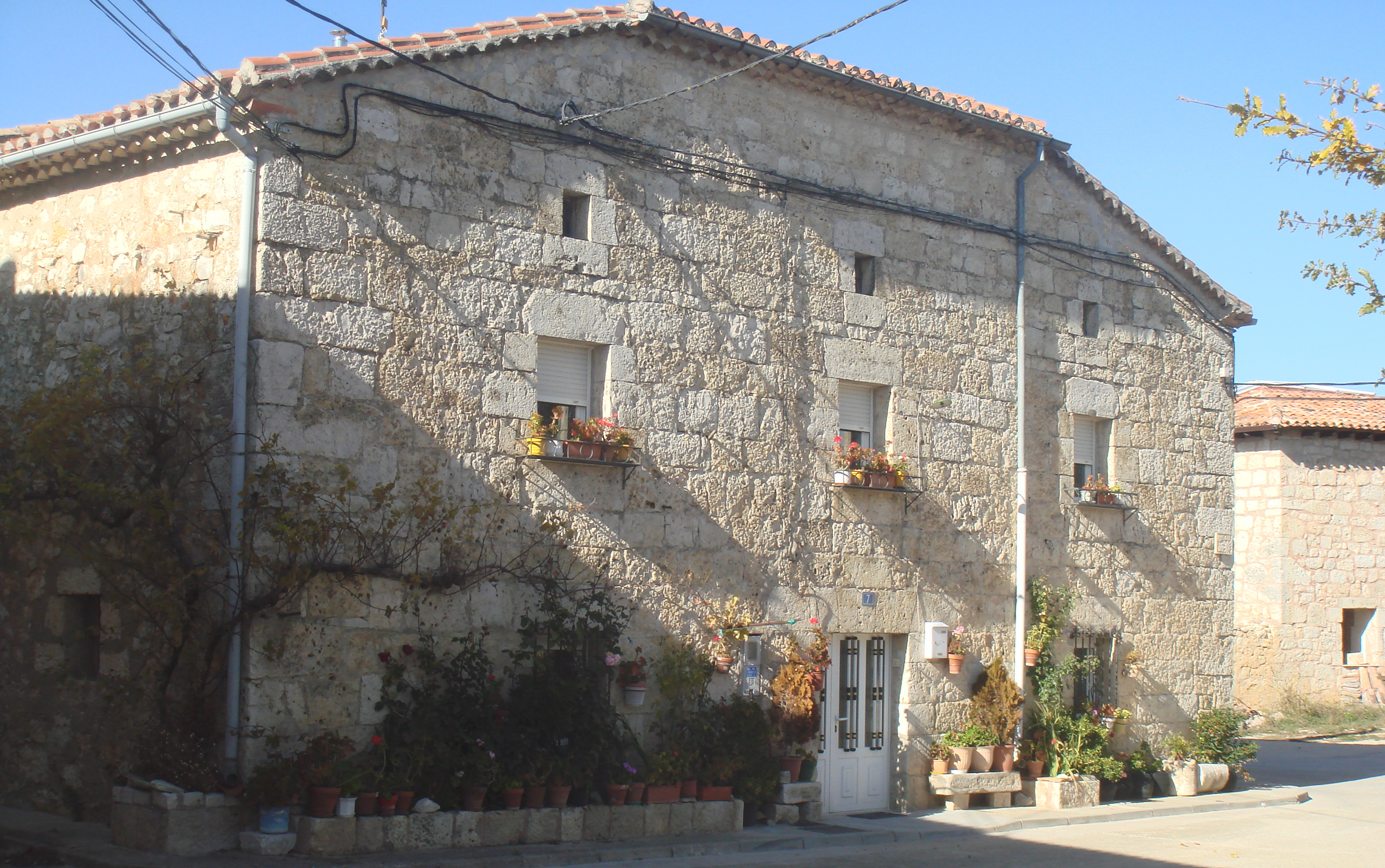
Typical house of this town.
