= Villamiel de la Sierra =

Coordinates: 42°11′N 3°25′W

- municipality
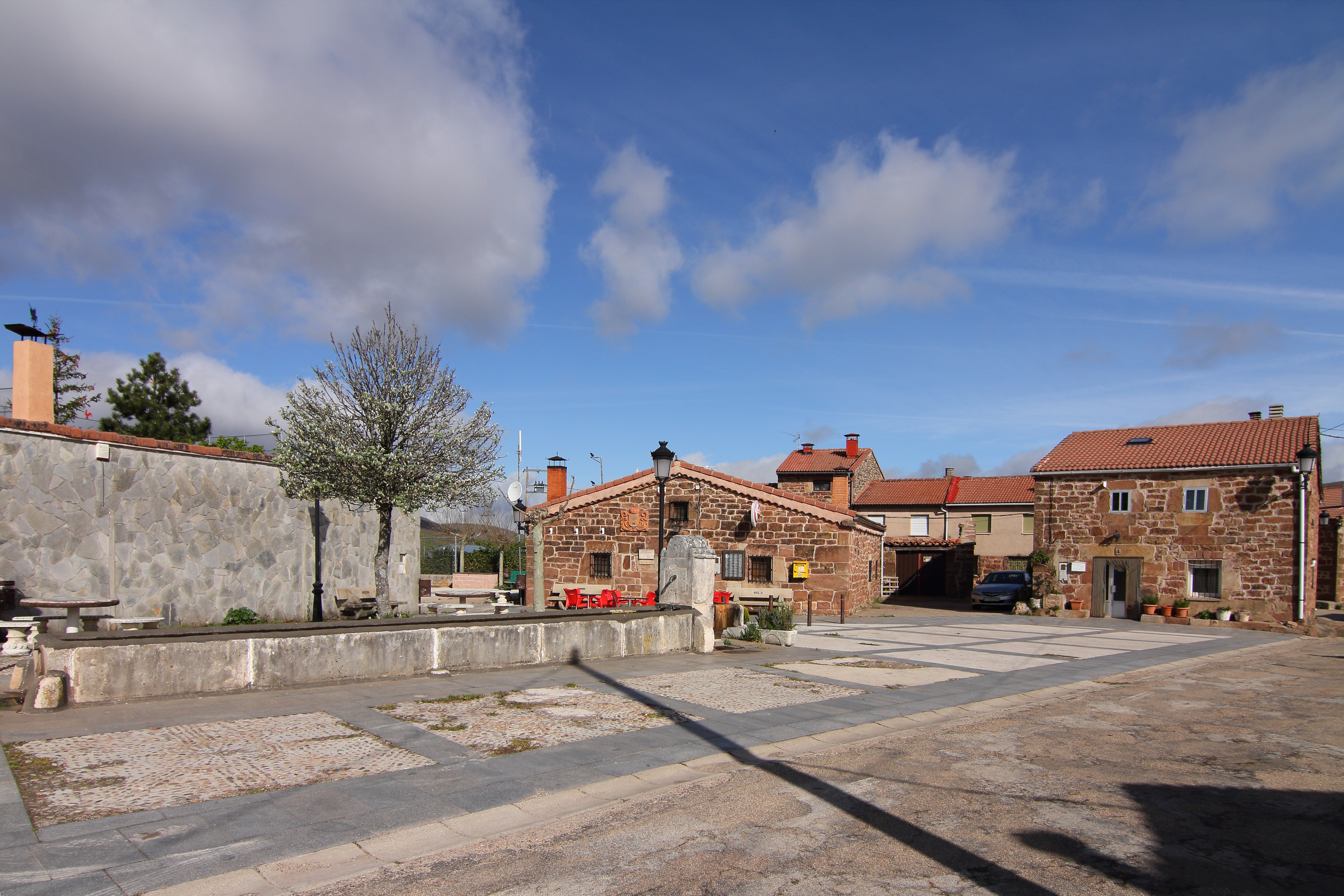
- Villamiel de la Sierra Town Hall

- Flag Coat of arms
- Interactive map of Villamiel de la Sierra
- Country: Spain
- Autonomous community: Castile and León
- Province: Burgos

Area
  - Total: 17 km^{2} (6.6 sq mi)

Population (2025-01-01)
  - Total: 43
  - Density: 2.5/km^{2} (6.6/sq mi)
- Time zone: UTC+1 (CET)
  - Summer (DST): UTC+2 (CEST)

Villamiel de la Sierra is a municipality located in the province of Burgos, Castile and León, Spain. According to the 2004 census (INE), the municipality has a population of 38 inhabitants.
