= Villariezo =

Coordinates: 42°16′N 3°44′W

- municipality
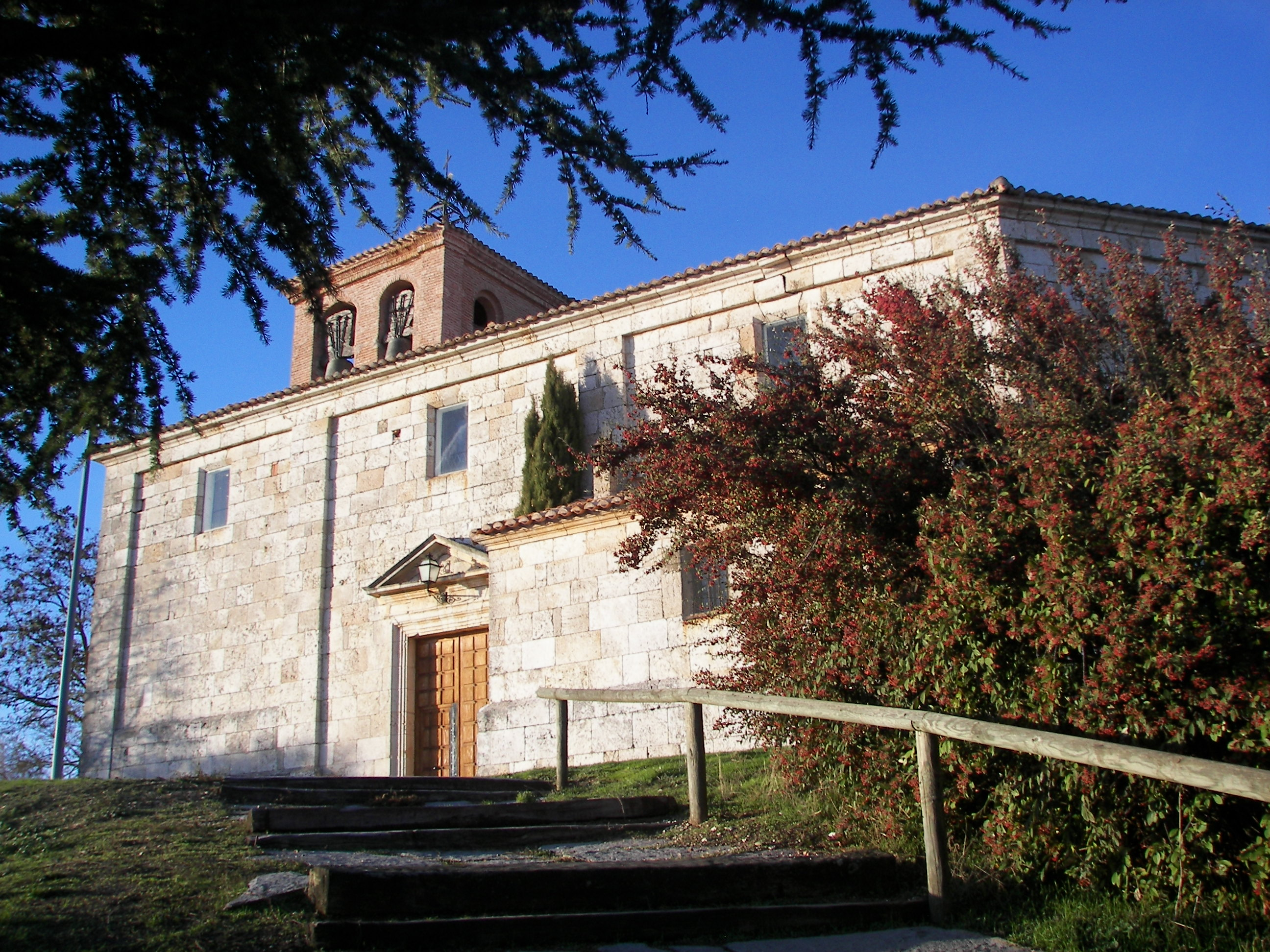
- Church of San Pedro Cátedra in Villariezo

- Coat of arms
- Interactive map of Villariezo
- Country: Spain
- Autonomous community: Castile and León
- Province: Burgos

Government
  - Mayor: Juan José Martínez Santamaria (PSOE)

Area
  - Total: 10.29 km^{2} (3.97 sq mi)
- Elevation: 879 m (2,884 ft)

Population (2025-01-01)
  - Total: 731
  - Density: 61.32/km^{2} (158.8/sq mi)
- Time zone: UTC+1 (CET)
  - Summer (DST): UTC+2 (CEST)

Villariezo is a municipality located in the province of Burgos, Castile and León, Spain. According to the 2023 census (INE), the municipality has a population of 719 inhabitants.
