= Isar, Province of Burgos =

Coordinates: 42°22′N 3°56′W

Isar
- Municipality and town
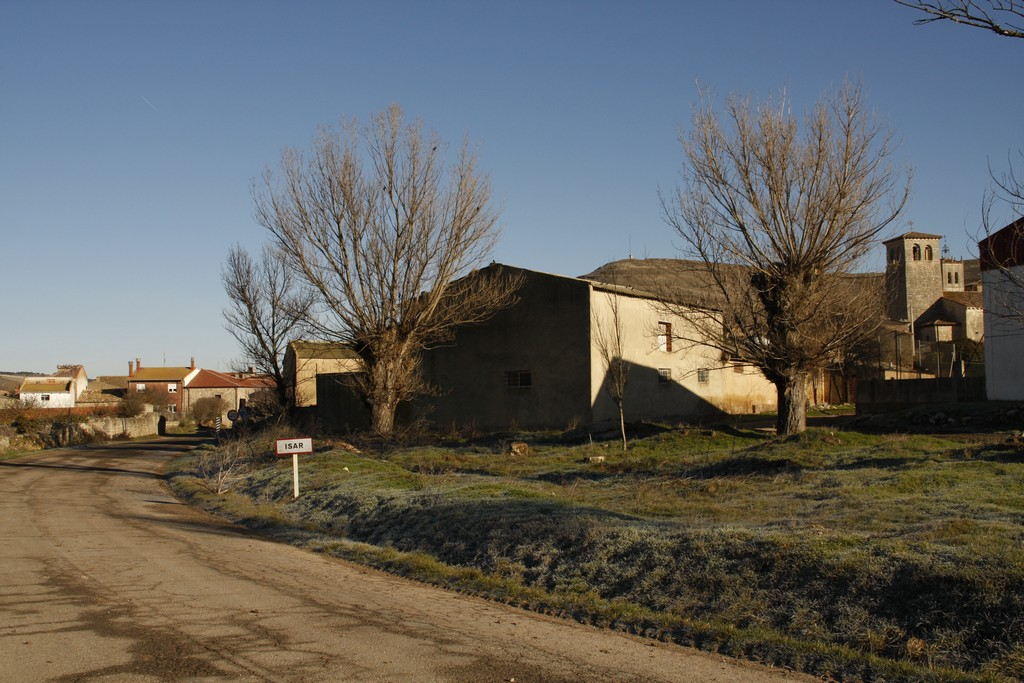
- View of Isar, 2010

- Flag Coat of arms
- Interactive map of Isar
- Country: Spain
- Autonomous community: Castile and León
- Province: Burgos
- Comarca: Odra-Pisuerga

Area
  - Total: 66 km^{2} (25 sq mi)
- Elevation: 849 m (2,785 ft)

Population (2025-01-01)
  - Total: 279
  - Density: 4.2/km^{2} (11/sq mi)
- Time zone: UTC+1 (CET)
  - Summer (DST): UTC+2 (CEST)
- Postal code: 09653
- Website: http://www.isar.es/

Isar is a municipality located in the province of Burgos, Castile and León, Spain.
