= Valle de las Navas =

Coordinates: 41.65°N 3.5°W

- municipality
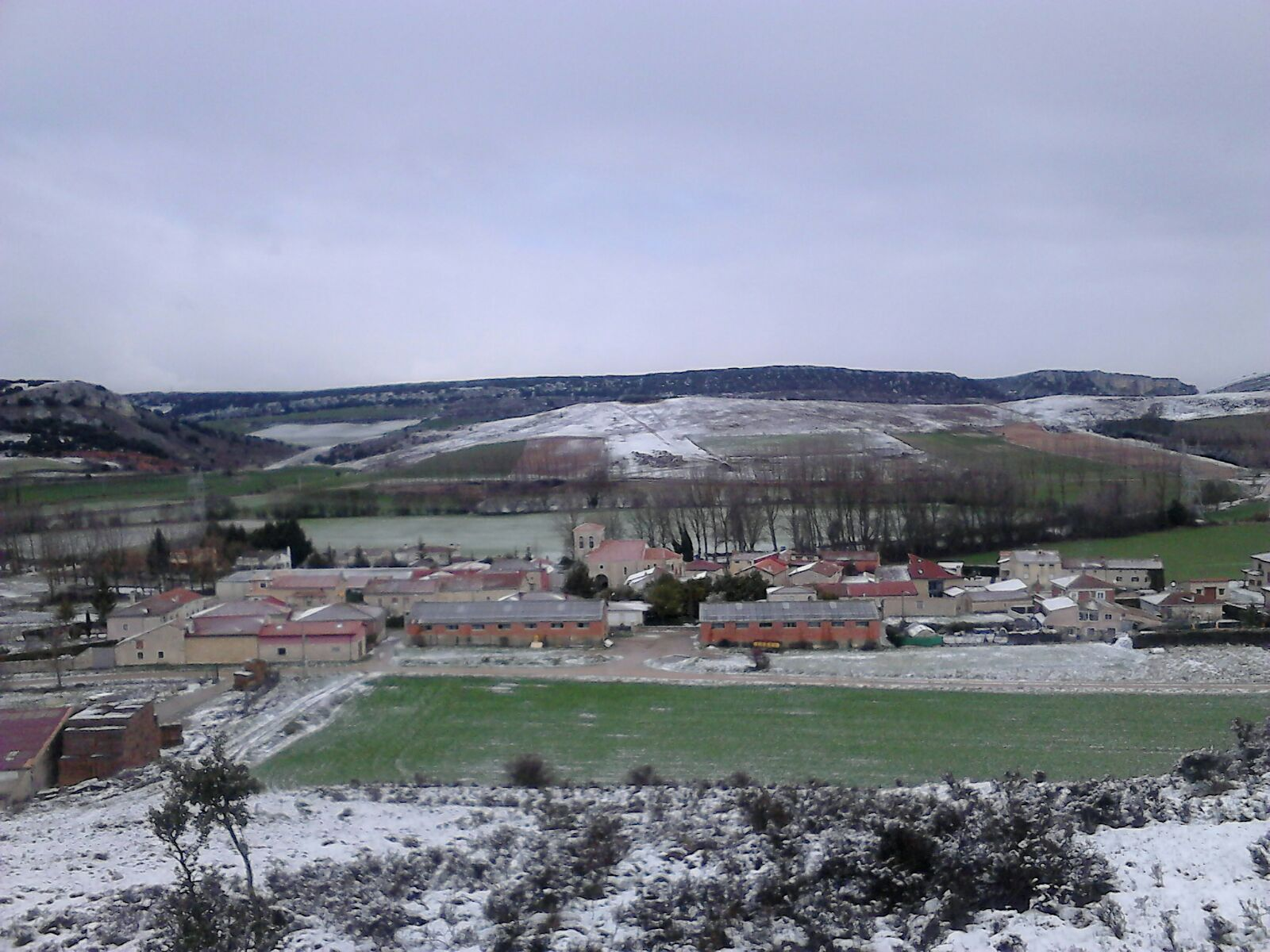
- Panoramic view of Valle de las Navas
- Interactive map of Valle de las Navas
- Country: Spain
- Autonomous community: Castile and León
- Province: Burgos

Area
  - Total: 111 km^{2} (43 sq mi)

Population (2025-01-01)
  - Total: 549
  - Density: 4.95/km^{2} (12.8/sq mi)
- Time zone: UTC+1 (CET)
  - Summer (DST): UTC+2 (CEST)

Valle de las Navas is a municipality located in the province of Burgos, Castile and León, Spain. According to the 2004 census (INE), the municipality has a population of 620 inhabitants.
