= Villanueva de Gumiel =

Coordinates: 41°44′N 3°37′W

- municipality
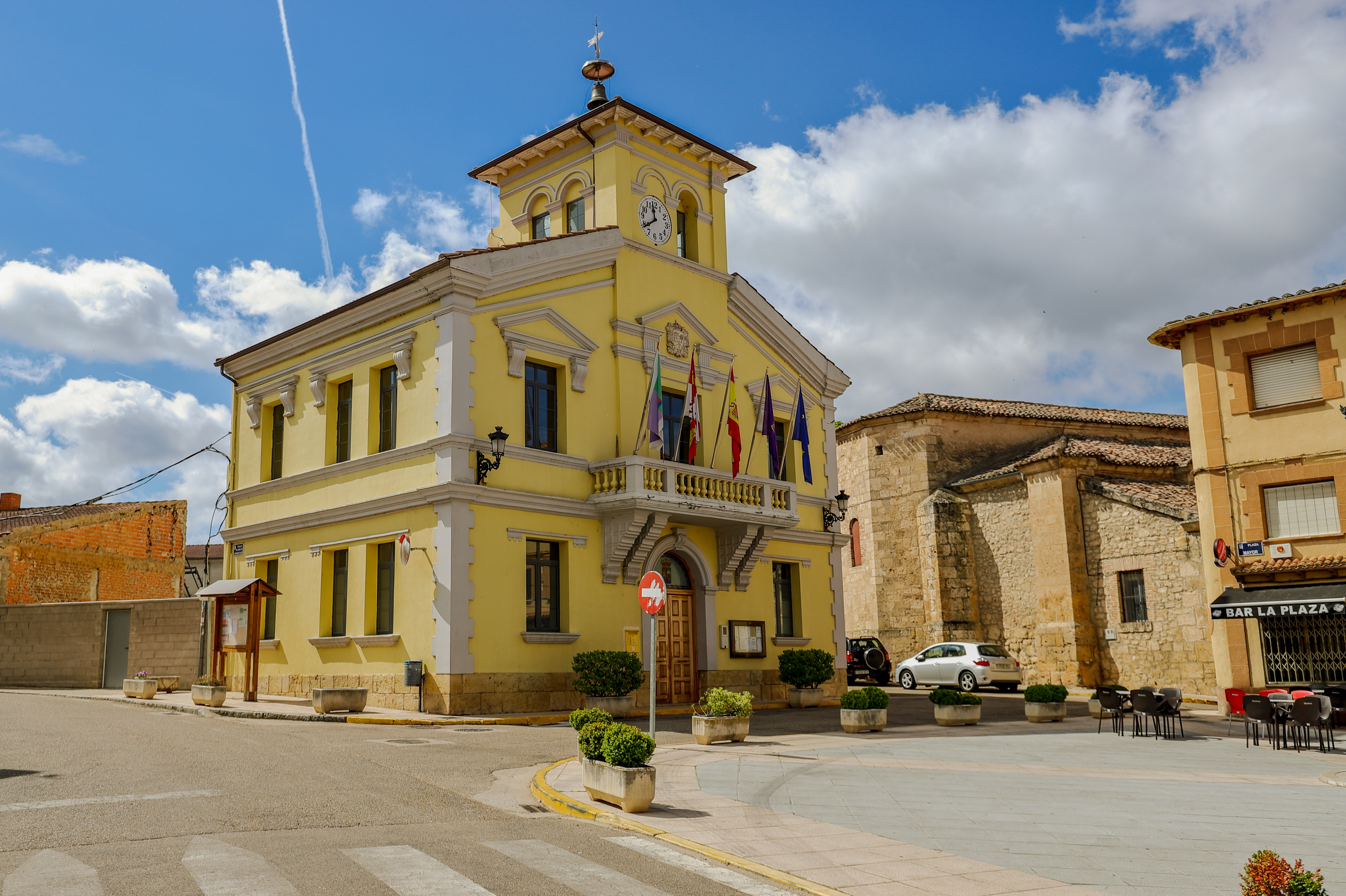
- Villanueva de Gumiel Town Hall Square

- Flag Coat of arms
- Interactive map of Villanueva de Gumiel
- Country: Spain
- Autonomous community: Castile and León
- Province: Burgos

Area
  - Total: 22 km^{2} (8.5 sq mi)

Population (2025-01-01)
  - Total: 281
  - Density: 13/km^{2} (33/sq mi)
- Time zone: UTC+1 (CET)
  - Summer (DST): UTC+2 (CEST)

Villanueva de Gumiel is a municipality located in the province of Burgos, Castile and León, Spain. According to the 2004 census (INE), the municipality has a population of 288 inhabitants.
