= Burgos =

- Municipality
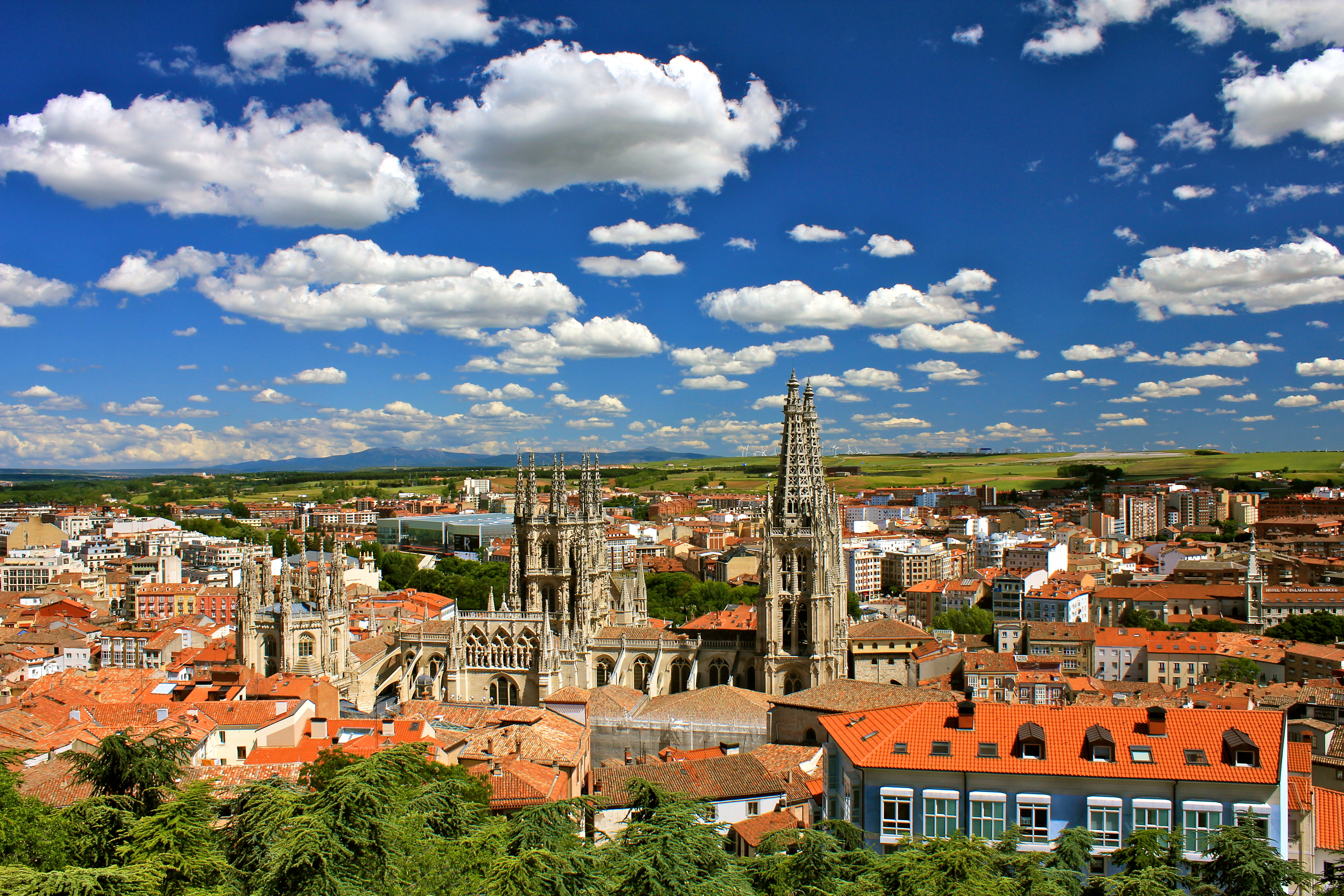
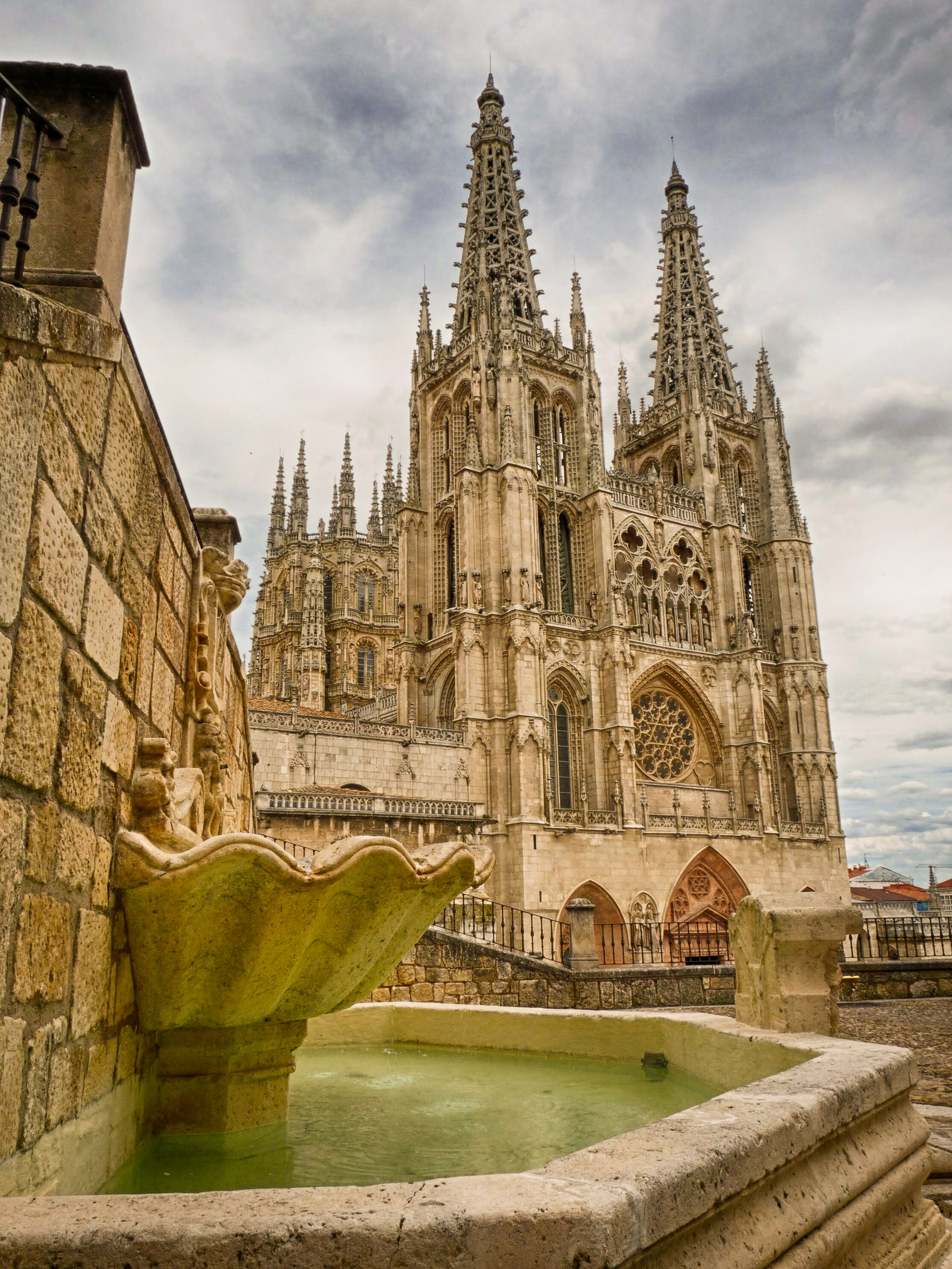
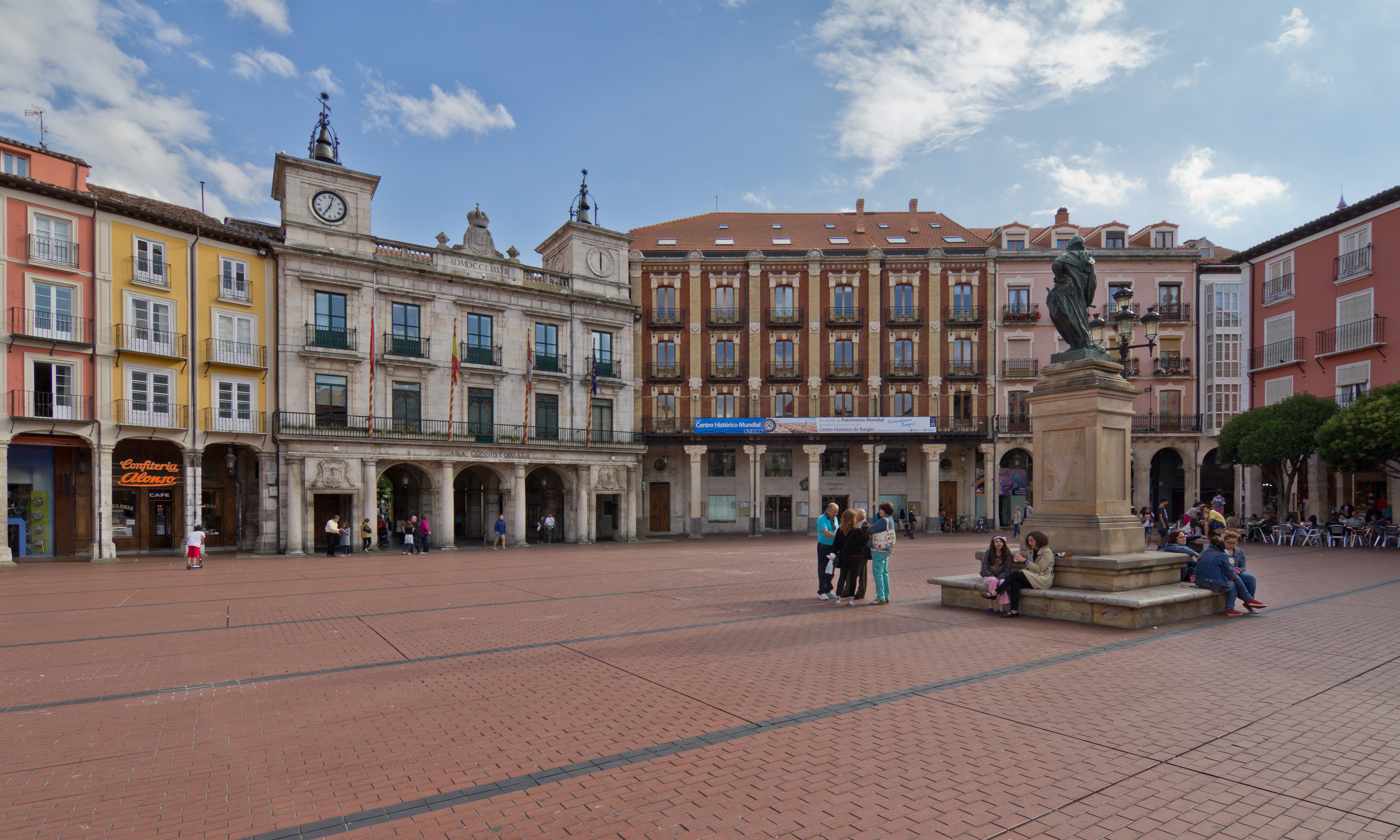
- View of Burgos Cathedral Plaza Mayor

- Flag Coat of arms
- Motto: Caput Castellae, camera regia, prima voce et fide Cabeza de Castilla, cámara real, primera en voz y fidelidad ("Head of Castile, royal chamber, first in voice and fidelity")
- Anthem: Himno a Burgos
- Interactive map of Burgos
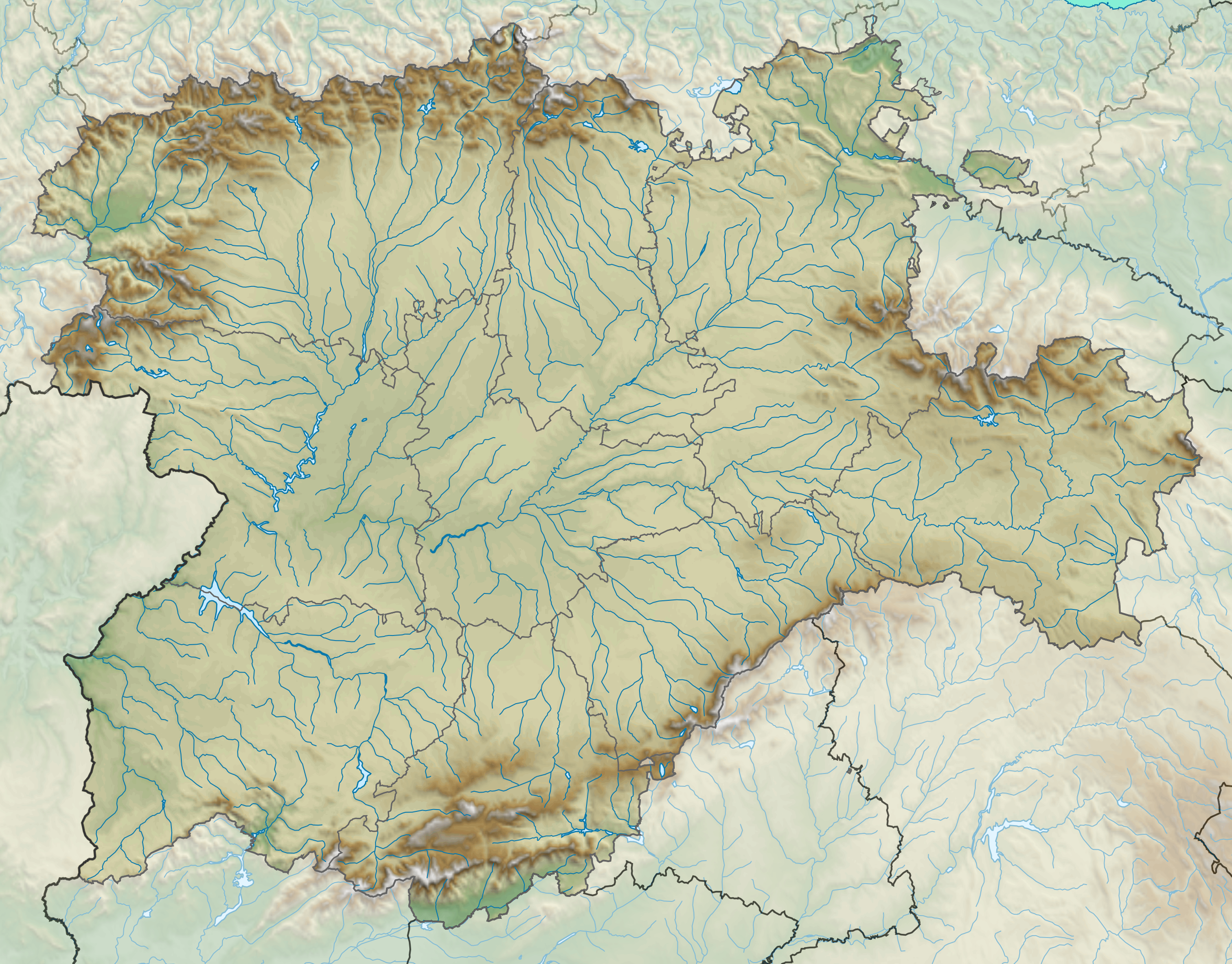
- Location within Castile and León Location within Spain
- Coordinates: 42°21′00″N 3°42′24″W
- Country: Spain
- Autonomous community: Castile and León
- Province: Burgos
- Founded: 885
- Founder: Diego Rodríguez Porcelos

Government
  - Type: Ayuntamiento
  - Body: Ayuntamiento de Burgos
  - Mayor: Cristina Ayala (PP)

Area
  - Municipality: 107.06 km^{2} (41.34 sq mi)
- Elevation: 865 m (2,838 ft)

Population (2025)
  - Municipality: 178,370
  - Rank: 37th in Spain
  - Density: 1,666.1/km^{2} (4,315.1/sq mi)
  - Metro: 200,000
  - Metro density: 1.642/km^{2} (4.25/sq mi)
- Demonym: Burgalés/burgalesa
- Time zone: UTC+1 (CET)
  - Summer (DST): UTC+2 (CEST)
- Postal codes: 09001–09007
- Area code: 9059
- Website: www.aytoburgos.es

Burgos (Spanish: [ˈbuɾɣos]) is a city in the autonomous community of Castile and León in Spain. It is the capital city of the province of Burgos and, with a population of approximately 178,370, it is also the second most populated city in Castile and León.

Burgos is situated in the north of the Iberian Peninsula, near the confluence of the Arlanzón and the Vena rivers and at the edge of the central plateau.

Burgos was settled in 884 by Diego Rodríguez Porcelos, Count of Castile, on behalf of the Leonese monarch. In the 11th century, urban development increased with the installment of a diocese, while the arrival of Frankish foreign elements fostered economic activity. By the 13th century, Burgos had already become the most important trading hub in the north of the Kingdom of Castile, influenced for its strategic location both along the Way of St. James and along north-south trade networks connecting the Castilian hinterland with the emerging Cantabrian port towns. Burgos experienced a long decline from the 17th century onwards.

Burgos became the headquarters of the Francoist proto-government (1936–1939) following the start of the Spanish Civil War. Declared in 1964 as Pole of Industrial Promotion and in 1969 as Pole of Industrial Development, the city has grown since then in terms of economic activity. At the regional level, Burgos forms part of an economic axis together with the cities of Valladolid and Palencia. In 2008, the international Burgos Airport started to service commercial flights.

The Museum of Human Evolution opened in Burgos in 2010. It features remains of the first hominids in Europe, who lived in the area 750,000–800,000 years ago. The Cathedral of Burgos is a World Heritage Site. Burgos was selected as the "Spanish Gastronomy Capital" of 2013. In 2015 UNESCO named it "City of Gastronomy", and it has been part of the Creative Cities Network since then.

== Etymology ==
There are several possible origins for the toponymy. When the city was founded, the inhabitants of the surrounding country moved into the fortified village, whose Visigothic name of Burgos signified consolidated walled villages (Gothic baurgs). Numerous cities containing the Germanic burg "city" such as Hamburg have a similar literal composition. The city began to be called Caput Castellae ("Cabeza de Castilla" or "Head of Castile").

== History ==
Early humans occupied sites around Burgos as early as 800,000 years ago. When the Romans took possession of what is now the province of Burgos, the site had been a Celtic city. In Roman times, it belonged to Hispania Citerior ("Hither Spain") and then to Hispania Tarraconensis. In the 5th century, the Visigoths drove back the Suebi, then the Berbers occupied almost all of Castile in the 8th century, although only for a very brief period, leaving little if any trace of their occupation. Alfonso III of Asturias conquered it about the middle of the 9th century, and built several castles, which was then extended through the reconquest of lost territory. The region came to be known as Castile from Latin castella "(land of) castles".

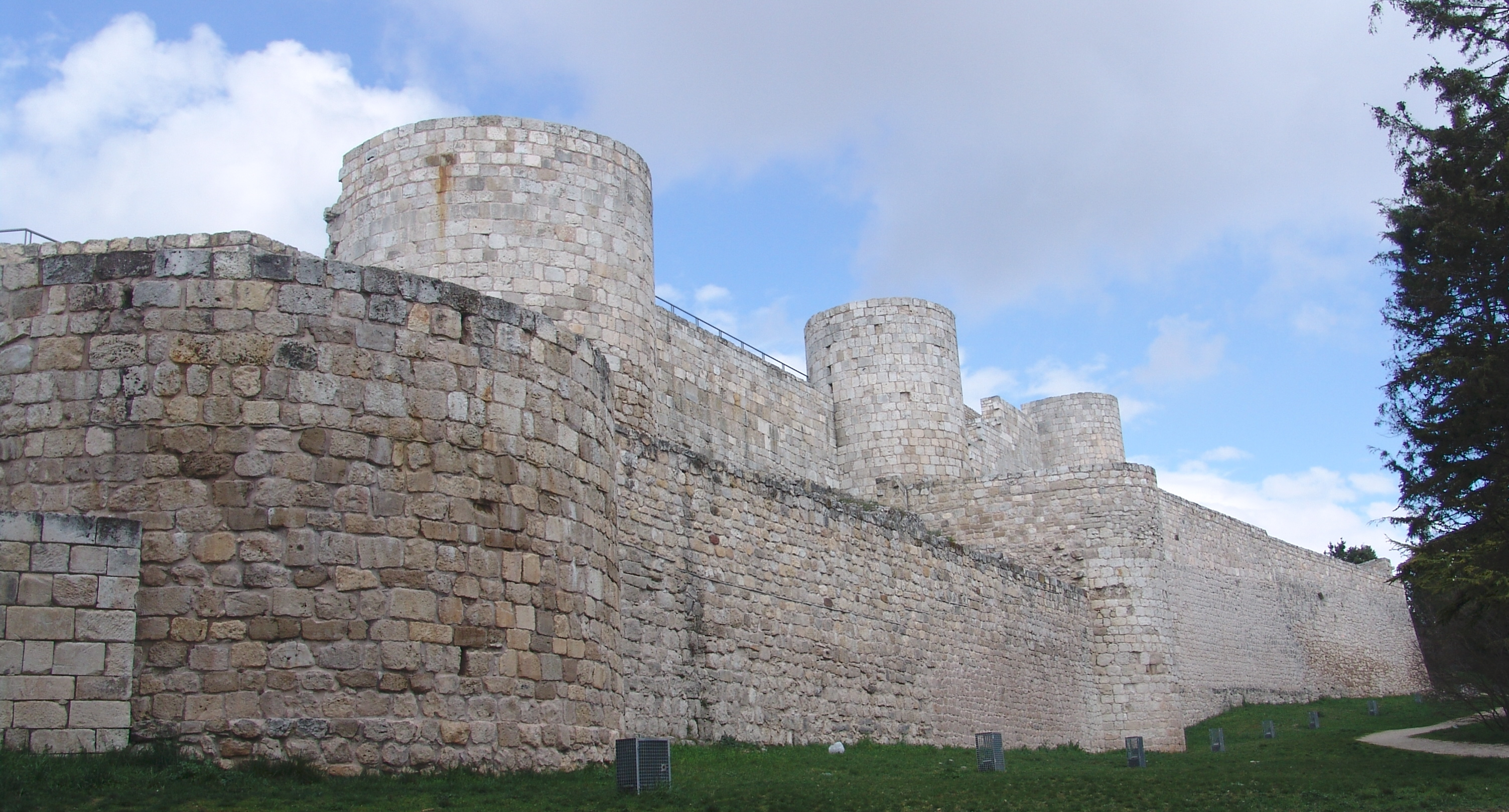
Ruins of the Castle of Burgos, of possible Visigothic origin

Burgos was founded in 884 as an outpost of this expanding Christian frontier, When Diego Rodríguez "Porcelos", Count of Castile, governed this territory with orders to promote the increase of the Christian population, he gathered the inhabitants of the surrounding country into one fortified village. The city began to be called Caput Castellae (Cabeza de Castilla 'Head of Castile'). The County of Castile, subject to the Kingdom of León, continued to be governed by counts and was gradually extended; Fernán González of Castile was the first independent count of Castile.

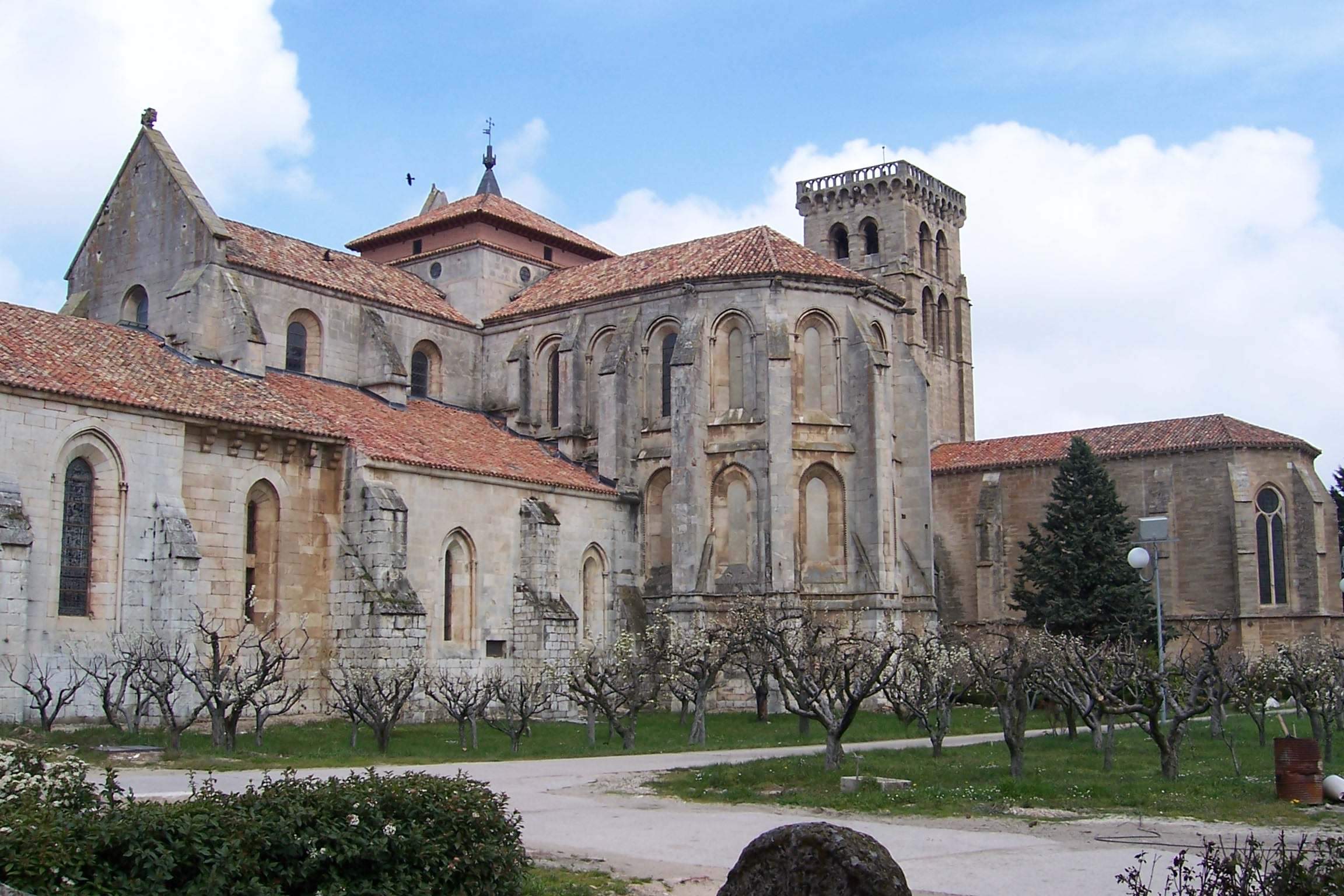
Abbey of Santa María la Real de Las Huelgas, founded in 1180

In the 11th century, the city became the see of the archdiocese of Burgos and the capital of the now-Kingdom of Castile. Burgos was a major stop for pilgrims on the urban French Way, the most popular path to Santiago de Compostela and a centre of trade between the Bay of Biscay and the south. This region attracted an unusually large foreign merchant population, who became part of the city oligarchy and excluded other foreigners.

Throughout the 13th and 14th centuries, Burgos was a favourite seat of the kings of León and Castile and a favoured burial site. The consejo (medieval urban commune) of Burgos was firmly in the hands of an oligarchic class of knights-villein, who provided the monarchs with cavalry: in 1255 and 1266 royal charters granted relief from taxes to those citizens of Burgos who owned horses and could arm themselves, provided that they continue to live within the city walls. The merchant oligarchy succeeded the cathedral chapter as the major purchasers of land after 1250; they carried on their mercantile business in common with municipal or royal functions and sent their sons to England and Flanders to gain experience in overseas trade. A few families within the Santas Hermandades ('holy confraternities') like the "Good Templars" of Sarracín and Bonifaz succeeded in monopolising the post of alcalde (mayor); a special court, the alcalde del rey, was first mentioned at Burgos in 1281.

By the reign of Alfonso X, the exemption of the non-noble knights and religious corporations, combined with exorbitant gifts and grants to monasteries and private individuals, placed great stress on the economic well-being of the realm.

In the century following the 1248 conquest of Seville, Burgos became a testing ground for royal policies of increasing power against the consejo, in part by encouraging the right to appeal from the consejo to the king. In 1285, Sancho IV of Castile added a new body to the consejo that came to dominate it: the jurado, responsible for collecting taxes and overseeing public works; the king reserved the right to select its members. The city perceived that danger to its autonomy came rather from an uncontrolled aristocracy during royal minorities; Burgos joined the hermandades of cities that allied for mutual protection in 1295 and 1315. In the 14th century, royal intrusion into city affairs was perceived as a palliative against outbreaks of violence by the large, excluded class of smaller merchants and artisans, on whom the tax burden fell. The alguacil was the royal official instituted to judge disagreements.

On 9 June 1345, sweeping aside the city government, Alfonso XI of Castile established direct royal rule of Burgos through the Regimiento of sixteen appointed men.

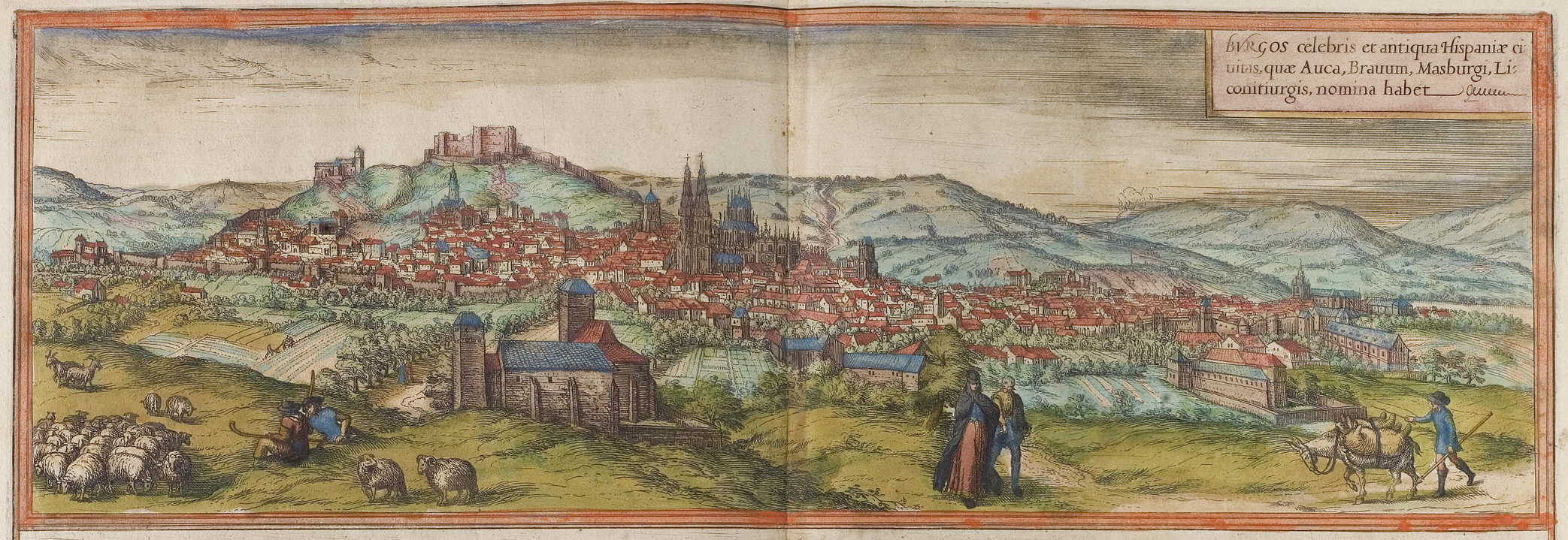
Burgos, as depicted in the Georg Braun & Frans Hogenberg's Civitates Orbis Terrarum (c. 1572)

In 1574, Pope Gregory XIII made the bishopric a metropolitan archbishopric at the request of king Philip II of Spain.

Burgos has been the scene of many wars, including conflicts with Muslim states, struggles between León and Navarre, and conflicts between Castile and Aragon. In the Peninsular War against Napoleonic France, the siege of Burgos (between 19 September to 21 October) was a scene of a withdrawal for Arthur Wellesley, 1st Duke of Wellington. Again, during the 19th century wars of the Spanish succession, Burgos was the site of a battle. During the Spanish Civil War, Burgos was the base of Francisco Franco's rebel Nationalist faction.

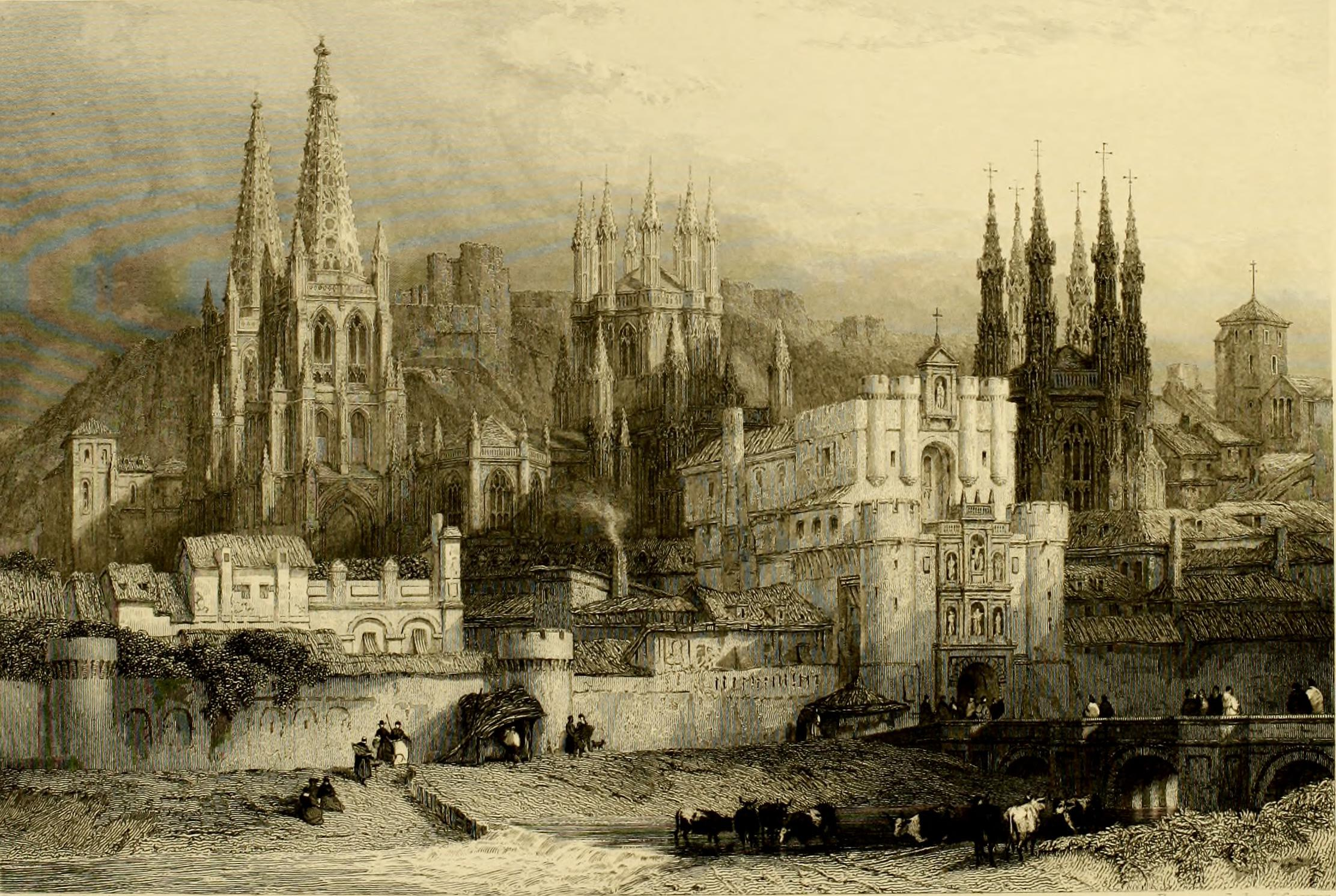
Entrance to Burgos by David Roberts, c. 1838

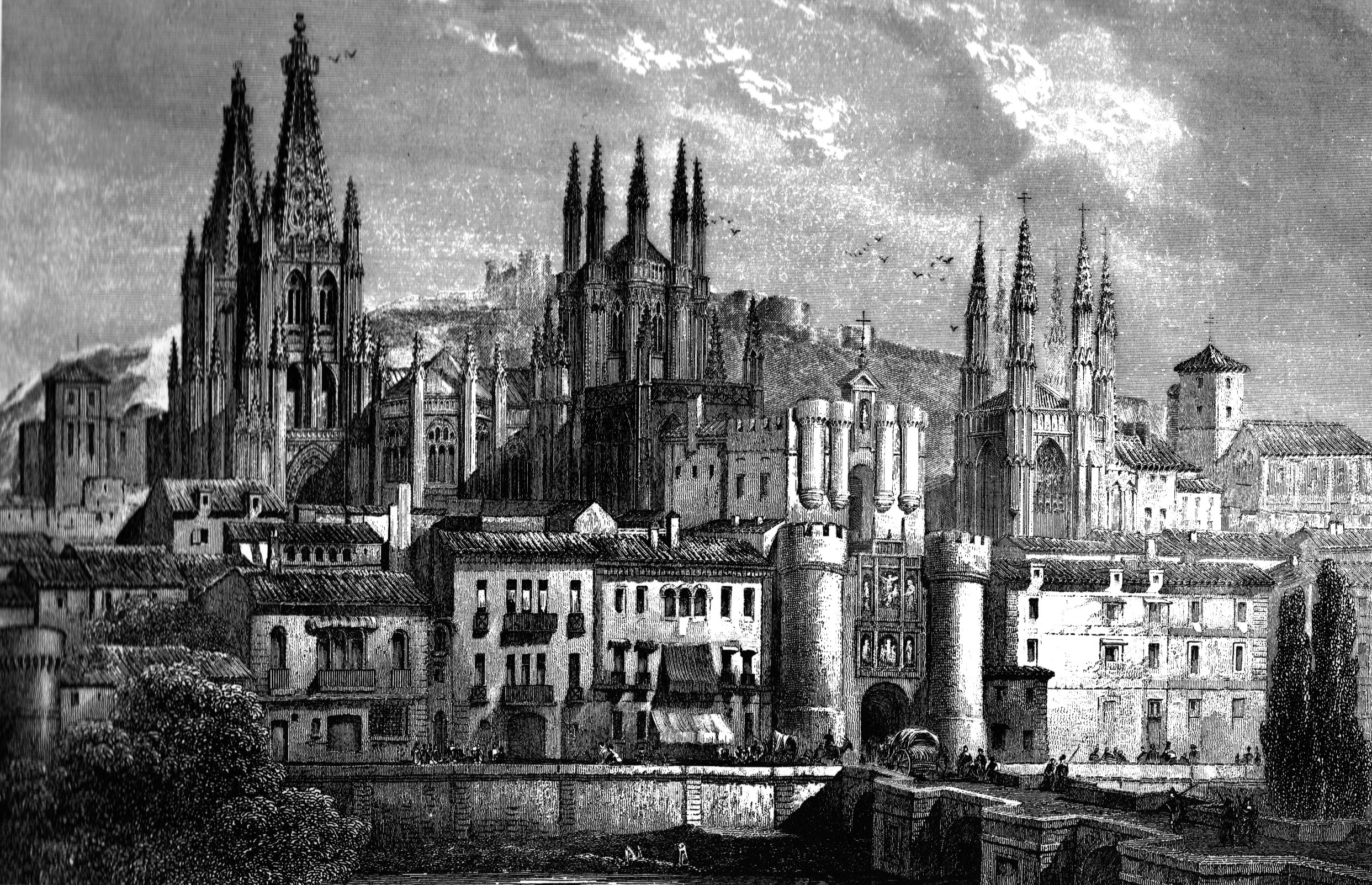
Burgos by Adolphe Rouargue and Émile Rouargue, c. 1850

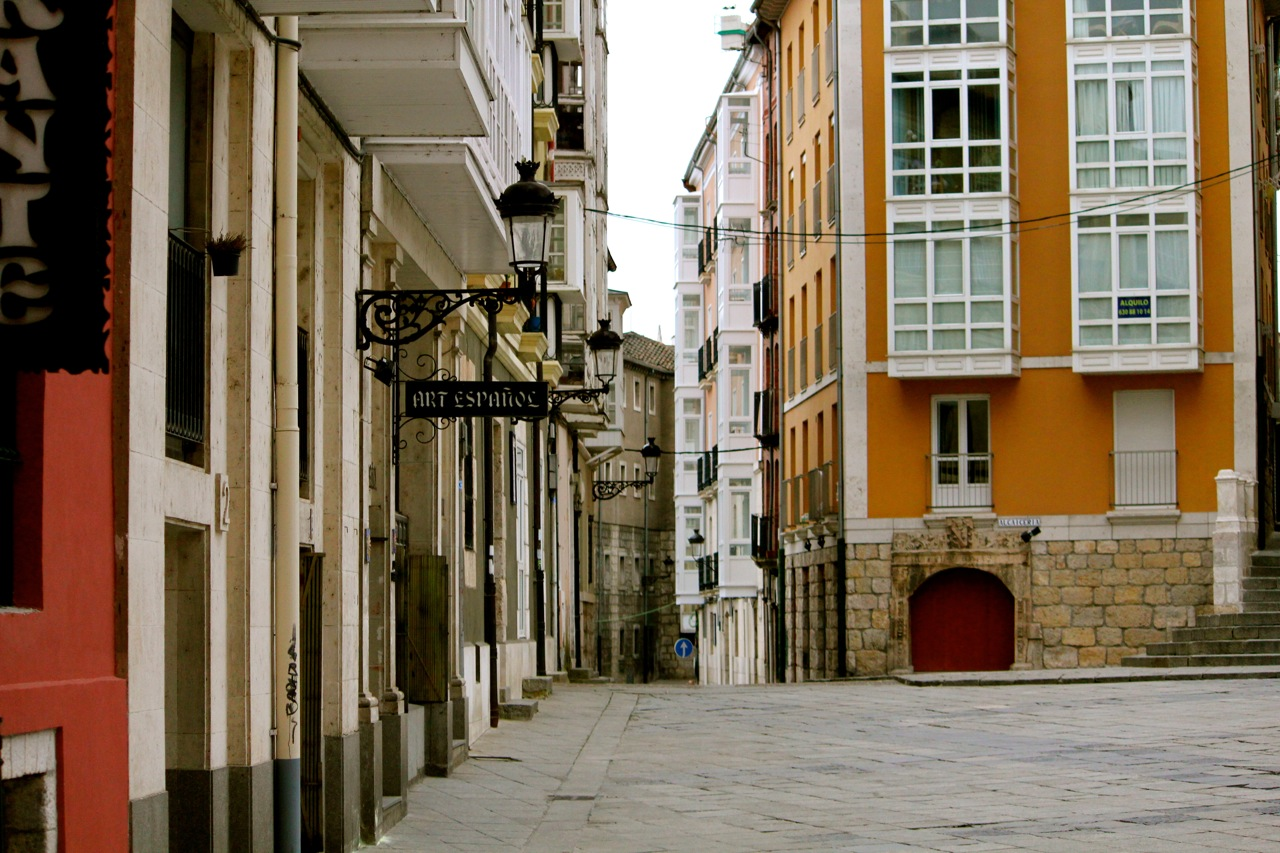
Historic street leading from the cathedral

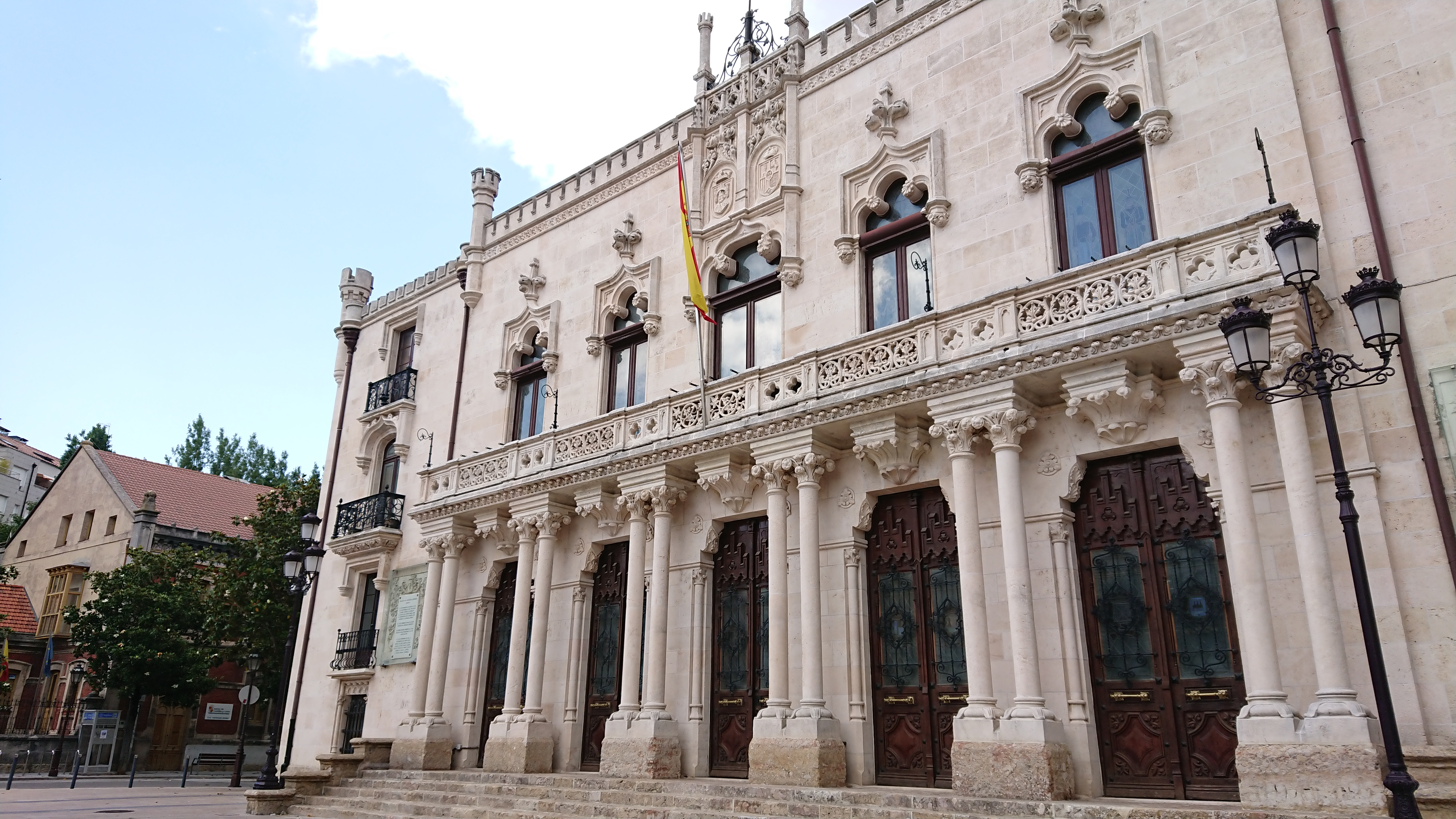
Palace of the Captains General

== Climate ==
At an elevation of 865 metres (2,838 ft), the city of Burgos has a warm-summer Mediterranean climate (Köppen climate classification: Csb), with some continental influence resulting from its distance from the sea and higher altitude. It features chilly and windy winters, due to altitude and an inland location, which always include snow and temperatures below freezing. Burgos is considered the coldest city in Spain, among cities with a population of more than 100,000 inhabitants. Temperature ranges can be extreme and Burgos is drier than Spain's coastal regions, although there is year-round precipitation. Average annual precipitation is 546 mm (21.5 in) and the average annual relative humidity is 72%. In winter, temperatures very often (almost every day) drop below freezing, often reaching temperatures as low as −10 °C (14 °F), and snowfalls are common, while the summer months see average high temperatures of 27.5 °C (81.5 °F). The lowest recorded temperature in Burgos was −22 °C (−8 °F) on 3 January 1971. The highest recorded temperature was 39 °C (102 °F) on 13 August 1987.

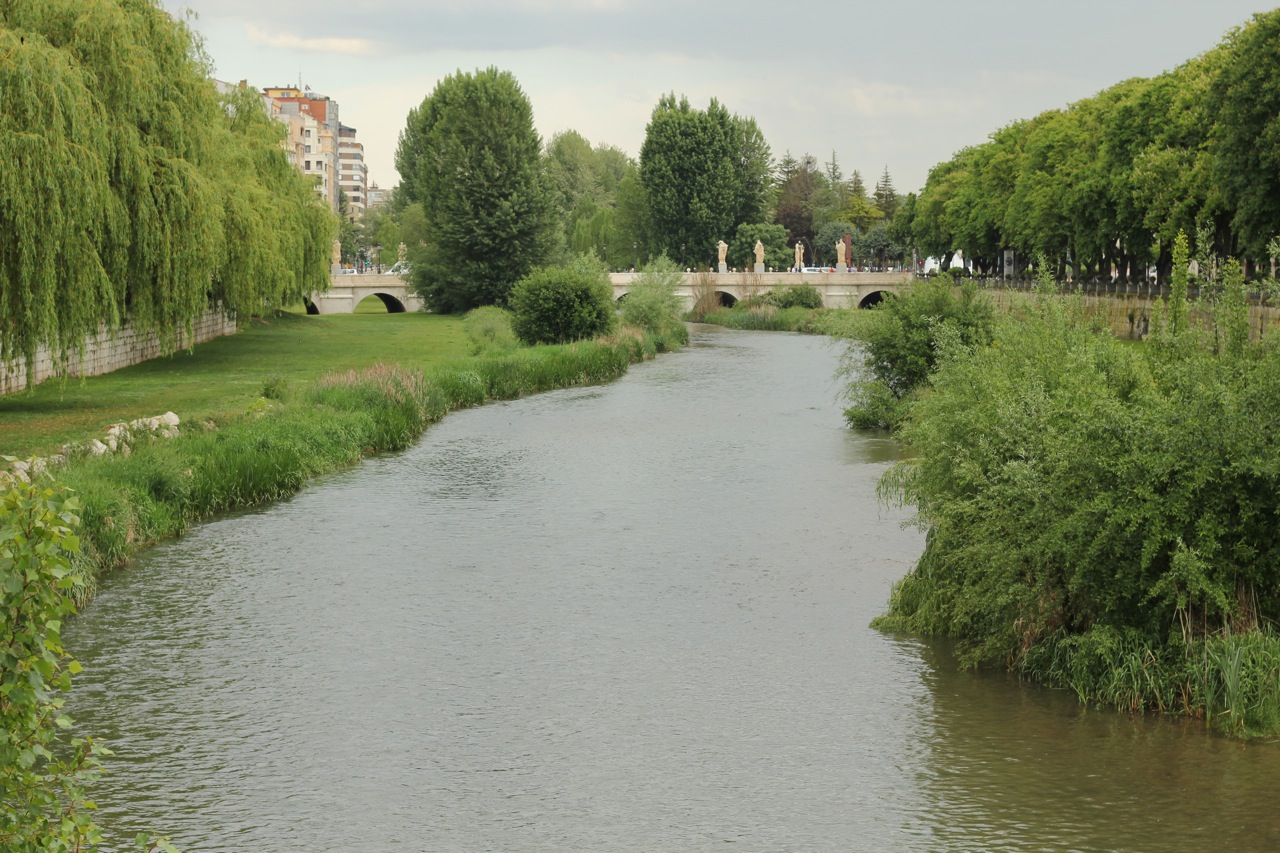
River Arlanzón in spring

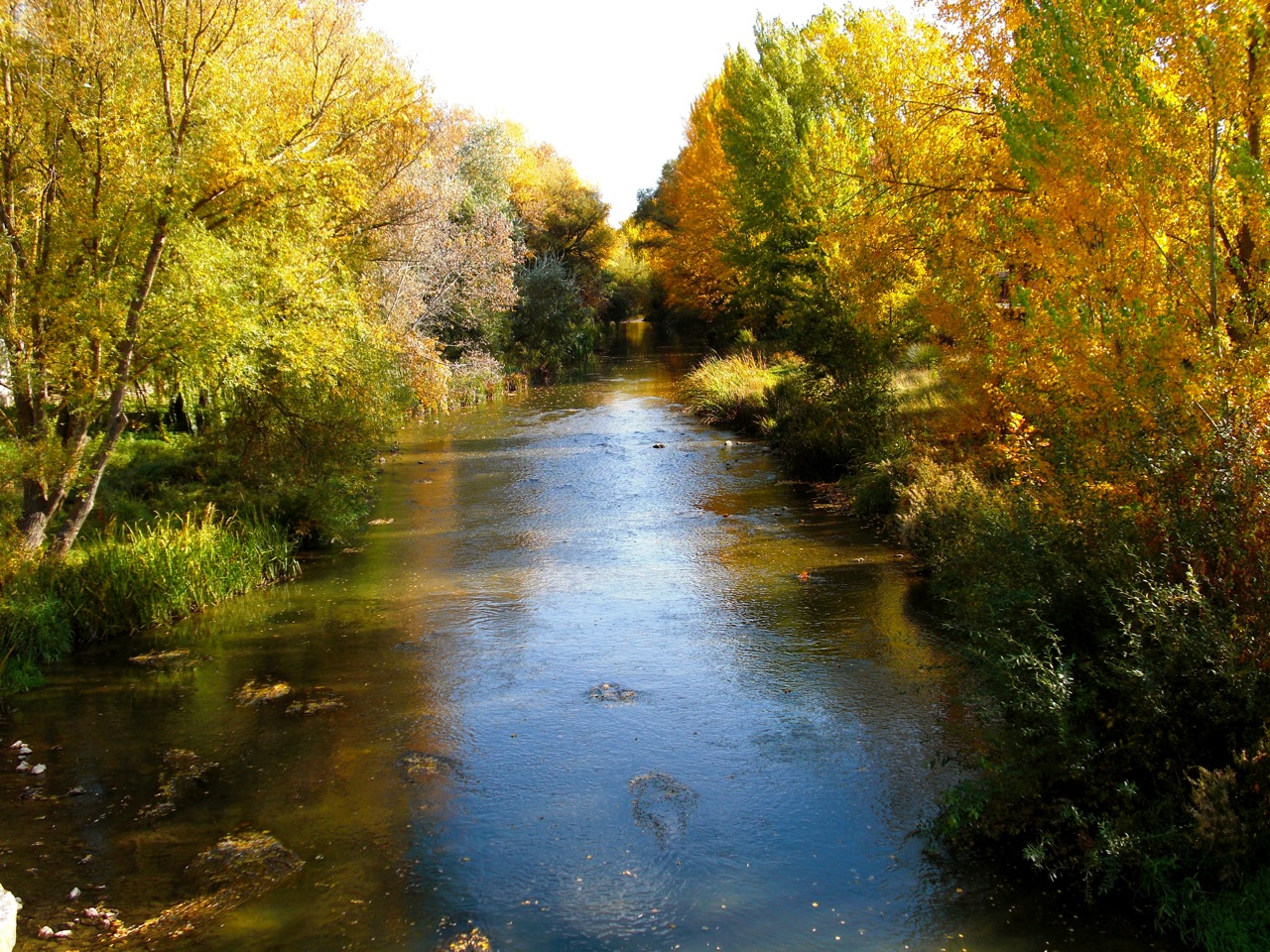
River Arlanzón in autumn

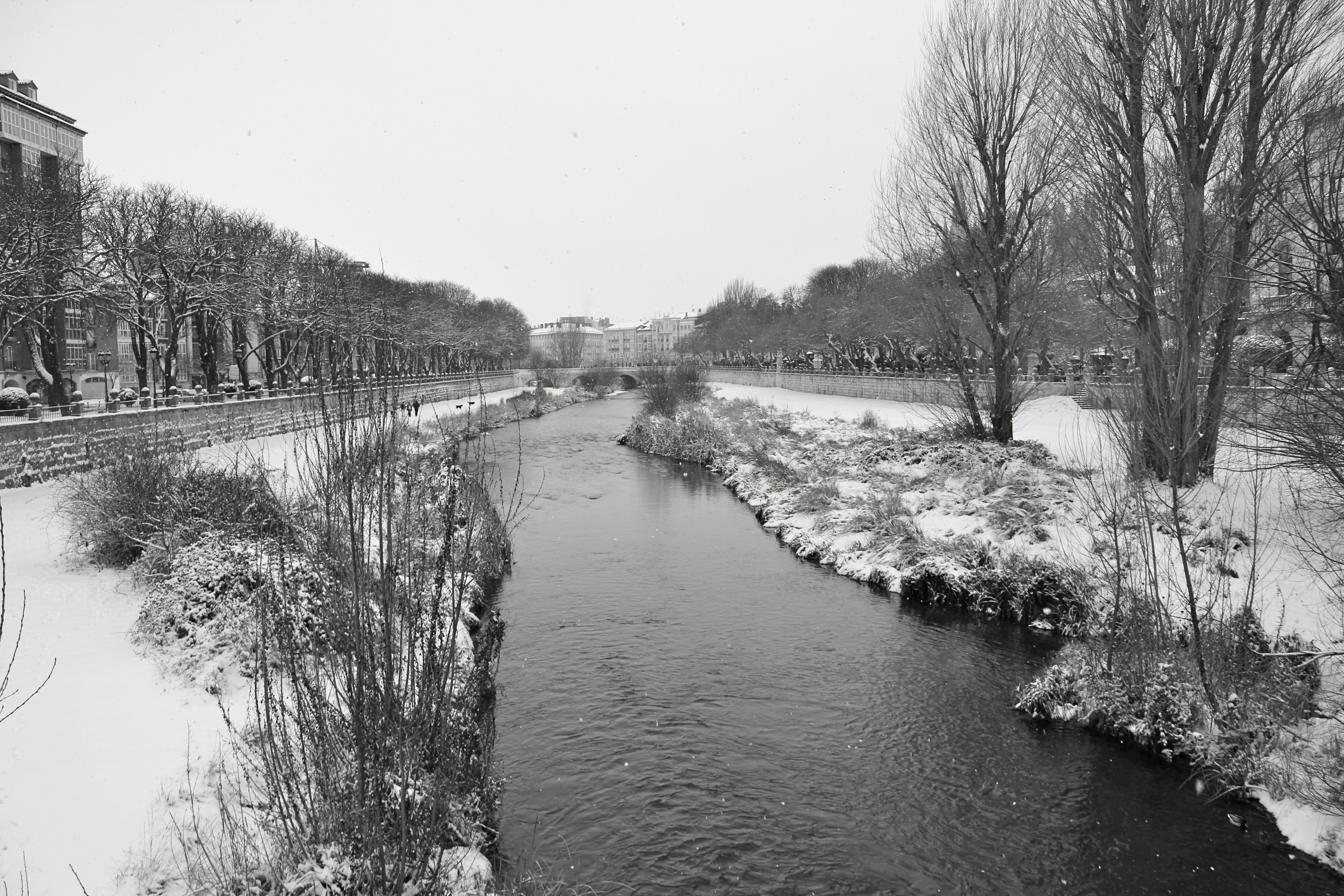
River Arlanzón in winter

Climate data for Burgos Airport 891 metres (2,923 ft) (1991–2020), extremes (1943-present)
Month	Jan	Feb	Mar	Apr	May	Jun	Jul	Aug	Sep	Oct	Nov	Dec	Year
Record high °C (°F)	19.1 (66.4)	22.4 (72.3)	24.6 (76.3)	29.8 (85.6)	33.4 (92.1)	38.8 (101.8)	39.3 (102.7)	39.0 (102.2)	36.8 (98.2)	32.1 (89.8)	24.0 (75.2)	21.0 (69.8)	39.3 (102.7)
Mean daily maximum °C (°F)	7.3 (45.1)	9.1 (48.4)	12.9 (55.2)	15.0 (59.0)	19.2 (66.6)	24.3 (75.7)	27.9 (82.2)	28.0 (82.4)	23.3 (73.9)	17.5 (63.5)	11.0 (51.8)	8.0 (46.4)	17.0 (62.5)
Daily mean °C (°F)	3.5 (38.3)	4.3 (39.7)	7.1 (44.8)	9.1 (48.4)	12.7 (54.9)	16.9 (62.4)	19.8 (67.6)	19.9 (67.8)	16.1 (61.0)	11.9 (53.4)	6.8 (44.2)	4.2 (39.6)	11.0 (51.8)
Mean daily minimum °C (°F)	−0.3 (31.5)	−0.6 (30.9)	1.3 (34.3)	3.0 (37.4)	6.1 (43.0)	9.5 (49.1)	11.7 (53.1)	11.8 (53.2)	9.0 (48.2)	6.1 (43.0)	2.6 (36.7)	0.3 (32.5)	5.0 (41.1)
Record low °C (°F)	−22.0 (−7.6)	−17.6 (0.3)	−12.0 (10.4)	−6.9 (19.6)	−7.6 (18.3)	0.0 (32.0)	0.1 (32.2)	0.8 (33.4)	−1.4 (29.5)	−5.0 (23.0)	−9.9 (14.2)	−17.1 (1.2)	−22.0 (−7.6)
Average precipitation mm (inches)	47.2 (1.86)	35.0 (1.38)	44.1 (1.74)	59.9 (2.36)	57.3 (2.26)	43.0 (1.69)	24.1 (0.95)	18.8 (0.74)	33.4 (1.31)	62.8 (2.47)	63.3 (2.49)	57.4 (2.26)	546.3 (21.51)
Average precipitation days (≥ 1 mm)	8.2	6.9	7.5	9.0	9.0	5.8	3.5	3.4	5.3	8.3	9.7	8.2	84.8
Average snowy days	5.2	5.3	3.6	1.6	0.2	0	0	0	0	0.1	1.7	3.5	21.2
Average relative humidity (%)	85	78	70	69	66	61	55	55	63	73	82	85	70
Mean monthly sunshine hours	87	122	177	192	242	279	329	307	231	164	96	84	2,310
Percentage possible sunshine	29	40	47	48	53	61	71	71	61	47	32	29	49
Source: Agencia Estatal de Meteorología

== Demographics ==
Historical population (current boundaries)
Year	Pop.	±%
1842	16,498	—
1857	27,322	+65.6%
1877	32,821	+20.1%
1887	35,469	+8.1%
1900	32,641	−8.0%
1910	31,961	−2.1%
1920	33,311	+4.2%
1930	39,467	+18.5%
1940	52,822	+33.8%
1950	64,739	+22.6%
1960	81,297	+25.6%
1970	116,797	+43.7%
1981	152,545	+30.6%
1991	160,278	+5.1%
2001	166,187	+3.7%
2011	178,864	+7.6%
2021	174,154	−2.6%
Source: INE

As of 2025, the population is 178,370, of which 47.7% are male, and 52.3% are female. Minors make up 15.6% of the population, and seniors make up 24.8%.

=== Immigration ===
As of 2025, immigrants make up 14.7% of the population. The 5 largest foreign countries of birth are Colombia, Romania, Venezuela, Ecuador, and Morocco.

Foreign population by country of birth (2025)
Country	Population
Colombia	4,721
Romania	2,394
Venezuela	2,346
Ecuador	2,122
Morocco	1,644
Dominican Republic	1,309
Bulgaria	1,117
Peru	1,070
Brazil	713
Cuba	575
Argentina	527
Pakistan	520
Algeria	450
Portugal	401
France	387

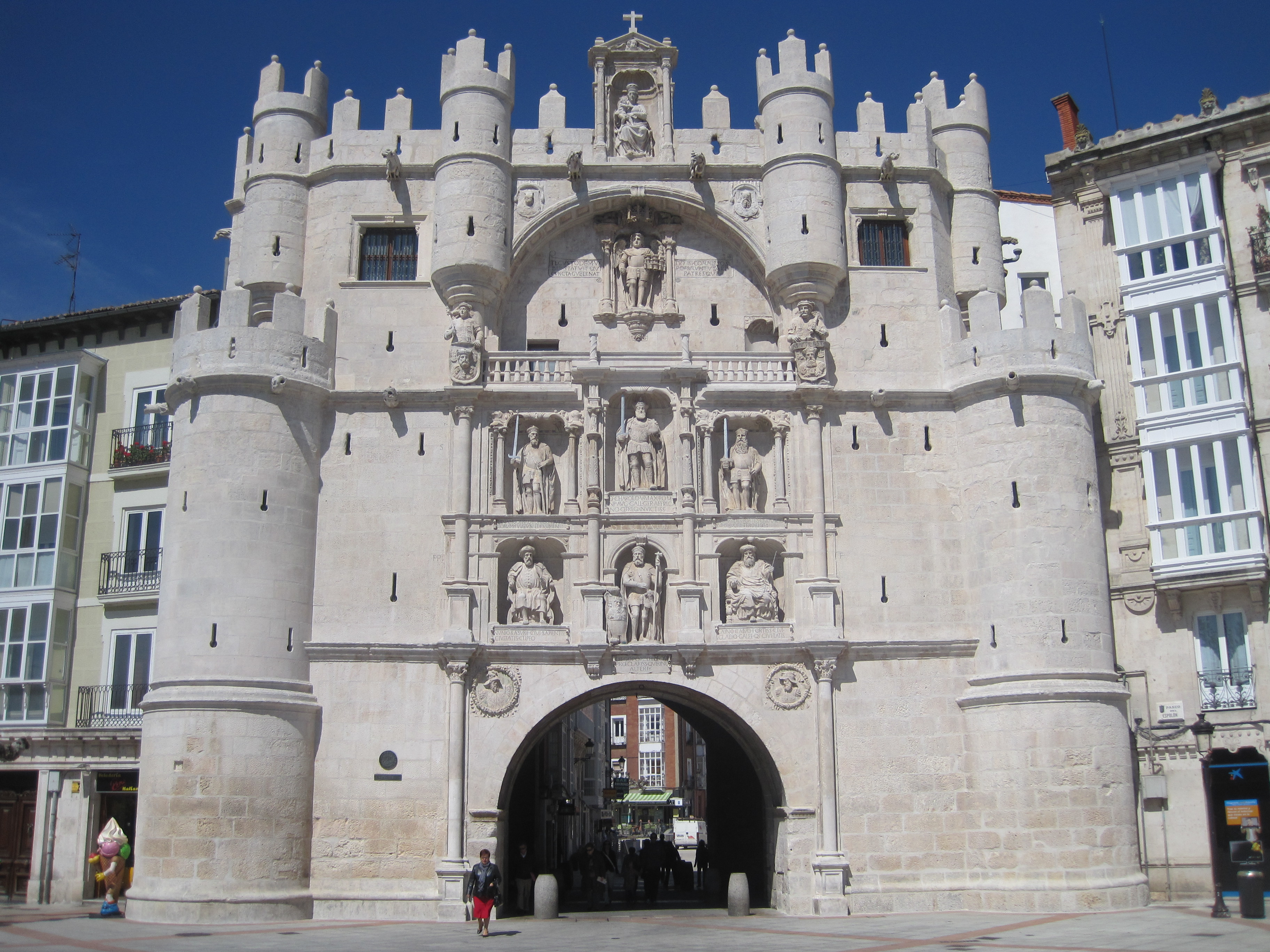
14th-century city gate Arco de Santa María

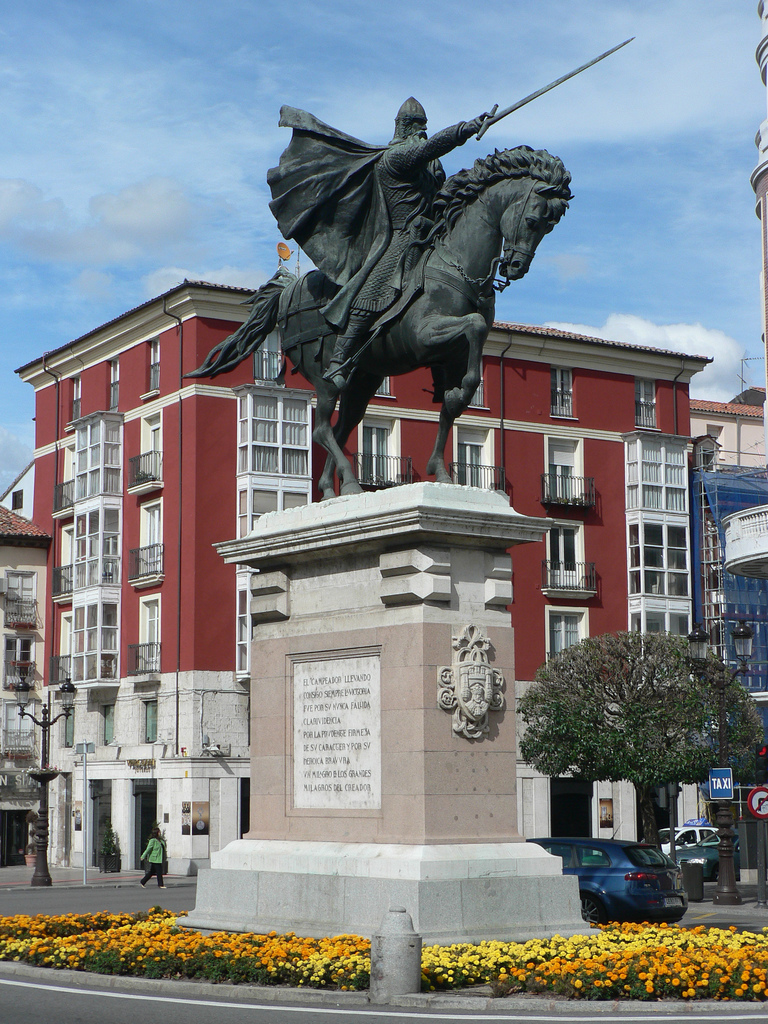
The statue of El Cid

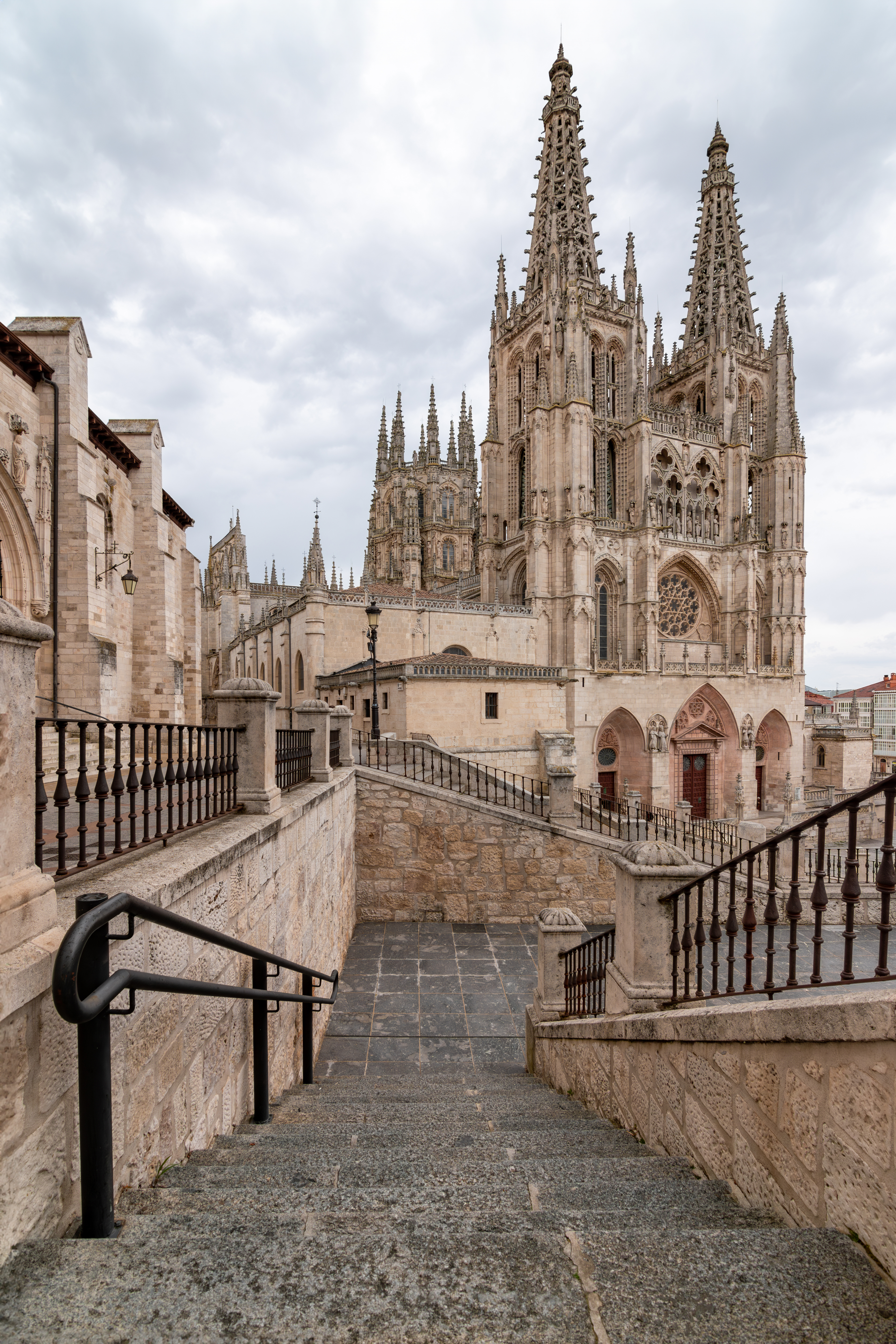
Cathedral of Saint Mary of Burgos

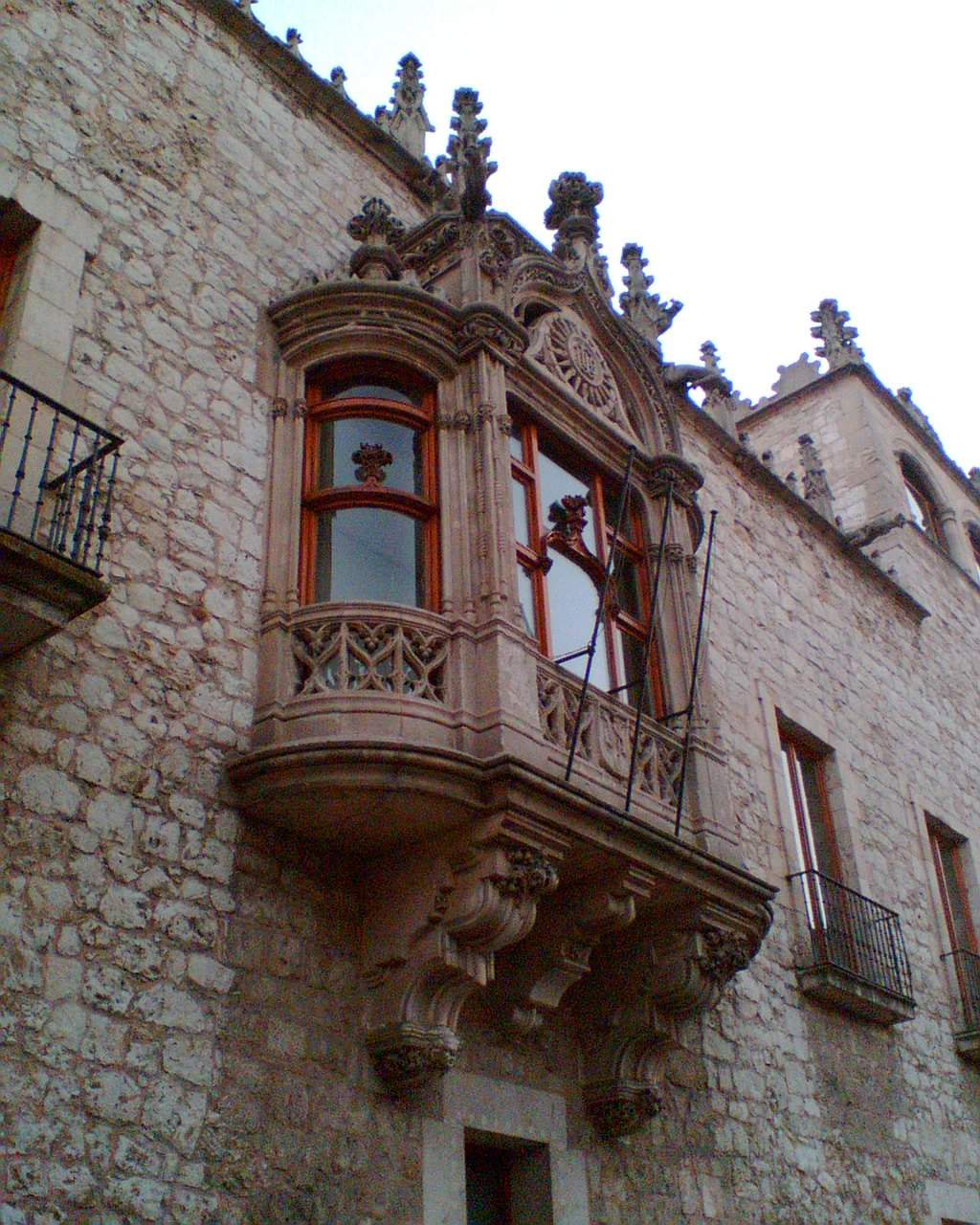
Detail of the façade of the 15th-century Palace of the Constables of Castile

== Sights ==
Burgos is rich in ancient churches and convents. The three most notable are the cathedral, with its chapel of the Condestables de Castilla (Lords Constable of Castile), the monastery of Las Huelgas and the Carthusian monastery of Miraflores. Minor notable churches are San Esteban, San Gil (Sancti Aegidii), San Pedro, San Cosme y San Damián, Santiago (Sancti Jacobi), San Lorenzo and San Lesmes (Adelelmi). The Convento de la Merced, occupied by the Jesuits, and the Hospital del Rey are also of historic and architectural interest.

Among the other interesting architectural structures, in the walls of the city are the gateway of Santa María, erected for the first entrance of the Emperor Charles V, and the arch of Fernán González.

=== Gothic Cathedral ===
Construction on Burgos' Gothic Cathedral began in 1221 and spanned mainly from the 13th to 15th centuries. It has been declared a UNESCO World Heritage Site. The Cathedral is the resting place for El Cid (the famous knight from Medieval Spain's history) and his wife Doña Jimena. The west front is flanked by towers terminating in octagonal spires covered with open stonework traceries. The middle section, which serves as an entrance, has three alabaster pilasters, the intercolumnar spaces bearing panel-pictures representing the martyrdom of saints. The façade possesses ornate and fantastic surface decoration.

The octagonal chapel of the Condestable, in florid, thus highly sculpted, Gothic design, has a roof finished with balustraded turrets, needle-pointed pinnacles and statues. In the lower portion, coats of arms, shields and crouching lions have been worked into the ensemble. The exterior of the sacristy is decorated with carved traceries, figures of angels and armoured knights. The elaborate tabernacle is composed of two octagonal sections in Corinthian style.

=== Monasterio de las Huelgas ===
The Monasterio de las Huelgas Reales (Monastery of the Royal Retreats) on the outskirts of the city, was founded in 1180 by king Alfonso VIII, and was begun in a pre-Gothic style, although almost every style has been introduced over many additions. The cloisters have been described as "unrivalled for beauty both of detail and design, and perhaps unsurpassed by anything in its age and style in any part of Europe" (1911 Encyclopædia Britannica). One cloister has semicircular arches with varied columns; the other has an ogival style of early Gothic. The interior of the church has enormous columns supporting its vault. This convent historically benefited from privileges granted to its abbess by kings and popes.

=== Miraflores Charterhouse ===
The Carthusian monastery, Miraflores Charterhouse (Cartuja de Miraflores) is situated about four kilometres from the historic city center. Among the treasures of the Charterhouse are the wooden statue of St. Bruno, the wooden choir stalls in the church and the tombs of King Juan II and of his spouse, Queen Isabella of Portugal, constructed of marble and with their recumbent effigies sculpted in alabaster. Around the top frieze are statues of angels in miniature. The French soldiers in the Spanish War of Independence (1814) mutilated this work, cutting off some of the heads and carrying them away to France. King Juan II's daughters by his first wife, heiresses Princesses Catherine and Eleanor of Asturias, are also buried in the monastery.

=== Castle ===
Located on a hill 75 meters above the city, it is a medieval defensive fortress built during the time of the reconquest. Used by Castilian kings as accommodation and a place for celebrations, it later became an artillery fort and then a weapons factory. After its destruction by the French during the War of Independence in 1813, there are hardly any buildings left standing. From the Castle it is possible to see fantastic views of the city.

=== Museums ===
Burgos has a total of 10 museums, the newest being the Museum of Human Evolution (the 10th most visited museum in Spain).

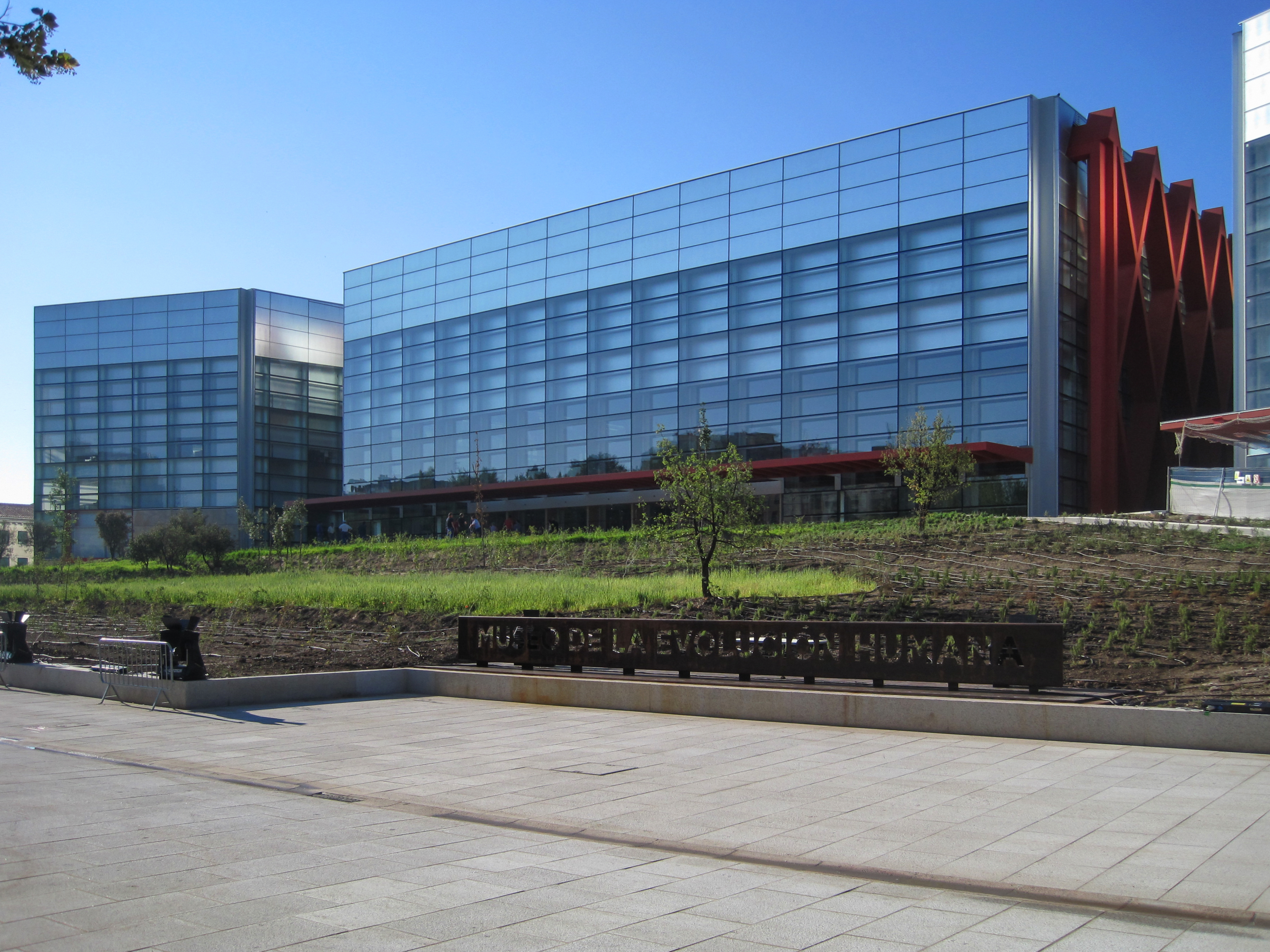
Frontal view of the Museum of Human Evolution

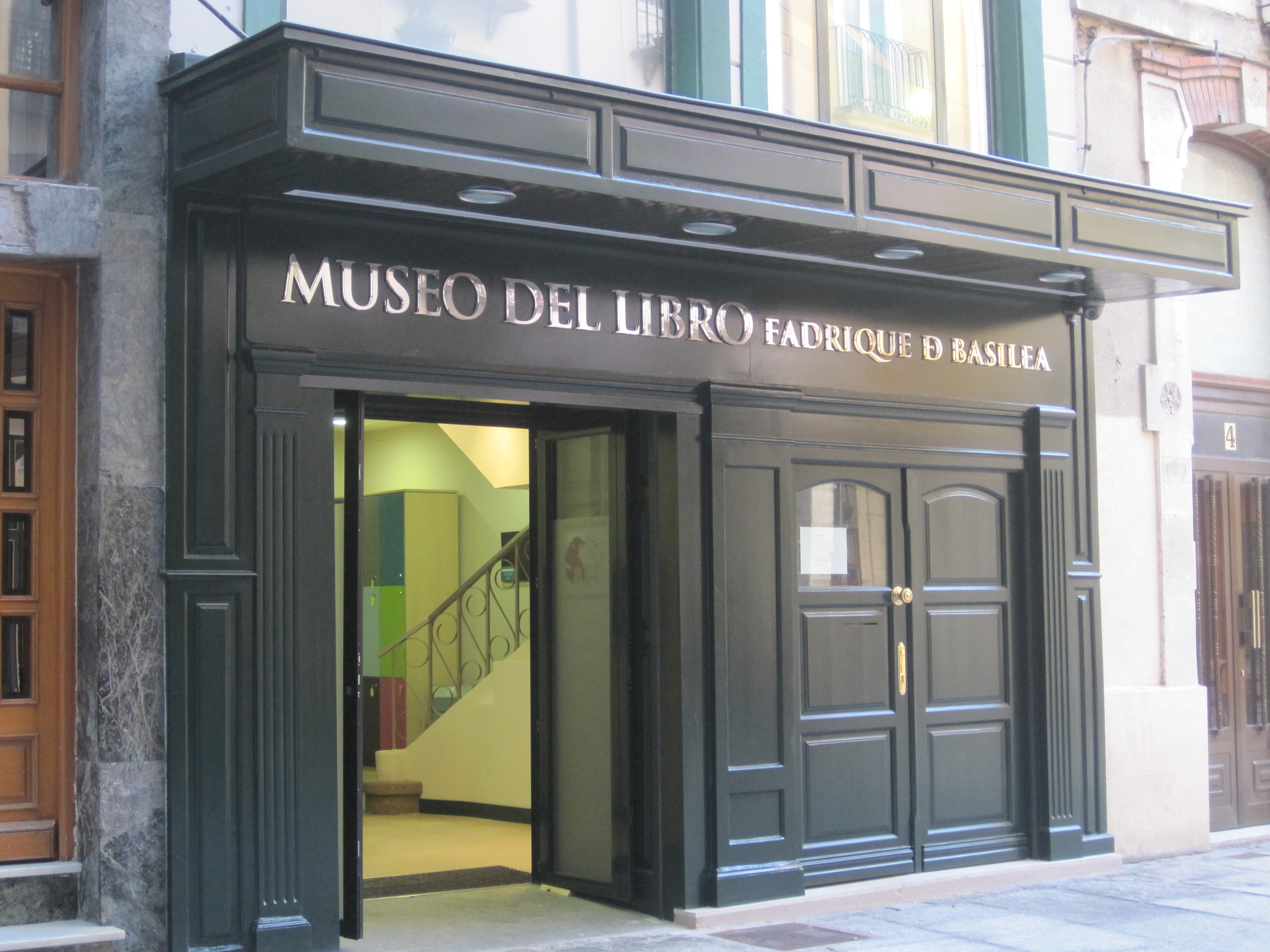
Book Museum

==== Museum of Human Evolution ====
The Museum of Human Evolution was inaugurated on 13 July 2010. Its foundation is based on the archaeological site of Atapuerca located 20 km (12 mi) east of Burgos. The Atapuerca site has been designated a UNESCO World Heritage Site. It contains several caves, where fossils and stone tools of the earliest known hominids in West Europe have been found, near Atapuerca Mountains.

The museum also allows the visitor to travel to the archaeological site and biological park.

==== Museum of Burgos ====
It summarizes the history of the province of Burgos. It has important objects and documents from all the ages, starting from Atapuerca, passing to the Romans and Iberians, and finishing in the contemporary period. These include the traditional sword of El Cid.

The museum is located in the renaissances palaces, the House of Íñigo Angulo and the House of Miranda, which has a main patio that structures the museum.

==== Book Museum ====
Between the Main Square "Plaza Mayor" and the Promenade of the Espolón "Paseo del Espolón," on the side street, Travesía del Mercado nº3, you find the Fadrique de Basilea Book Museum "Museo del Libro Fadrique de Basilea", of the Burgos publisher, Siloé, a museum that shows the history of the book from its first written form to its modern electronic form.

== Parks and recreation ==
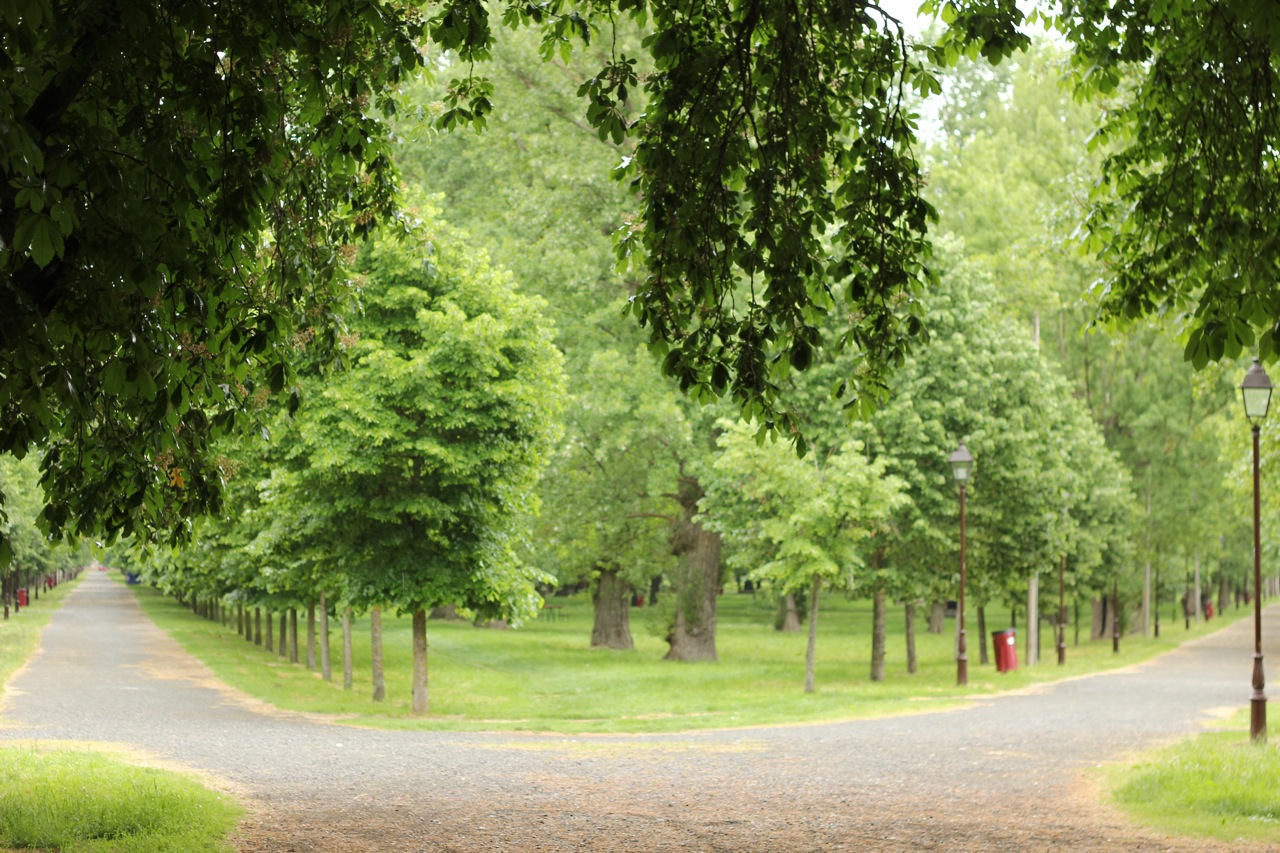
Parque El Parral

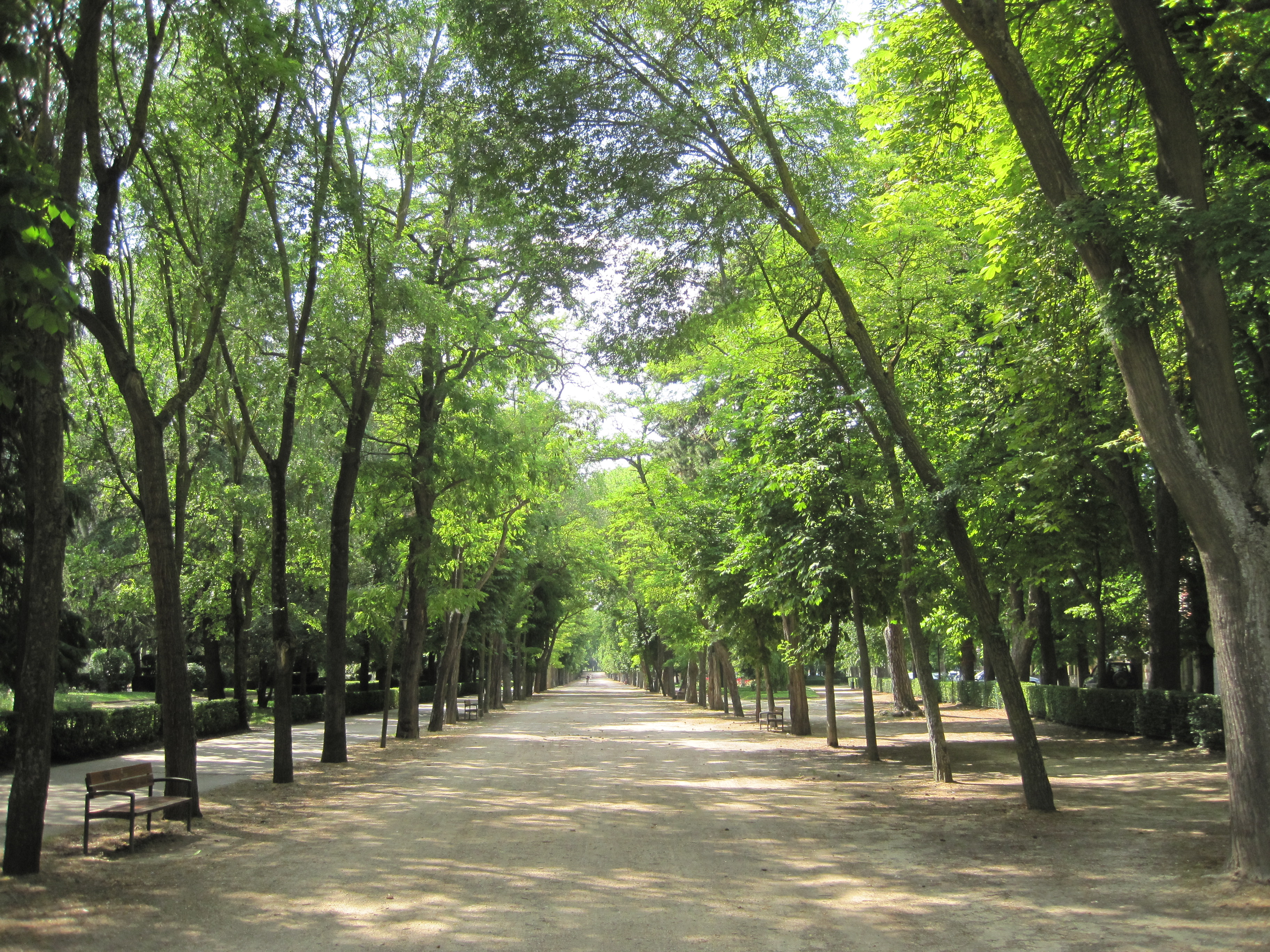
La Isla

Most of the parks in the city of Burgos can be found along the river Arlanzón. Indeed, the banks of the river itself constitute a green corridor along the city. In total, there are nearly 3 square miles (1,878 acres) of parks in Burgos and one tree for every 3 inhabitants.

- El Parque del Castillo (or the Castle Park) is one of the lungs of the city. The city grew from the southern foot of the hill of the castle. Gradually, some of the upper neighborhoods began disappearing. After the destruction of the castle, military installations were established there. In the 1950s, the engineer Jaquotot Mariano, who later became mayor of the city, decided to leave the hill completely bare. Besides the ruins of the castle, this park contains the Bird Conservation Center, as well as play areas for children and spaces for exercise. Also, there is a terraced area with gardens and an ornamental fountain. The highlight of the park is the viewpoint from which you get a great view of the city, especially the cathedral. A metal plaque on the rail at the vista point helps to identify the most characteristic places of the city. The park contains the unique view of the city of Burgos from the viewpoint of the Castle. During special events throughout the year, visitors can see fireworks displays from that same view point. The park can be reached by car where there is parking, and on foot by climbing a series of stairs starting from the church of San Esteban.
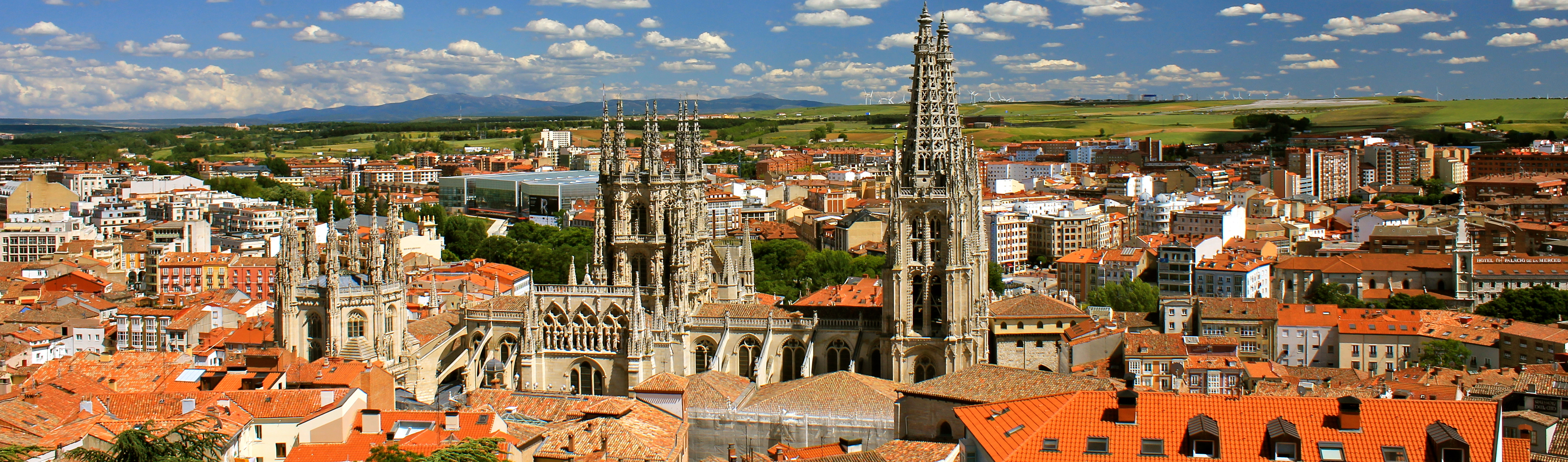
Panoramic of Burgos; view facing south-east
- Fuentes Blancas is Burgos' most visited large park extending east from the city along the river Arlanzón. It contains a network of walking and biking paths and includes camping and various outdoor recreational activities.
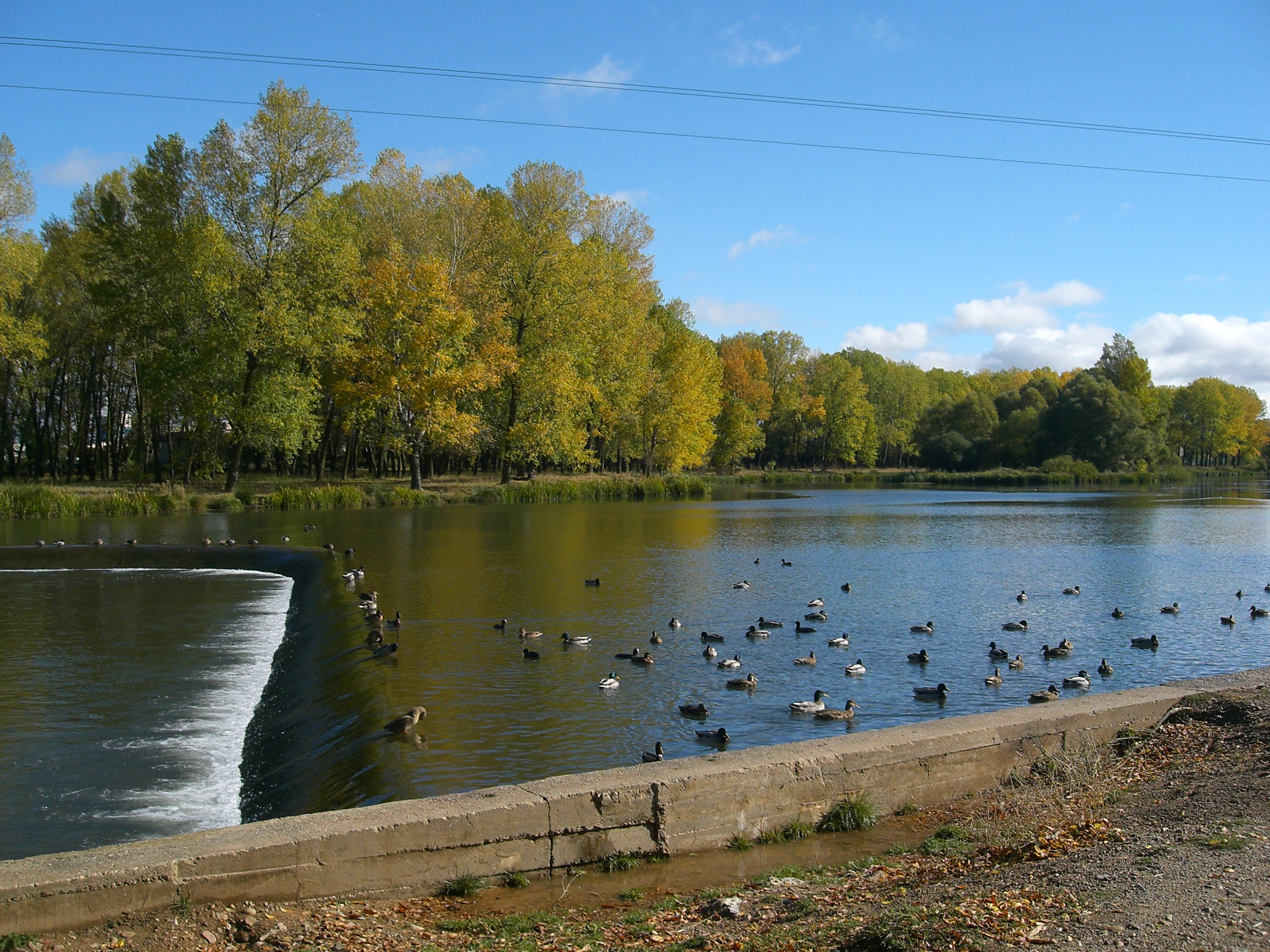
  Weir and beach of Fuentes Blancas
- El Paseo del Espolón is the tree-lined promenade that is the most emblematic of Burgos. It's situated along the banks of the river Arlanzón, and consists of a landscaped walk that goes from the theater square to the Arc de Santa Maria, passing shops and cafes.

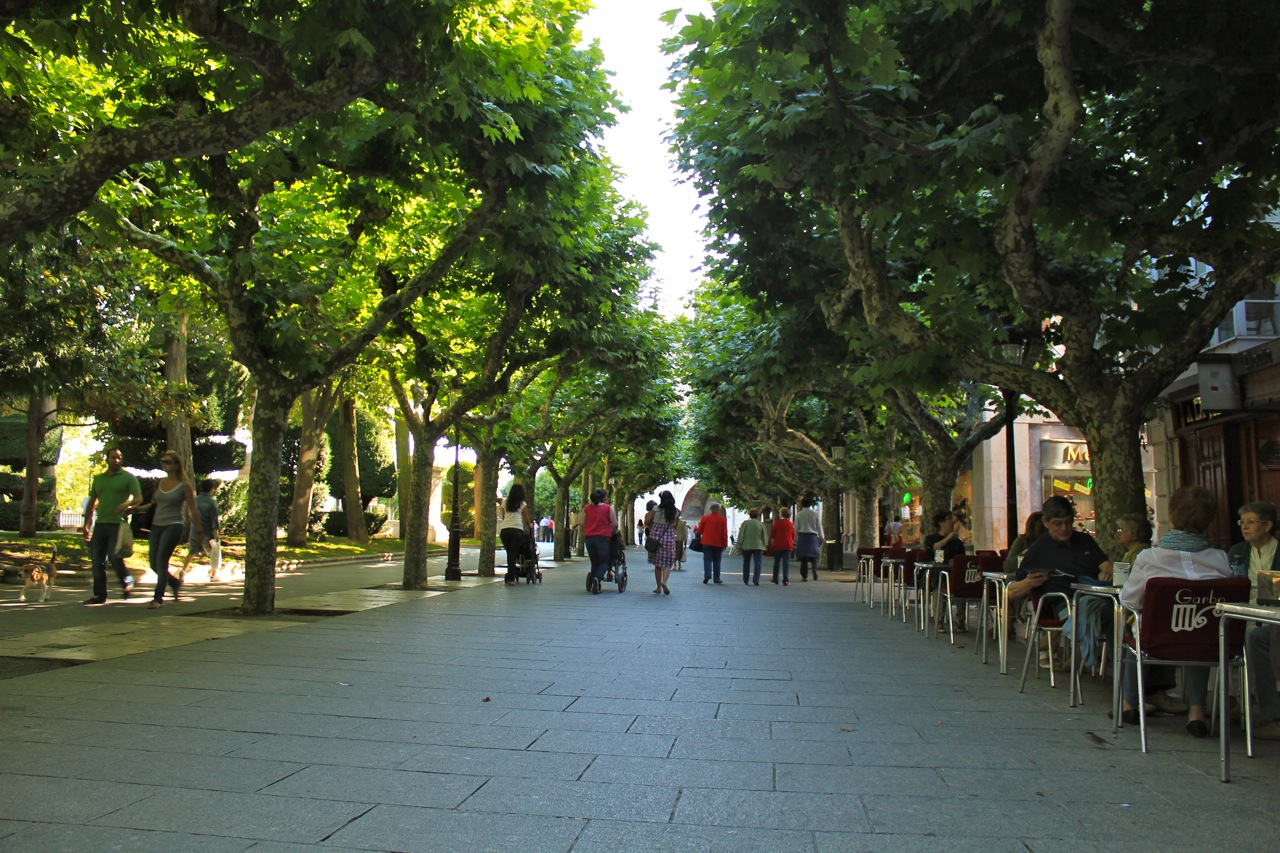
Summer on the "Paseo del Espolón"

- El Paseo de la Isla is another one of Burgos' tree-lined garden walks. It passes by the Palacio de la Isla which served as one of Franco's headquarters during the Spanish Civil War and is currently the Language Institute of Castilian and Leonese.
- Parque de El Parral is located at the old "Hospital del Rey", a former hospital for pilgrims of the "Way of Saint James", now part of the University of Burgos campus.
- El paseo de la Quinta is located on the south bank of the Arlanzón River, on the old and new path of the Cartuja de Miraflores. In the natural area of Las Veguillas, the Municipal Nurseries and the Fuentes Blancas Park, a wooded area near the city and close to the extensive pine forests of La Cartuja. It gets its name from old property of Burgos prelates, known as Quinta del Arzobispo.

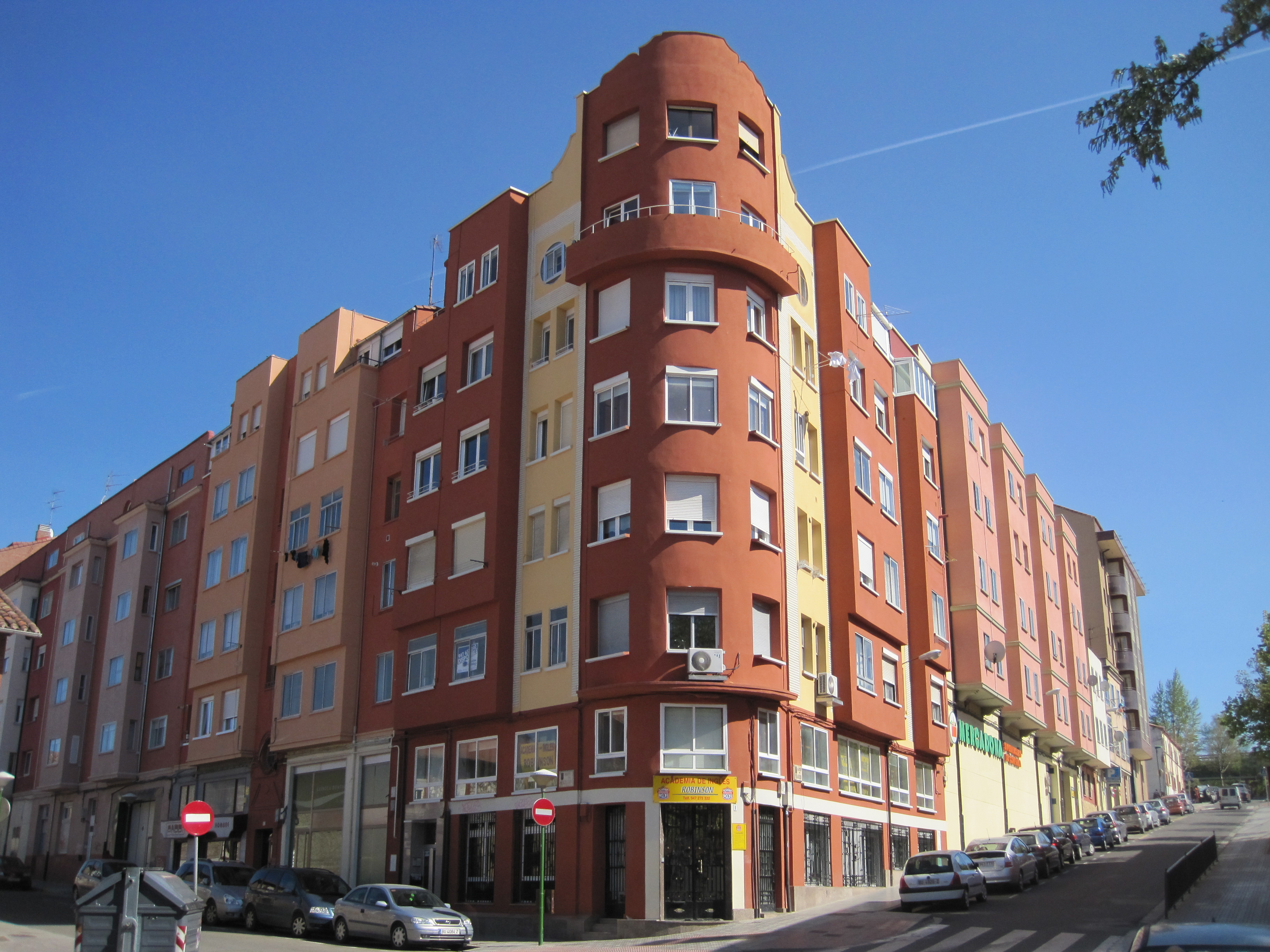
View of a 1950s-era building in the El Crucero district

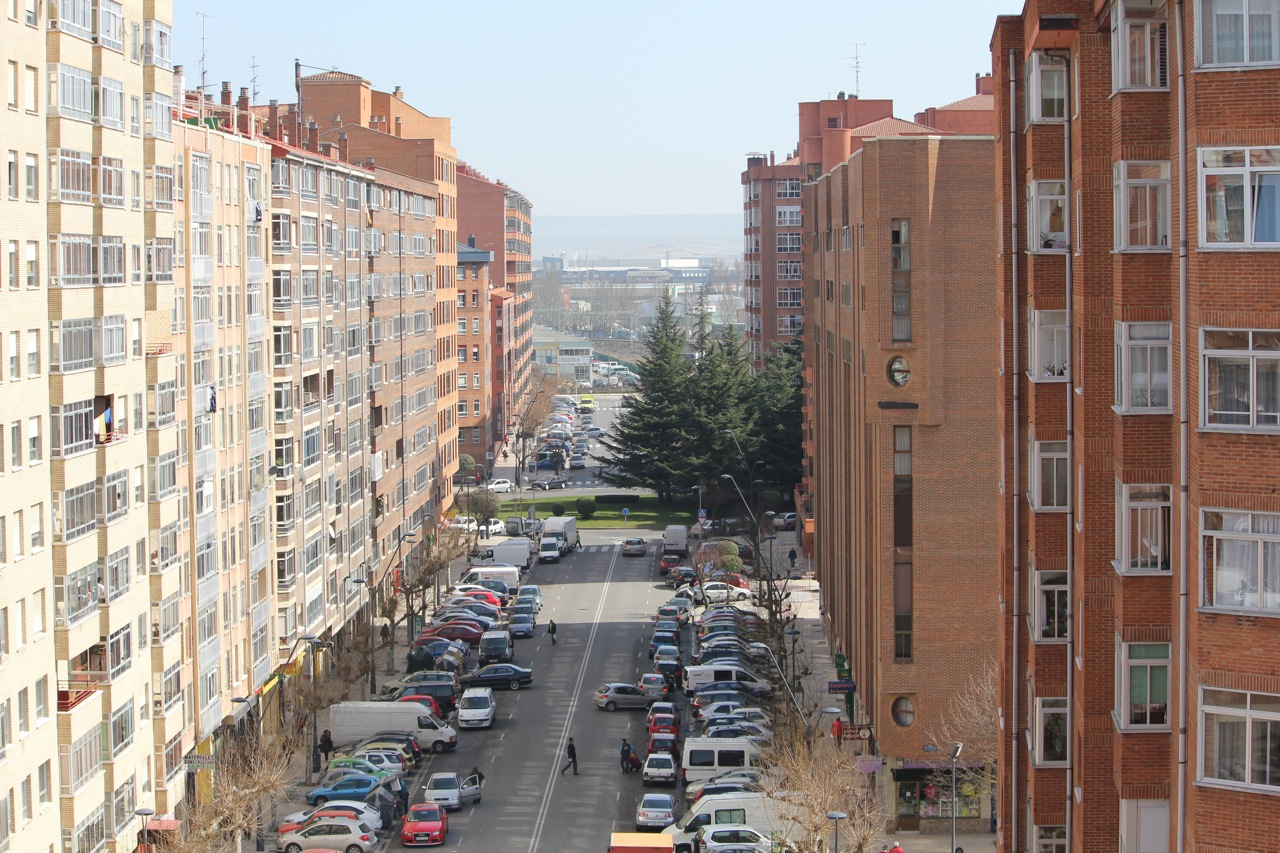
1960s-era urbanisation in the working-class district of Gamonal

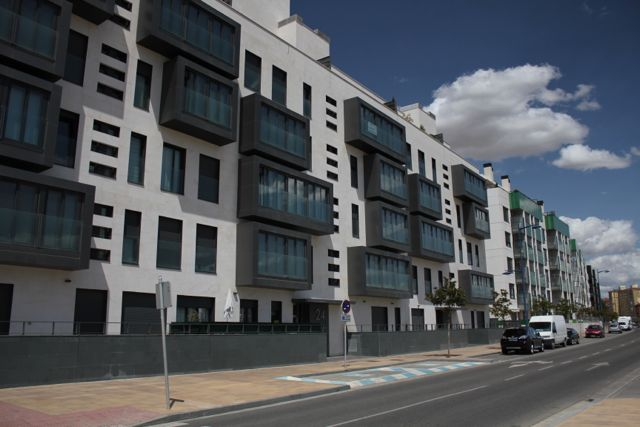
Modern urbanisation developments

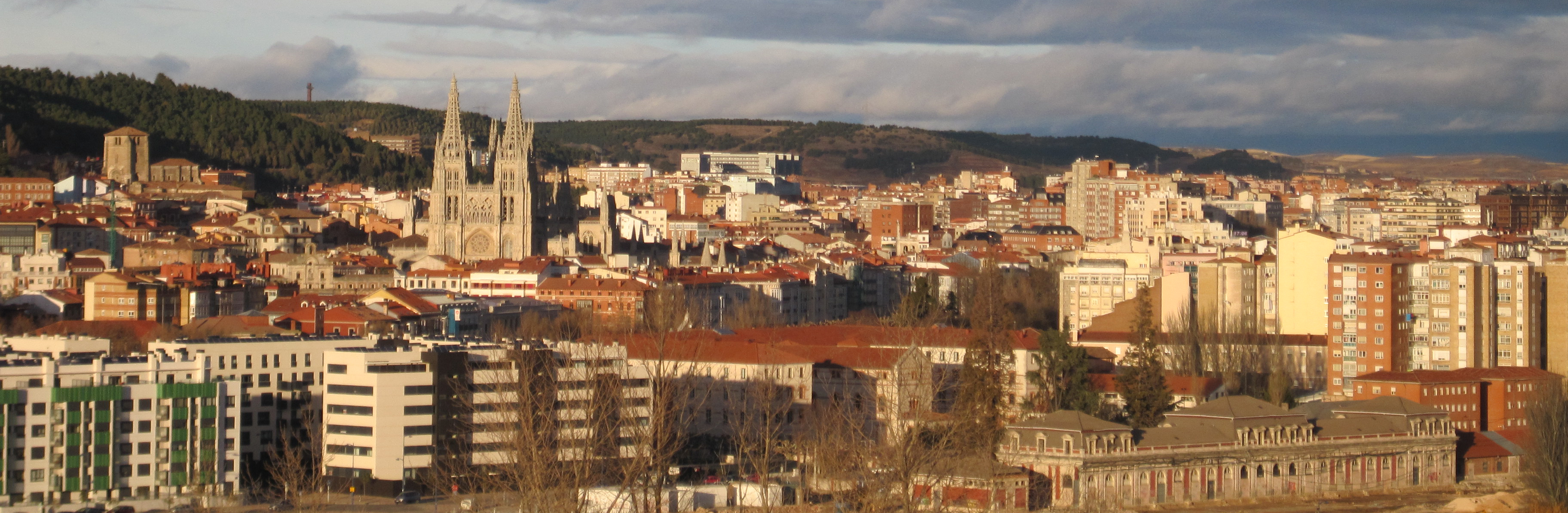
Panoramic of Burgos; view facing north

== Education ==
State Education in Spain is free, and compulsory from 6 to 16 years. The current education system is called LOE (Ley Orgánica de Educación).

=== Universities ===
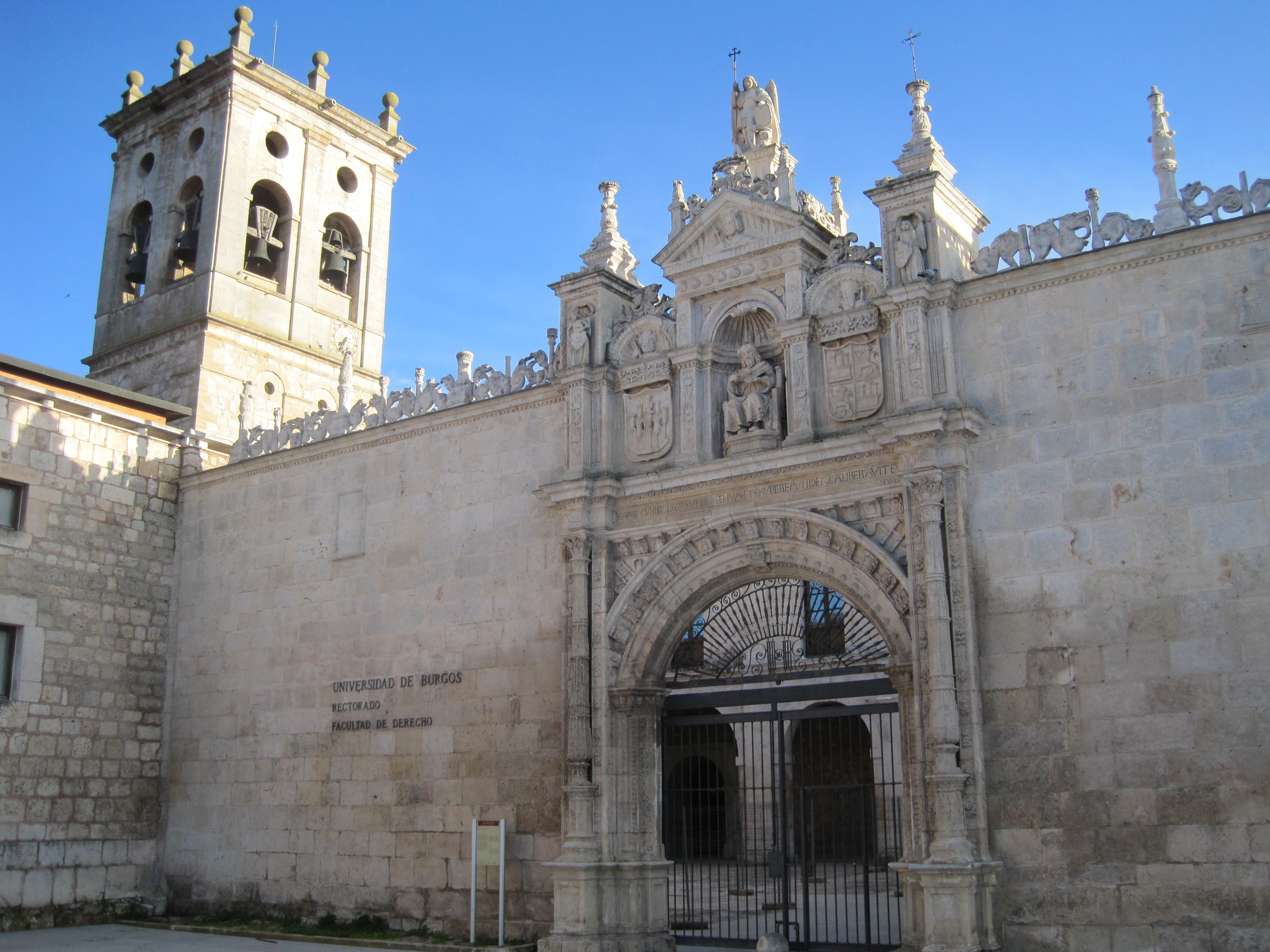
University of Burgos

University of Burgos

Often abbreviated 'UBU', the University of Burgos is a public university with about 10,000 students studying over 30 different undergraduate degrees, over 20 PhD Programmes, as well as several Official Masters and other graduate courses. It was established in 1994 when it was divided from the University of Valladolid.

UBU cooperates with the Erasmus Project, a European Union (EU) student-exchange programme, and each semester hosts students from various countries across the 15-state European Union, as well as Iceland, Liechtenstein, Norway, Malta and associated countries in Eastern Europe. Additionally, university students from various regions around the world including China, Latin and North America are able to participate in exchange programmes to study abroad at the University of Burgos. In total, the University of Burgos has education agreements with over 100 international academic institutions.

Isabella I of Castile University

Isabella I of Castile University, established in 2008, is a private state-recognized university located in Burgos. It was fully accredited by the Spanish Government in 2011.

== Culture ==
The city has a complete culture infrastructure, remarked by the Auditorio y Palacio de Congresos de Burgos, which opened in mid-2012.

=== Language ===
Spanish, also called Castilian, originated in Castile and spread throughout the Crown of Castile's possessions following the reconquista. It was eventually dispersed throughout the Spanish empire following the conquest and colonization of the Americas, and Spain after the union of the Catholic Monarchs's kingdoms being co-spoken with other languages. Of the many different variations and dialects found throughout the world, it's argued that the purest Spanish can be found in the region of Burgos due to the fact that the language first developed here in the 10th century.

The Spanish language can be traced back to the monastery of Valpuesta located 100 km (62 mi) north-east of the city of Burgos. The Valpuesta cartularies are significant in the history of the Spanish language, and their status as manuscripts containing the earliest words written in Spanish has been officially recognised. The first utterings of Spanish continued in the "Silos Glosses", recorded in the Burgos monastery of Santo Domingo de Silos.

=== Cuisine ===
Burgos province is famous in gastronomy for:

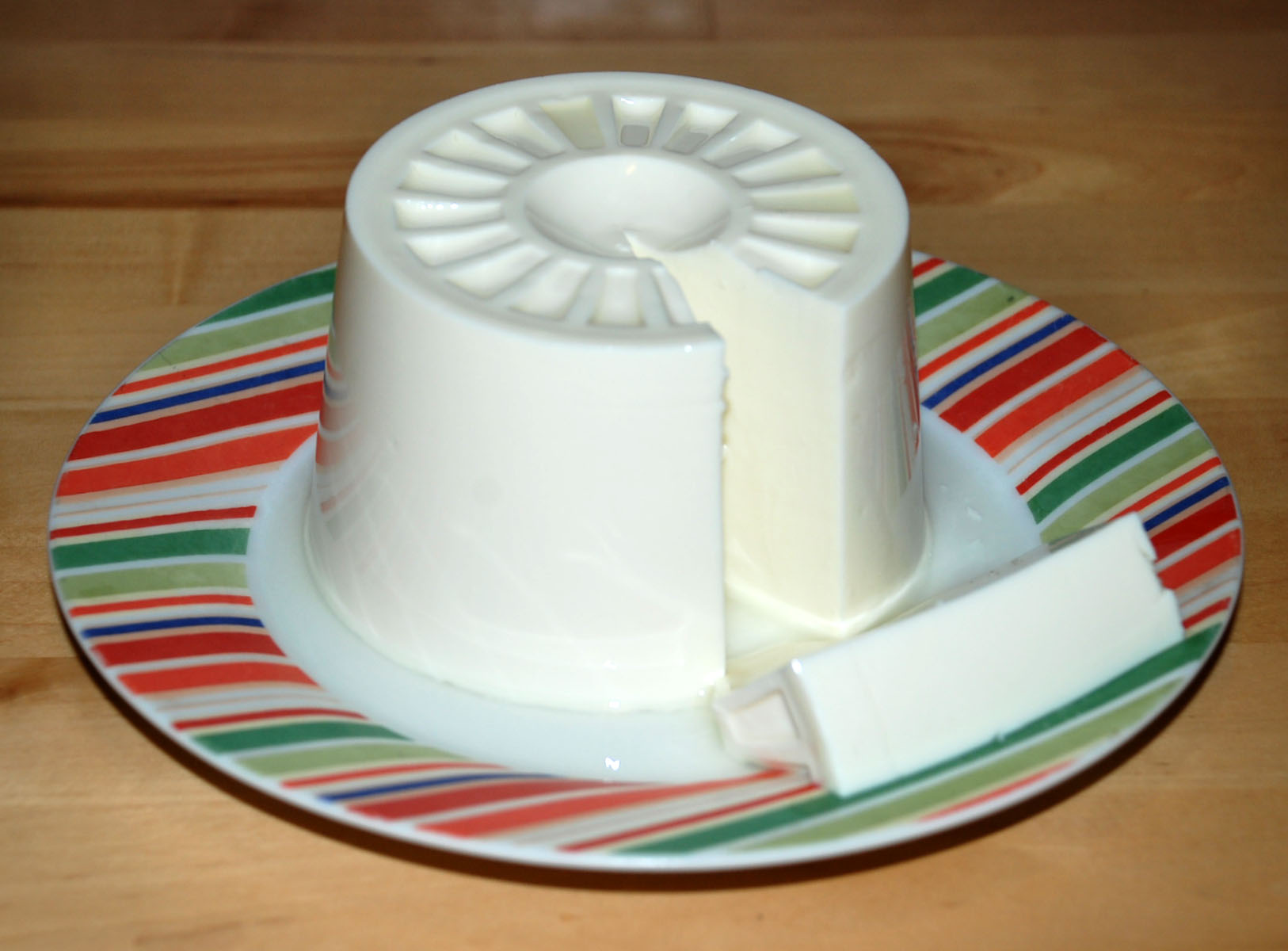
Queso de Burgos

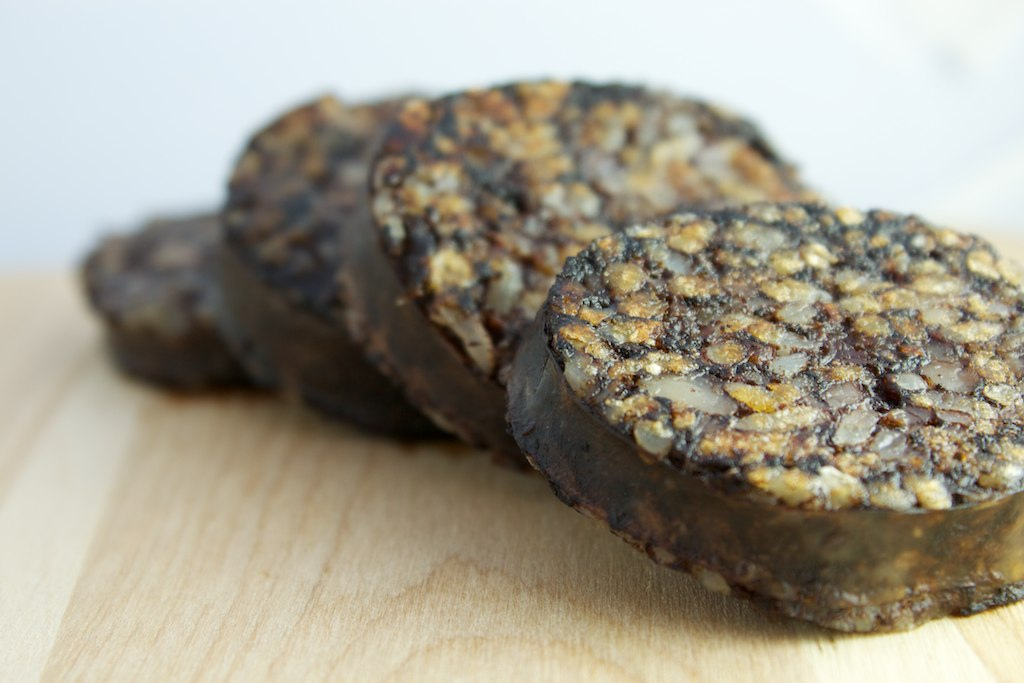
Fried slices of morcilla de Burgos

Queso de Burgos, a white cheese which is soft and unctuous (because it is made with whey). Although originally made with sheep's milk, now cow's milk or mixtures are more common. Each comarca (rural district) produces a minor variation, and the major dairies produce an industrial product that is acceptable for people with sensitive digestion.

Burgos is blessed with a moderate climate and this fresh cheese was able to be conserved there without the need for curing of more than 10 days. With the improvement of aseptic industrial production processes this can be extended to about 30 days at a cool 6 °C. Its production reaches 35,000 tons annually.

Morcilla de Burgos, a pig's-blood sausage (black pudding), is a staple country food known across the Iberian peninsula. Spiced with onions and herbs its most noticeable content is rice (often mistaken for fat) which makes it one of the lightest and healthiest products of its kind. Oral tradition says that it must be "salty, smooth and piquant" (see Spanish pages Burgos (desambiguación) for details). As with the Queso de Burgos, several comarcas or towns in the province (Cardeñadijo, Sotopalacios, Aranda de Duero, Briviesca, Covarrubias, Villarcayo, Trespaderne, Miranda de Ebro...) made their own morcillas, with minor variations between them.

Even though Burgos is not on a D.O. wine is a fundamental piece in local gastronomy thanks to nearby wine cellars from Ribera de Duero, Rioja and Arlanza D.O.

=== Festivals ===
The city's main festival is San Pedro y San Pablo (also referred to locally as "Sampedros") celebrated on June 29. Every year, for about two weeks, the city celebrates with fireworks, concerts, sports, folklore, games for children, theater and other activities.

== Economy ==
Burgos is one of Spain's richest cities, with a GDP above the Spain average. It is an important trade and tourist center with a sizeable manufacturing base.

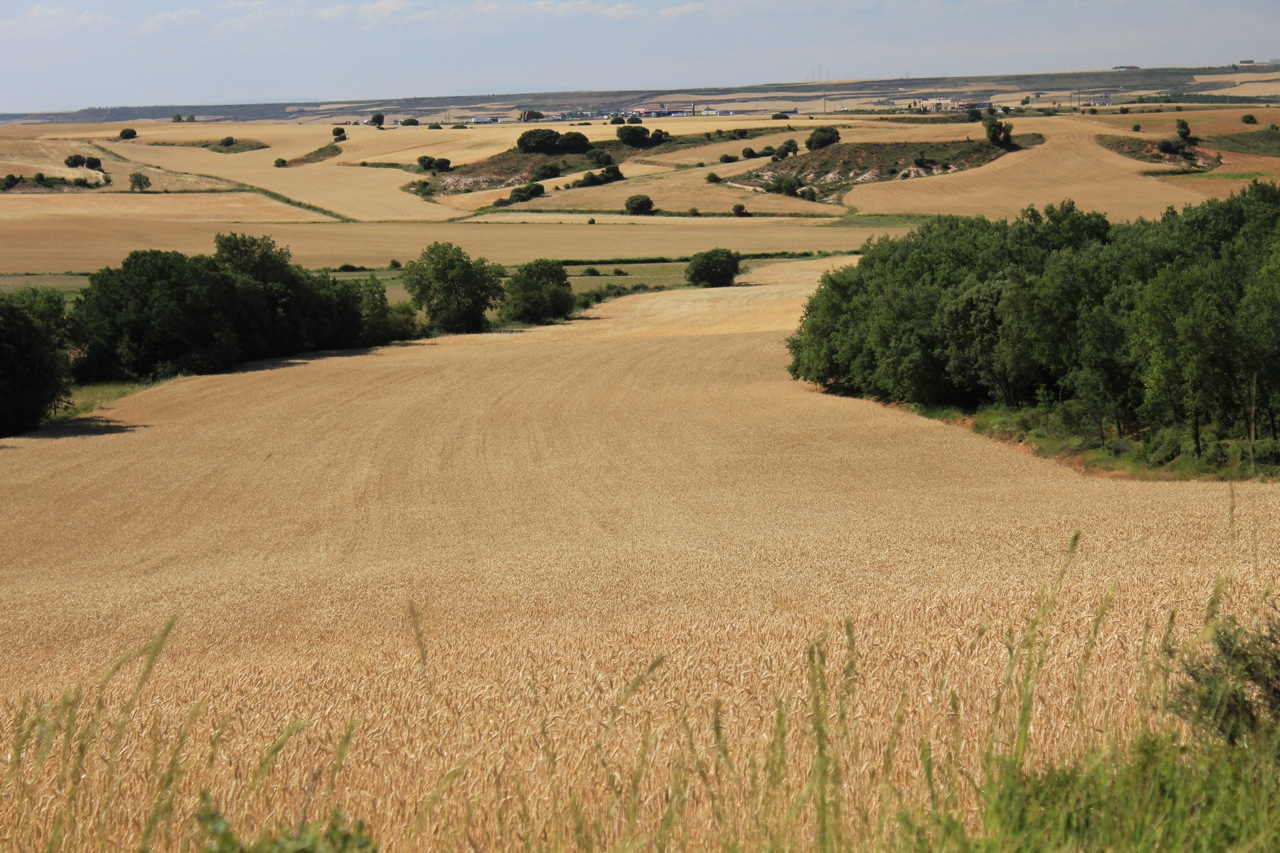
Wheat fields in the outskirts of Burgos

=== Agriculture ===
Wheat is a major crop. The city is surrounded by wheat fields.

=== Secondary sector ===
Burgos is a very industrial city, with a secondary sector widely developed. The city has the biggest industrial park of north Spain, called Villalonquéjar.

The city is the headquarters of Grupo Antolin, designer and manufacturer of interior automotive components.

It is also the headquarters for south Europe Benteler International.

=== Tertiary sector ===
It employs the bigger percentage in the city and is represented by the public sector (production, delivery and allocation of goods and services), due to the capital status.

== Transport ==
=== Air ===
Burgos Airport is located only 5 km (3.11 mi) from the city centre, which only provides seasonal flights to Palma de Mallorca that are operated by Iberia. Other nearby airports are Valladolid Airport, located 134 km (83.26 mi) south west, Bilbao Airport, located 176 km (109.36 mi) north east and Madrid–Barajas Airport, located 230 km (142.92 mi) south of Burgos.

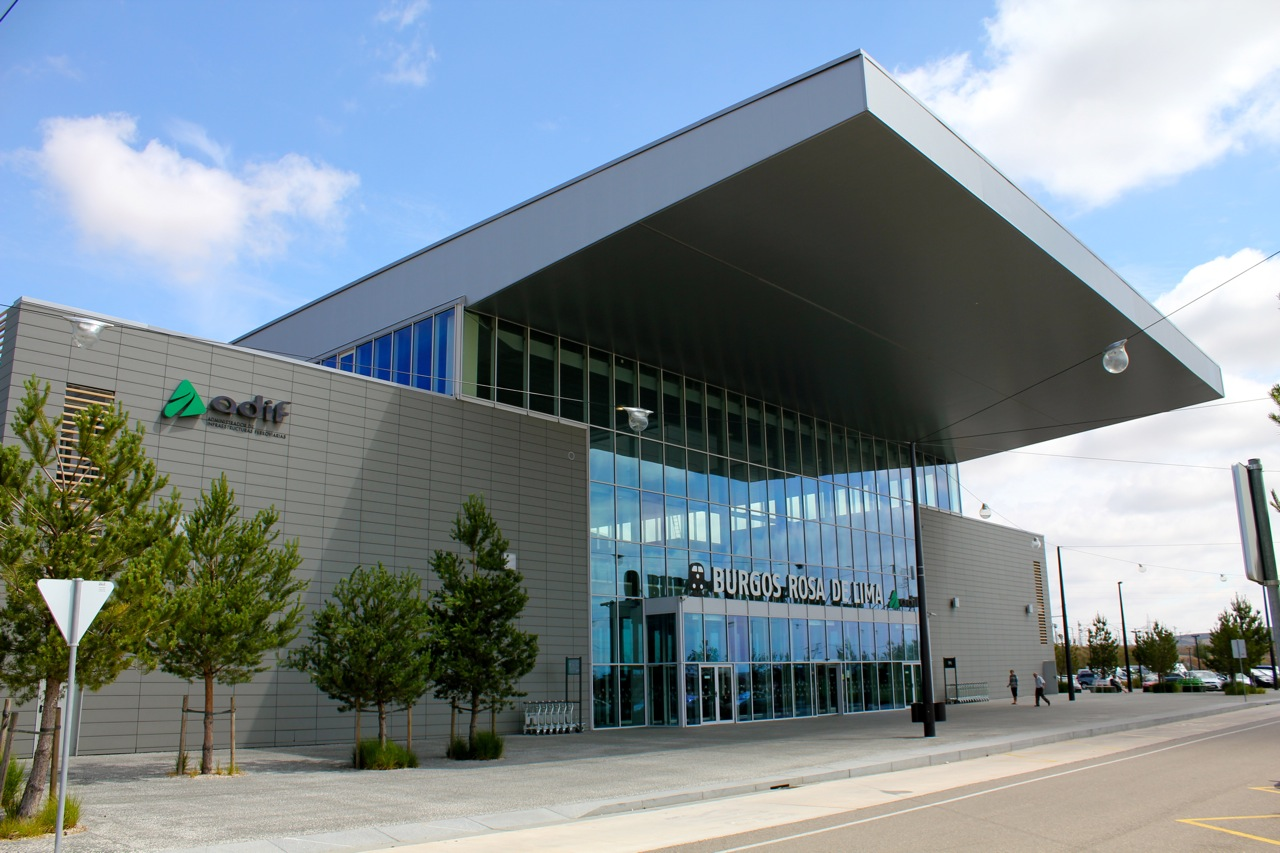
Burgos Rosa Manzano train station

=== Railway ===
Map of the Spanish high-speed railway network

The city is considered a first-class rail route through which one rail lines circulate, operated by Renfe: Madrid–Hendaye railway. The faster trains use the AVE line between Madrid and Valladolid.

2010 marked 150 years since the arrival of the first railway to the city; the first train was present on 25 October 1860. Madrid was joined with the French border and this was considered the main route of railway communication between Spain and Europe. Located at the halfway point, Burgos soon become an important hub of communications between the centre and the north.

Since December 2007, the city has been connected to the main provincial capitals by high-speed service Alvia. It also provides other services, middle and long distance, which connect with the main population centres of the country. 18 long distance trains and 12 middle distance trains circulate through the station each day, which results in around 330,000 yearly users.

The new railway station was opened on 12 December 2008 under the name Burgos-Rosa de Lima, belonging to ADIF. It is located in the neighbourhood of Villímar, northeast of the city, and was adapted for the arrival of AVE. Bus 25 takes travellers direct to the city centre.

In July 2022, AVE high speed trains started serving the city, connecting it to cities such as Madrid in 1 hour and 33 minutes with a stop in Valladolid, or Bilbao in 70 minutes. Starting in January 2023, AVE will connect Burgos to Valencia in 3 hours and 30 minutes without the need to transfer in Madrid.

=== Trams ===
A project to implement a tram for the city has been planned, which would run the length of the Boulevard, officially called the Avenida de Valencia. It would consist of a line of about 12 km (7 mi) long and will originate from the Burgos-Rosa de Lima railway station and end at the University of Burgos. Its cost is estimated between 80 and 120 million euros.

Due to the economic crisis and real estate, the project has been postponed temporarily until further funding becomes available. In February 2010 work began on the development of the Boulevard, which reserves a lane for public transport: first buses, and eventually the tram.

=== Bus ===
Burgos has an international bus station located in the city centre, just one hundred meters from the Cathedral. It connects the city with nearly every region of Spain, as well as with a wide number of European (Amsterdam, Basel, Bern, Bratislava, Brussels, Cologne, Hamburg, Frankfurt, Geneva, Gdańsk, Kyiv, Lisbon, Ljubljana, Lviv, Łódź, London, Lyon, Marseille, Moscow, Munich, Nice, Paris, Porto, Prague, Rotterdam, Sofia, The Hague, Warsaw, Zurich) and even North African (Casablanca, Marrakesh, Rabat) cities.

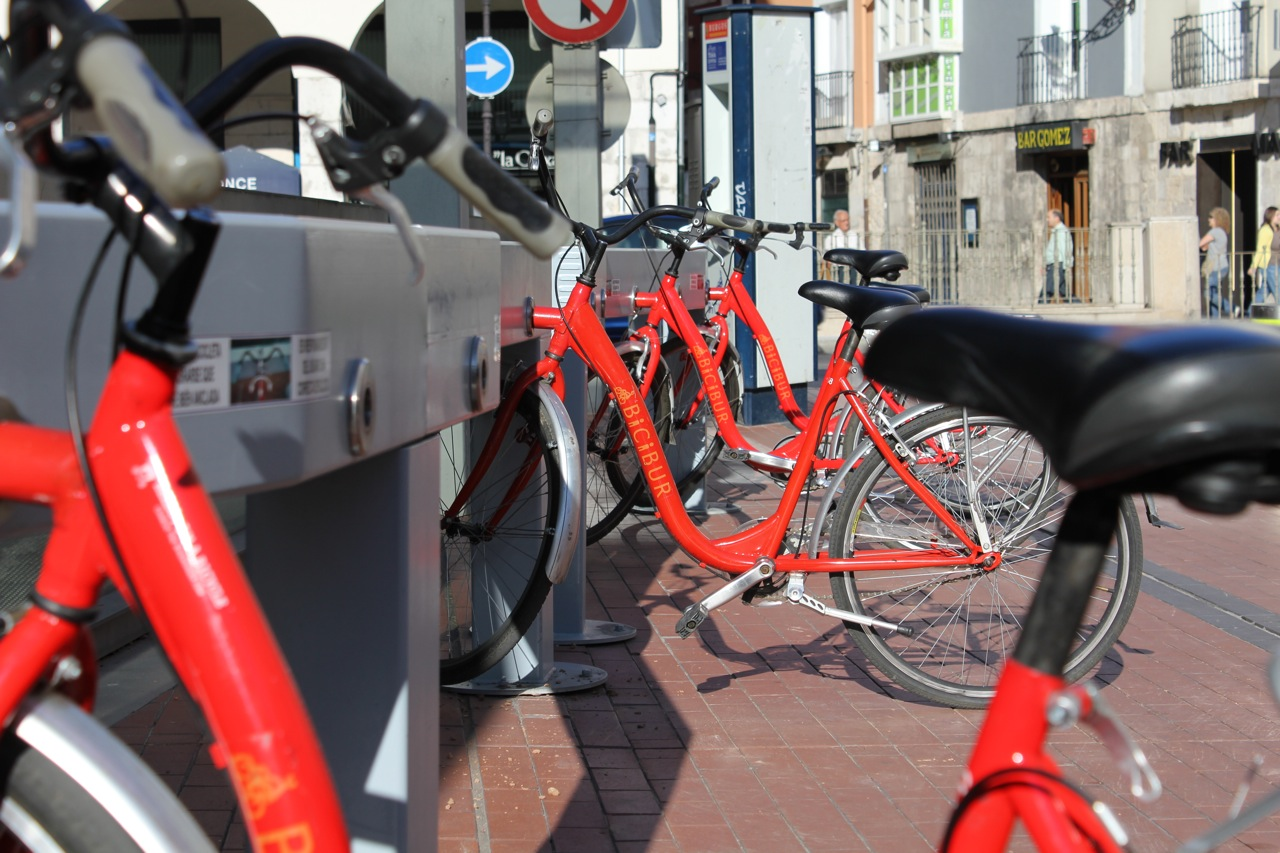
Bicibur

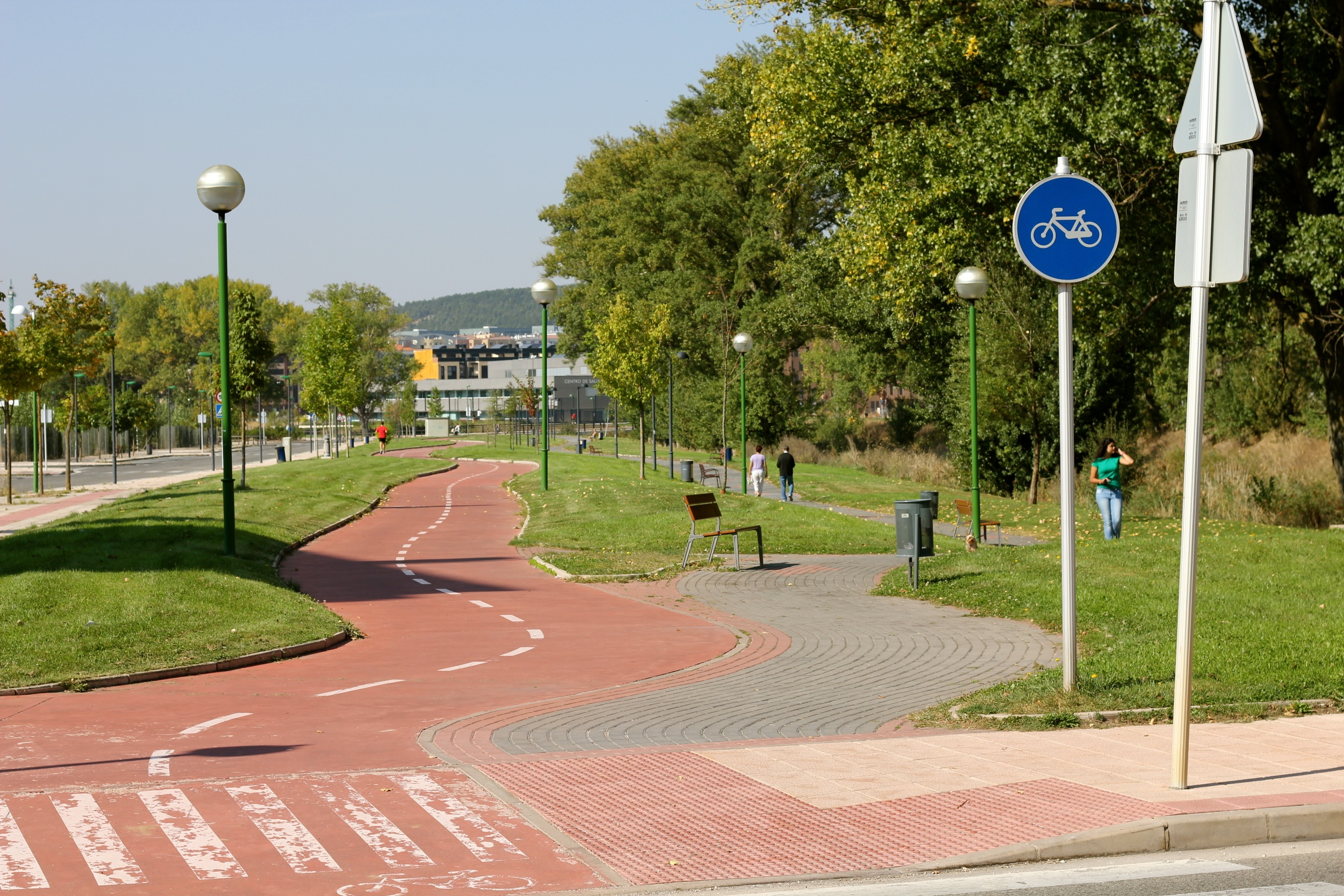
Burgos' city bike network

=== Bicycle ===
The city has its own public bicycle rental system, called Bicibur. It has been designed by a local company and has more than 20 points of distribution throughout the city. A network of over 100 km (62 mi) of bicycle lanes net the city making it the 6th largest bicycle lane network in Spain and the first in kilometres per resident.

== Sports ==
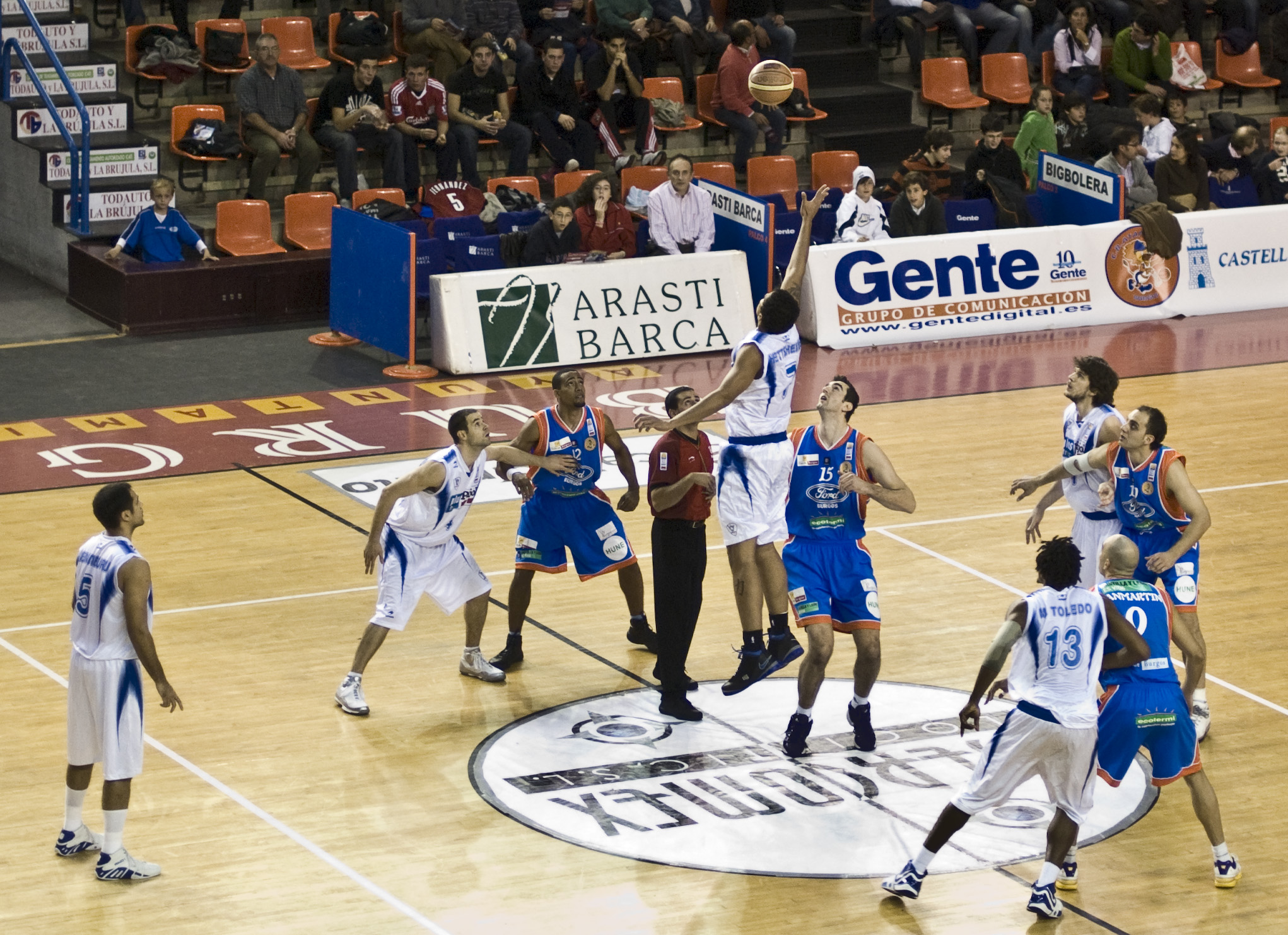
Basketball

The first football team in the city, Burgos CF, was founded in 1936, reaching the top division for six seasons in the late 1970s, before disappearing due to serious economic debts in 1983. It was replaced as the main football team of the city by its reserve team, renamed Real Burgos CF, which itself ceased to compete in 1994, after three successful seasons at the top flight. A new incarnation of Burgos CF was immediately refounded, but didn't start to compete until the 1994 season, in the sixth-tier Primera Provincial division. The team gradually transformed into professionalism, and since 2021 it plays in the second division of the Spanish football pyramid, hosting games at the El Plantío stadium.

The city has two professional basketball teams, CB San Pablo and CB Tizona, both playing (as of 2024) in the second division of the Spanish basketball league system.

== In popular culture ==
Segundo de Chomón filmed a short documentary about Burgos in 1911.

Scenes from The Good, the Bad and the Ugly were filmed near Burgos, which doubled for the Southwestern United States. The location called Sad Hill Cemetery (specifically in Santo Domingo de Silos), was where the last sequence of the film was shot.

Burgos is the setting for a scene in the 2010 film The Way, directed by Emilio Estevez and starring his father Martin Sheen.

== International relations ==
=== Twin towns – sister cities ===
Burgos is twinned with:

- Loudun, France
- Pessac, France

== See also ==
- Burgos Airport
- University of Burgos
- List of municipalities in Burgos
- Province of Burgos
