= Artieta =

Village in Burgos, Spain

- Minor Local Entity
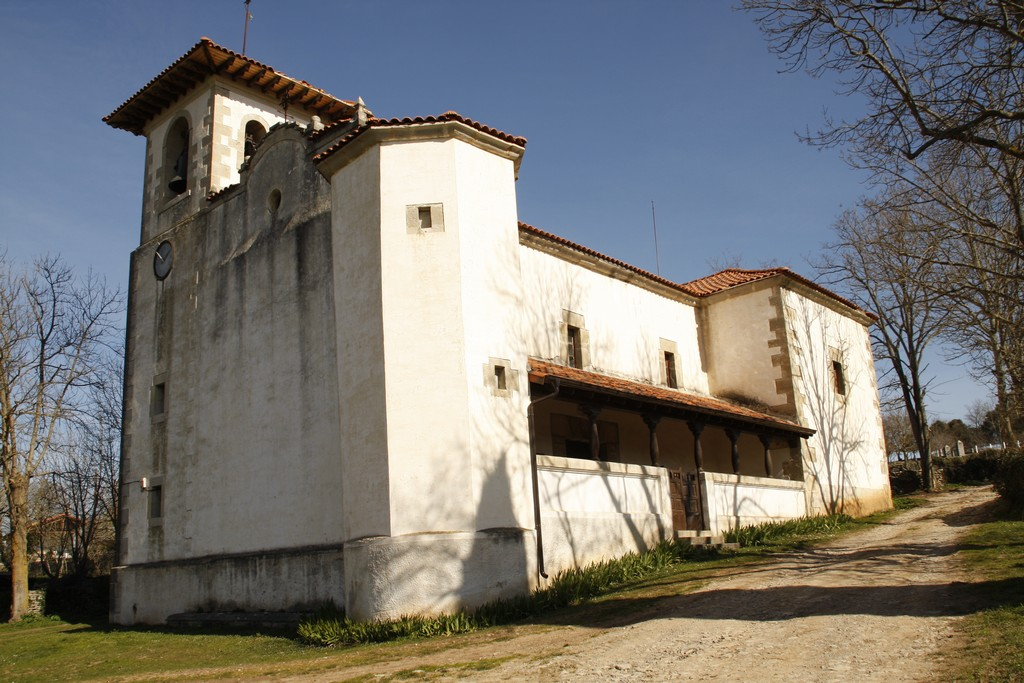
- Church of Artieta
- Interactive map of Artieta
- Coordinates: 43°06′57″N 3°11′16″W
- Country: Spain
- Province: Burgos
- Comarca: Las Merindades
- Municipality: Valle de Mena
- Elevation: 468 m (1,535 ft)

Population (2024)
  - Total: 9
- Postal code: 09588

Artieta (Spanish pronunciation: [aɾtjˈeta]) is a locality and minor local entity belonging to the municipality of Valle de Mena, inside the province of Burgos, autonomous community of Castile and León (Spain). It belongs to the comarca of Las Merindades and to the judicial district of Villarcayo de Merindad de Castilla la Vieja. According to the 2024 census (INE), Artieta has a population of 9 inhabitants.
