= Nela (river) =

River in Spain

Coordinates: 43°00′38″N 003°44′24″W

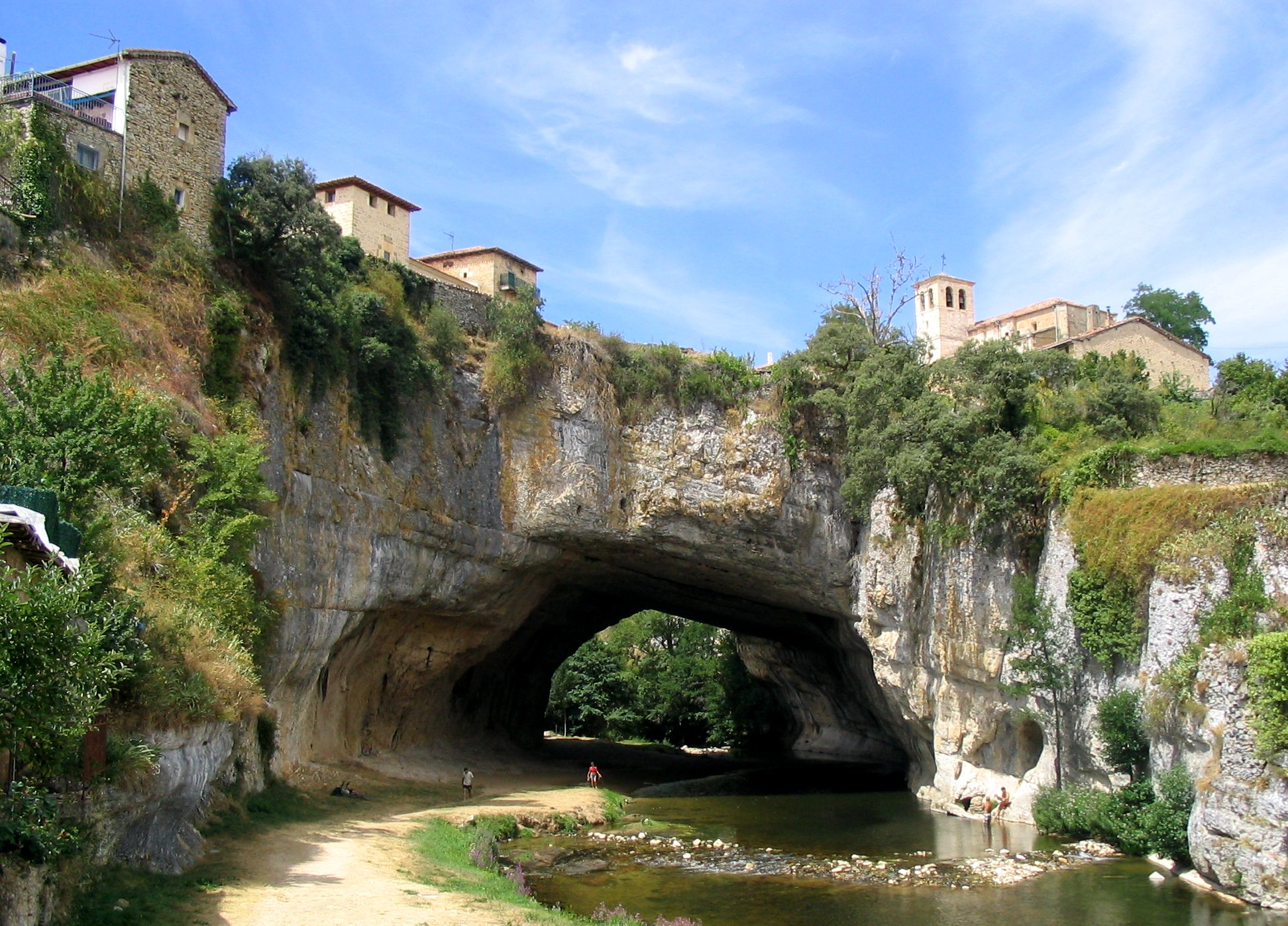
- A natural arch carved by the Nela River in Puentedey, Burgos Province

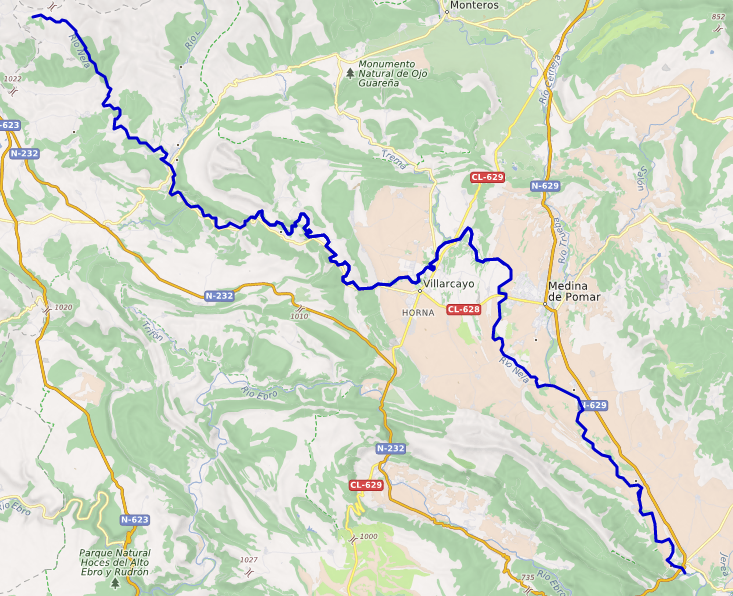

Location
- Country: Spain

Physical characteristics
- Source
  - location: Montes del Somo, Merindad de Valdeporres
  - elevation: ca 1,200 m (3,900 ft)
- Mouth
  - location: Ebro River
- Length: 75 km (47 mi)
- Basin size: 1,081.20 km^{2} (417.45 sq mi)
- Discharge
  - average: 16.70 m^{3}/s (590 cu ft/s)

Basin features
- Progression: Ebro→ Balearic Sea

The Nela is a river in northeastern Castile-Leon, Spain, one of the tributaries of the Ebro River. It has a watershed of 1081.20 km², with a total length of 75 km (47 mi).

The river has its source in the karstic hills of Montes del Somo, near Merindad de Valdeporres. Most of the Nela's water is drawn by the Trasvase Cerneja-Ordunte to supply water to Bilbao, as well as irrigation. There are fishfarms in Busnela and Pedrosa de Valdeporres, as well as a hydroelectric complex in Nofuentes. Finally the Nela flows into the Ebro near Trespaderne.

The amphibian Discoglossus galganoi, the fish Chondrostoma toxostoma and the snail Elona quimperiana are among the most common animal species found in the Nela river's waters.
