= Church of San Lorenzo de Vallejo de Mena, Burgos =

Church in Castile and León, Spain

Coordinates: 43°05′05″N 3°18′05″W

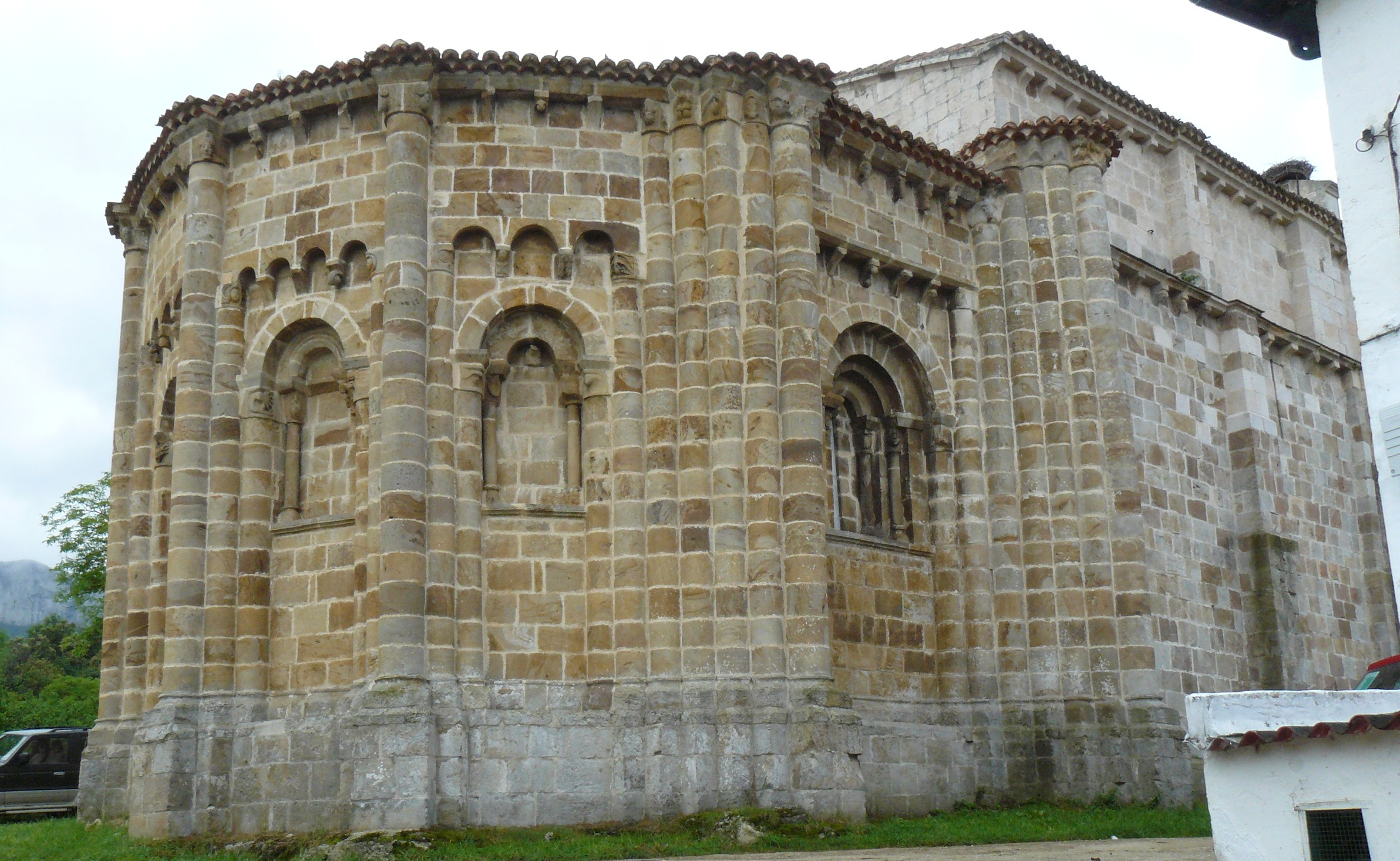
The church of San Lorenzo

The Church of San Lorenzo is located in Valle de Mena, a village in the Valley of Mena, part of the region of Las Merindades in the Province of Burgos, Spain.

The sources that support the dating of the church are limited. An inscription in the church likely dating from the early 13th century states that the site was donated to the Order of Saint John Hospitallers. The church was probably built in two phases; during the first one, in the last years of the 12th century, the apse was erected, while the second one, in the first quarter of the 13th century, resulted in the completion of the nave.

== The building ==
The building plan follows the standard Romanesque style, with a single apse on the eastern side and a basilical nave. The church has three entrances; the main one is located on the western façade, a second entrance opens on the south façade and a third smaller door is located on the northern side.

The western façade is decorated with a slightly pointed arch composed of four archivolts that are profusely decorated, mainly with vegetable motifs, fantastic animals and monsters. Each archivolt is supported on a carved capital atop a semidetached column.

The decoration of the apse is unusually complex. It is divided into five panels by a set of four semidetached columns topped by carved capitals. Each panel is decorated with a narrow window that is surmounted by an arcade consisting of three arches. The sculpture themes range from vegetal motifs to scenes with animals and human figures.

== The interior ==
The interior is richly decorated with sculptures in the capitals of the columns and the windows.

== Gallery ==
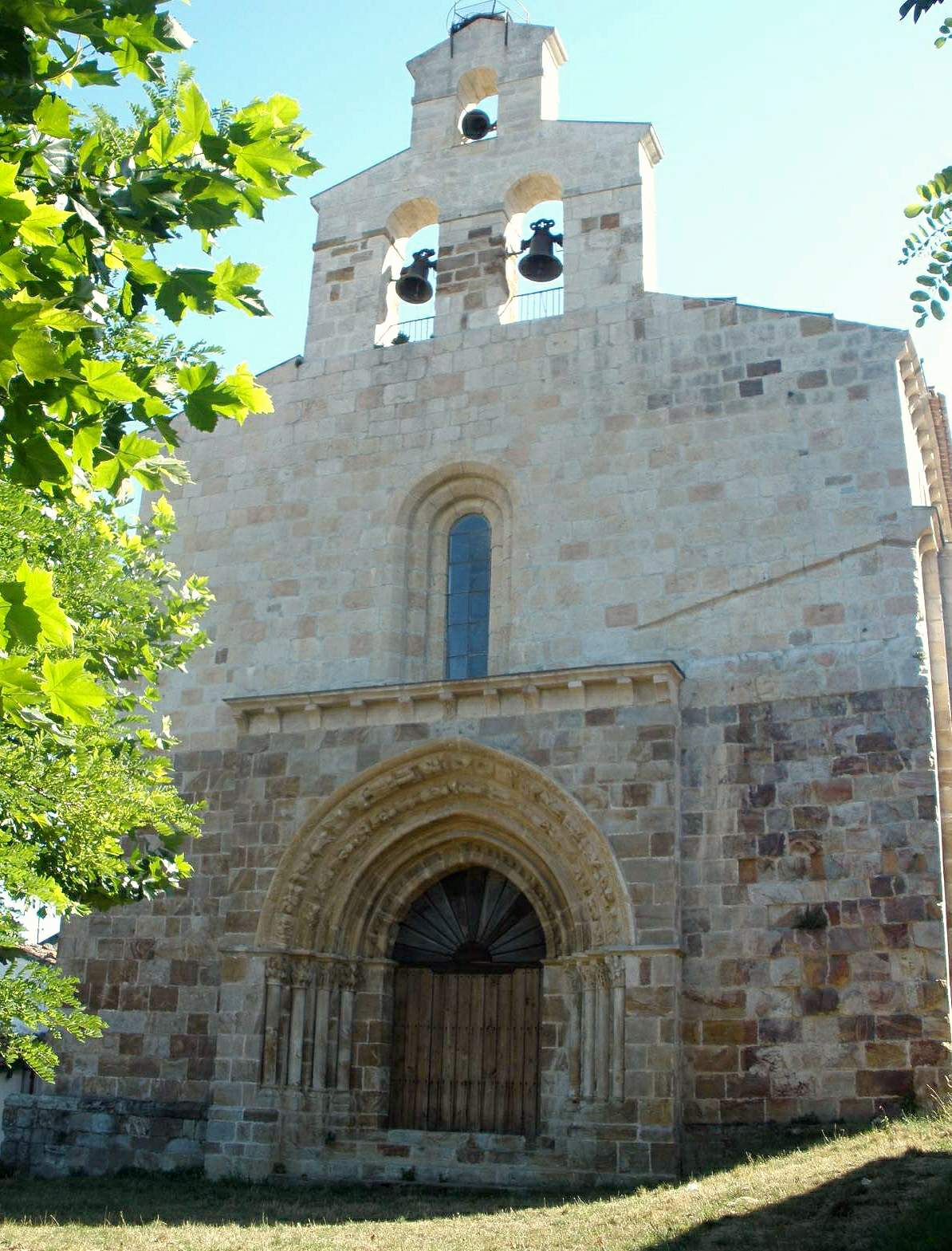
Main façade

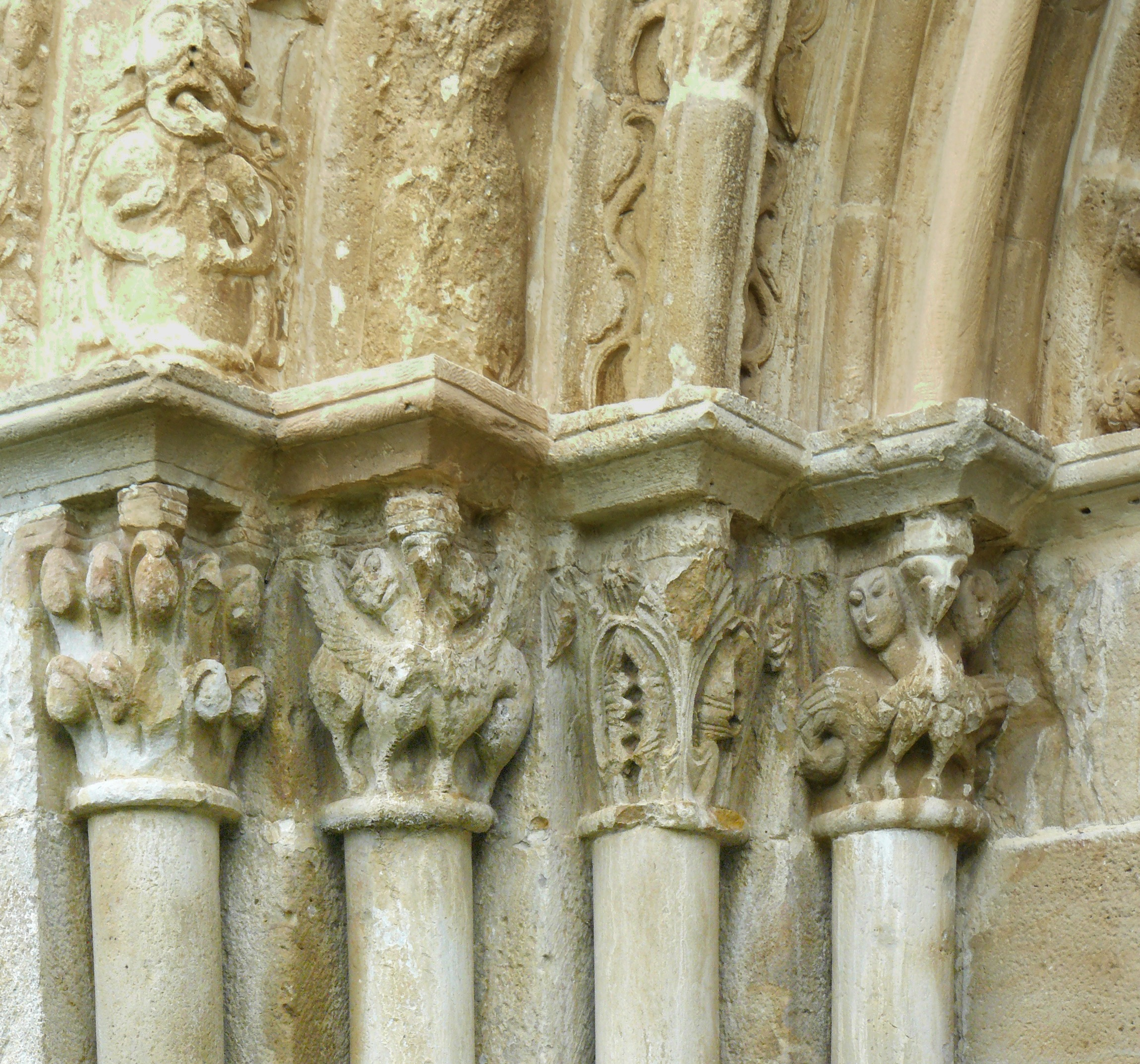
Detail of the main facade

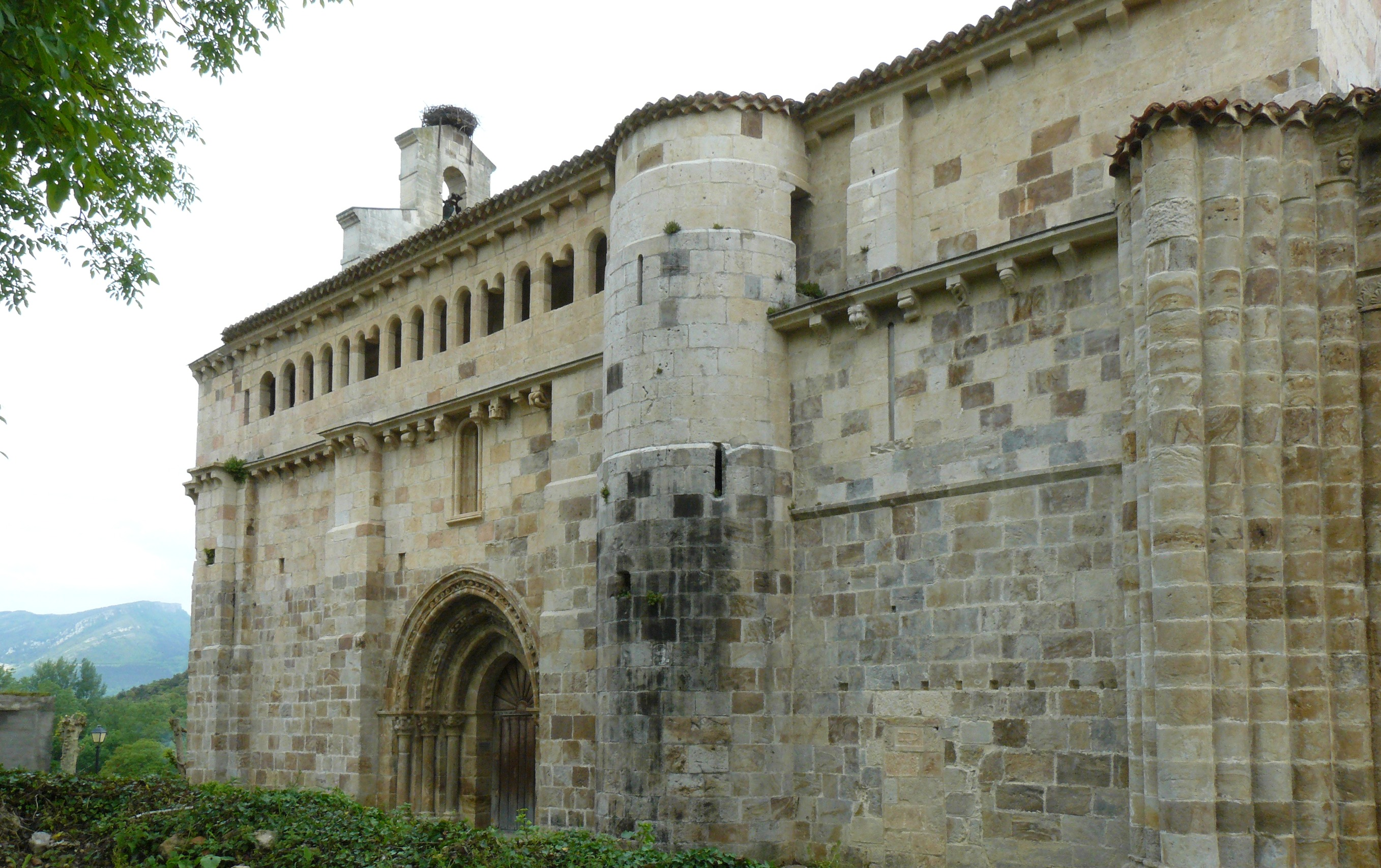
The southern facade

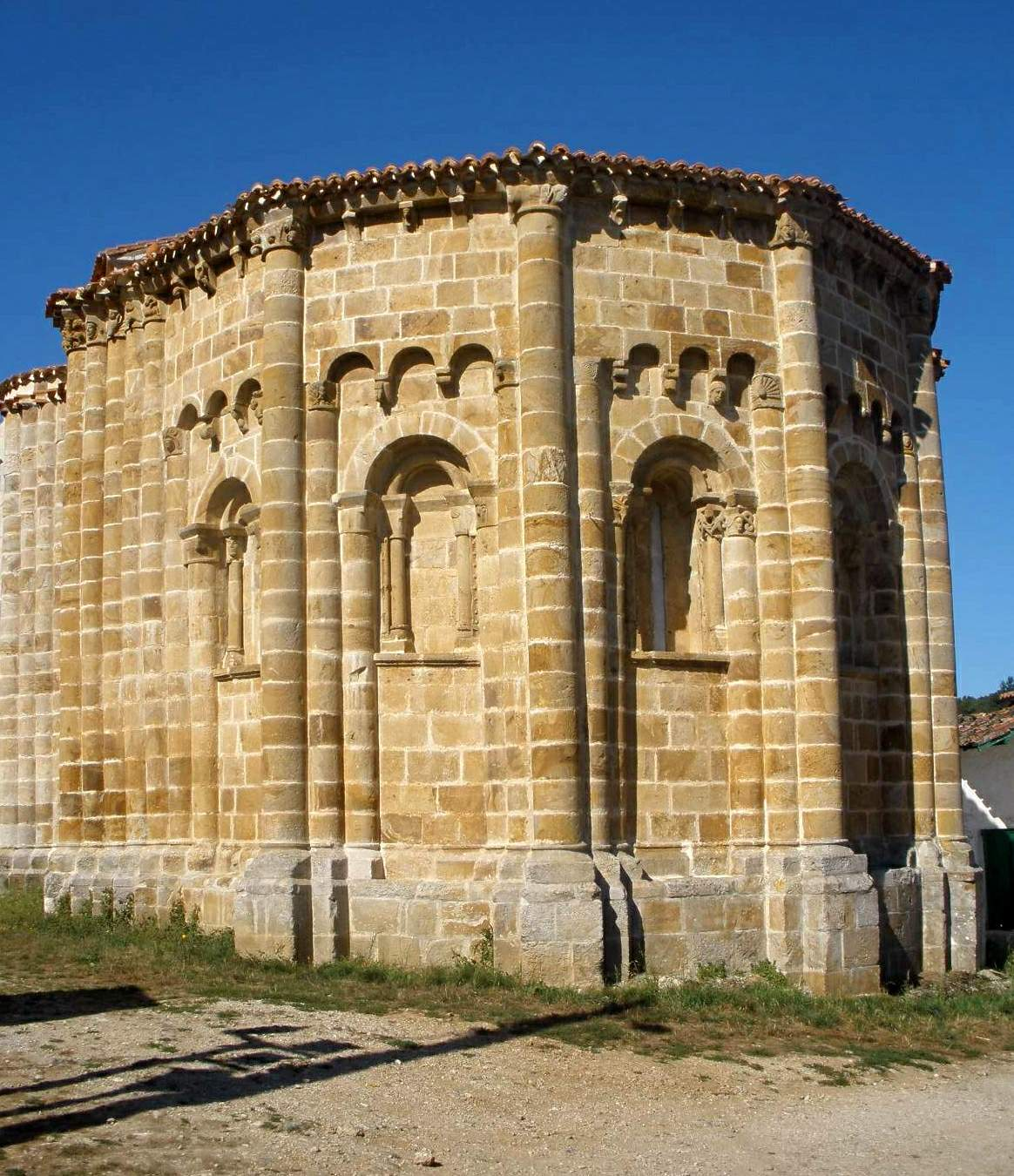
Apse

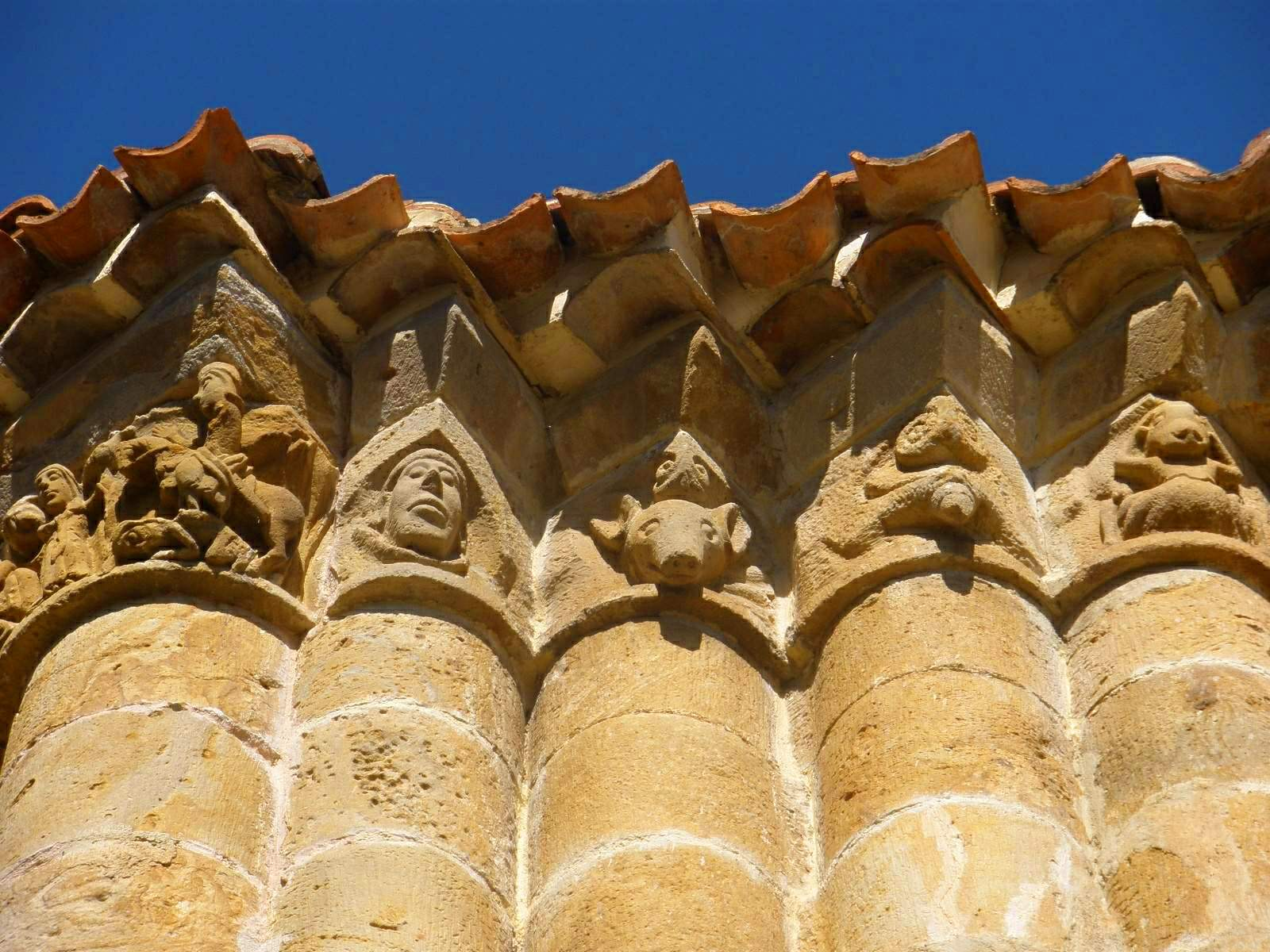
Decoration of the apse
