= Church of Santa Maria de Siones, Burgos =

Church in Castile and León, Spain

Coordinates: 43°04′02″N 3°19′08″W

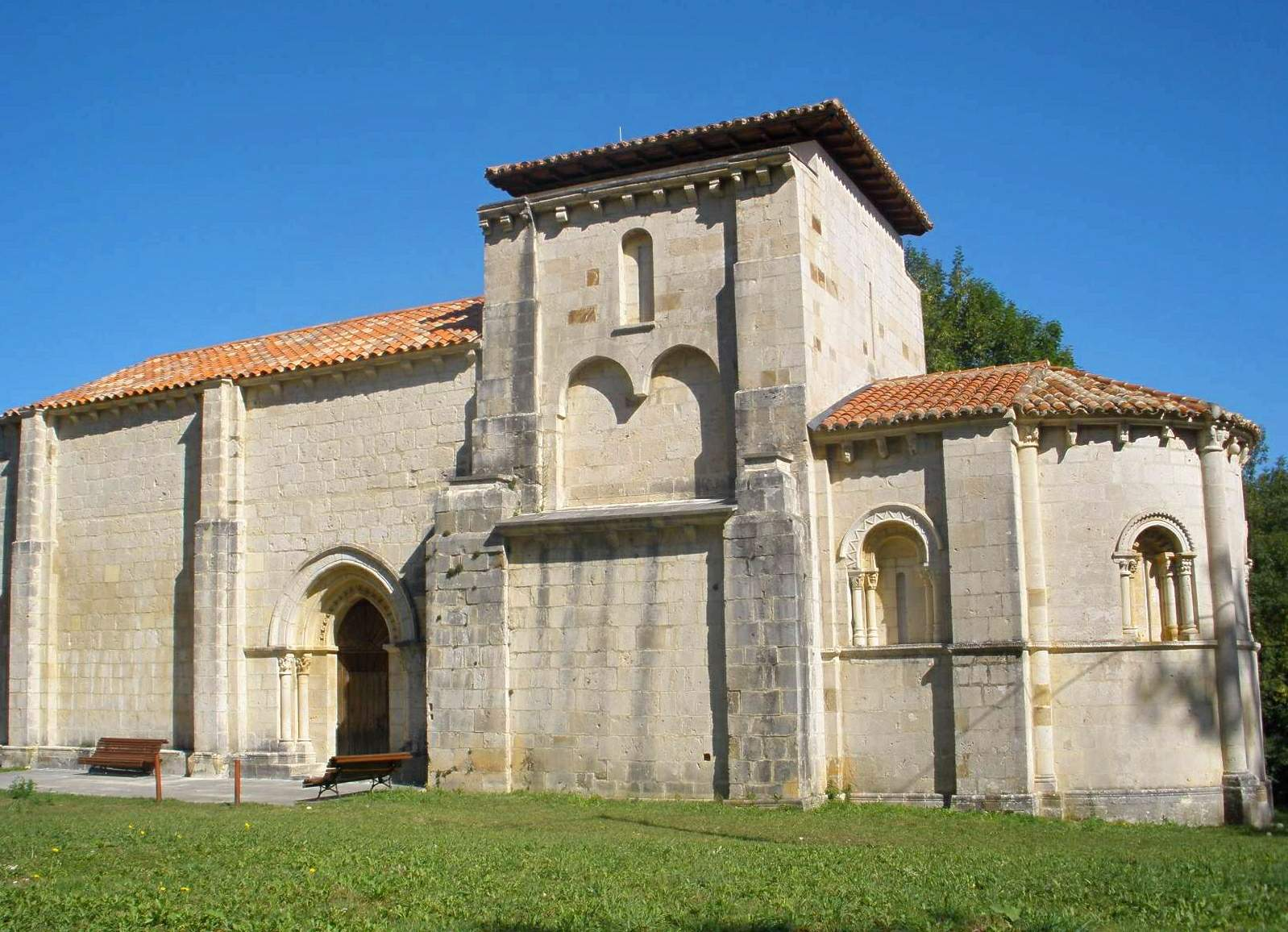
The church of Santa Maria de Siones

The Church of Santa Maria de Siones is located in the Valley of Mena, part of the comarca of Las Merindades in the Province of Burgos, Spain. The oldest reference to this church dates from 1001. The church was declared a Monumento nacional in 1931, and it is one of the most important and best preserved Romanesque churches of the Valley of Mena, despite the 19th-century restorations that altered its original scheme and replaced some of its sculptures with new statuary.

== The building ==
The building plan follows the standard Romanesque style, with a single rounded apse on the eastern side. The layout is basilical, with two small chapels on both sides of the main nave. There are two entrances to the church, one on the western façade and a second one on the south façade.

== The interior ==
The church's interior is richly decorated with sculpture that, although unrefined, is highly expressive.

In the southern chapel is a relief representing Santa Juliana pulling the hair of a kneeling devil. The capitals show a variety of motifs, mostly demons and fantastic animals. A hanging corbel is decorated with the charming head of a character that looks out over the border.

The northern chapel has a capital with a scene of fighting knights of good quality making. The other capitals also show scenes of fights, and a relief on the western side of the chapel probably represents Christ's temptations.

The apse is decorated with blind arcades on two levels. The columns, the arches and the capitals are richly ornated. Some show scenes from the Old Testament, such as Adam and Eve or the fight between David and Goliath. Others depict the harvesting of grapes, as well as various animals and monsters.

== Gallery ==
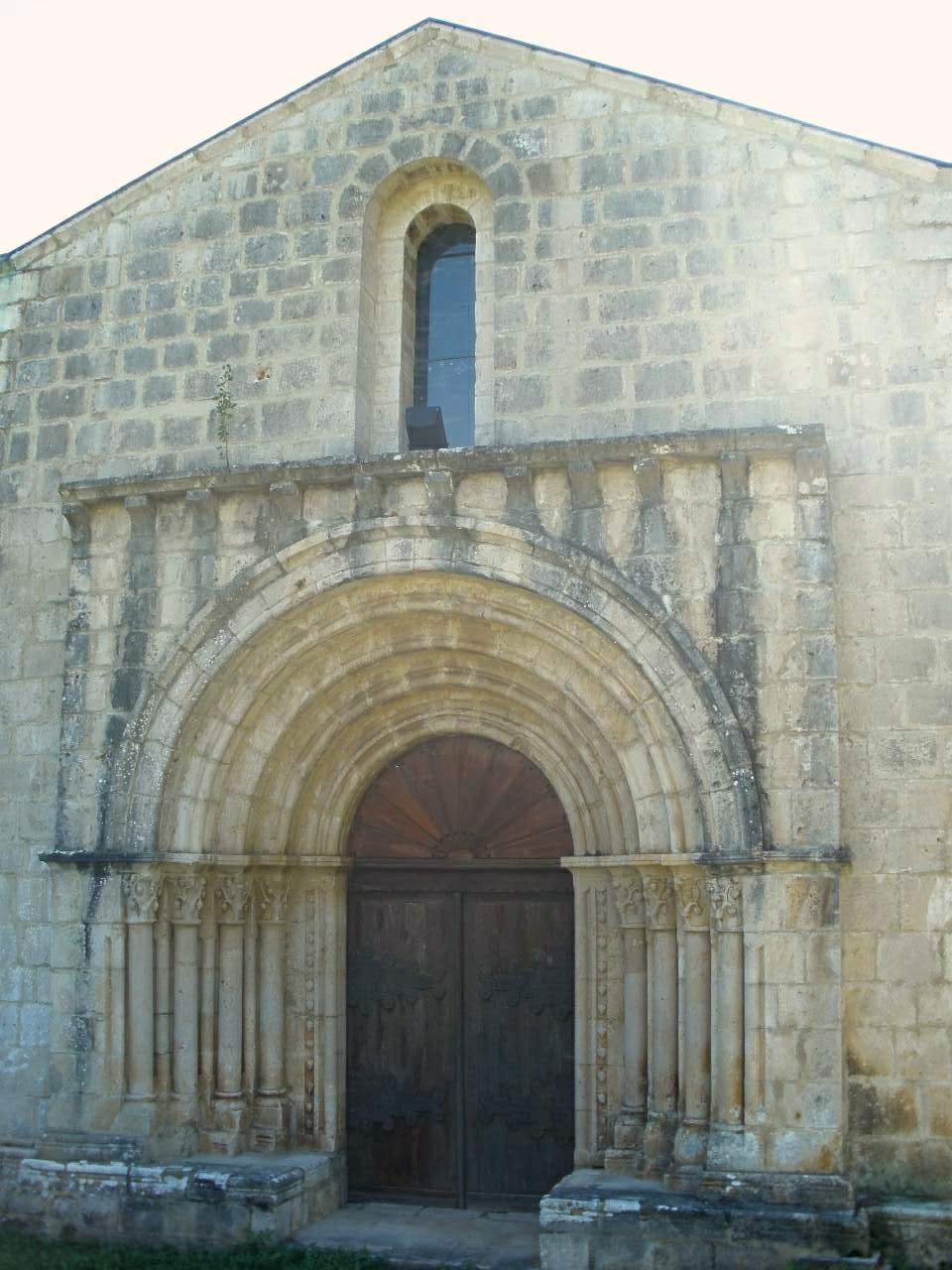
The western entrance

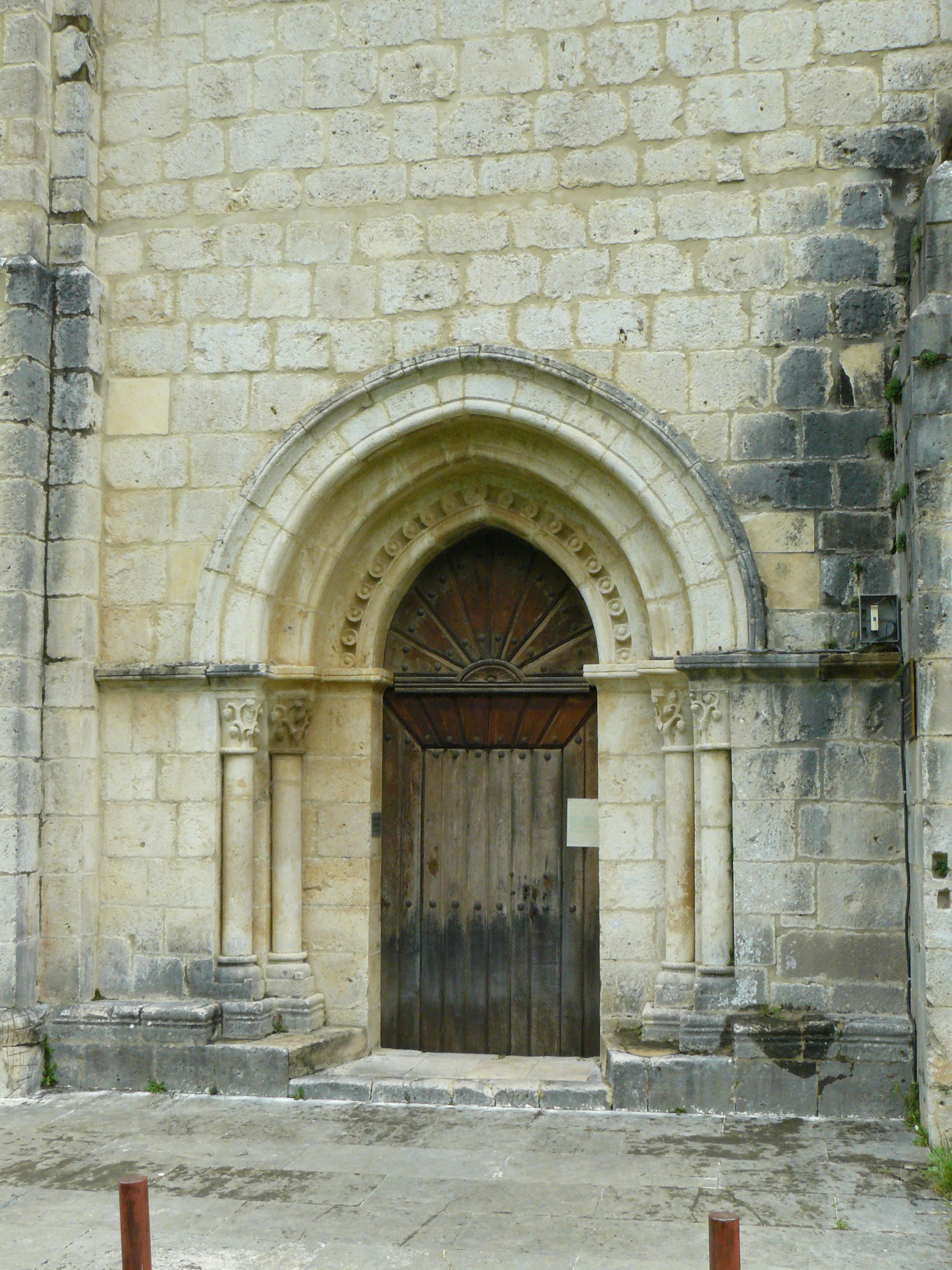
The southern entrance

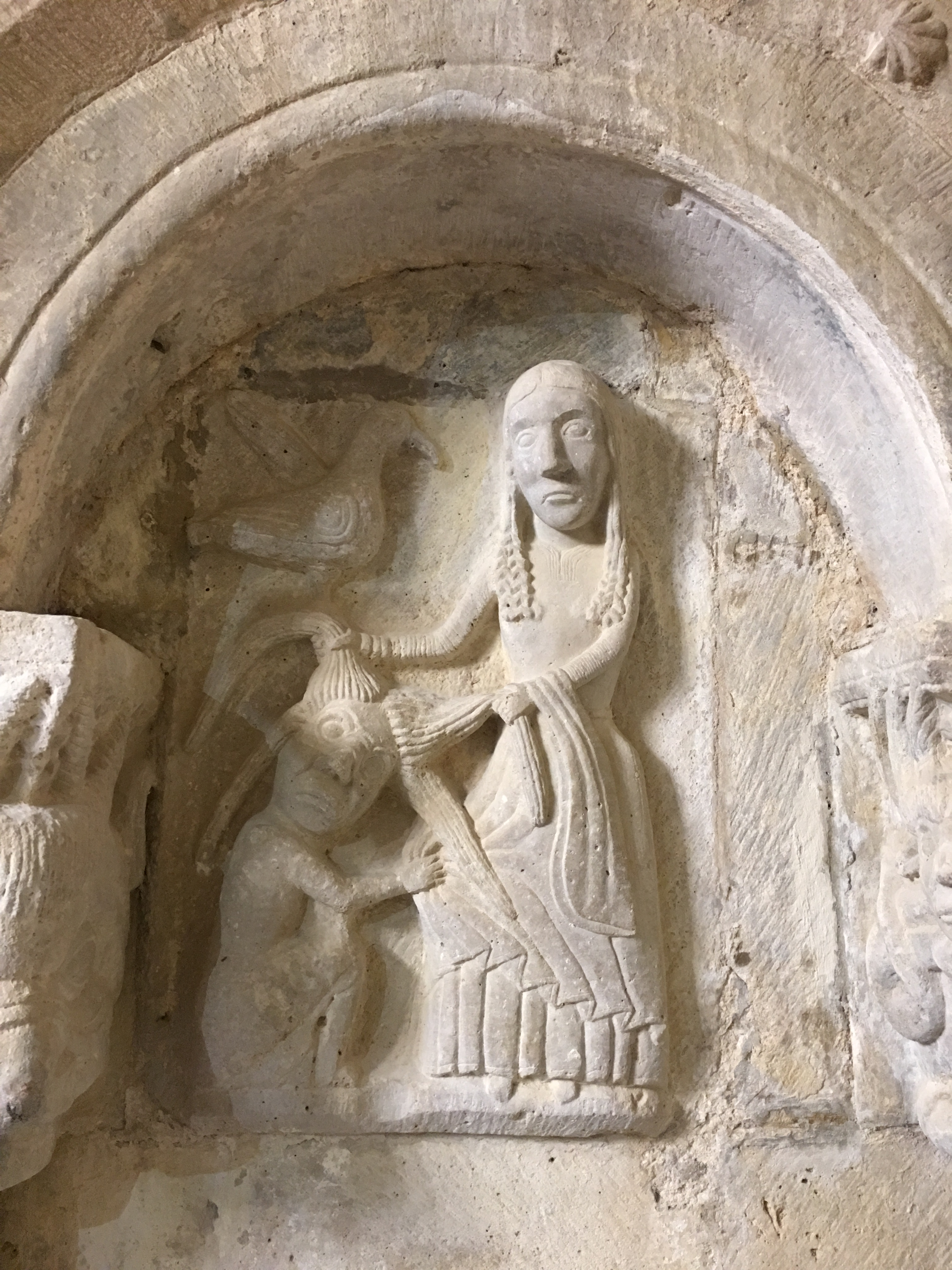
Santa Juliana fighting a demon

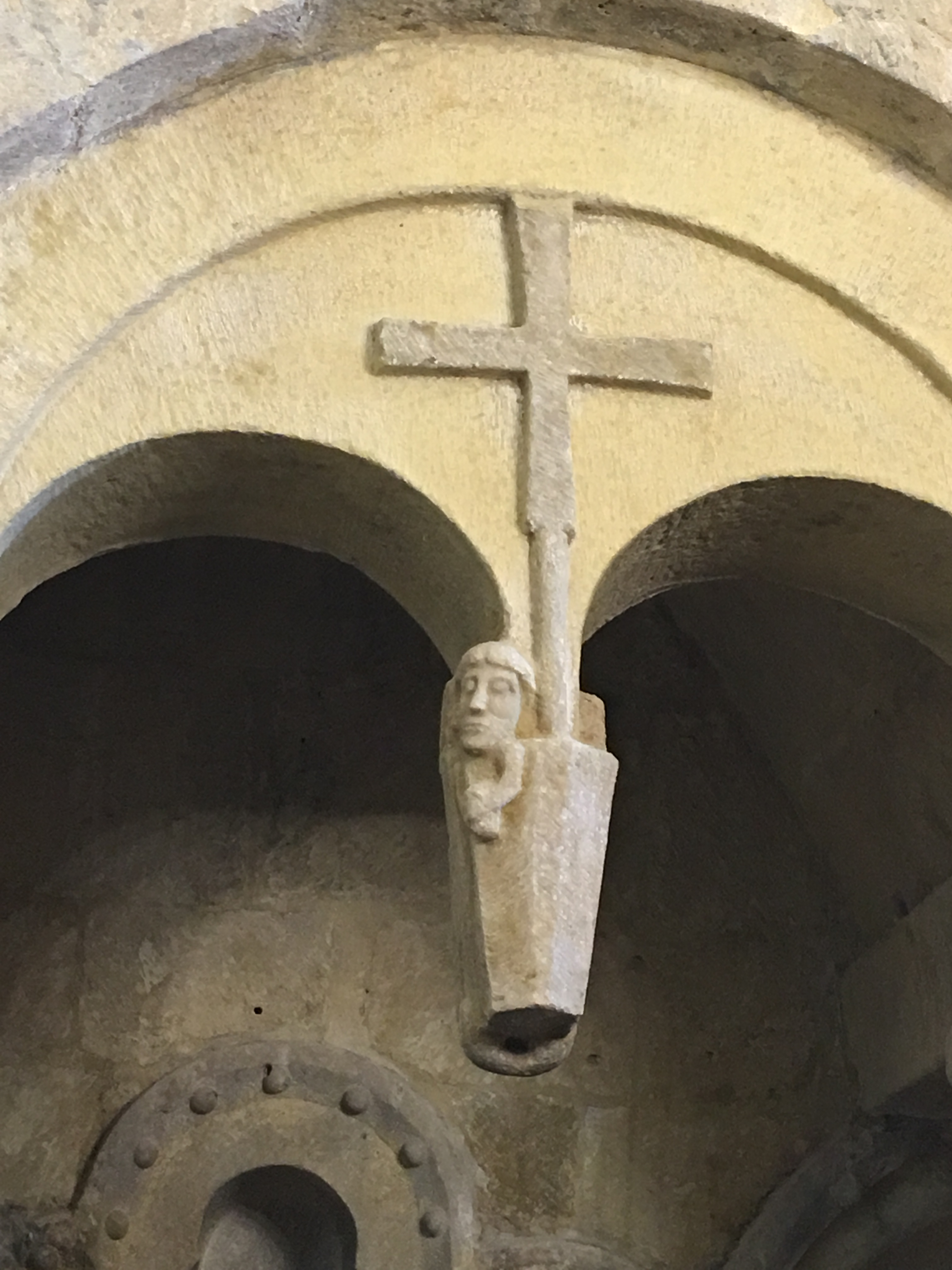
Hanging corbel

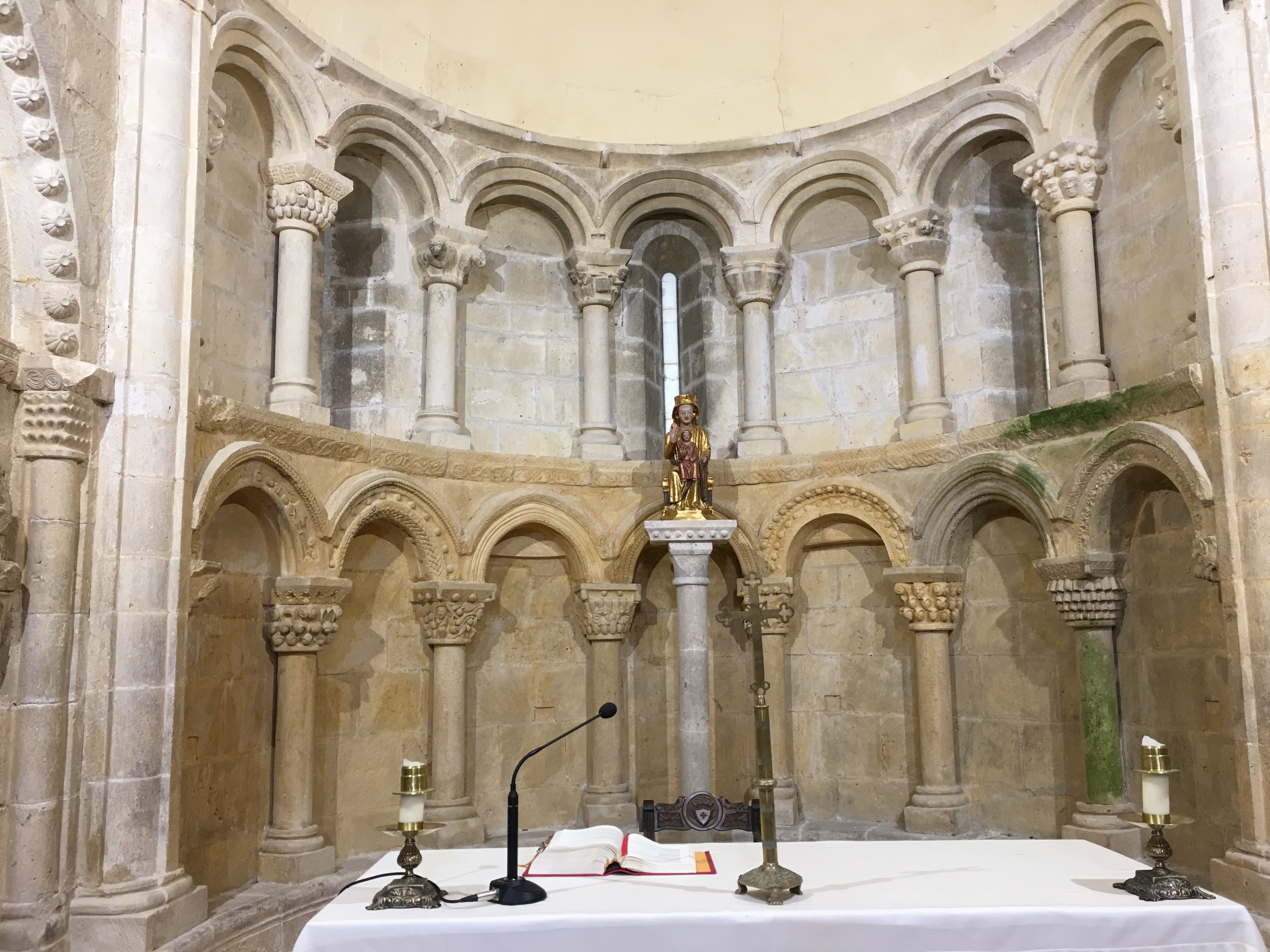
Apse interior
