= Nofuentes =

- Locality
- Interactive map of Nofuentes
- Country: Spain
- Autonomous community: Castilla y León
- Province: Burgos
- Municipality: Merindad de Cuesta Urria

Population (2011)
  - Total: 144

Nofuentes is a locality and a minor local entity situated in the province of Burgos, in the autonomous community of Castilla y León, in Spain, region of Las Merindades, judicial party of Villarcayo, capital of Merindad de Cuesta Urria municipality.

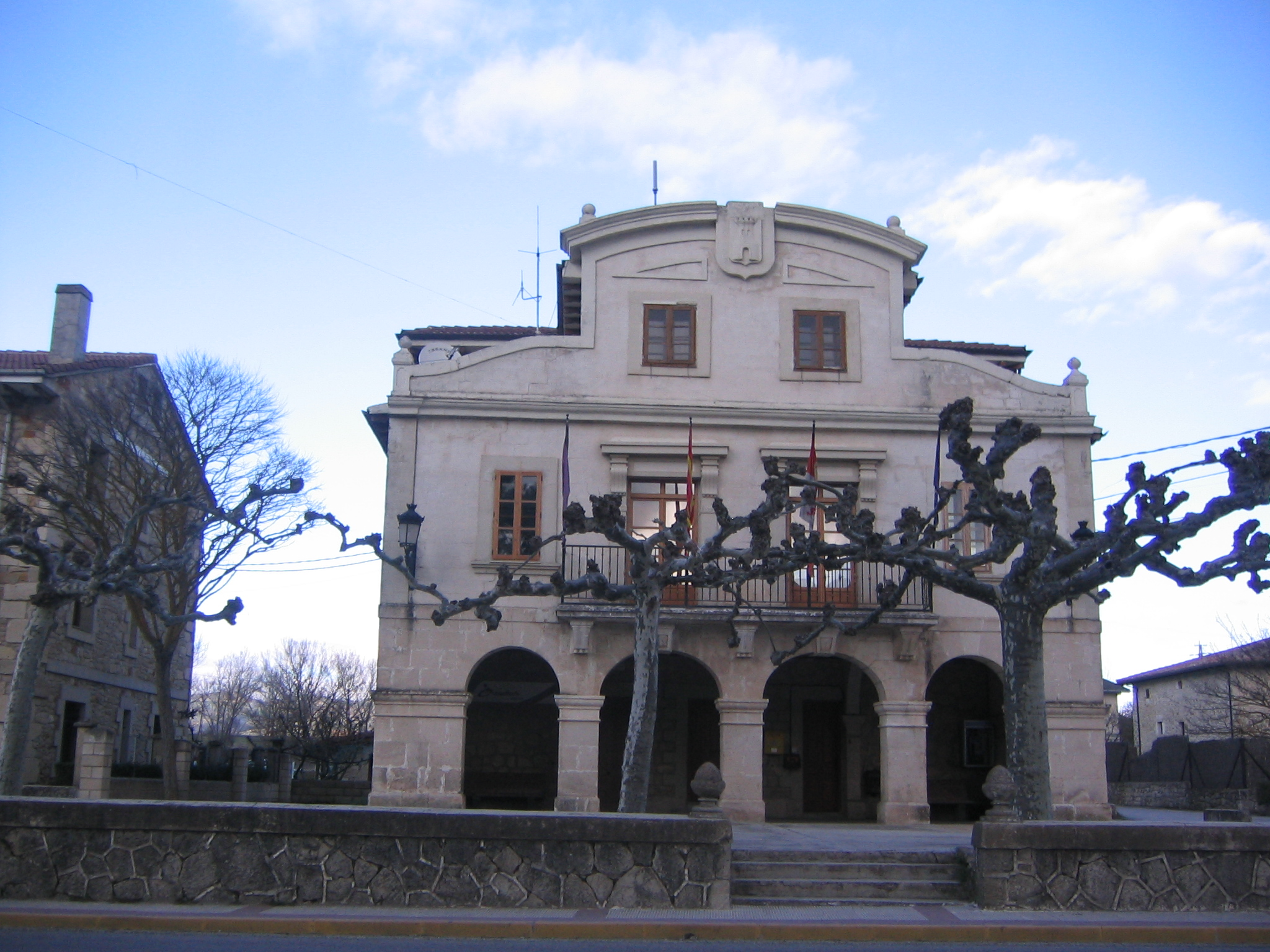
Town Hall.

== General data ==
In 2011 it hosted 144 villagers. It is situated 80 km to the north of the capital of the province, Burgos, in the left edge of Nela.

== Communications ==
- Road: National Highway N-629 between Trespaderne and Medina de Pomar.
- Railway: Until its closing in 1985, Railway station to Santander-Mediterráneo.

== Administrative situation ==
Its main mayor is José Pablo Quintanilla Rodriguez from Partido Popular.

== History ==
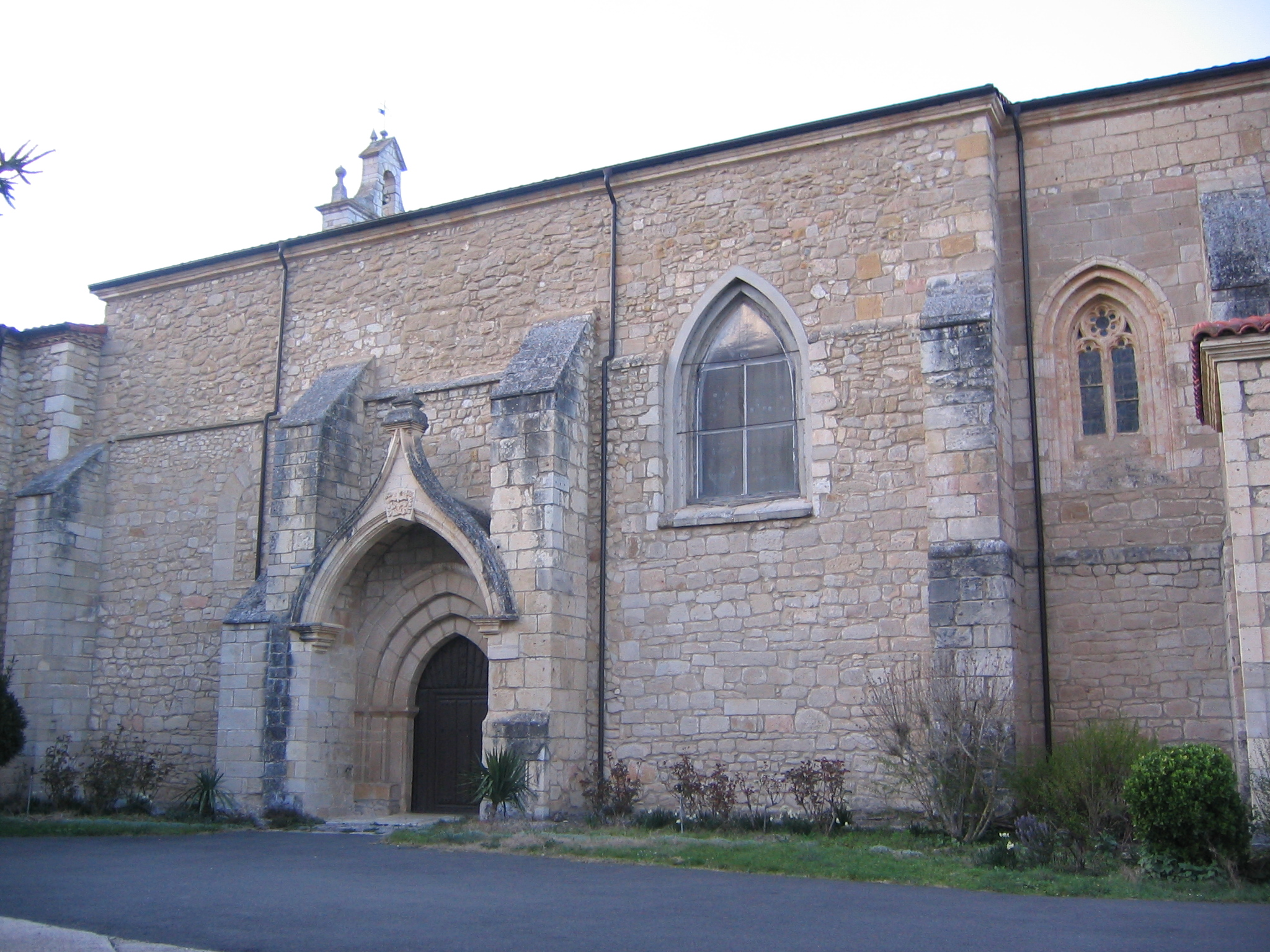
Clarisas´ convent.

This villa belonged to the Merindad de Cuesta Urria in Castilla la Vieja party, one of the fourteen parties that formed the Burgos´ quartermaster during the period between 1785 and 1833, as it is shown in the Floriblanca census of 1787 with a royal jurisdiction. After the fall of the Ancien Régime, it is aggregated to the Merindad Cuesta-Urria´s constitutional town hall, in the Villarcayo´s party belonging to the region of Castilla la Vieja, being its capital.

== Festivities and customs ==
Its local festivities are held 15 May, Saint Isidro Labrador festivity and 29 June, Saint Pedro and San Pablo de Tarso festivity

== Parish ==
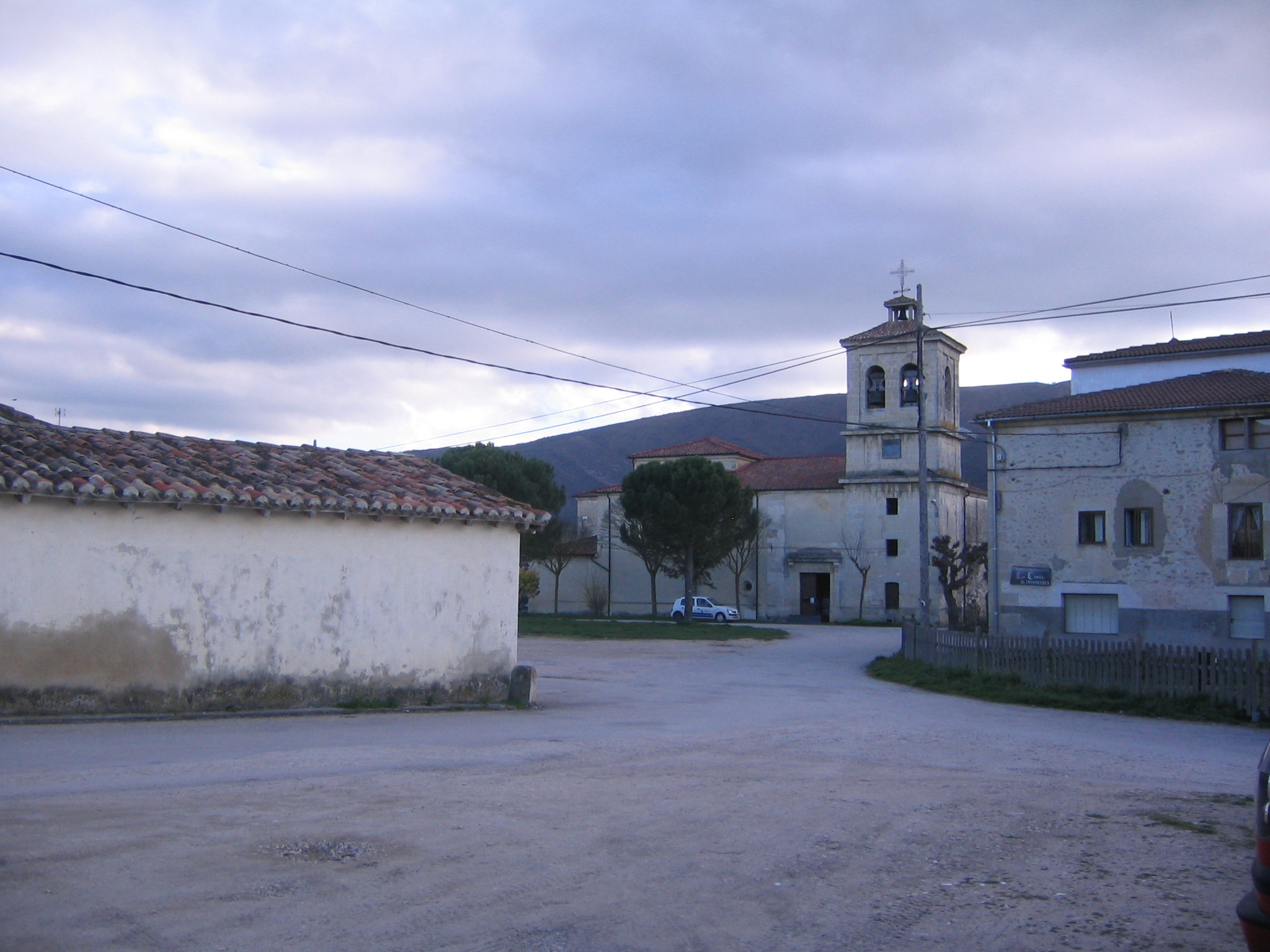
San Pedro y San Pablo Church.

Parochial catholic church of San Pedro and San Pablo in the Archpriesthood of Medina de Pomar, Burgos´ Archbishopric´s diocese. The next locations depend on this church: Cebolleros, Mijangos, Las Quintanillas Las Quintanillas, Urria (Burgos), Valdelacuesta, Villamagrín, Villapanillo, Villarán y Villavedeo y and the convent of mother Clarisas of Nuestra Señora de Rivas.
