= Manzanedo =

Manzanedo is a Spanish surname. Notable people with the surname include:

== People ==
- Alfonso Manzanedo de Quiñones (1552–1627), Roman Catholic prelate
- Gómez González de Manzanedo (–1182), Castilian magnate
- José Luis Manzanedo (born 1956), Spanish footballer
- Juan Manzanedo (1898–?), Spanish footballer
- Laura Manzanedo (born 1976), Spanish actress and presenter of radio

== See also ==
- Valle de Manzanedo, a municipality located in the province of Burgos
