= Alfoz (territory) =

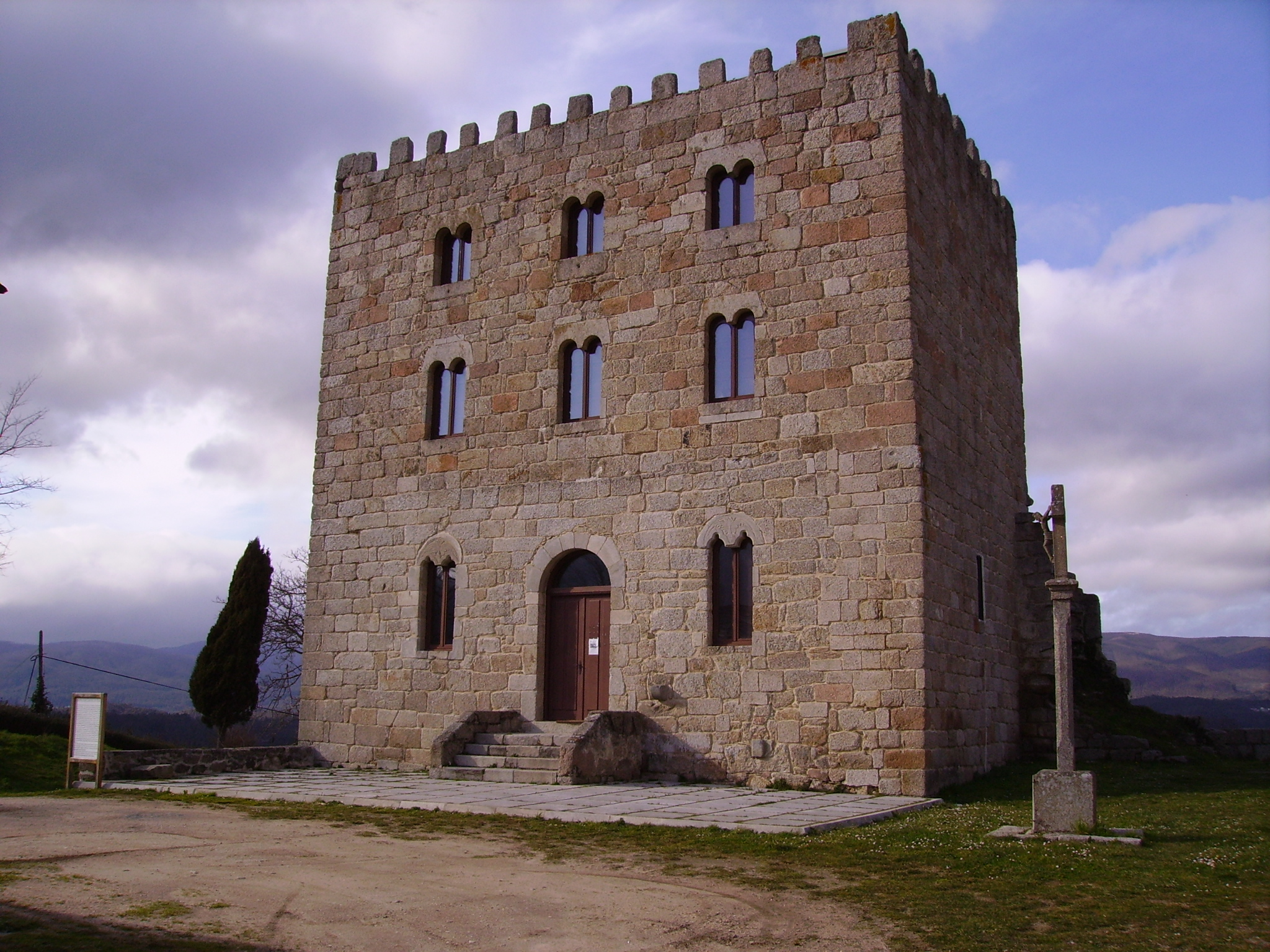
Pardo of Cela Castle in Alfoz. Castrodouro Castle in Alfoz.

The geographical term alfoz (plural alfoces) was used in the Iberian Peninsula during the Middle Ages to describe the rural territory, including subordinate hamlets, under the jurisdiction of a corresponding town (villa in Spanish). (Note: Not to be confused with villa, a type of residence.) The villa and its alfoz, under the authority of the town's local council (concejo), sometimes underpinned what was called a Comunidad de Villa y Tierra, an autonomous political division. At the center of this community, the town (or sometimes a city) comprised an urban area and usually boasted of a castle and a fortified wall.

By the 12th century, the alfoces had fiscal, judicial and military functions. Furthermore, they lent themselves to the communal use of land for silvopastoral agriculture; however, in the year 1100, monarchs began to allocate portions of land to the Church and the nobility, an act that undermined the very purpose of the alfoz.

The alfoz and its villa formed what would later be known as a municipality. The word alfoz comes from the Arabic al-hawz, meaning "rural district". It is currently preserved in several placenames in Spain (Note: Including Alfoz (Lugo), Alfoz de Bricia (Burgos), Alfoz de Lloredo (Cantabria), Alfoz de Quintanadueñas (Burgos), Alfoz de Santa Gadea (Burgos)) as well as is occasionally used as a modern-day common noun.

== Bibliography ==
- Martínez Sopena, Pascual (2005). Una historia de Valladolid: El Valladolid medieval (in Spanish). Ayuntamiento de Valladolid. ISBN 84-95389-80-0.
- García Velasco, Miguel Ángel (2008). Moraleja de las Panaderas: Refugio entre pinares (in Spanish). Diputación de Valladolid. p. 32. ISBN 978-84-7852-097-8.
