= Medina de Pomar =

- Municipality and city
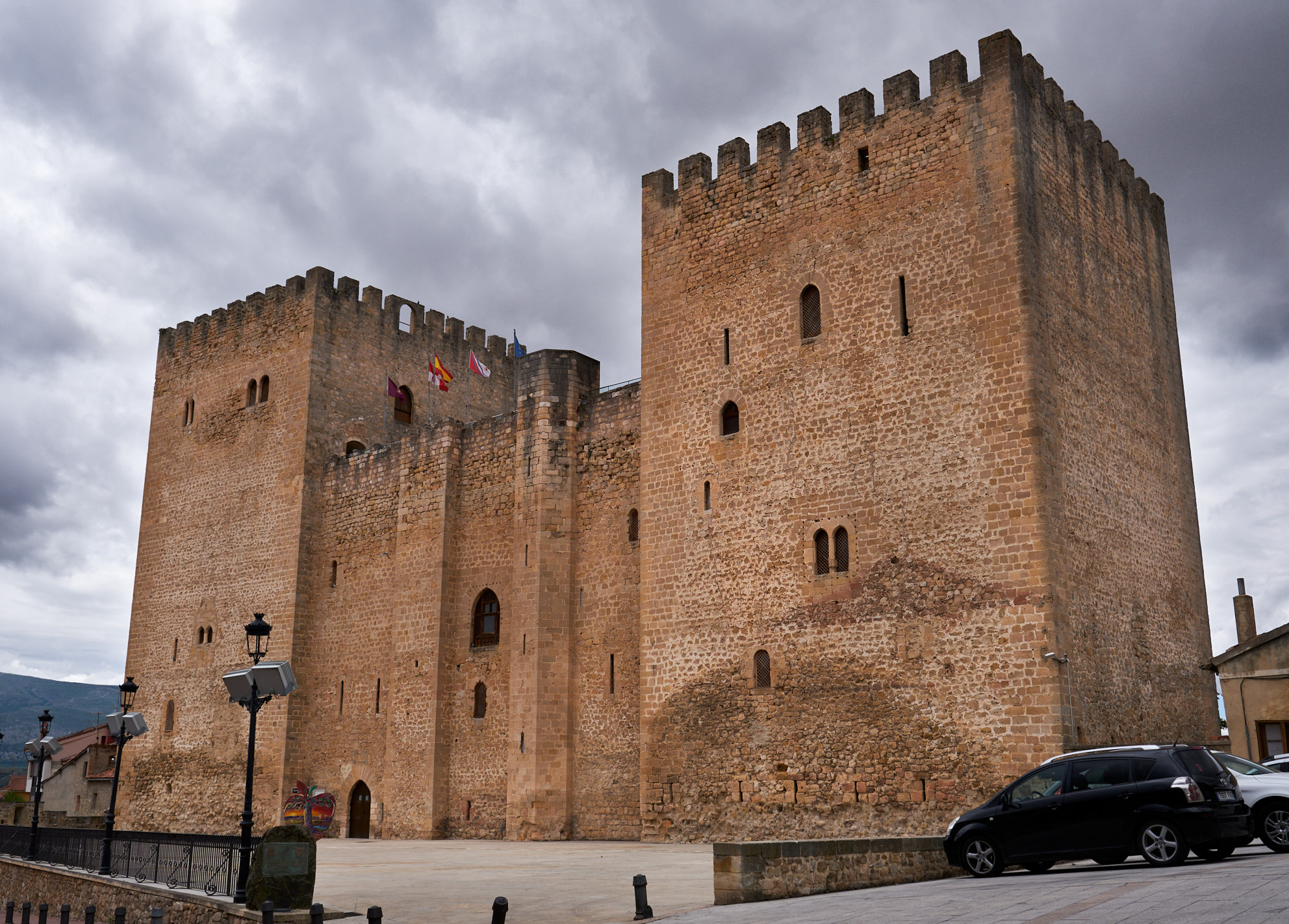
- Alcázar de los Condestables de Castilla (14th century)

- Flag Coat of arms

- Location of Medina de Pomar in Spain.
- Coordinates: 42°55′52″N 3°29′2″W
- Country: Spain
- Autonomous community: Castile and León
- Province: Burgos
- Comarca: Las Merindades

Government
  - Mayor: José Antonio López Marañón

Area
  - Total: 214 km^{2} (83 sq mi)
- Elevation: 583 m (1,913 ft)

Population (2025-01-01)
  - Total: 6,190
  - Density: 28.9/km^{2} (74.9/sq mi)
- Time zone: UTC+1 (CET)
  - Summer (DST): UTC+2 (CEST)
- Postal code: 09500
- Website: Official website

Medina de Pomar is a municipality and town located in the province of Burgos, Castile and León, Spain, 77 km from Bilbao, and 8 kilometres from Villarcayo.

Medina de Pomar is part of the Comarca of Las Merindades.

== Notable people ==
- Ramón Chíes (1846–1893) – Journalist, editor, and political activist.
- Chus Pereda (1938–2011) – Football player and manager.
