= Amarita =

Hamlet in Álava, Spain

- Concejo
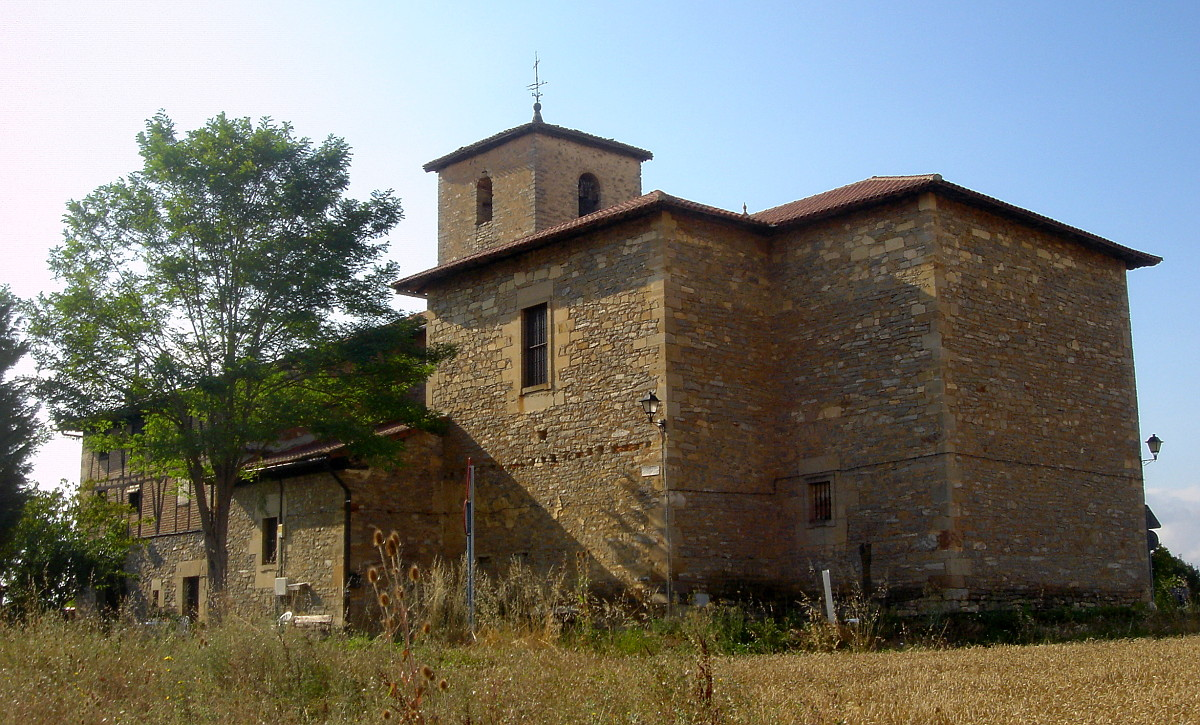
- Church of San Pedro in Amarita

- Coat of arms

- Location within Álava Location within the Basque Country Location within Spain
- Coordinates: 42°54′55″N 2°37′45″W
- Country: Spain
- Autonomous community: Basque Country
- Province: Álava
- Comarca: Vitoria-Gasteiz
- Municipality: Vitoria-Gasteiz

Area
  - Total: 2.94 km^{2} (1.14 sq mi)
- Elevation: 530 m (1,740 ft)

Population (2022)
  - Total: 56
  - Density: 19/km^{2} (49/sq mi)
- Postal code: 01195

Amarita (Basque pronunciation: [amaɾita], Spanish: Amárita [aˈmaɾita]) (Note: The Basque Government and the Foral Deputation give Amarita and Amárita as official names, respectively.) is a hamlet and concejo in the municipality of Vitoria-Gasteiz, in Álava province, Basque Country, Spain. It lies along the Santa Engracia river, which empties into the Zadorra near Amarita.

== History ==
The hamlet was first mentioned in the Reja de San Millán of 1025 with the spelling Hamarita. At the time it belonged to the alfoz of Ubarrundia, together with neighboring settlements. Together with other nearby hamlets, it was transferred to the city of Vitoria in 1332 King Alfonso XI, to which it still belongs. The Basque language was spoken in Amarita until around the seventeenth century.

== Landmarks ==
Amarita has a church dedicated to Saint Peter. The building dates from the nineteenth century and has a neoclassic altarpiece. Some elements of the church are older: the tower and the vestry dating from the eighteenth century and the lateral altarpieces are from seventeenth century. A feast in honor of Saint Peter is celebrated on June 29.
