= Cillaperlata =

Coordinates: 42.7167°N 3.35639°W

- Municipality
- Flag Coat of arms

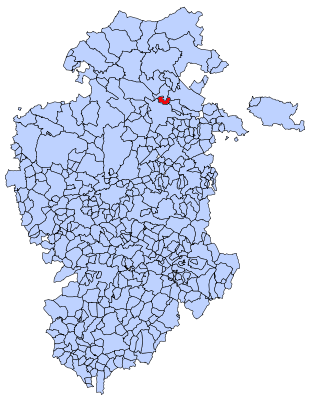
- Location of Cillaperlata municipality in Burgos province
- Country: Spain
- Autonomous community: Castile and León
- Province: Burgos
- Comarca: Las Merindades

Area
  - Total: 17 km^{2} (6.6 sq mi)

Population (2025-01-01)
  - Total: 31
  - Density: 1.8/km^{2} (4.7/sq mi)
- Time zone: UTC+1 (CET)
  - Summer (DST): UTC+2 (CEST)
- Postal code: 09213
- Website: http://www.cillaperlata.es/

Cillaperlata is a municipality located in the province of Burgos, Castile and León, Spain. According to the 2004 census (INE), the municipality had a population of 44.
