= Junta de Traslaloma =

Coordinates: 43°02′13″N 3°23′22″W

- Municipality
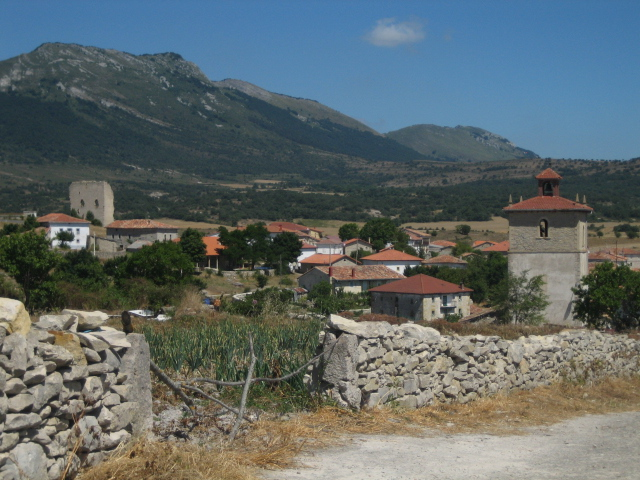
- View of Castrobarto, the Junta de Traslaloma head

- Flag Coat of arms
- Interactive map of Junta de Traslaloma
- Country: Spain
- Autonomous community: Castile and León
- Province: Burgos
- Comarca: Las Merindades
- Seat: Castrobarto

Area
  - Total: 75.81 km^{2} (29.27 sq mi)
- Elevation: 695 m (2,280 ft)

Population (2025-01-01)
  - Total: 118
  - Density: 1.56/km^{2} (4.03/sq mi)
- Time zone: UTC+1 (CET)
  - Summer (DST): UTC+2 (CEST)
- Postal code: 09514
- Website: http://www.juntadetraslaloma.es/

Junta de Traslaloma is a municipality located in the province of Burgos, Castile and León, Spain. According to the 2004 census (INE), the municipality has a population of 200 inhabitants.

The Junta de Traslaloma is made up of nine towns: Castrobarto (seat or capital), Colina, Cubillos, Las Eras, Lastras de las Eras, Tabliega, Villalacre, Villatarás and Villaventín.
