= Merindad de Sotoscueva =

- Municipality
- Flag Coat of arms
- Interactive map of Merindad de Sotoscueva
- Coordinates: 43.1167°N 3.6083°W
- Country: Spain
- Autonomous community: Castile and León
- Province: Burgos
- Comarca: Las Merindades
- Seat: Cornejo

Area
  - Total: 153 km^{2} (59 sq mi)
- Elevation: 649 m (2,129 ft)

Population (2025-01-01)
  - Total: 399
  - Density: 2.61/km^{2} (6.75/sq mi)
- Time zone: UTC+1 (CET)
  - Summer (DST): UTC+2 (CEST)
- Postal code: 09568
- Website: http://www.merindaddesotoscueva.org/ http://www.merindaddesotoscueva.es/

Merindad de Sotoscueva is a municipality located in the province of Burgos, Castile and León, Spain. According to the 2004 census (INE), the municipality has a population of 516 inhabitants. Its seat is in Cornejo.

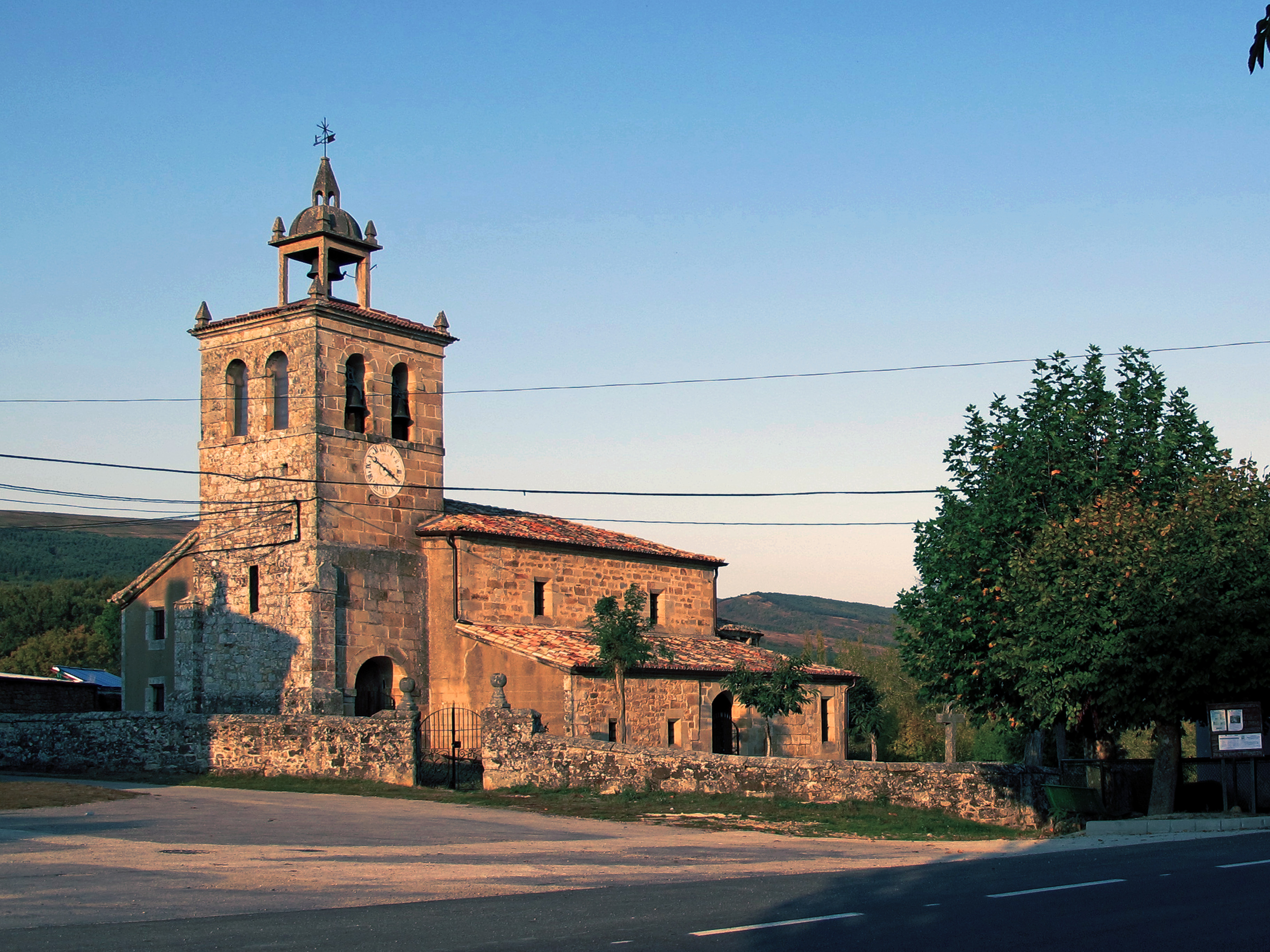
Church of Santiago Apostol in Merindad de Sotoscueva
