= Berberana =

- Municipality and town
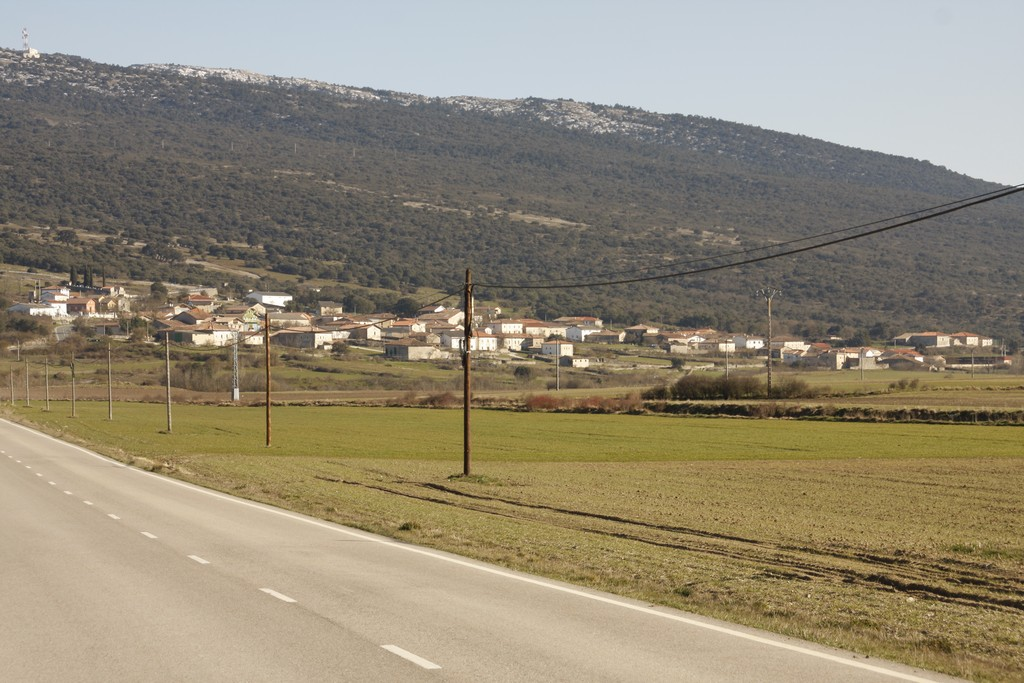
- View of Berberana, 2010

- Flag Coat of arms

- Location Berberana (Spain)
- Country: Spain
- Autonomous community: Castile and León
- Province: Burgos
- Comarca: Las Merindades

Government
  - Alcalde: Mikel Arbaizagoitia Peral (Vecinos por Berberana)

Area
  - Total: 34 km^{2} (13 sq mi)
- Elevation: 622 m (2,041 ft)

Population (2025-01-01)
  - Total: 52
  - Density: 1.5/km^{2} (4.0/sq mi)
- Time zone: UTC+1 (CET)
  - Summer (DST): UTC+2 (CEST)
- Postal code: 09511
- Website: http://www.berberana.es/

Berberana is a municipality and town located in the province of Burgos, Castile and León, Spain. According to the 2004 census (INE), the municipality has a population of 81 inhabitants.

The municipality of Berberana is made up of two towns: Berberana (seat or capital) and Valpuesta.
