= Ramón Chíes =

Spanish journalist, editor, and political activist

Ramón Chíes y Gómez de Riofranco
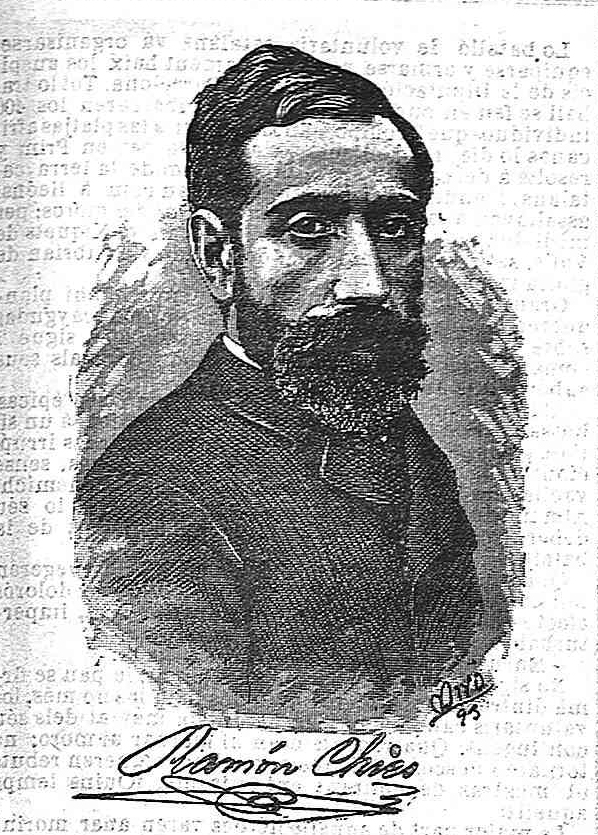
- Ramón Chíes as depicted in La Campana de Gracia
- Born: 13 October 1845; Medina de Pomar, Burgos, Spain
- Died: 1893 (aged 47–48)
- Occupations: Journalist, editor, political activist
- Known for: Freethought advocacy, anti-clericalism, and support for republicanism
- Notable work: Las dominicales del Libre Pensamiento
- Office: Member of the Madrid City Council
- Term: 1893

Ramón Chíes y Gómez de Riofranco (13 October 1845 – 1893) was a Spanish journalist, editor, and political activist. Best known for his support for anti-clerical and republican positions, Chíes was an early proponent of Spanish Freethought as well as an advocate of the right to vote and the eight-hour working day.

== Biography ==
Chíes was born in the municipality of Medina de Pomar, Burgos in 1846, and studied the sciences, philosophy, and law in Santander and Madrid before selecting journalism as his professional focus. Following the success of the Glorious Revolution in 1868, Chíes took part in the formation of the Federal Republican Party the same year.

Chíes was the editor of El voto nacional (The National Vote) and founded the weekly Las dominicales del Libre Pensamiento (The Sundays of Freethought) with Fernando Lozano in 1882. As editor of the Dominicales, Chíes was prosecuted for blasphemy and condemned to six months' imprisonment and a heavy fine, but was acquitted on appeal after a significant effort to reverse the ruling.

Shortly before his death in 1893, Chíes was elected a member of the council of the municipality of Madrid; in this capacity he proceeded to advocate that the Spanish workers be granted the eight-hour day.
