= Jurisdicción de San Zadornil =

Coordinates: 42.8414°N 3.1575°W

- Municipality
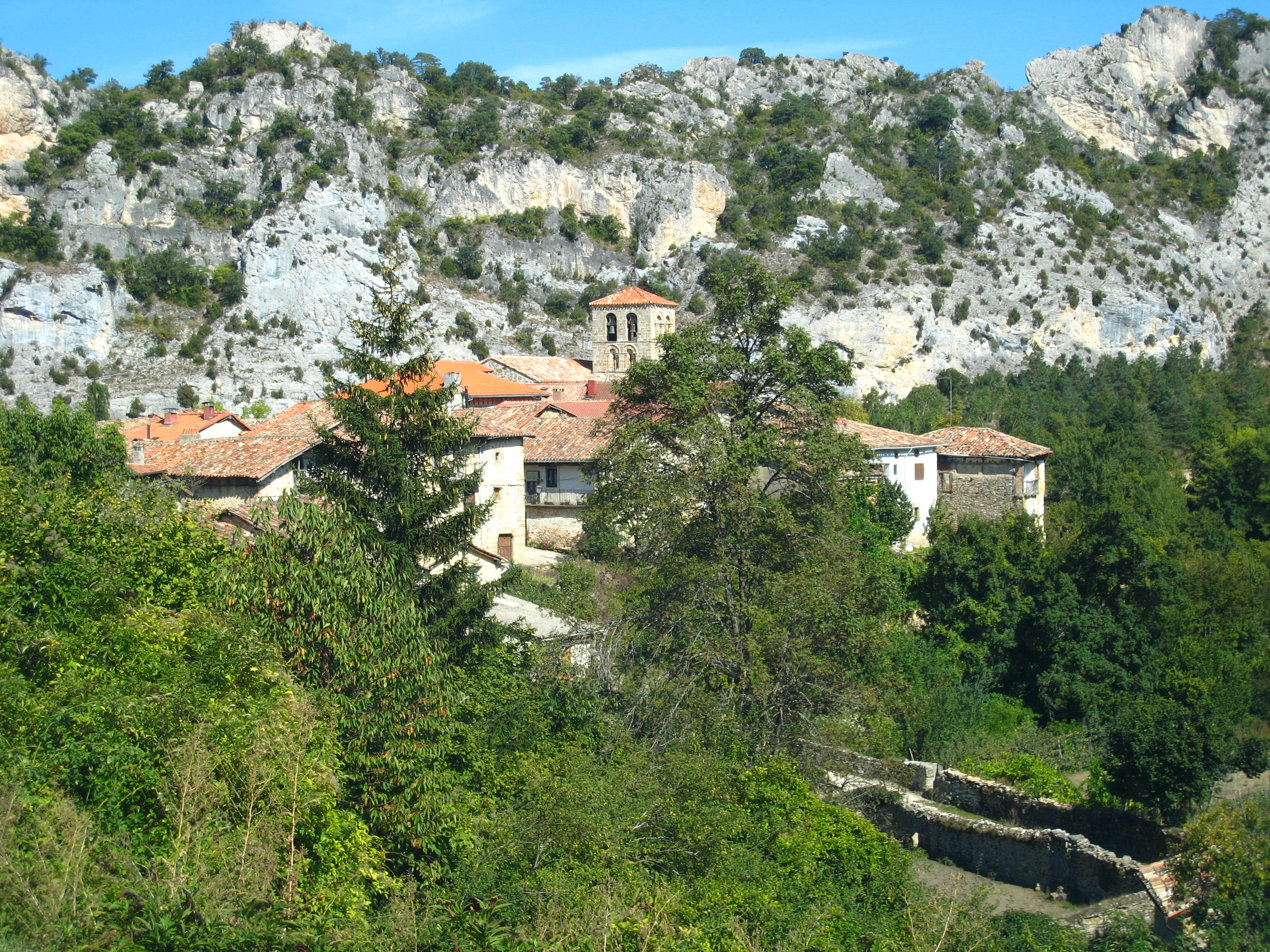
- View of San Zadornil, the Jurisdicción de San Zadornil head

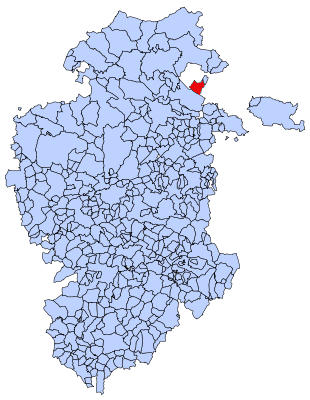
- Municipal location of the Jurisdicción de San Zadornil in Burgos province
- Country: Spain
- Autonomous community: Castile and León
- Province: Burgos
- Comarca: Las Merindades
- Seat: San Zadornil

Area
  - Total: 30 km^{2} (12 sq mi)
- Elevation: 658 m (2,159 ft)

Population (2025-01-01)
  - Total: 62
  - Density: 2.1/km^{2} (5.4/sq mi)
- Time zone: UTC+1 (CET)
  - Summer (DST): UTC+2 (CEST)
- Postal code: 01427
- Website: http://www.jurisdicciondesanzadornil.es/

Jurisdicción de San Zadornil (Spanish pronunciation: [xuɾisðiɣˈθjon de san θaðoɾˈnil]) is a municipality located in the province of Burgos, Castile and León, Spain. According to the 2004 census (INE), the municipality has a population of 110 inhabitants.

The Jurisdicción de San Zadornil is made up of four towns: San Zadornil (seat or capital), Arroyo de San Zadornil, San Millán de San Zadornil and Villafría de San Zadornil.

San Millán de San Zadornil is the site of one of the combats that led to the Anglo-Allied victory at the Battle of San Millan-Osma in the Peninsular War.
