= Merindad de Cuesta Urria =

Merindad de Cuesta-Urria
- Municipality
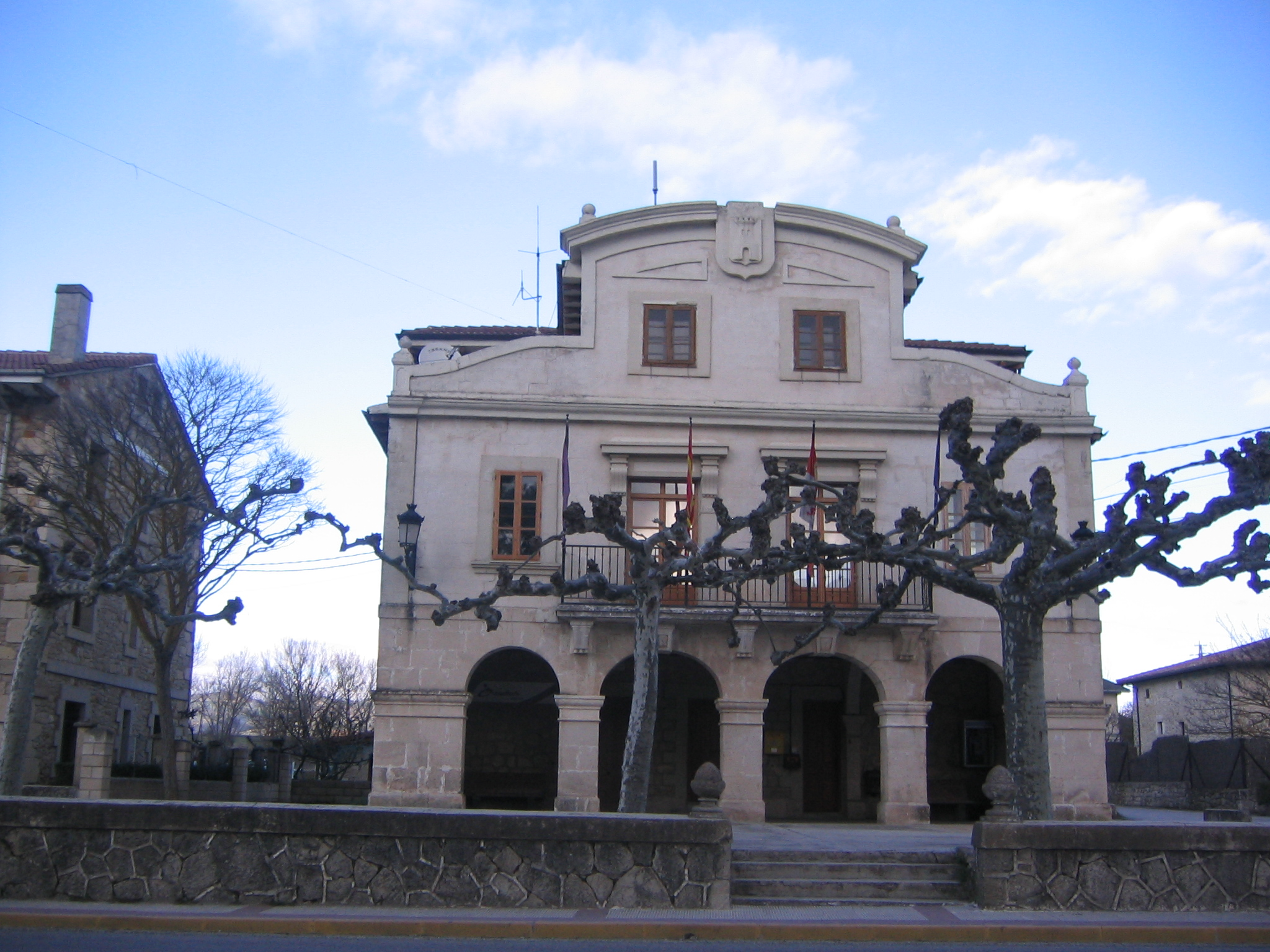
- Town hall
- Interactive map of Merindad de Cuesta-Urria
- Coordinates: 42°54′00″N 3°23′30″W
- Country: Spain
- Autonomous community: Castile and León
- Province: Burgos
- Comarca: Las Merindades
- Seat: Nofuentes

Area
  - Total: 121 km^{2} (47 sq mi)
- Elevation: 894 m (2,933 ft)

Population (2025-01-01)
  - Total: 263
  - Density: 2.17/km^{2} (5.63/sq mi)
- Time zone: UTC+1 (CET)
  - Summer (DST): UTC+2 (CEST)
- Postal code: 09515
- Website: https://merindaddecuestaurria.burgos.es/

Merindad de Cuesta-Urria is a municipality located in the province of Burgos, Castile and León, Spain. According to the 2004 census (INE), the municipality has a population of 500 inhabitants. Its seat is in Nofuentes.
