= Merindad de Valdivielso =

- Municipality
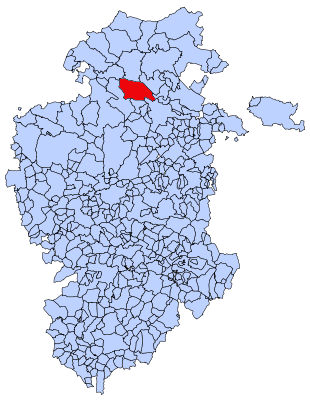
- Municipal location of the Merindad de Valdivielso in Burgos province
- Coordinates: 42.820°N 3.536°W
- Country: Spain
- Autonomous community: Castile and León
- Province: Burgos
- Comarca: Las Merindades
- Seat: Quecedo

Area
  - Total: 128 km^{2} (49 sq mi)
- Elevation: 645 m (2,116 ft)

Population (2025-01-01)
  - Total: 384
  - Density: 3.00/km^{2} (7.77/sq mi)
- Time zone: UTC+1 (CET)
  - Summer (DST): UTC+2 (CEST)
- Postal code: 09559
- Website: www.merindaddevaldivielso.com www.merindaddevaldivielso.es

Merindad de Valdivielso is a municipality located in the province of Burgos, Castile and León, Spain. According to the 2006 census (INE), the municipality has a population of 469 inhabitants.
