= Junta de Villalba de Losa =

Coordinates: 42°56′07″N 3°05′13″W

- Municipality
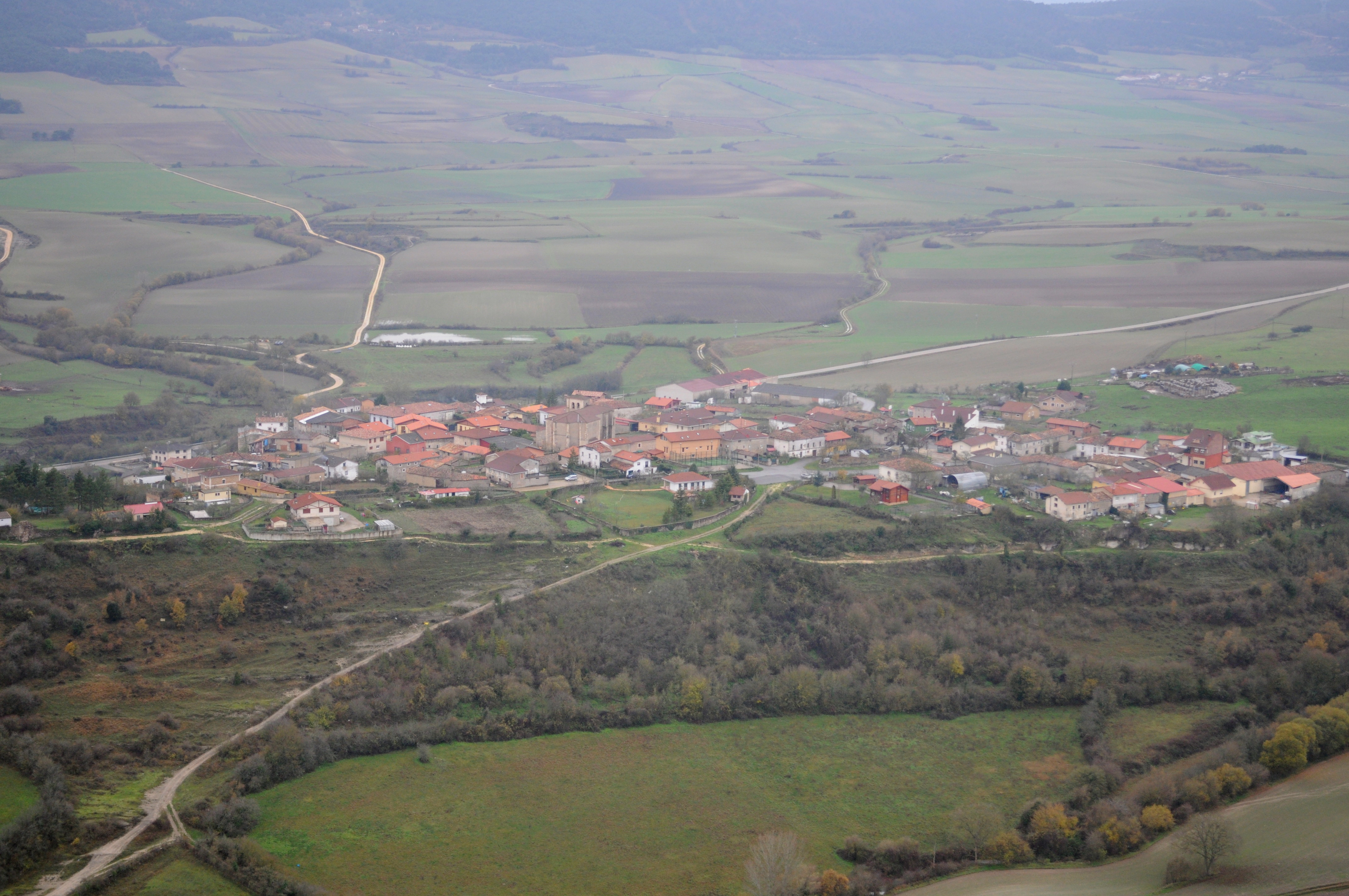
- View of Villalba de Losa (Burgos, Spain)
- Interactive map of Junta de Villalba de Losa
- Country: Spain
- Autonomous community: Castile and León
- Province: Burgos
- Comarca: Las Merindades
- Seat: Villalba de Losa

Area
  - Total: 86 km^{2} (33 sq mi)
- Elevation: 668 m (2,192 ft)

Population (2025-01-01)
  - Total: 79
  - Density: 0.92/km^{2} (2.4/sq mi)
- Time zone: UTC+1 (CET)
  - Summer (DST): UTC+2 (CEST)
- Postal code: 09511
- Website: https://www.juntadevillalbadelosa.es/

Junta de Villalba de Losa is a municipality located in the province of Burgos, Castile and León, Spain. According to the 2004 census (INE), the municipality has a population of 115 inhabitants.

The Junta de Villalba de Losa is made up of four towns: Villalba de Losa (seat or capital), Mijala, Murita and Zaballa.
