= Alfoz de Santa Gadea =

Coordinates: 42°57′20″N 3°57′02″W

- Municipality
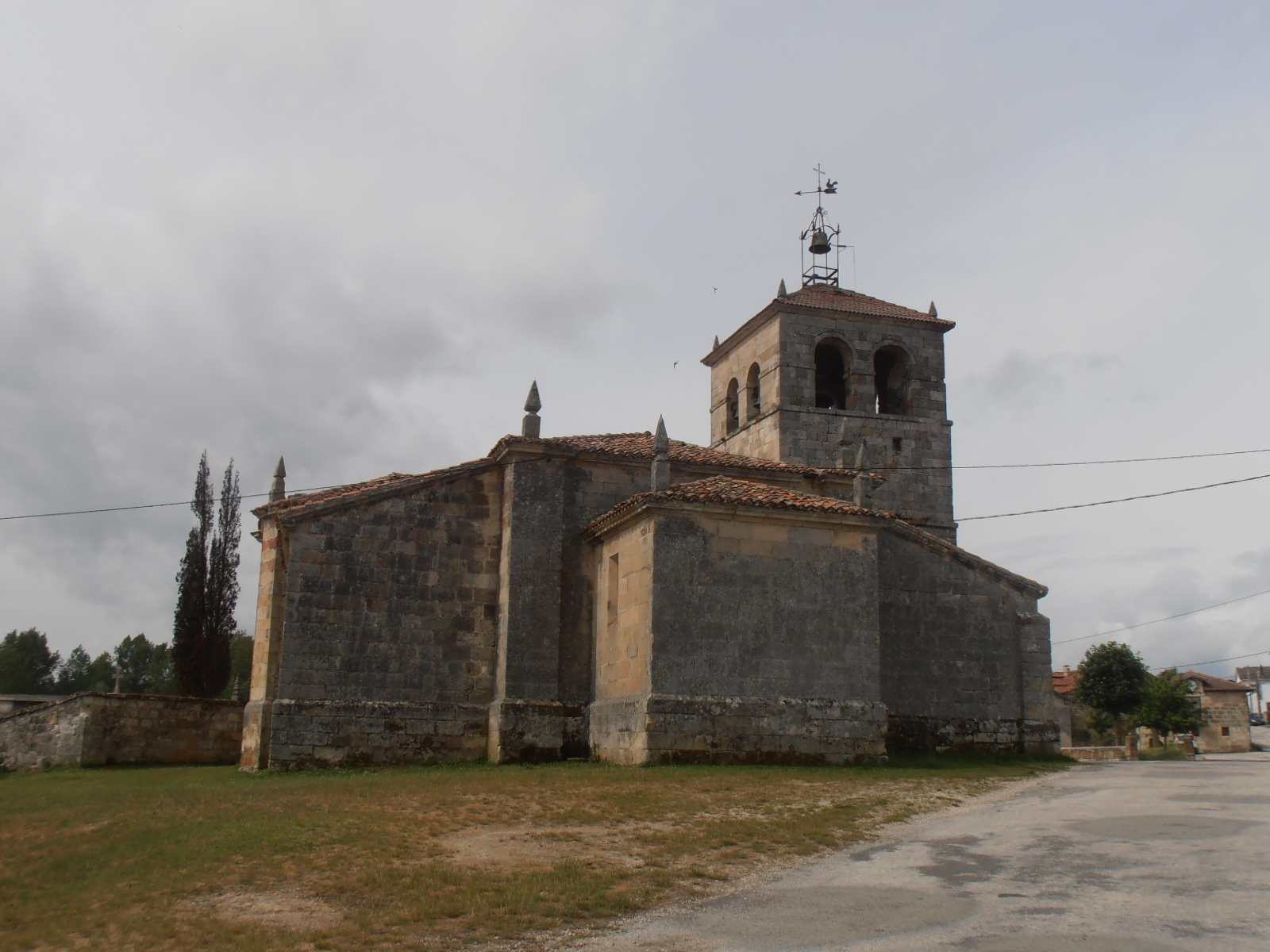
- Alfoz de Santa Gadea Church.

- Flag Coat of arms
- Interactive map of Alfoz de Santa Gadea
- Country: Spain
- Autonomous community: Castile and León
- Province: Burgos
- Comarca: Las Merindades
- Seat: Santa Gadea

Area
  - Total: 34.39 km^{2} (13.28 sq mi)
- Elevation: 893 m (2,930 ft)

Population (2025-01-01)
  - Total: 102
  - Density: 2.97/km^{2} (7.68/sq mi)
- Time zone: UTC+1 (CET)
  - Summer (DST): UTC+2 (CEST)
- Postal code: 09571
- Website: http://www.alfozdesantagadea.es/

Alfoz de Santa Gadea is a municipality located in the province of Burgos, Castile and León, Spain. According to the 2004 census (INE), the municipality has a population of 132 inhabitants.

The Alfoz de Santa Gadea is made up of three towns: Santa Gadea (seat or capital), Quintanilla de Santa Gadea and Higón.
