= Valle de Zamanzas =

Coordinates: 42°51′12″N 03°44′59″W

- municipality
- Interactive map of Valle de Zamanzas
- Country: Spain
- Autonomous community: Castile and León
- Province: Burgos

Area
  - Total: 19 km^{2} (7.3 sq mi)

Population (2025-01-01)
  - Total: 46
  - Density: 2.4/km^{2} (6.3/sq mi)
- Time zone: UTC+1 (CET)
  - Summer (DST): UTC+2 (CEST)

Valle de Zamanzas is a municipality located in the province of Burgos, Castile and León, Spain. According to the 2004 census (INE), the municipality has a population of 78 inhabitants.
