= Valle de Mena =

Municipality of Spain

- Municipality
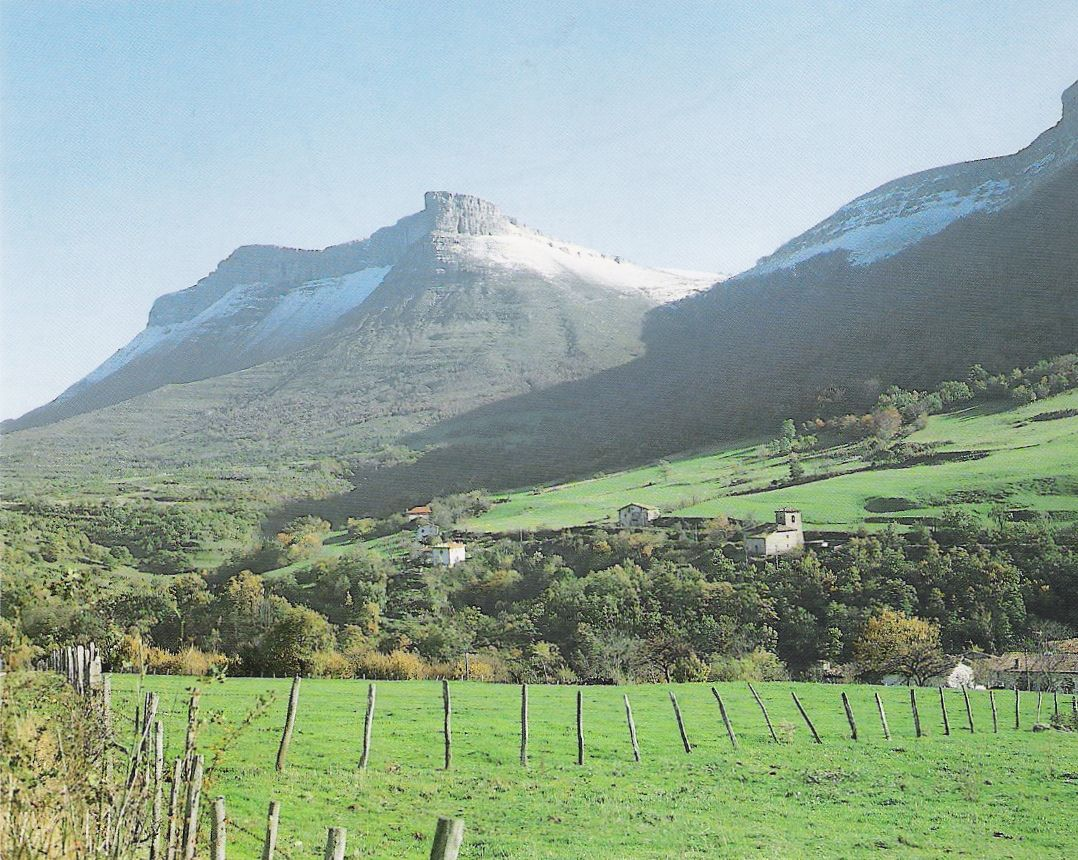
- View of Valle de Mena.

- Coat of arms

- Location of Valle de Mena. Valle de Mena (Castile and León)
- Coordinates: 43°06′N 3°17′W
- Country: Spain
- Community: Castile and León
- Province: Burgos
- Comarca: Las Merindades

Government
  - Mayor: Jose Luis Ranero López (Por Mena)

Area
  - Total: 262.29 km^{2} (101.27 sq mi)

Population (2023)
  - Total: 4,096
  - Density: 15.62/km^{2} (40.45/sq mi)
- Time zone: UTC+1 (CET)
  - Summer (DST): UTC+2 (CEST)
- Postal code: 09580
- Website: www.valledemena.es

The Mena Valley (Spanish: Valle de Mena) is a municipality in the province of Burgos in Spain. It is located in the autonomous community of Castile and León, bordering the provinces of Alava, Biscay and Cantabria.

The Mena valley has 4,096 inhabitants distributed among 43 small villages. Its capital, Villasana de Mena, has 1,554 inhabitants.

== Monuments ==
- Church of San Lorenzo de Vallejo de Mena, Burgos
- Church of Santa Maria de Siones, Burgos
