= Las Merindades =

Coordinates: 42°56′37″N 3°32′32″W

- Comarca
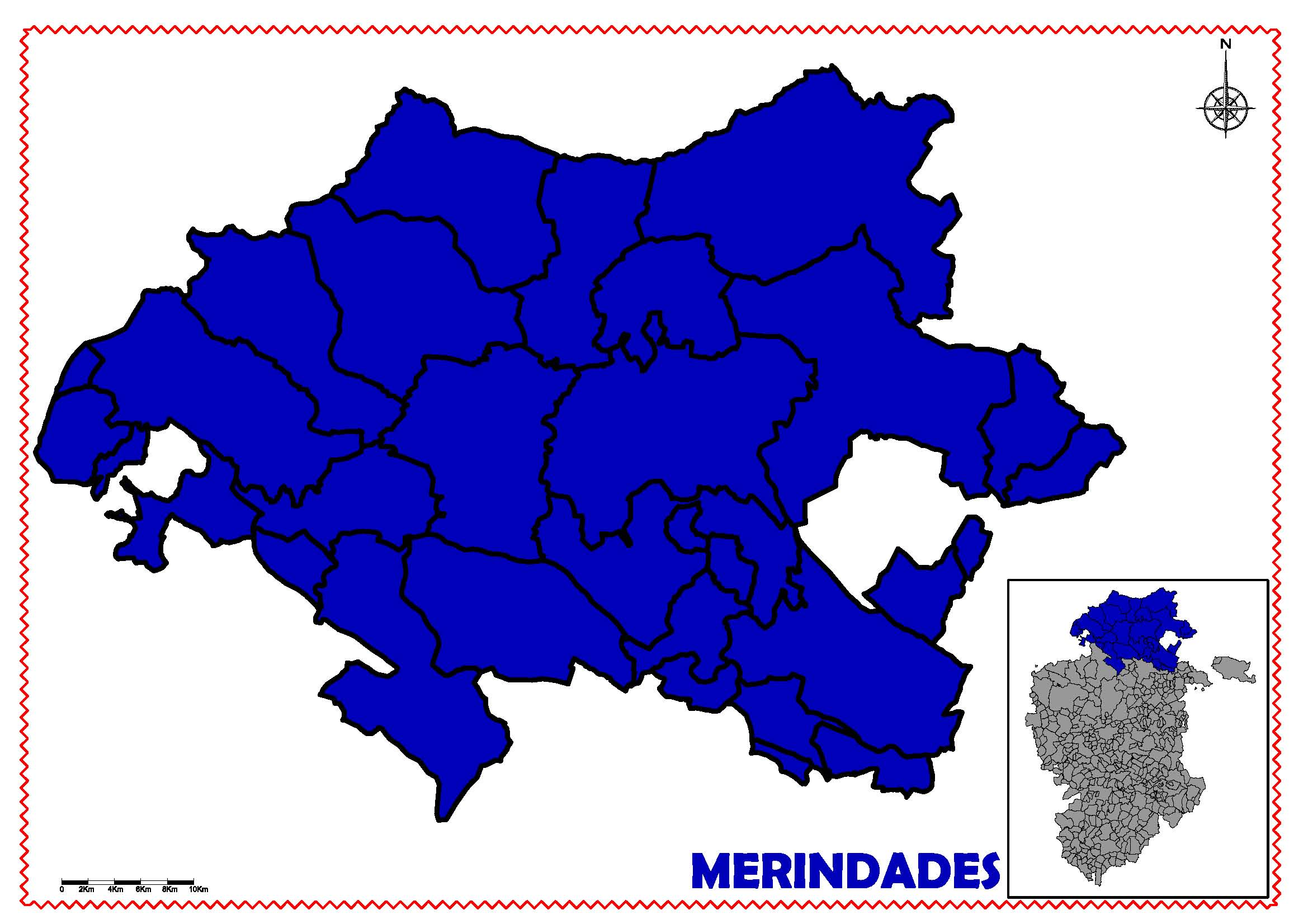
- Country: Spain
- Autonomous community: Castile and León
- Province: Burgos
- Capital: Villarcayo
- Time zone: UTC+1 (CET)
  - Summer (DST): UTC+2 (CEST)
- Largest municipality: Medina de Pomar
- Website: mancomunidadlasmerindades.es

Las Merindades is a comarca located north of the province of Burgos, in the autonomous community of Castile and León. It is bounded on the north-west by the province of Cantabria, north-east by the province of Biscay, south by La Bureba, south-east by Ebro, south-west by Páramos, and on the east by the province of Álava.

== History ==
Located in the north of the province of Burgos, the Merindades are the birthplace of the name "Castilla". Most of the villages of the Merindades were quoted in the 14th-century manuscript, the Becerro de Behetrias, at the moment of the creation of the merindad subdivision by Pedro of Castile.

== Administrative entities ==
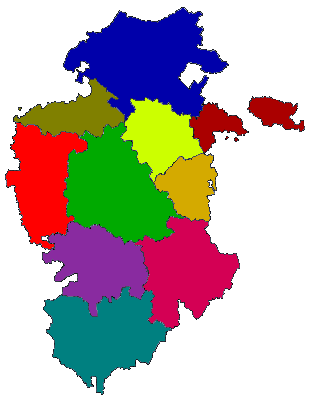
Comarcas of Burgos Páramos Alfoz de Burgos Odra y Pisuerga Arlanza Ribera del Duero Merindades Ebro La Bureba Montes de Oca Sierra de la Demanda

The capital of the comarca is Villarcayo, although the biggest town in the comarca is Medina de Pomar.

=== Municipalities (26) ===
- Alfoz de Bricia (13)
- Alfoz de Santa Gadea (3)
- Arija
- Berberana (2)
- Cillaperlata
- Espinosa de los Monteros (26)
- Frías (3)
- Junta de Traslaloma (9)
- Junta de Villalba de Losa (5)
- Jurisdicción de San Zadornil (4)
- Los Altos (11)
- Medina de Pomar (36)
- Merindad de Cuesta Urria (27)
- Merindad de Montija (21)
- Merindad de Sotoscueva (26)
- Merindad de Valdeporres (16)
- Merindad de Valdivielso (14)
- Partido de la Sierra en Tobalina (3)
- Trespaderne (7)
- Valle de Losa (29)
- Valle de Manzanedo (19)
- Valle de Mena (116)
- Valle de Tobalina (35)
- Valle de Valdebezana (26)
- Valle de Zamanzas (6)
- Villarcayo de Merindad de Castilla la Vieja (34)

== See also ==
- Province of Burgos
