= Trespaderne =

Coordinates: 42°48′N 3°23′W

- Municipality and town
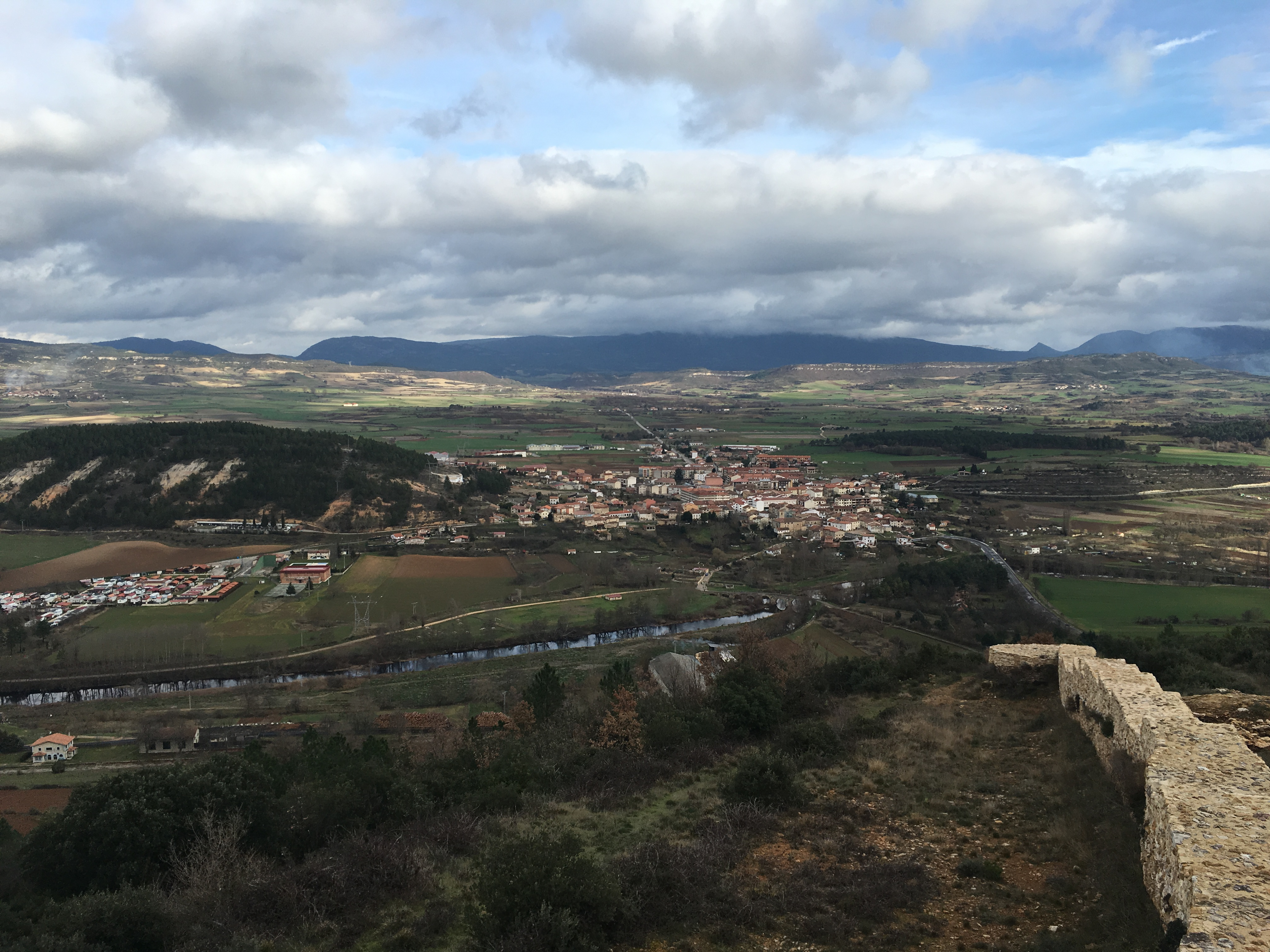

- Coat of arms

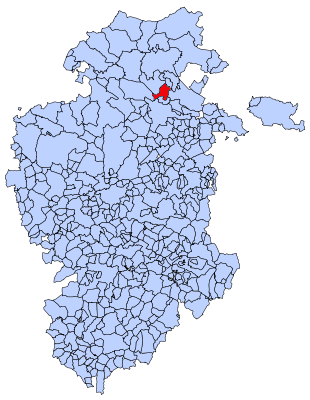
- Municipal location of Trespaderne in Burgos province
- Country: Spain
- Autonomous community: Castile and León
- Province: Burgos
- Comarca: Las Merindades

Area
  - Total: 36 km^{2} (14 sq mi)
- Elevation: 551 m (1,808 ft)

Population (2025-01-01)
  - Total: 721
  - Density: 20/km^{2} (52/sq mi)
- Time zone: UTC+1 (CET)
  - Summer (DST): UTC+2 (CEST)
- Postal code: 09540
- Website: http://www.trespaderne.com/

Trespaderne is a town and municipality located in the province of Burgos, Castile and León, Spain. According to the 2004 census (INE), the municipality has a population of 1,049 inhabitants.
