= Alfoz de Bricia =

- Municipality
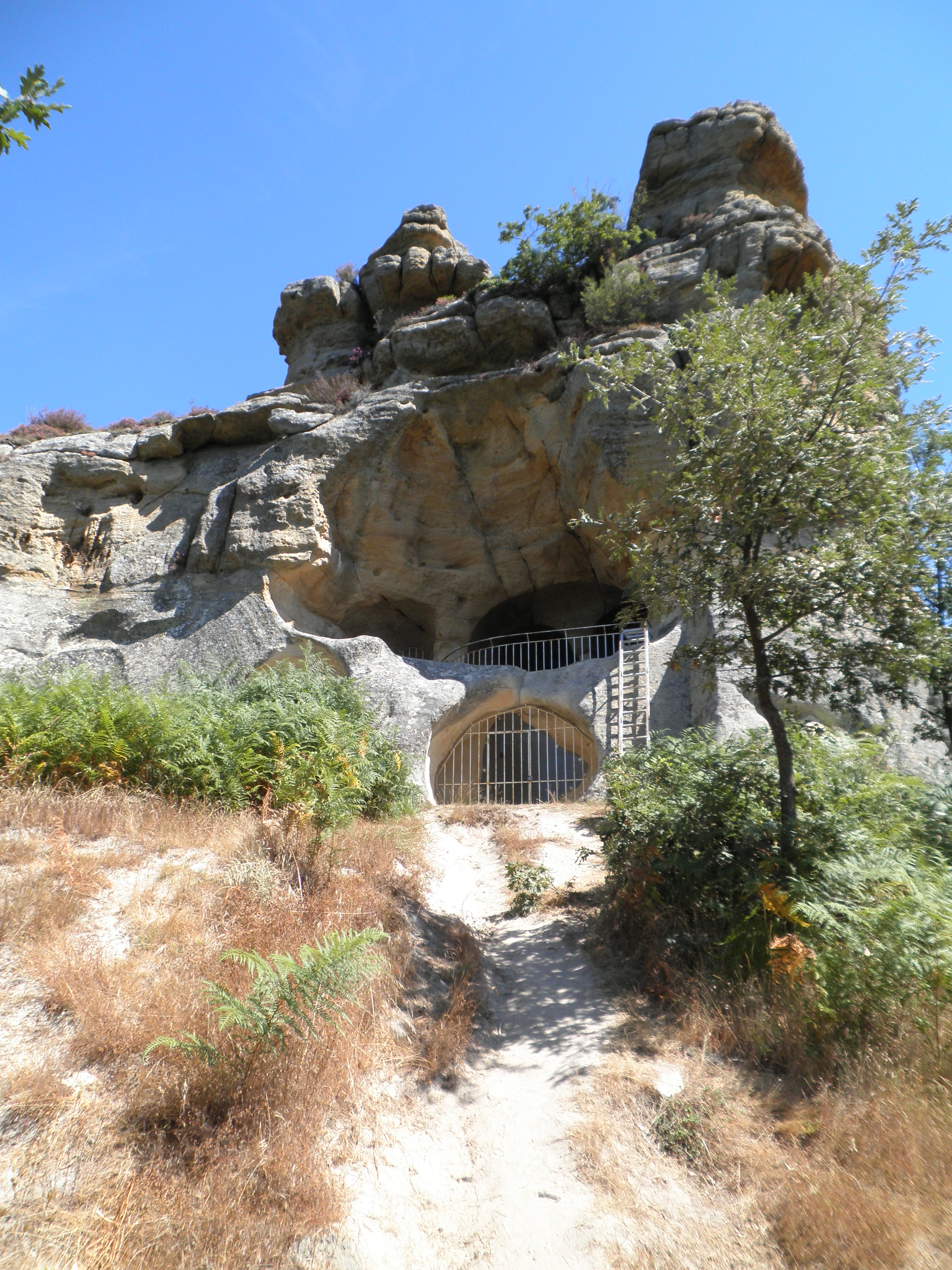
- San Miguel cave chapel in Presillas, Alfoz de Bricia (10th century)

- Location within Castile and León Location within Spain
- Coordinates: 42°53′48″N 3°52′45″W
- Country: Spain
- Autonomous community: Castile and León
- Province: Burgos
- Comarca: Las Merindades
- Seat: Barrio de Bricia

Area
  - Total: 52.14 km^{2} (20.13 sq mi)
- Elevation: 1,040 m (3,410 ft)

Population (2025-01-01)
  - Total: 68
  - Density: 1.3/km^{2} (3.4/sq mi)
- Time zone: UTC+1 (CET)
  - Summer (DST): UTC+2 (CEST)
- Postal code: 09572
- Website: http://www.alfozdebricia.es/

Alfoz de Bricia is a municipality located in the province of Burgos, Castile and León, Spain. According to the 2004 census (INE), the municipality has a population of 119 inhabitants.

The Alfoz de Bricia is composed of eleven towns: Barrio de Bricia (seat or capital), Bricia, Campino, Cilleruelo de Bricia, Linares de Bricia, Lomas de Villamediana, Montejo de Bricia, Presillas, Valderías, Villamediana de Lomas and Villanueva de Carrales.
