= Valle de Manzanedo =

Coordinates: 43°01′14″N 03°46′7″W

- municipality
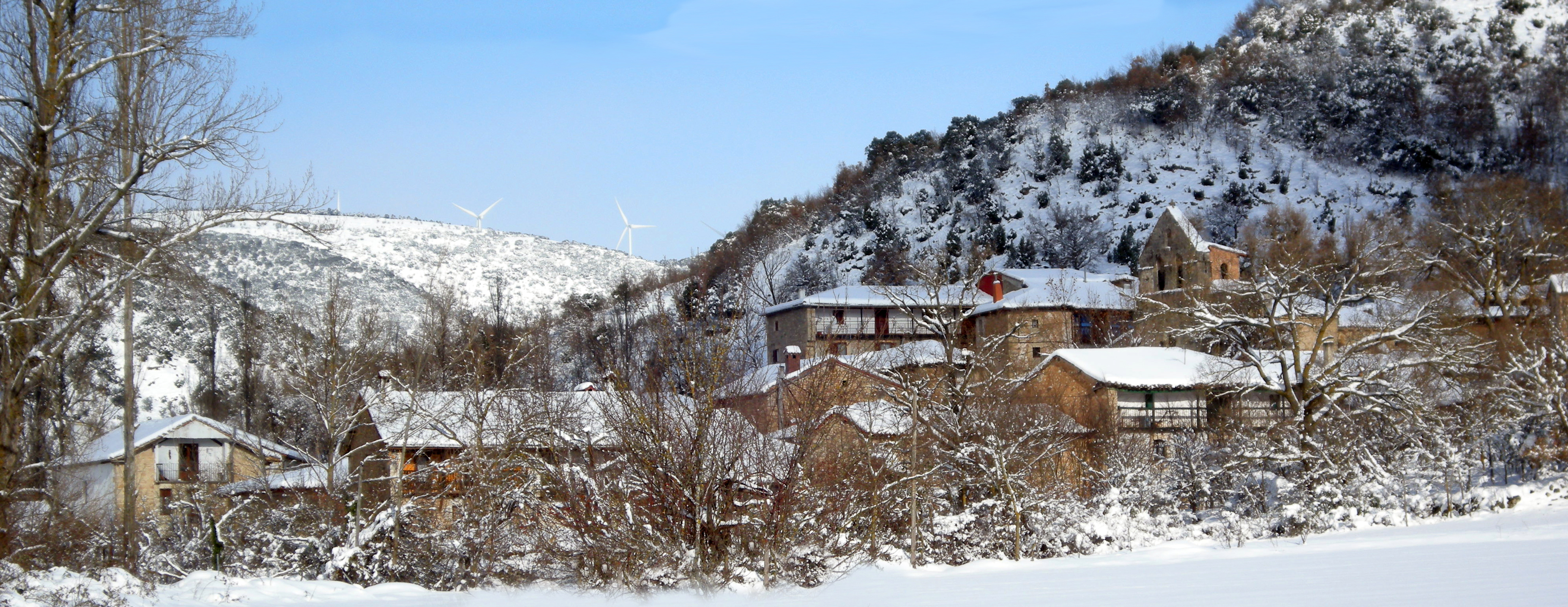
- Manzanedo in winter

- Flag Coat of arms
- Interactive map of Valle de Manzanedo
- Country: Spain
- Autonomous community: Castile and León
- Province: Burgos

Area
  - Total: 70 km^{2} (27 sq mi)

Population (2025-01-01)
  - Total: 115
  - Density: 1.6/km^{2} (4.3/sq mi)
- Time zone: UTC+1 (CET)
  - Summer (DST): UTC+2 (CEST)
- Website: http://www.valledemanzanedo.org

Valle de Manzanedo is a municipality located in the province of Burgos, Castile and León, Spain. According to the 2004 census (INE), the municipality has a population of 136 inhabitants.
