= Villarcayo de Merindad de Castilla la Vieja =

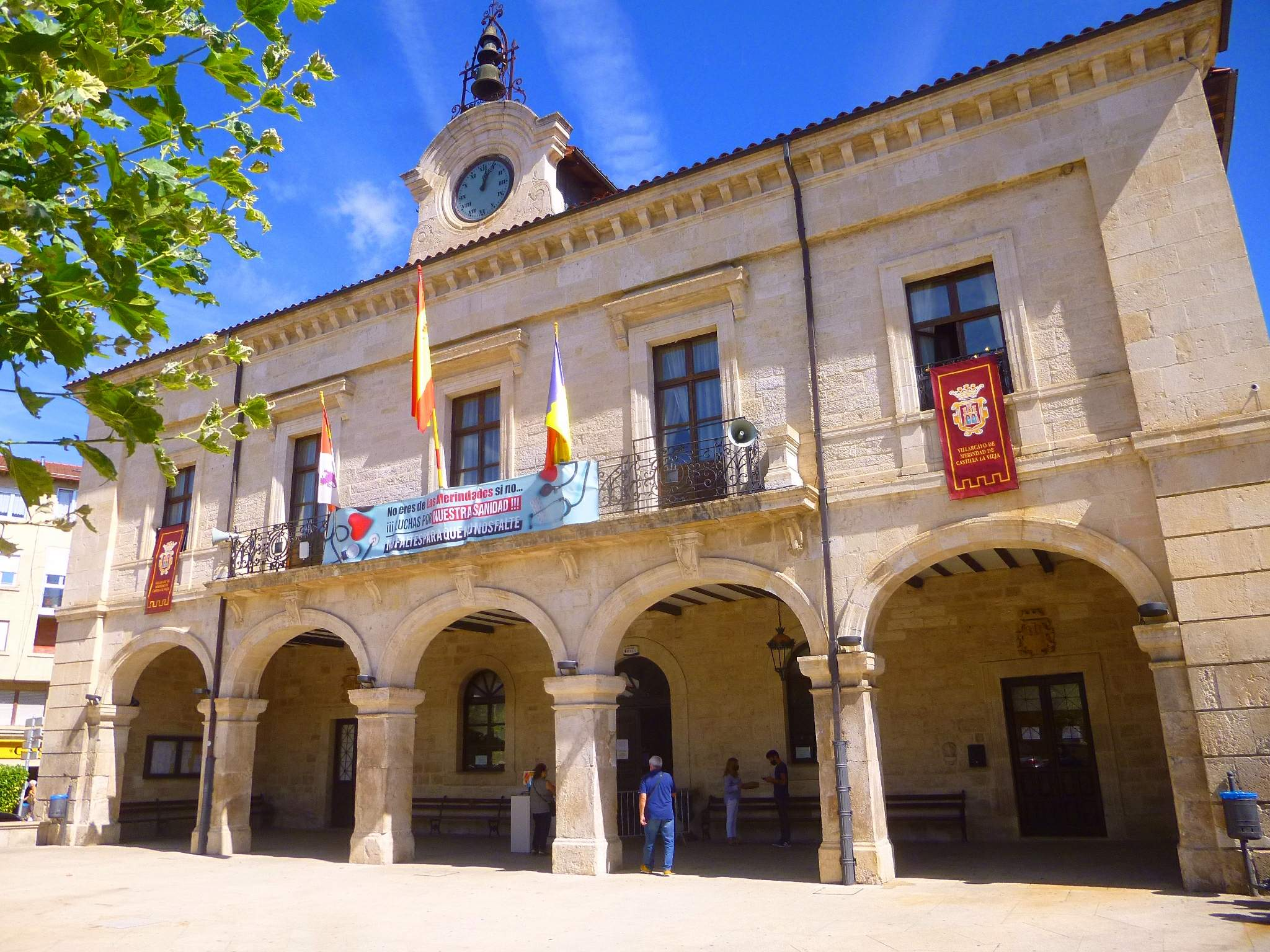
- Town hall

- Flag Coat of arms

- Location in Spain
- Coordinates: 42.9391°N 3.5719°W
- Country: Spain
- Autonomous community: Castile and León
- Province: Burgos
- Municipality: Villarcayo de Merindad de Castilla la Vieja

Area
  - Total: 150 km^{2} (58 sq mi)

Population (2025-01-01)
  - Total: 4,103
  - Density: 27/km^{2} (71/sq mi)
- Time zone: UTC+1 (CET)
  - Summer (DST): UTC+2 (CEST)

Villarcayo de Merindad de Castilla la Vieja (Spanish pronunciation: [biʎaɾˈkaʝo ðe meɾinˈdað ðe kasˈtiʎa la ˈβjexa]) is a municipality located in the province of Burgos, Castile and León, Spain. According to the 2004 census (INE), the municipality has a population of 4,031 inhabitants.
