= List of Bienes de Interés Cultural in the Province of Burgos =

This is a list of Bien de Interés Cultural landmarks in the Province of Burgos, Spain.

== List ==
- Amaya
- Atapuerca Mountains
- Clunia
- Conjunto histórico of Briviesca
- Conjunto histórico of Burgos
  - Burgos Cathedral
  - Miraflores Charterhouse
  - Abbey of Santa María la Real de Las Huelgas
- Conjunto histórico of Castrojeriz
  - Church of Nuestra Señora del Manzano
- Conjunto histórico of Espinosa de los Monteros
- Conjunto histórico of Frías
- Conjunto histórico of Gumiel de Izán
- Conjunto histórico of Medina de Pomar
- Conjunto histórico of Miranda de Ebro
- Conjunto histórico of Oña
  - Monastery of San Salvador de Oña
- Conjunto histórico of Peñaranda de Duero
  - Castle of Peñaranda de Duero
- Conjunto histórico of Poza de la Sal
- Conjunto histórico of Presencio
  - Church of San Andrés
- Conjunto histórico of La Puebla de Arganzón
- Conjunto histórico of Lerma
  - Ducal Palace of Lerma
- Conjunto histórico of Santa Gadea del Cid
- Conjunto histórico of Santo Domingo de Silos
  - Abbey of Santo Domingo de Silos
- Conjunto histórico of Treviño
- Conjunto histórico of Vadocondes
- Conjunto histórico of Villadiego
- Conjunto histórico of Villahoz
- Conjunto histórico of Villarcayo
- Monastery of San Pedro de Arlanza
- Monastery of Santa María de La Vid
- Hermitage of Santa María de Lara
