= Frias =

Frias, Frías or FRIAS may refer to:

== Places ==
- Frías, Province of Burgos, Castile and León, Spain
  - Frias Castle
- Frías de Albarracín, Aragon, Spain
- Frías District, Peru
- Frías, Santiago del Estero, Argentina
- Comandancia Frías, Argentina

== People ==
- Frías (name), and Frias, including a list of people with the name
- Duke of Frías, a Spanish hereditary title

== Other uses ==
- Fellow of the Royal Incorporation of Architects in Scotland (FRIAS)
- Freiburg Institute for Advanced Studies (FRIAS)

== See also ==
- Octávio Frias de Oliveira Bridge, in São Paulo, Brazil
- Tomás Frías Autonomous University, in Bolivia
- Tomás Frías Province, in Bolivia
