= Gabanes =

- Former settlement
- Flag Coat of arms
- Interactive map of Gabanes
- Coordinates: 36°49′09″N 118°07′50″W
- Country: Spain
- State: Castile and León
- Administrative Division: Provincia de Burgos
- Elevation: 1,140 m (3,740 ft)

Gabanes is a village located in the Valle de Tobalina, Provincia de Burgos, Castilla y León, Spain. It is one of the 28 villages that make up the Polish Valley.

== Geography ==
Gabanes is close to the nuclear power station in Garoña. It is 167 miles (269 km) north of Madrid and 39 miles (62 km) North East of Burgos.

Its two main neighborhoods are named Upper and Lower, which are separated by the Puron River that feeds the Ebro River. The main road of Gabanes is the BU-532.

== Economy ==
Farms near the village produce wheat, sunflower and opium. The primary products are bread, sunflowers and other foods.

== Ecology ==
Wild animals in the area include deer, boars, foxes, rabbits, snakes, eagles, and vultures spread across over 1,000 hunting grounds.

== Demography ==
In 1950, the population of Gabanes was 126, declining to 20 by 2004, and to 13 by 2007. In August tourists swell the number of inhabitants.

== History ==
Gabanes was incorporated in the 13th century along with 35 other villages within the municipality of Frías. In 1834, the Tobalina Valley was divided into Valle de Tobalina and Partido de la Sierra en Tobalina. Gabanes became part of the former.

== Sights ==
The bridge that crosses the Puron River is over 300 years old and remains intact.

The church, located in the center of the village, is of Romanesque style. Its bells were restored in 2005. The word "Gabanes" is derived from the word 'cabins', according to documents from the 14th century. Gabanes had a two-bed medical facility founded in the 17th century. It was located near the town oven and a school, both of which were destroyed 25 years ago to improve access to the village.

The water mill used to grind wheat, was restored in 2001 and now it is a small museum.

Near the village a necropolis that hosts Paleolithic tombs and caves.

Humion mountain rises to an altitude of 1435 meters.

== Festivals and customs ==
On August 15, annual festivities commemorate the Assumption of Mary with the tradition of "passing-streets." It involves going house-to-house tasting the best dishes of each family, accompanied by musicians playing traditional melodies of Burgos.

== See also ==
- Province of Burgos
