= San Salvador de Nogal de las Huertas =

Romanesque monastery in ruins

Coordinates: 42.3925°N 4.6453°W

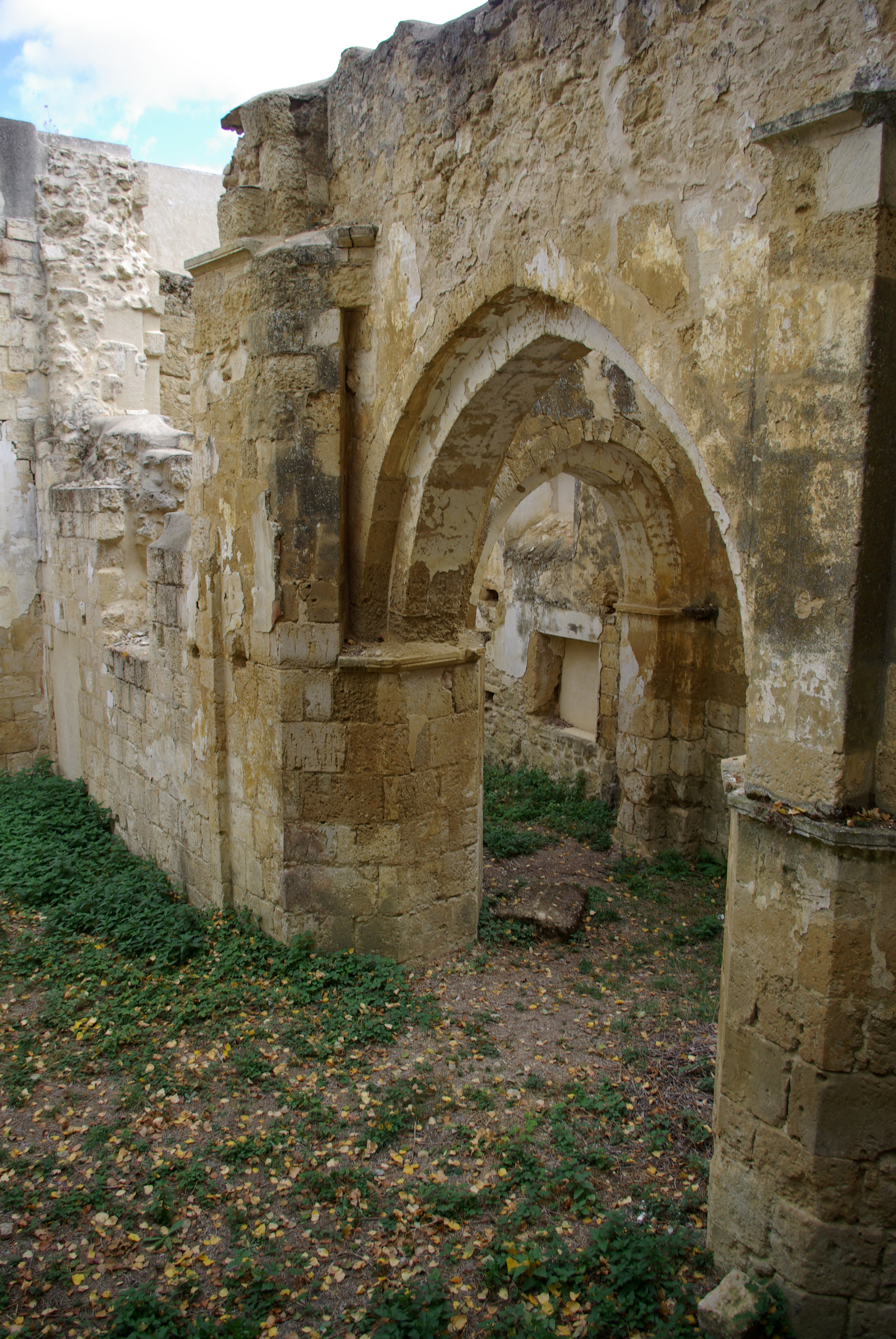
Ruins of San Salvador as of 2012

San Salvador de Nogal de las Huertas is a Cluniac monastery in Nogal de las Huertas, Spain. The architecture is significant as the oldest surviving example of the Palentine style, the romanesque idiom of the province of Palencia.

It was founded in 1063 by the Countess Elvira Sánchez, and originally constructed with a central nave and a square apse. In the mid-twelfth century, Rodrigo, youngest son of Count Pedro González de Lara and his wife Eva, became its prior, an unprecedented move for a male member of an aristocratic family in Castile. In the thirteenth century two lateral naves (aisles) with the pointed arches typical of the Gothic style were added.

The monastery passed into private hands in the 19th century. In June 1931 its ruins were declared a monumento histórico–artístico, nowadays called a conjunto histórico.

== Bibliography ==
- Herrero Marcos, Jesús. Arquitectura y simbolismo del románico palentino. Ediciones Ars Magna, 1999. ISBN 84-923230-0-0
