= Nogal de las Huertas =

Coordinates: 42°24′N 4°38′W

- municipality
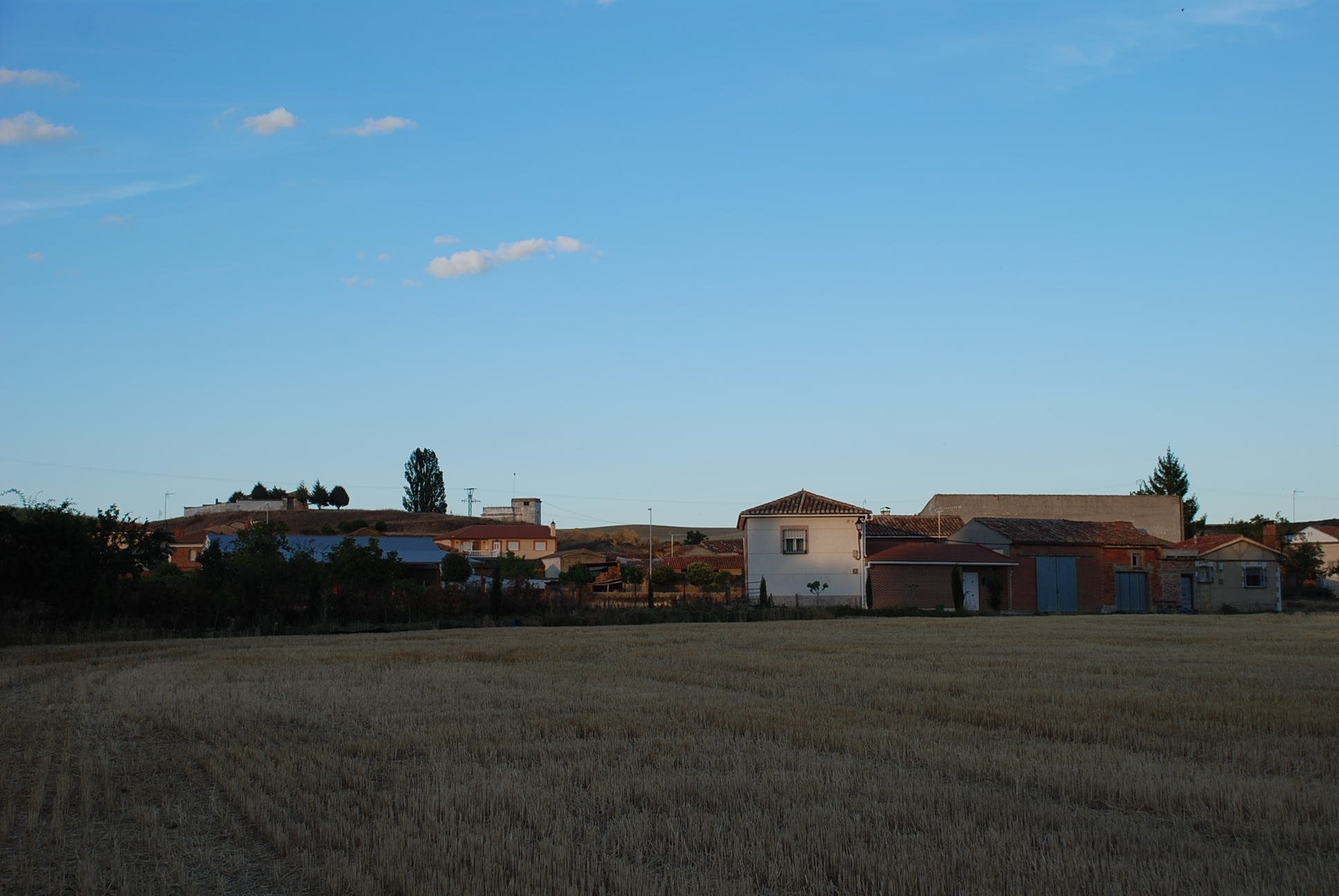
- Interactive map of Nogal de las Huertas
- Country: Spain
- Autonomous community: Castile and León
- Province: Palencia
- Municipality: Nogal de las Huertas

Area
  - Total: 13 km^{2} (5.0 sq mi)

Population (2025-01-01)
  - Total: 46
  - Density: 3.5/km^{2} (9.2/sq mi)
- Time zone: UTC+1 (CET)
  - Summer (DST): UTC+2 (CEST)
- Website: Official website

Nogal de las Huertas is a municipality located in the province of Palencia, Castile and León, Spain. According to the 2004 census (INE), the municipality has a population of 62 inhabitants.

It is the site of the monastery of San Salvador, founded in 1063.
