= Church of Nuestra Señora del Manzano, Castrojeriz =

Church in Castile and León, Spain

Iglesia de Nuestra Señora del Manzano
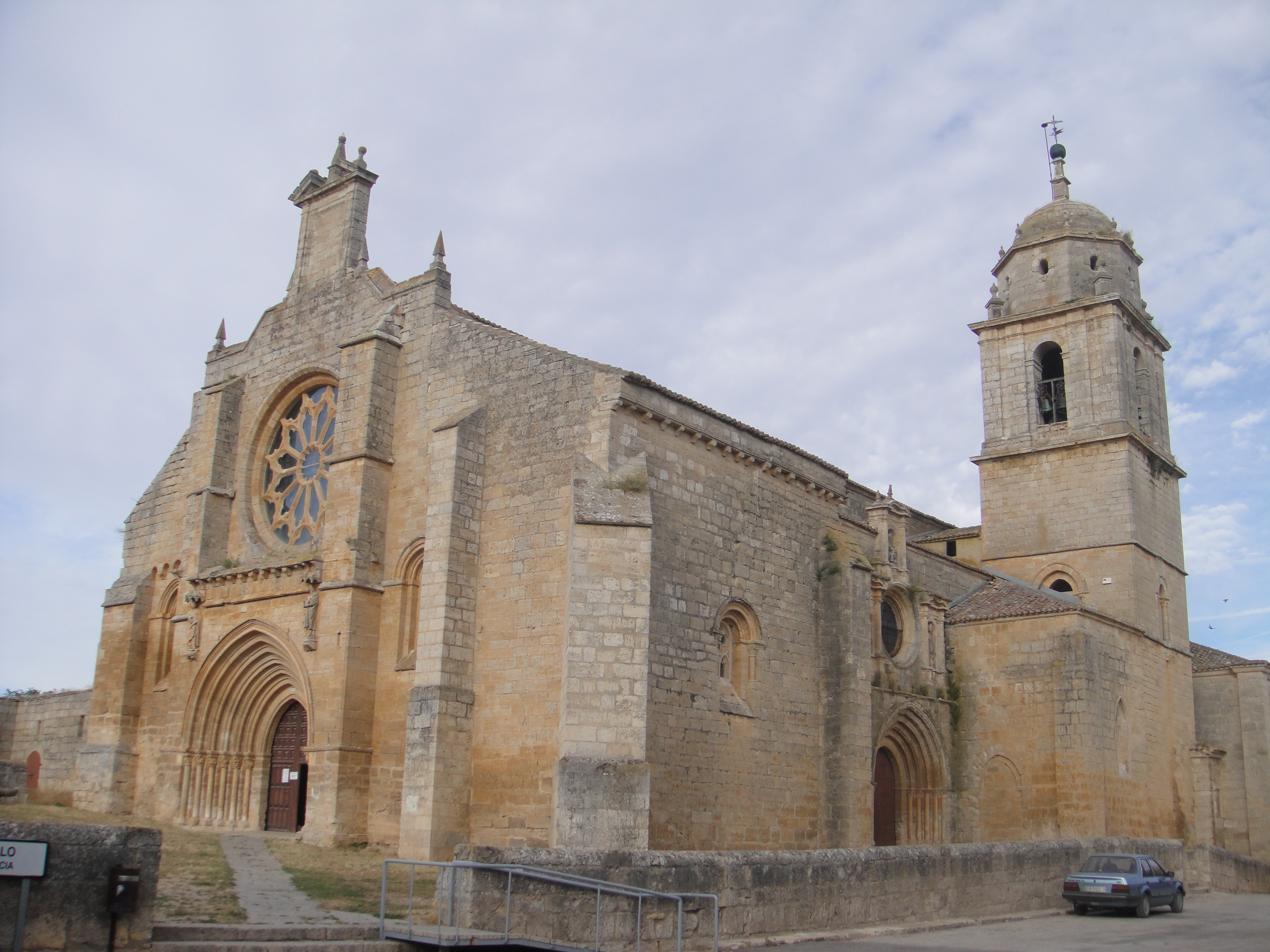

Religion
- Affiliation: Roman Catholic
- Diocese: Castrojeriz
- Province: Province of Burgos
- Ecclesiastical or organisational status: Temple

Location
- Location: Spain
- Interactive map of Iglesia de Nuestra Señora del Manzano
- Coordinates: 42°17′34″N 4°7′40″W

Architecture
- Type: Church
- Style: Gothic, Renaissance, Romanesque
- Completed: 1214

The Church of Nuestra Señora del Manzano ("Our Lady of Manzano") or Iglesia de Santa María del Manzano is a Catholic church in the town of Castrojeriz, in the province of Burgos. Construction of the current building was begun in 1214, through the will of Queen Berengaria of Castile, daughter of Alfonso VIII of Castile and mother of Ferdinand III of Castile. It is located at the foot of the hill on which the Castle of Castrojeriz stands. It previously held the rank of collegiate church.

== History ==
The origins of the church are unknown, but in the tenth century Count García Fernández granted a privilege to the canons of the collegiate church, in which he authorized the canons to build houses with tower and fortresses in the town of Castrojeriz, for which the Count granted his privileges in 974.

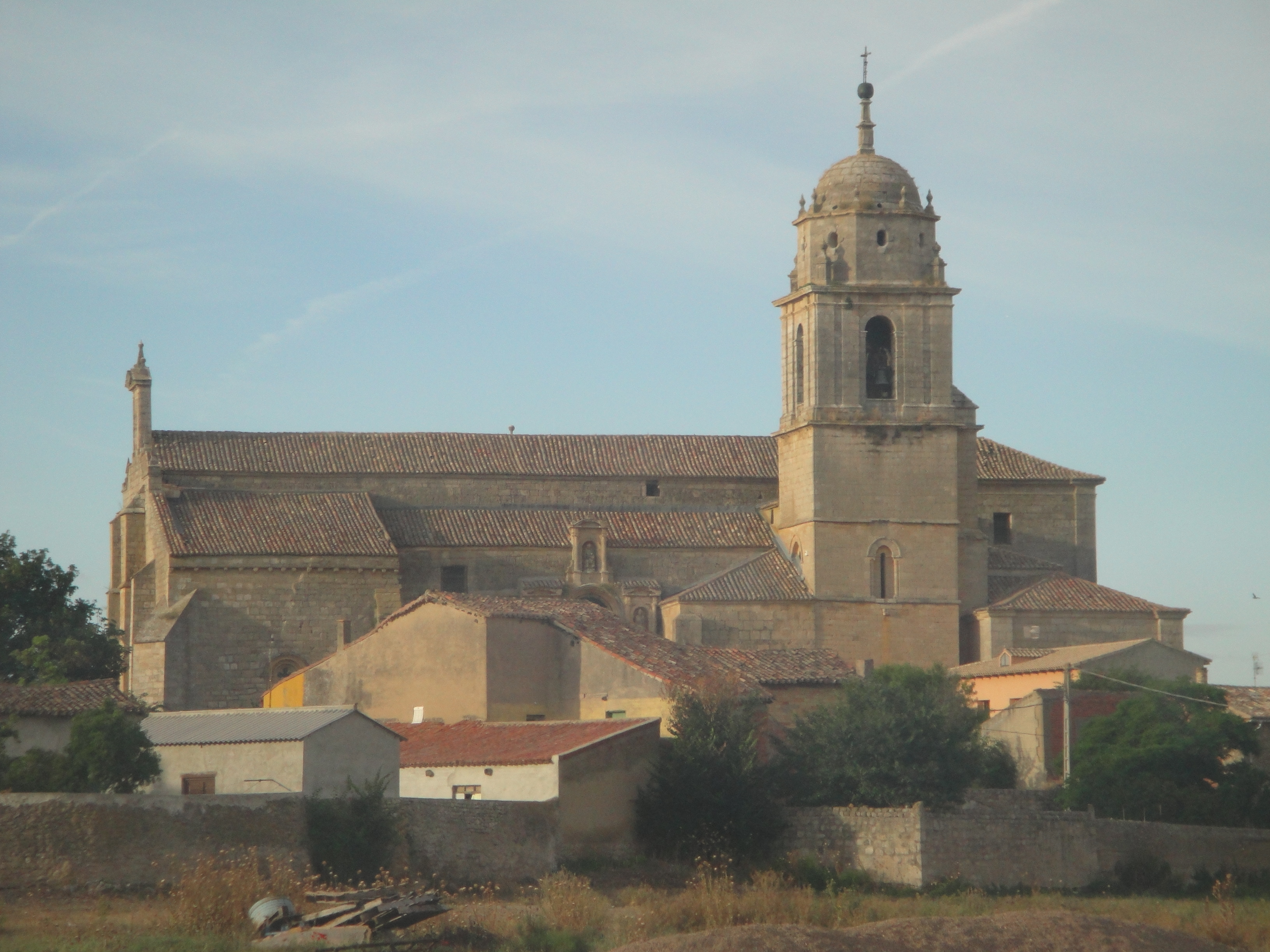
View of the exterior of the Iglesia de Nuestra Señora del Manzano in Castrojeriz.

In the same privilege, the Count provided the canons with the male villeins of the town and determined that the Castrojeriz canons and clerics could have "five hundred sueldos similar to the Fijos dalgo of Castile". Thus, if someone slandered them or caused violence in their dwellings they should pay a fine of five hundred salaries. Also if anyone killed or smote any Castrojeriz canon or religious adherent a sum of five hundred salaries would be given to relatives of the victim. This privilege was confirmed, as Enrique Flórez indicates in his España Sagrada, by King Fernando IV in 1299, during the period of his minority years as king.

In 1050 it was linked to the monastery of San Millán de la Cogolla, located in La Rioja, by King García Sánchez III of Navarre, and was renamed the Santa Maria de Castro abbey. However, when the King of Navarre lost his Castilian possessions the collegiate remained as an exempt abbey for several decades until the reign of Alfonso VII the Emperor when it was linked to the Cathedral of Burgos by that monarch, who gave the abbot of Castrojeriz the rank of dignity in the cathedral and allowed him to occupy the tenth seat in the Choir of the Burgos cathedral. In 1173, during the reign of Alfonso VIII of Castile, the collegiate church was secularized and abandoned the rule of St. Benedict.

In the late fifteenth and early sixteenth century the Manzano collegiate underwent some reforms, such as the transformation of some of its vaults and the enforcement of the rosette in the main entrance. In the eighteenth century the body and sanctuary of the church, the tower and temple covers were renovated. Also built were the Virgen del Manzano chapel, the sacristy of the chaplains, the sacristy of the canons, the Condal crypt, a new apse and choir loft. Biscayan architect Juan de Sagarvinaga was involved in these works.

In the eighteenth century, as indicated by Father Flórez in España Sagrada, masses were officiated in the temple in memory of Alfonso VII the Emperor, Sancho IV of Castile and his wife Queen María de Molina, and Ferdinand IV of Castile and his wife, queen Constance of Portugal. The same author relates that, in the eighteenth century, the chapter of the collegiate church of Nuestra Señora del Manzano consisted of the abbot, twelve canons, three dignities and eight prebendaries.

== Description ==
=== Exterior ===
The main portal of the church is Gothic, it is located at the foot of the temple and is in the style of a flared bow with Archivolts and baquetones with bases and capitals in plant motifs. On either side are located two stone sculptures from the thirteenth century, and representing the Virgin Mary and the Archangel Gabriel, covered with canopies and supported by brackets. In the rose window of the main portal, which was recently restored, God is depicted in an attitude of blessing, and surrounded by the apostles. On the edge of the rose window are the symbols of the four evangelists along with the heads of angels and the coat of arms of the donor.

The portal on the church's south façade is in Renaissance style. The base of the tower of the church is Romanesque, but in the eighteenth century it was renovated when, in 1746 the tower was added to the belfry.

The primitive apse of the church disappeared after the reforms carried out on the temple in the eighteenth century, when it was replaced by the current rectangular head.

=== Interior ===
Although the building was completed in Gothic style, the presence of the Romanesque style is visible in some areas. The church, built completely of ashlar stone, has three naves, with five sections, along with the central nave, which measures about seventeen meters taller than the other two. The widths of the nave and side are in proportion of two to one. The aisles, that end in flat chevet, have late Romanesque ribbed arches and Gothic stone arches.

The oldest surviving altarpieces inside the temple are the Cristo crucificado, the work of the late sixteenth century, and that of St. James the Apostle, executed in the seventeenth century. The rest of the altarpiece of the church dates back to the eighteenth century.

The main altarpiece was implemented in 1760, thanks to the patronage of the Counts of Ribadavia. It contains a series of paintings, representing the Annunciation, the Visitation, the Birth of Christ, the Presentation of Jesus in the Temple, Baby Jesus among the doctors and in the top of the altarpiece, Saint John the Baptist. The Annunciation was painted by Anton Raphael Mengs, while the rest of the paintings that comprise the altarpiece have been attributed to a number of his disciples, among whom Mariano Salvador Maella and Francisco Bayeu are mentioned.

Among the furniture in the temple built in the eighteenth century are the choir stalls, which was completed around 1776, the lectern, located within the choir, and the church organ, in a Neoclassical style, which was made around 1790.

The choir is located in the main nave of the church, and is closed by a Renaissance gate. There is a painting of the Virgin de las Cerezas in the choir, a work attributed to the Flemish painter Pieter Pourbus.

The image of Nuestra Señora del Manzano, made using polychrome stone is located in the chapel that bears its name, built in the eighteenth century. The Virgin Mary is depicted standing and wearing a blue tunic, dotted with stars, and covered with a cloak gathered at her waist. The Virgin holds the Christ Child in her left arm, while with her right hand she strokes the foot of the Child, which is dressed in a red robe. The Virgin is crowned, and on her chest she bears a cameo on which the letter "T" is engraved.

=== Nuestra Señora del Manzano capital ===
It was built in the eighteenth century by the architect Juan de Sagarvinaga, disciple and follower of Ventura Rodriguez. The three altars placed in the chapel were made by Francisco Diez de Mata, although the two side altars of the chapel, which pays homage to images of the defunct Monastery of San Anton Castrojeriz. These altar were not gilded.

The central altarpiece in the chapel, in Baroque style, and in which the image of Nuestra Señora del Manzano is housed, was gilded by painter Barranco Martinez Burgos, who was a pupil of Mengs.

A number of Canticles have been dedicated to the image of the Virgen del Manzano: number 242, about El cantero de Castrojeriz, which tells how a master ashlar stone layer was saved by the Virgin on losing his balance and hanging by only a nail. Canticle 249, Maestre que trabajaba en la Iglesia (about the maestre who worked on the Church). Canticle 252, Salvados de la arena en Castrojeriz. And canticle 266 La viga de madera de Castrojeriz, which chronicles the fall of a beam during mass without anyone getting hurt.

=== Queen Eleanor of Castile sepulchre ===
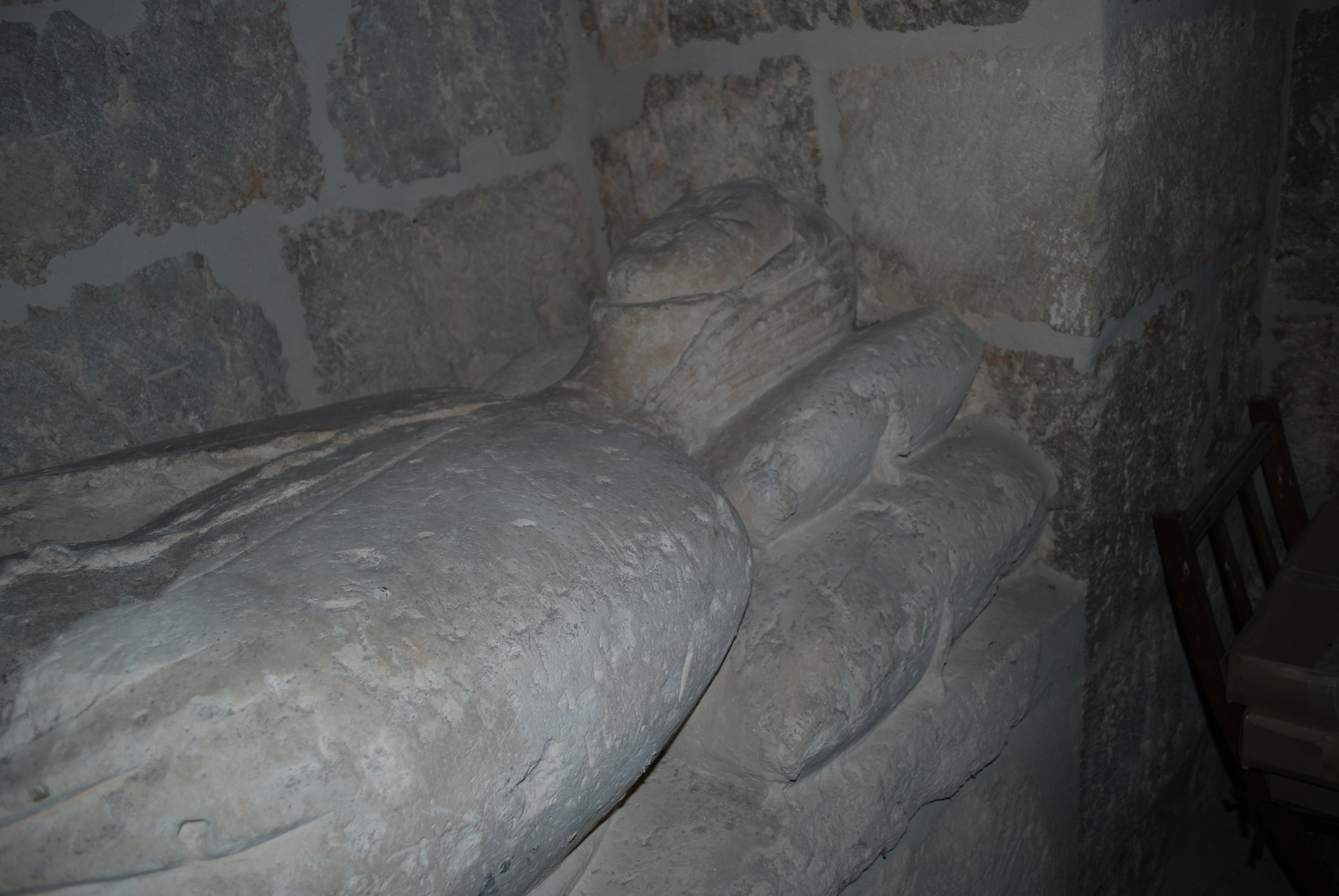
Grave of the Queen Eleanor of Castile (1307–1359) in the Iglesia de Nuestra Señora del Manzano

In addition to the church's baptistery, there remains a Gothic style tomb which is supposed to contain the mortal remains of Queen Eleanor of Castile, daughter of Ferdinand IV and sister of Alfonso XI, who was murdered in 1359 in Castrojeriz by order of her nephew, Peter I of Castile. The tomb attributed to Queen Eleanor of Castile is located at the foot of the Collegiate, near the baptistery, and was discovered in June 1970 by the Missionary Rescue Group from the Agrupación Escolar Marqués in Camarasa. It had been hidden behind an adobe wall.

From the moment of its discovery the tomb was attributed by experts to Queen Eleanor of Castile, daughter of Ferdinand IV, as the bill for the Sepulchre corresponds to other mid-fourteenth century tombs, and by the fact that on its cover there is the graven image of a prostrate woman. It was also recorded that the queen had been buried in that sepulchre, and that it had been located up to the eighteenth century on the Evangelical side of the High Altar and had been moved to its current location to make way for the crypt for the burial of the Counts of Castro, a work which was carried out in the eighteenth century.

The assumption that the remains of Queen Eleanor were buried in this Sepulchre appears to be supported by the fact that certain documents found refer to the queen being buried in the Castrojeriz collegiate, after her assassination in 1359, and her remains were deposited in a tomb in the temple.

However, there are two other places that claim possession of the remains of Queen Eleanor of Castile, the La Seu Vella Cathedral in Lleida and the Las Huelgas de Burgos monastery, burial place of many Castilian-Leonese royals.

== Museum ==
Nowadays the church houses a museum with objects related to Christianity. On display are many wooden figures, some of them carved in the fourteenth century. There are also paintings, books, chalices, and other objects. The museum is primarily aimed at pilgrims travelling along the Camino de Santiago and who pass by its front doors.

A prominent feature of the museum is the magnificent German stained glass rose window, on the north side of the temple. It is from the late fifteenth century and was donated by Iñigo López de Mendoza. It represents, the Eternal Father, in the centre, surrounded by the twelve apostles, six angels and symbols of the four evangelists.

Aside from its permanent collection, the former collegiate is the venue for numerous concerts and short-term exhibitions.

== See also ==
- Castrojeriz
- List of Bien de Interés Cultural in the Province of Burgos
- Romanesque architecture in Spain

== Bibliography ==
- Benavides, Antonio (1860). Memorias de Don Fernando IV de Castilla. Vol. 2 volumes (1st ed.). Madrid: Imprenta de Don José Rodríguez. OCLC 743667836.
- Fernández-Ladreda, Clara; Ibiricu, María Jesús; Arraiza, Jesús (1989). Guía para visitar los santuarios marianos de Navarra. Encuentro. ISBN 8474902126.
- Flórez, Enrique (1824). José del Collado (ed.). España sagrada (2nd ed.). Madrid.
- Ruiz Garrastacho, Ángel (2001). Excmo. Ayto. de Castrojeriz (ed.). Castrojeriz (1st ed.). Editur. pp. 53–65. ISBN 84-955-7804-2.
