= Castle of Peñaranda de Duero =

Castle in Castile and León, Spain

Peñaranda Castle
- Castillo de Peñaranda de Duero
- Peñaranda de Duero, Burgos province, Spain
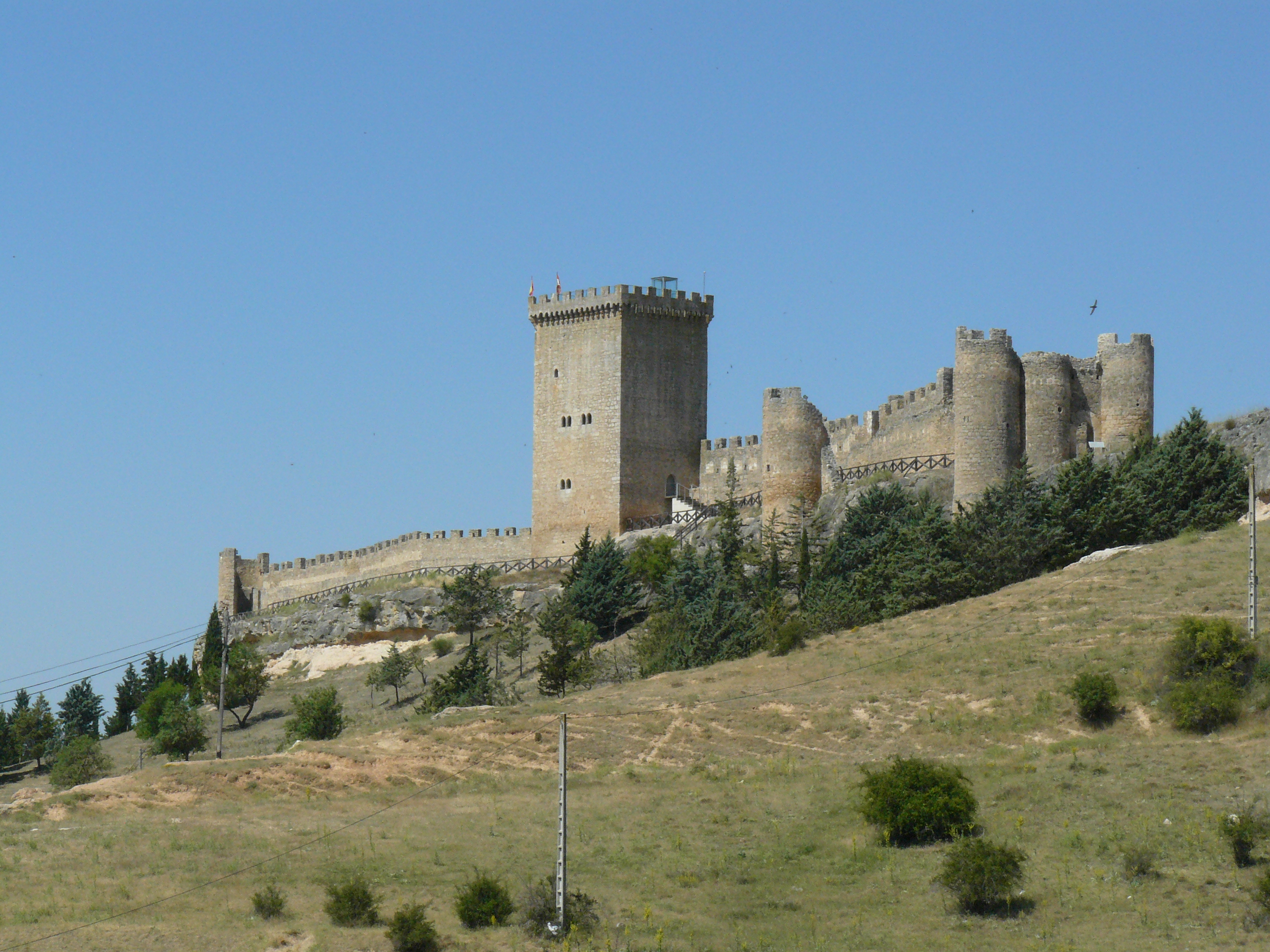
- Castle of Peñaranda, 2011

Site information
- Type: Castle
- Owner: Ministry of Education, Culture and Sport (Spain)
- Controlled by: Kingdom of Castile (10th-11th century); Crown of Castile (11th-18th century)
- Open to the public: Yes
- Condition: Partially preserved

Location
- Coordinates: 41°41′24″N 3°28′53″W

Site history
- Built: 10th century; rebuilt 15th century
- Materials: Ashlar stone

Garrison information
- Past commanders: Counts of Miranda del Castañar (House of Zúñiga):
- Garrison: Diego López de Zúñiga y Guzmán (1457-1479); Pedro de Zúñiga y Avellaneda (1479-1492); Francisco de Zúñiga Avellaneda y Velasco (1492-1536); Juan de Zúñiga y Avellaneda

The castle of Peñaranda de Duero, located in Peñaranda de Duero, Spain, is a well preserved Gothic castle in Burgos province. The castle originally dates from the 10th century but reforms by Counts of Miranda del Castañar in the 15th century changed much of the building. Today the castle stands at the start of a defensive wall that formerly surrounded the town, of which only the crenellated arch of "Las Monjas" still stands.

The castle was an important point on the fortified line which existed between the medieval Christian Kingdom of Castile and the Moor state of Al Andalus during the 10th century. The castle is a narrow walled precinct, with a four-story keep rising from the center. The keep features a rooftop terrace, battlements, a gallery of machiolations, and three additional square towers, two of which flank the ogival arch that marks the entrance. The walls are solid stone ashlar stone, although much of the keep features decorative wooden beams.

Today, the Castle of Peñaranda de Duero serves as one of the many historical monuments and tourist attractions in the area. Tourists are charged an admission fee of €1-2 each for entry.

== Sources ==
- Castillos de España (volumen II). VV.AA.. Editorial Everest, S.A.. León, 1997. (Pgs. 946–950). ISBN 84-2413-832-5
