= Conjunto histórico =

In Spain, the legal designation Conjunto histórico (formerly Conjunto Histórico-Artístico or "Historic-Artistic Grouping") is part of the national system of heritage listing. It is applied to buildings in a given locality. It is typically used to protect complete villages, such as Peñaranda de Duero, or historic quarters of towns such as Avilés.

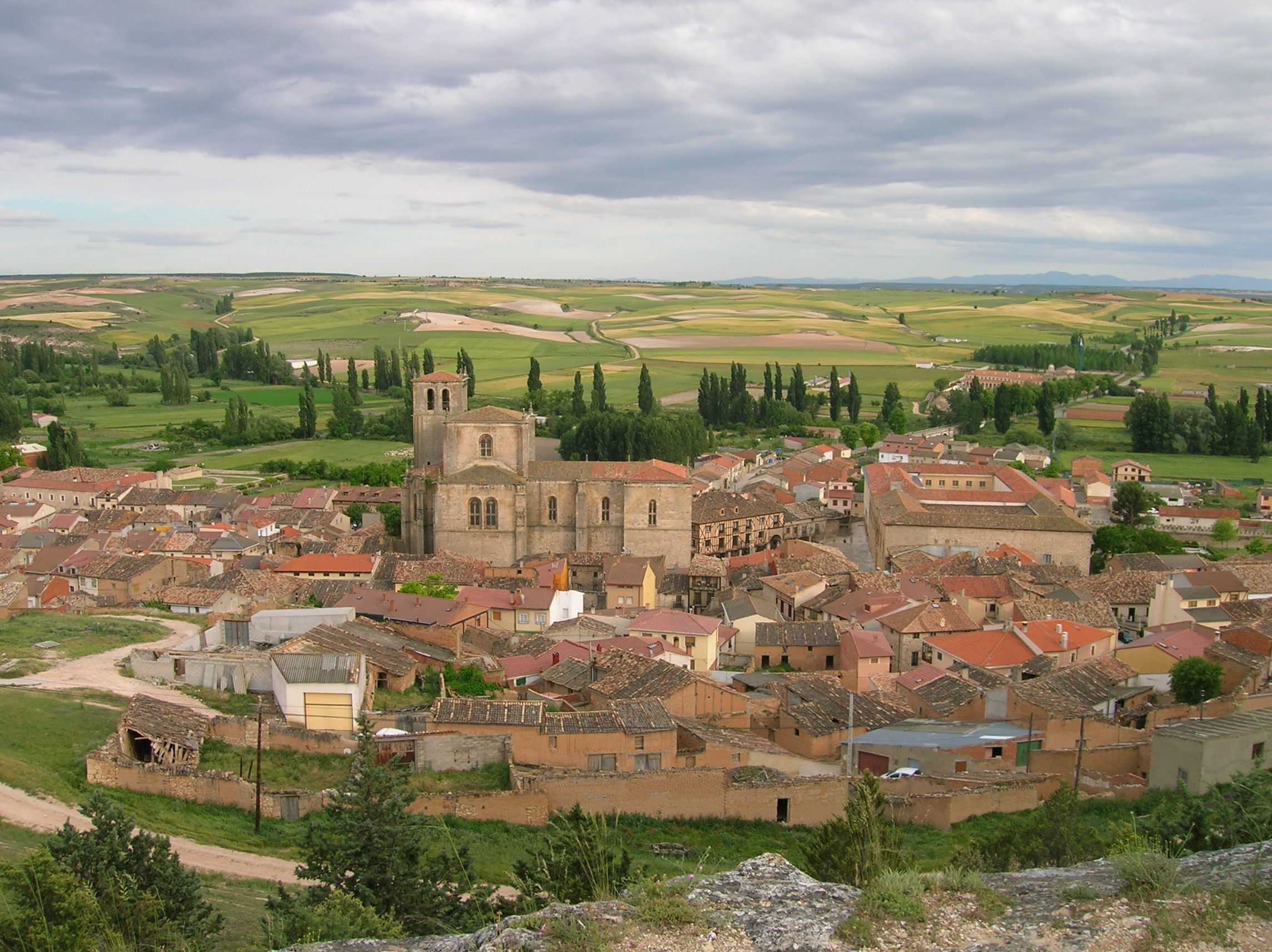
Peñaranda de Duero, a medieval walled village

Conjunto means "group", and as a group listing, the Conjunto histórico is comparable with the British concept of a Conservation Area. Conjunto histórico is a sub-category within a broader category of Bien de Interés Cultural, which protects Spain's cultural heritage and is regulated by the country's Ministry of Culture. As well as conjuntos históricos, the category of Bien de Interés Cultural includes the following sub-categories of non-movable heritage:

- Jardín histórico, historic garden (for example the gardens of Aranjuez)
- Monumento
- Sitio histórico (for example the Bulls of Guisando)
- Zona arqueológica, archaeological zone (for example the Archaeological Site of Atapuerca)

A Conjunto histórico may include buildings which are individually protected as monuments, as is the case at, for example, Peñaranda de Duero or Covarrubias.

== Examples ==
- Nogal de las Huertas (1931)
- Avilés (1955)
- Covarrubias (1965)
- Sos del Rey Católico (1968)
- Daroca (1968)
- Sanlúcar de Barrameda (1973)
- Peñaranda de Duero (1974)
- Santa Cruz de La Palma (1975)
- La Orotava (1976)
- Garachico (1994)
- Gumiel de Izán (2003)
- Frías (2005)

== See also ==
- UNESCO World Heritage Site
