= Partido de la Sierra en Tobalina =

Coordinates: 42°43′00″N 3°14′00″W

- Municipality
- Flag Coat of arms

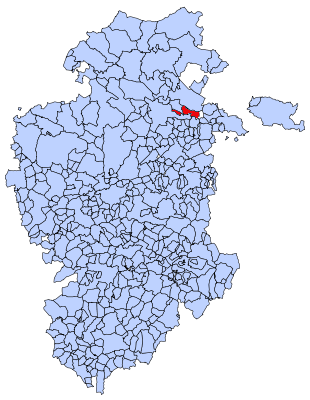
- Municipal location of Partido de la Sierra en Tobalina in Burgos province
- Country: Spain
- Autonomous community: Castile and León
- Province: Burgos
- Comarca: Las Merindades
- Municipality: Partido de la Sierra en Tobalina
- Seat: Valderrama

Area
  - Total: 30 km^{2} (12 sq mi)
- Elevation: 618 m (2,028 ft)

Population (2025-01-01)
  - Total: 75
  - Density: 2.5/km^{2} (6.5/sq mi)
- Time zone: UTC+1 (CET)
  - Summer (DST): UTC+2 (CEST)
- Postal code: 09211

Partido de la Sierra en Tobalina is a municipality located in the province of Burgos, Castile and León, Spain. According to the 2004 census (INE), the municipality has a population of 68 inhabitants. Its seat is in Valderrama.
