= Valle de Tobalina =

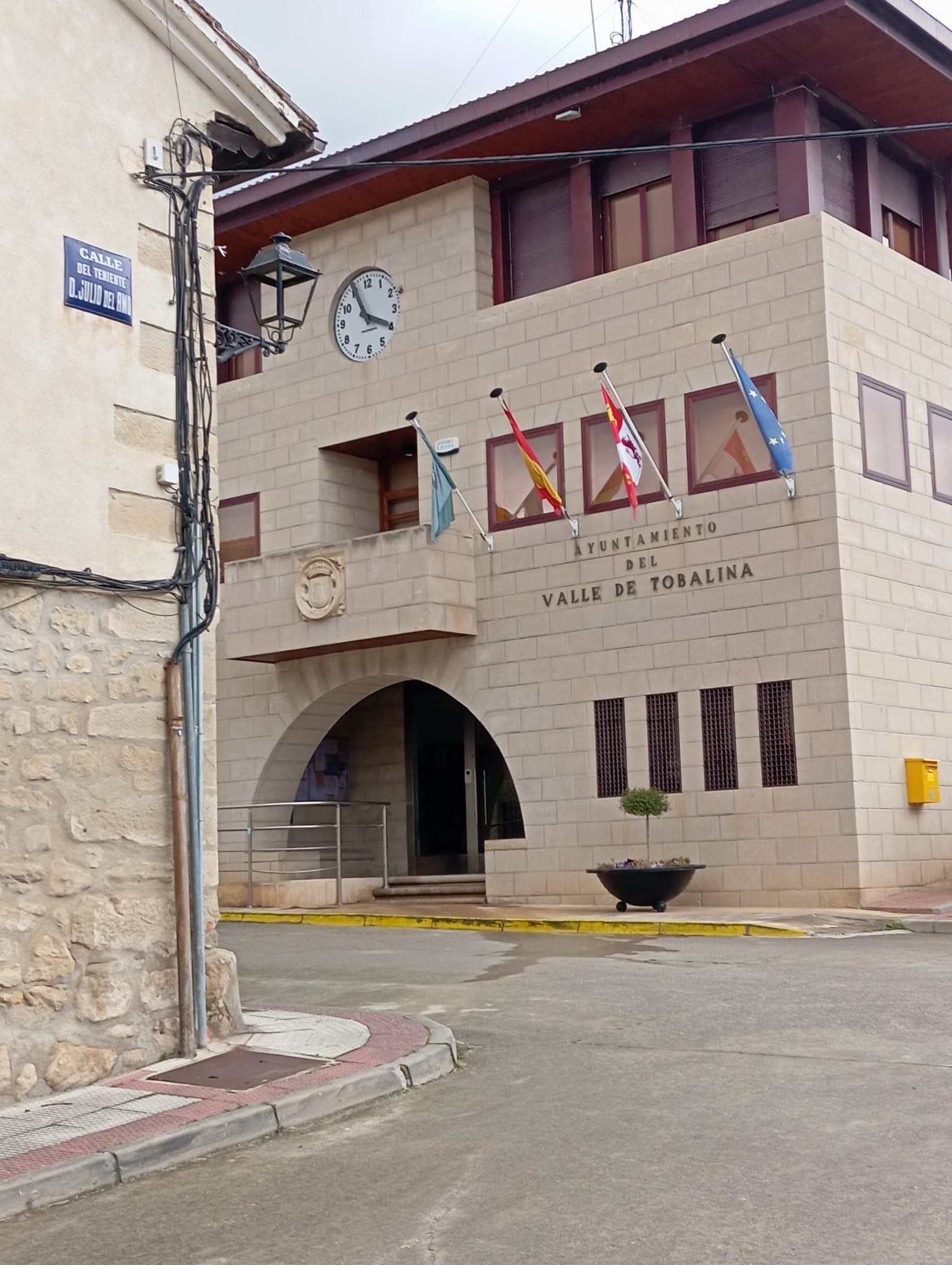
- Town hall

- Flag Coat of arms

- Location in Spain.
- Coordinates: 42°47′32″N 3°16′14″W
- Country: Spain
- Autonomous community: Castile and León
- Province: Burgos
- Comarca: Ebro-Nela

Government
  - Mayor: Rafael González Mediavilla

Area
  - Total: 157.49 km^{2} (60.81 sq mi)
- Elevation: 565 m (1,854 ft)

Population (2025-01-01)
  - Total: 877
  - Density: 5.57/km^{2} (14.4/sq mi)
- Time zone: UTC+1 (CET)
  - Summer (DST): UTC+2 (CEST)
- Website: Official website

Valle de Tobalina is a municipality located in the province of Burgos, Castile and León, northern Spain. As of 2010 (data from INE), the municipality has a population of 1,069 inhabitants.

The capital of the municipality is the village of Quintana-Martín Galíndez. Another village in the municipality is Gabanes.
