= Frias Castle =

Defensive construction in Frías, Burgos's province, Spain

Frías Castle
- Castillo de los Duques de Frías
- Frías, Burgos, Spain
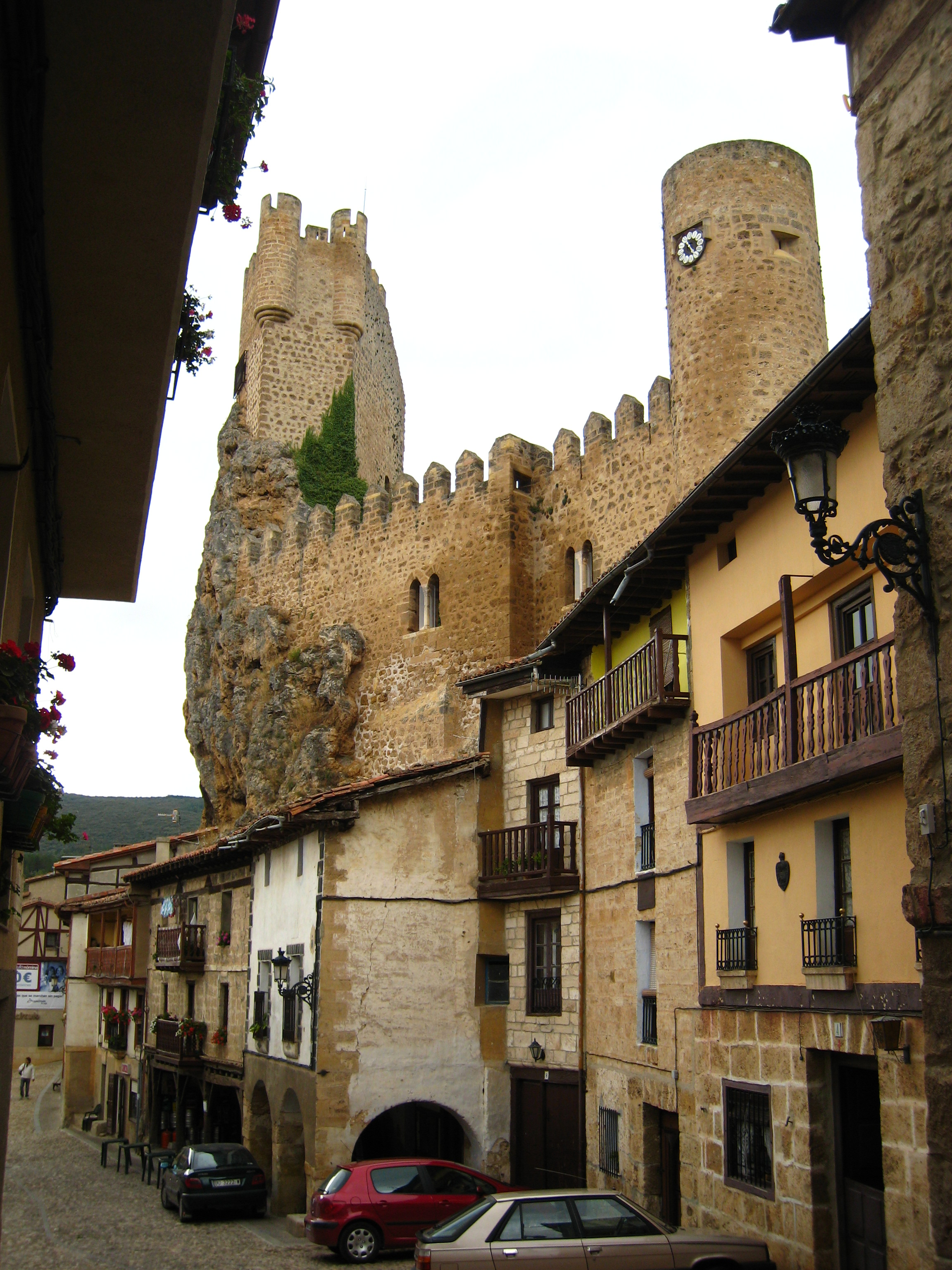
- Castle of Frías view from the town, 2007

Site information
- Type: Castle
- Owner: Ayuntamiento de Frías
- Controlled by: Kingdom of Castile (10th-11th century); Crown of Castile (11th-18th century)
- Open to the public: Yes
- Condition: Partly preserved

Site history
- Built: 10th century; rebuilt 15th century
- Materials: Stone

Garrison information
- Past commanders: House of Armengol (until 1201); Alfonso VIII (1201-1205); Dukes of Frías (House of Velasco): Bernardino Fernández de Velasco (1492-1512); Íñigo Fernández de Velasco y López de Mendoza (1512-1528); Pedro Fernández de Velasco (1528-1559); Íñigo Fernández de Velasco y Girón (1559-1585); Juan Fernández de Velasco (1585-1613)

Frías Castle is the castle of the Dukes of Frías, located in Frías (Burgos province), overlooking the Tobalina valley. It was built between the 12th and 15th century.

== Gallery ==
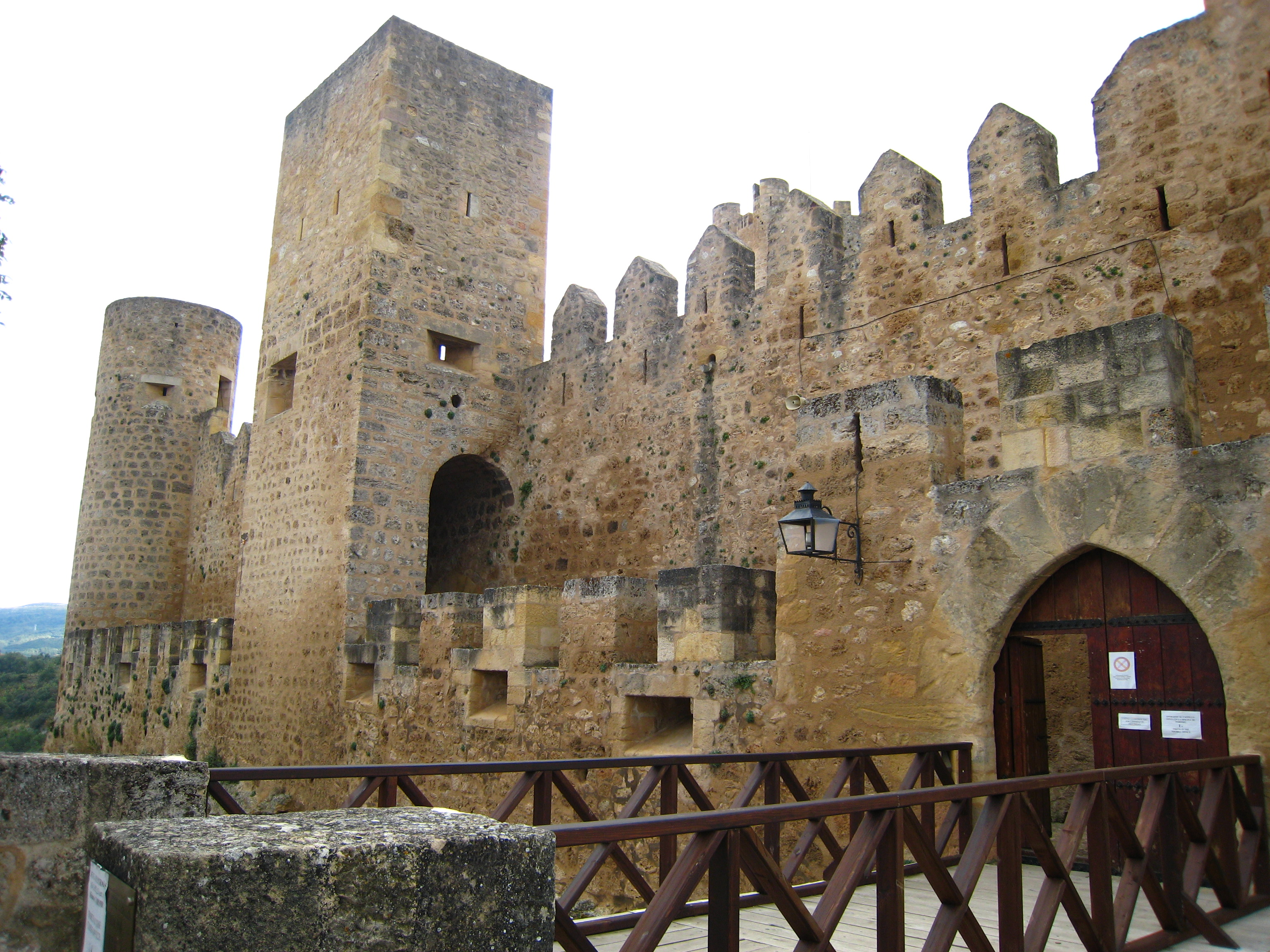
Main entrance

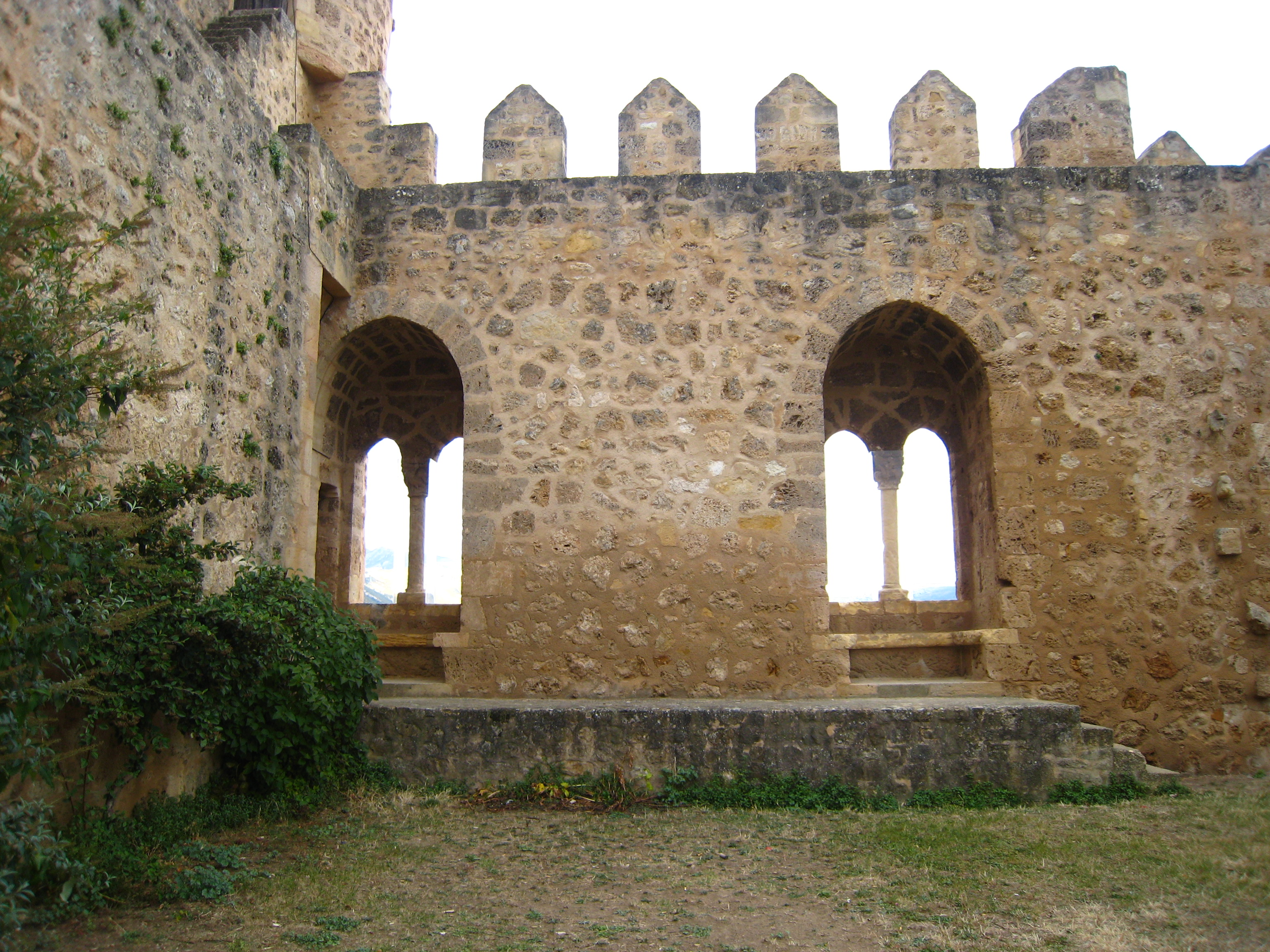
Romanesque windows

== Sources ==
- The information in this article is based on that in its Spanish equivalent.
- Castillos de Burgos. Javier Remón Bernard. Ediciones Lancia. Madrid, 1993. ISBN 9788486205447
