= Peñaranda de Duero =

Coordinates: 41°41′N 3°29′W

- Municipality and town
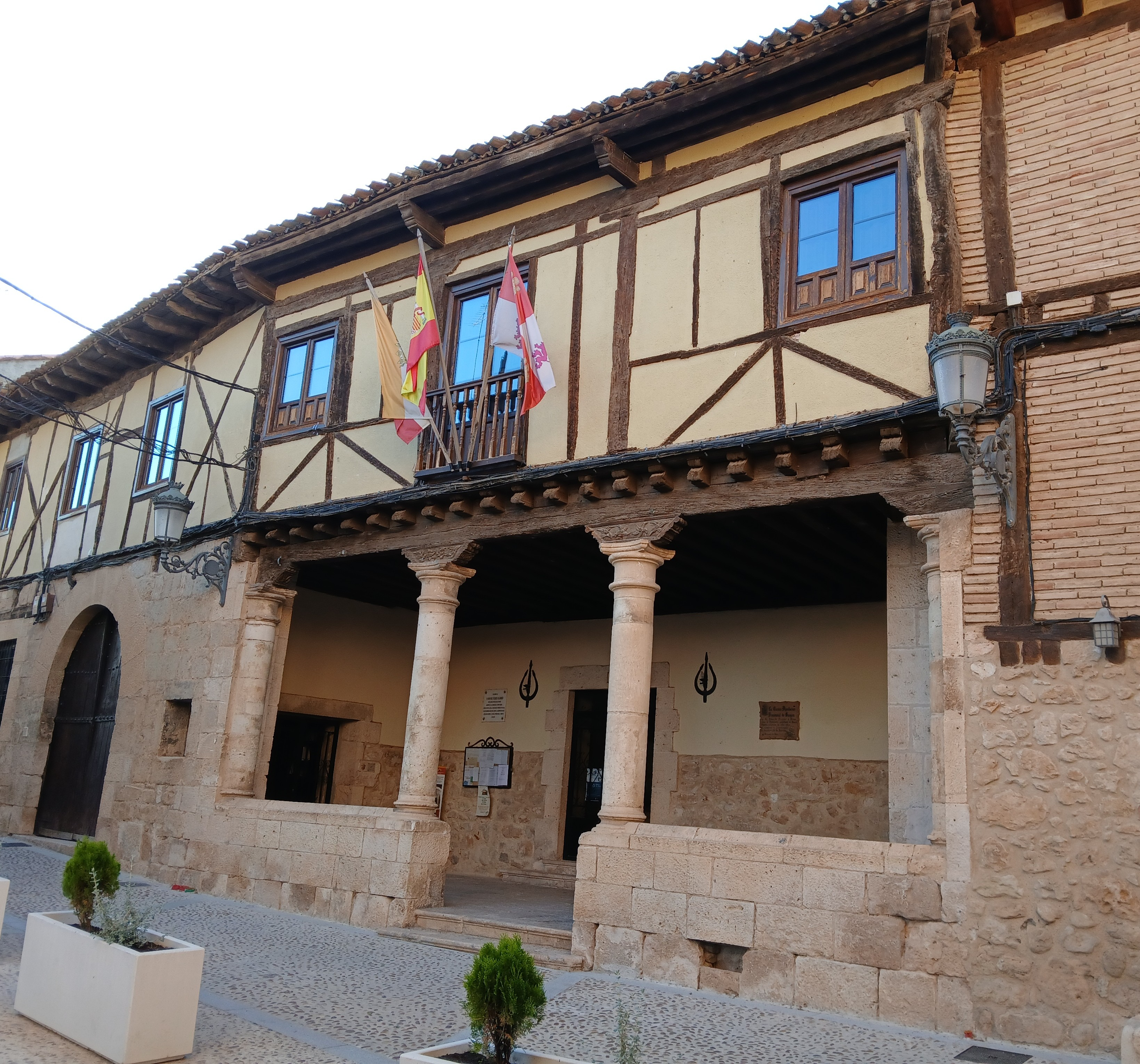
- Town hall

- Flag Coat of arms
- Interactive map of Peñaranda de Duero
- Country: Spain
- Autonomous community: Castile and León
- Province: Burgos
- Comarca: Ribera del Duero

Area
  - Total: 64 km^{2} (25 sq mi)
- Elevation: 852 m (2,795 ft)

Population (2025-01-01)
  - Total: 470
  - Density: 7.3/km^{2} (19/sq mi)
- Time zone: UTC+1 (CET)
  - Summer (DST): UTC+2 (CEST)
- Postal code: 09410
- Website: http://www.peñarandadeduero.es/

Spanish Cultural Heritage
- Type: Non-movable
- Criteria: Historic ensemble
- Designated: 25 April 1974
- Reference no.: RI-53-0000170

Peñaranda de Duero is a village and municipio located in the province of Burgos, Castile and León, Spain. According to the 2004 census (INE), the municipality has a population of 583 inhabitants.

The village is conserved as a conjunto histórico, a type of conservation area. Several buildings are additionally protected as monuments.

== Main sights ==
- Castle of Peñaranda de Duero (10th–15th century)
- Palace of the Counts of Miranda (16th century)
- Collegiate church of St. Anne
- Justice pillar
