= Villahoz =

- Flag Coat of arms
- Interactive map of Villahoz
- Coordinates: 42°05′N 3°55′W
- Municipality: Burgos

Government
  - Mayor: Leopoldo Quevedo Rojo (PSOE)

Area
  - Total: 51 km^{2} (20 sq mi)
  - Land: 51 km^{2} (20 sq mi)
  - Water: 0.00 km^{2} (0 sq mi)

Population (2025-01-01)
  - Total: 262
- Time zone: UTC+1 (CET)
  - Summer (DST): UTC+2 (CEST)
- Website: https://web.archive.org/web/20051214204427/http://www.aytovillahoz.com:80/

Villahoz is a village and municipality in the province of Burgos, Spain. The village is in the wine region known as Ribera del Arlanza, 15 km from Lerma.

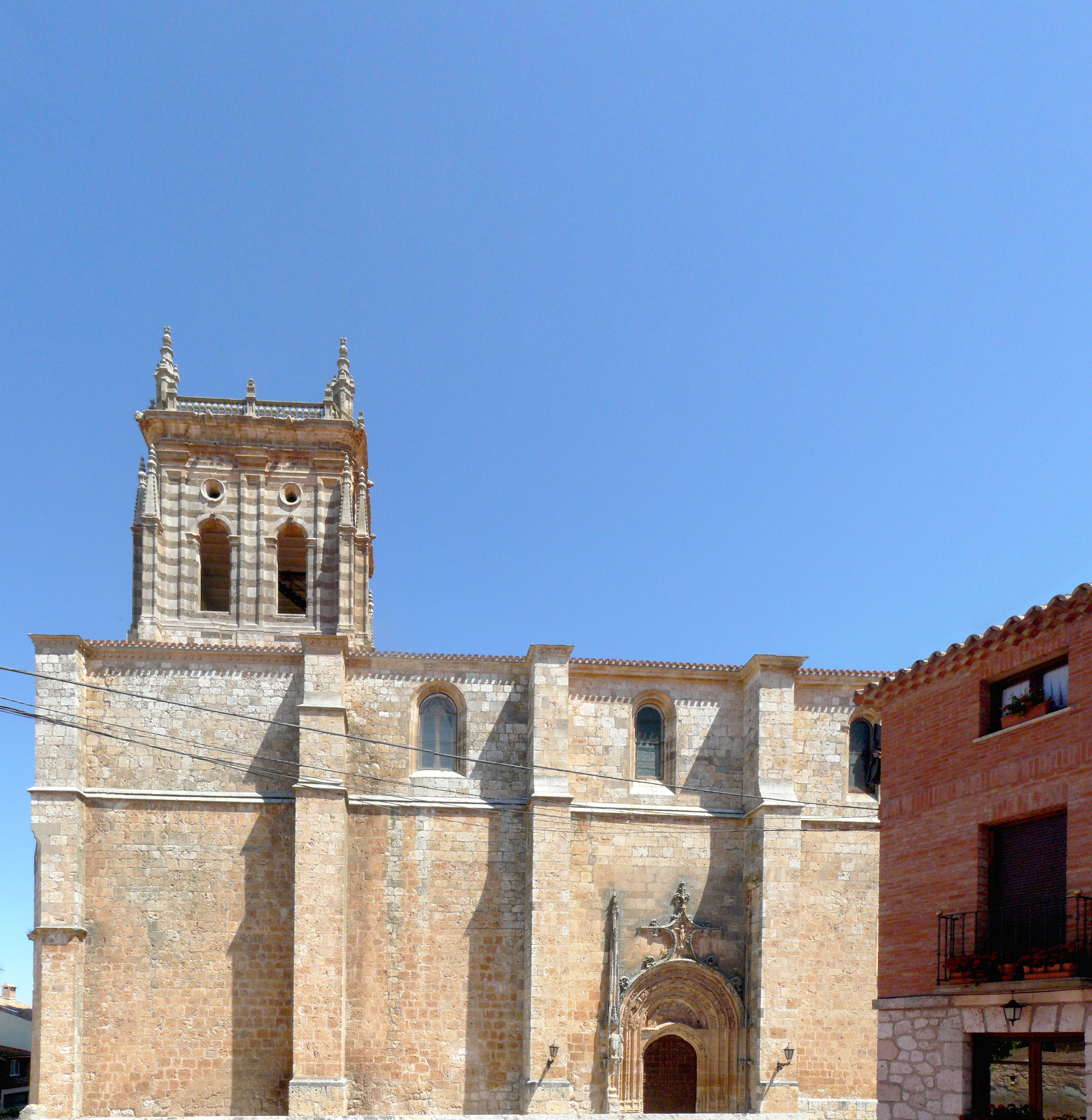
Church of Our Lady of the Assumption, Villahoz, Burgos

== History ==
Villahoz was likely founded in the late 9th century by Mozarab settlers, Christians who had migrated north to escape Islamic rule in central and southern parts of the Iberian Peninsula. The origin of the name is uncertain but may be Mozarabic. The earliest known written reference to Villahoz appears in the Carta de Arras of El Cid from 1079, where it is recorded as Villa Fabze. The same document mentions Escobare and Matricale, two former settlements now within the municipality's boundaries.

During the Middle Ages, Villahoz was classified as a behetría, a type of settlement where inhabitants could freely select their lord. By the end of the period, it had become part of the royal domain (realengo). It is listed in the Becerro de las Behetrías under the jurisdiction of the Merindad of Cerrato, though at times it was also associated with the Merindad of Candemuñó. The town experienced a period of relative prosperity from the late Middle Ages through the 16th century, after which it entered a gradual decline.

== Demographics ==
As of 2024, the municipality has a population of 277 inhabitants, according to the Spanish National Statistics Institute (INE).

== Heritage and Architecture ==
The historic center of Villahoz was declared a Bien de Interés Cultural (Asset of Cultural Interest) in the category of Historic Site on 2 November 1983.

The town preserves a significant collection of traditional Castilian architecture. Many buildings feature stone ground floors and brick or adobe upper levels, often incorporating timber framing. Numerous agricultural structures such as granaries, corrals, barns, and stables remain as testimony to the area's rural past. A notable feature of Villahoz is the concentration of several hundred wine cellars situated on a small hill overlooking the town. These small-scale cellars were primarily used for domestic wine production; some retain original elements such as presses and wooden beams, and a few continue to operate.

Church of Our Lady of the Assumption The parish church, dedicated to the Assumption of Mary, is the most prominent structure in the municipality. The current building, constructed in the 16th century, represents the Renaissance hall church typology and replaced an earlier Gothic structure. The church is distinguished by its large dimensions, balanced proportions, and restrained decoration. It was declared a Bien de Interés Cultural in the category of Monument on 14 November 1991.

=== Gothic Pillory ===
The town's main square, characterized by Castilian arcades, contains a jurisdictional pillory (rollo), built in the late 15th century in the flamboyant Gothic style. It features an octagonal base, sculpted heads of lions and dogs symbolizing justice and royal authority, decorative columns, and a conical pinnacle topped with a cross and weather vane. The pillory reflects Villahoz's direct subordination to the Crown and its judicial autonomy during the medieval period.

Hermitage of Our Lady of Madrigal The Hermitage of Our Lady of Madrigal is located approximately two kilometers north of the town, on an elevated site. According to local legend, the hermitage was founded after a group of wood merchants transporting stolen timber and a hidden image of the Virgin were unable to move their oxen until they removed the statue. The sanctuary was subsequently built on the site of the event.

The present structure has Romanesque origins, although later modifications have obscured most of its original form, with only the semicircular apse and a northern Gothic portal remaining. The interior features a Baroque altarpiece by the Cortés del Valle brothers, housing a statue of the Virgin. Part of the nave is covered by a Gothic vault decorated with 18th-century paintings, which conceal fire damage from the destruction of the original 14th-century Mudejar ceiling. The sacristy serves as a chapel and contains numerous ex-votos offered by pilgrims.

An ancient mulberry tree stands nearby, traditionally associated with historical town meetings. An annual pilgrimage is held on or near 31 May, attracting participants from Villahoz and surrounding communities.

== Fortifications ==
In the Middle Ages, Villahoz was surrounded by defensive walls. Remnants of the fortifications and two of the original gates have survived. The general outline of the former walls is still discernible in the layout of several streets, particularly Las Pilas and Las Cabas, the latter having functioned as a defensive ditch.

The Tower Gate and the Fountain Gate, located at opposite ends of Calle Real, date from the late 14th century and reflect the functional simplicity typical of medieval military architecture.

=== Hermitage of Vera Cruz ===
The Hermitage of Vera Cruz, located on the northern edge of the town, is one of two surviving hermitages from over fifteen documented in the 18th century. The structure consists of a single nave, with a 16th-century vaulted chancel and an 18th-century timber ceiling (par y hilera) featuring carved beams. A Baroque altarpiece originally housed a 14th-century crucifix, which has since been replaced by a life-sized photographic reproduction; the original is now preserved in the parish church.

The building combines ashlar masonry in the chancel with rubble stonework in the nave. A wooden cornice with sculpted brackets once adorned the exterior but was removed in the mid-20th century.

=== Talamanca Bridge ===
The Talamanca Bridge crosses the Arlanza River approximately four kilometers south of Villahoz, near the municipal boundary with Torrepadre but within Villahoz’s jurisdiction. Archaeological remains suggest possible Roman activity in the area, and a settlement existed at the site until the late Middle Ages. While the bridge may have Roman origins, the present structure reflects medieval construction with substantial later modifications that have altered its original appearance.
