= Presencio =

Coordinates: 42°11′N 3°54′W

- Municipality and town
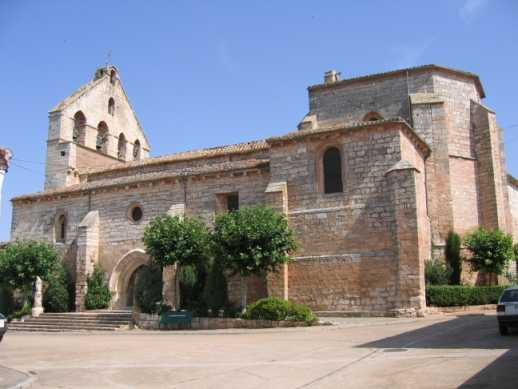
- San Andrés church (16th century)

- Flag Coat of arms
- Interactive map of Presencio
- Country: Spain
- Autonomous community: Castile and León
- Province: Burgos
- Comarca: Arlanza

Area
  - Total: 35.35 km^{2} (13.65 sq mi)

Population (2025-01-01)
  - Total: 212
  - Density: 6.00/km^{2} (15.5/sq mi)
- Time zone: UTC+1 (CET)
  - Summer (DST): UTC+2 (CEST)
- Postal code: 09228
- Website: http://www.presencio.es/

Presencio is a municipality and town located in the province of Burgos, Castile and León, Spain. According to the 2004 census (INE), the municipality has a population of 238 inhabitants. It contains the Church of San Andrés.
