= Church of San Andrés (Presencio) =

- Iglesia Parroquial de San Andrés (Spanish)
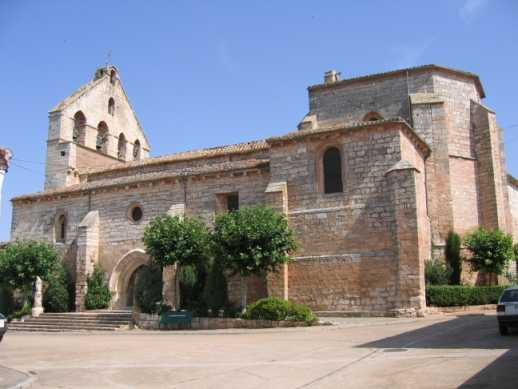

- Location within Spain
- 42.186403°N 3.902279°W
- Location: Presencio, Spain

Spanish Cultural Heritage
- Official name: Iglesia Parroquial de San Andrés
- Type: Non-movable
- Criteria: Monument
- Designated: 1983
- Reference no.: RI-51-0004897

The Church of San Andrés (Spanish: Iglesia Parroquial de San Andrés) is a church located in Presencio, Spain. It was declared Bien de Interés Cultural in 1983.
