= Frías, Province of Burgos =

Frías
- Municipality and city
- Ciudad de Frías
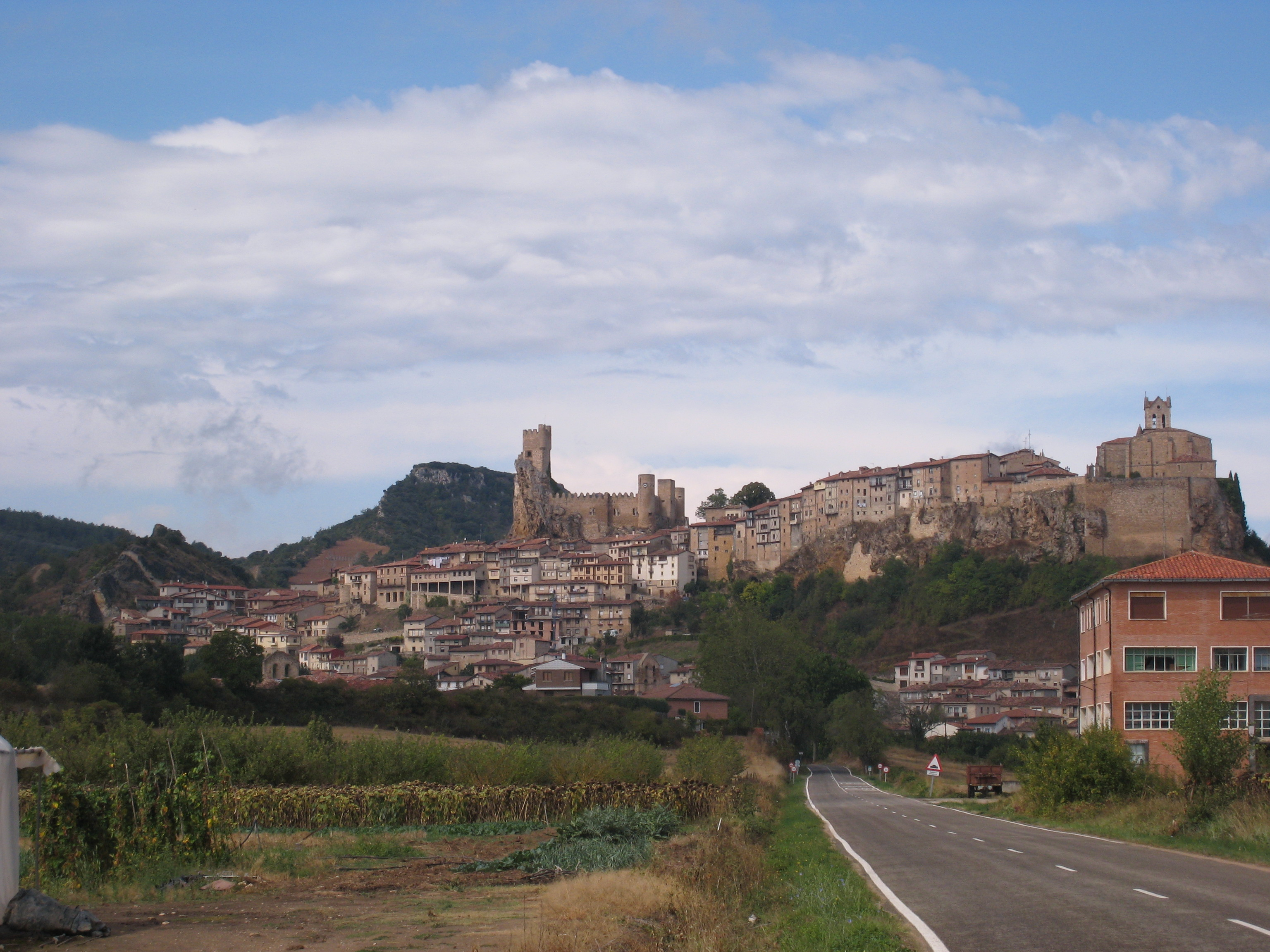
- Panoramic view of Frías, 2007

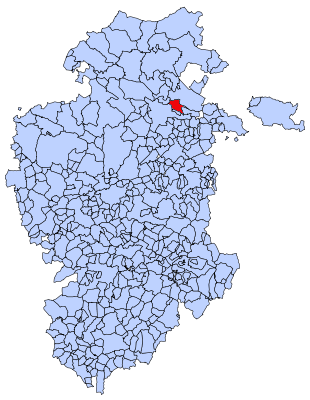
- Municipal location of Frías in Burgos province
- Coordinates: 42°45′42″N 3°17′39″W
- Country: Spain
- Autonomous community: Castile and León
- Province: Burgos
- Comarca: Las Merindades

Area
  - Total: 32 km^{2} (12 sq mi)
- Elevation: 555 m (1,821 ft)

Population (2025-01-01)
  - Total: 258
  - Density: 8.1/km^{2} (21/sq mi)
- Time zone: UTC+1 (CET)
  - Summer (DST): UTC+2 (CEST)
- Postal code: 09211
- Website: http://www.ciudaddefrias.es/
- Frías is the smallest settlement with the city title in Spain

Frías is a town located in the northern part of the province of Burgos, in Castile and León, Spain. In 2010 it had a population of only 275 inhabitants.

Frías is a historic medieval town on a hill above the river Ebro, and has been a strategic point to cross the river on routes leading to the Cantabrian Sea. Today the town is a popular tourist spot. It has an impressive castle dominating the river and the twelfth-century bridge across it. It is considered to be the smallest "city" in Spain, having been given that title in 1435.

There are two convents and two churches in the town. The gothic church of San Vitores is particularly worth visiting.

== Geography ==
=== Location ===
Frías is around 80 km northeast of Burgos, on the banks of the Ebro river. Its county territory covers 29,37 km^{2}.

Northwest: Cillaperlata	North: Valle de Tobalina	Northeast: Valle de Tobalina
West: Oña	75px	East: Partido de la Sierra en Tobalina
Southwest Oña	South: Partido de la Sierra en Tobalina	Southeast: Oña

== Main sights ==
- Frias Castle (12th–15th century).
- Hanging houses.
- The medieval bridge. Near the town, crossing the Ebro river, a 12th-century bridge with a defensive tower that dates from the 14th century.
- San Vitores church.

== History ==
Frias is aptly named in homage to the temperature of the water that flowed from the mountainous peaks draining into the Tobalina Valley. There is first mention of Frias in the late 9th century but after the year 1000, it was incorporated into the kingdom of Navarre located in Burgos. Frias’ history is one that includes war which fueled its growth and development even when controlled by adversaries.

As the kingdom of Navarre, Frias was controlled by King Sancho III the Great. In 1504, Navarre was defeated in battle and reincorporated into Castile. Frias would go on to be controlled by Diego Lopez de Haro, the Lord of Biscay in the late 11th century and Alfonso VIII in 1200.

After 1201, Frias was granted a set of laws and sense of freedom by Alfonso VIII that allowed them the right of succession, ability to elect a mayor, and tools to stimulate their economy. With these laws enacted, Frias was able to thrive and prosper until it was granted the title of city by King John II in 1435.

In the summer of 1450, Frias was overrun by a Balmaseda army of 1500 men; however, the Frias townspeople joined together and successfully attacked the army. This attack is celebrated every year in an event called Fiesta del Capitan. Frias would continue to experience ebbs and flows of bondage and freedom until 1811 when feudalism was abolished in all of Spain.

== Politics ==
Frías has usually been ruled by the Socialist Party (PSOE). From 2007 to 2015 the Major was Luis Arranz from People's Party (PP). In 2007, reaching an agreement with the left party IU, and in 2011 with absolute majority. In the May 2015 elections, PSOE recovered the power with absolute majority, and retained this state in the 2019 elections.

=== Elections results 2019 ===
- PSOE: 99 votes, 5 seats
- PP: 43 votes, 2 seats

== Heritage ==
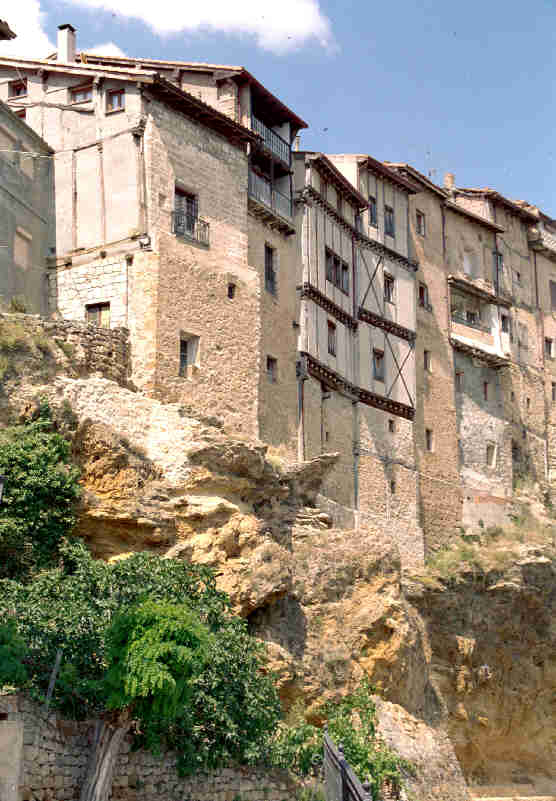
Hanging houses

The medieval old town has been declared Conjunto Histórico and retains its urban structure and special construction features.

=== Hanging houses ===
These houses, with a ground floor and two or three additional floors and, eventually, a wine cellar, are supported by each other, creating streets at different heights. In some cases these houses hang from the rock. Their structure is made of walls of limestone within a supporting timber frame.

The houses are located in the streets that climb the hill on which Velasco's Castle and San Vicente church are built. A wall partially surrounds the old town and retains two arches from the three initially erected: puerta del Postigo and puerta de Medina.

These arches are also made of limestone and wood, materials that make them blend into the rock. They are found in Obdulio Fernández Street and can be seen from the streets: "Antonio Carpintero, Mayor de San Vitores, Federico Keller and Campa de las eras."

=== Salazar Palace and barracks ===
This building is in Alfonso VIII Square, close to the castle. Initially it was the palace of the Salazar's family, and a coat of arms can be found over its door with the thirteen stars of the Salazars. A Saint Francis lace surrounds the stars. Later it was used as residential barracks and today is the Tourism Office of Frías.

=== Roman Road ===
An important Roman road connecting the Castilian plateau and the north of Spain cross Frías by a ford of the Ebro River 500 meters east of the Romanic bridge. In addition, Frías was also the start of another Roman road connecting this area with La Rioja. It passes by La Canaleja, Rueda, Ronda, Rincón de Soto and Calzada streets.

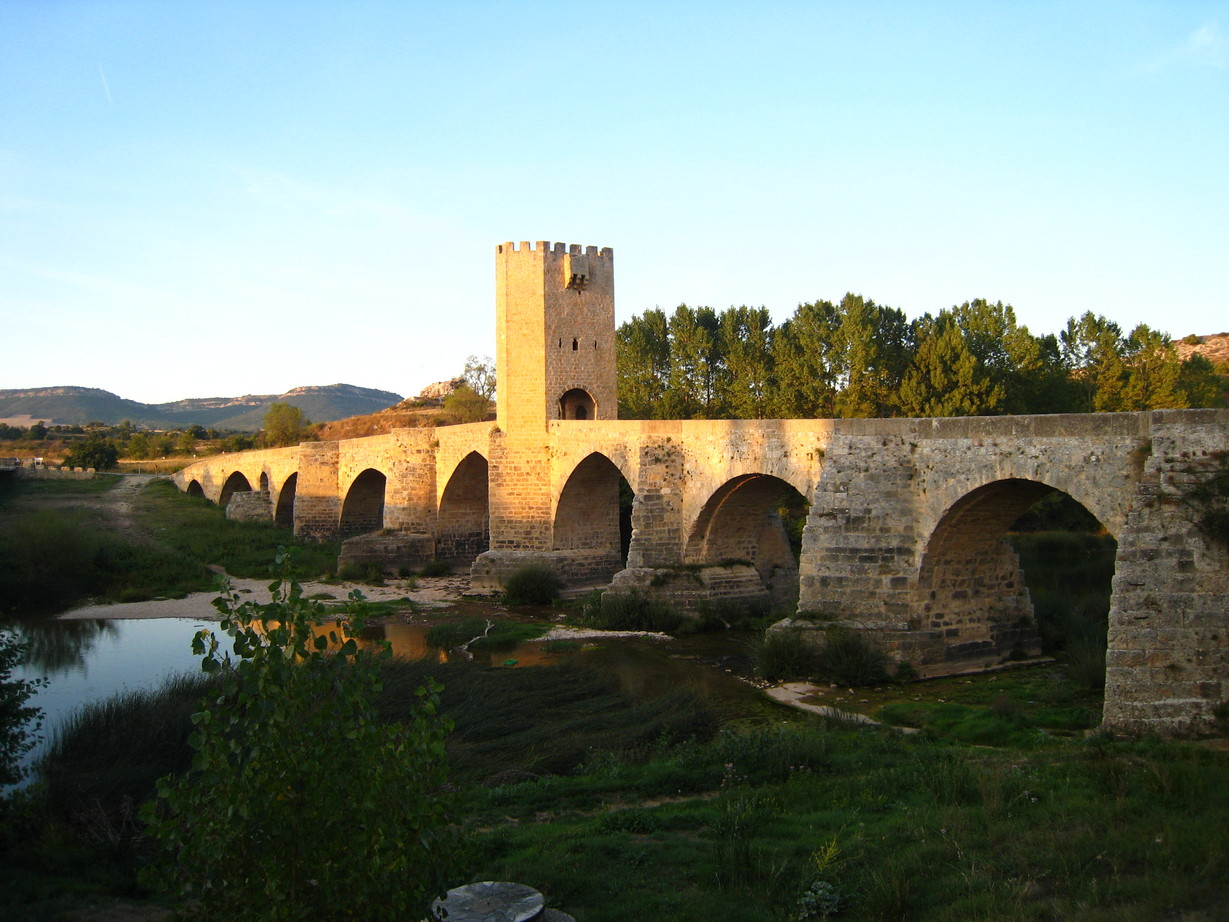
Medieval Bridge

=== Medieval Bridge ===
Frías' medieval bridge is 143 meters in length and has 9 arches. It was built in a Romanic style, and refurbished in the 14th century when a defensive tower with arrow-holes and battlements were built in the center. This tower also functioned as a medieval toll point called “cobro del pontazgo”. The bridge connects Avenida del Salero and Avenida de Santa María del Puente.

=== Jewish quarter ===
The Jewish quarter, almost unknown until the final decades of the 20th century, was important in its time. Mentions of Jewish inhabitants during the 14th century can be found in the cartulary of Santa María de Vadillo, although there are references even from the previous century. For instance, in 1387, someone called Nahamías was recognized as a neighbor. Even in 1574 in some documents the converted “tax collector of Frías” from the mid 15th century, Juan Sanz de la Ussa, was recalled, wondering if he had been executed or forgiven. Juan Sanz de la Ussa worked as a tax collector for the Velasco family and founded the Visitación chapel. The Jewish quarter was located on calle Convenio and calle Virgen de la Candonga.

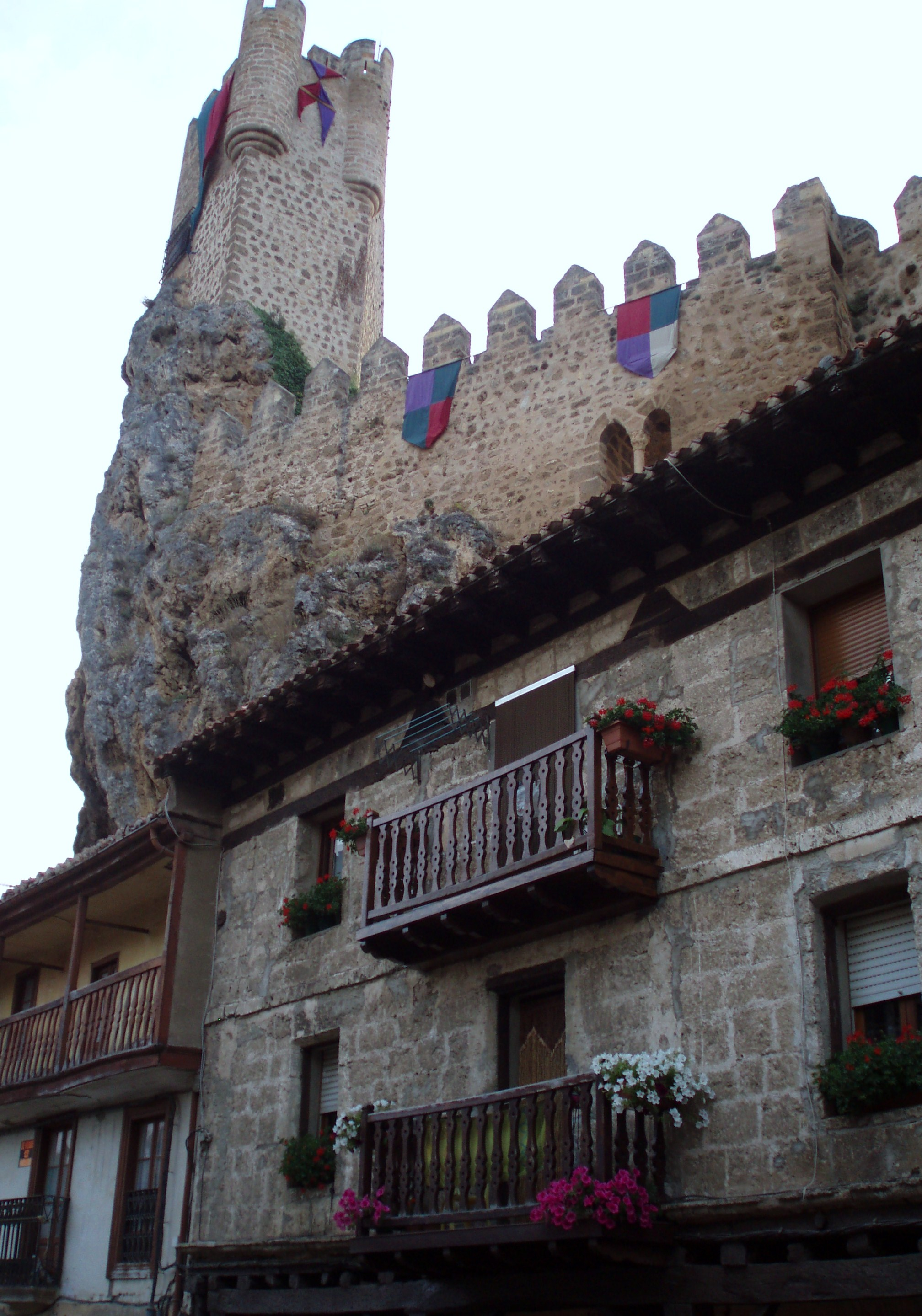

=== Duke of Velasco or Frias Castle ===
On the top of “La Muela” hill, its strategic position provides a view of the valley and the bridge, 20m above the Ebro River.

The first mention of the castle dates back to 867. What can be seen today was built in the last years of the 12th century and the beginning of the 13th century, under the reign of Alfonso VIII. The castle has a main defensive function. The tower keep is detached from the rest of the castle, with its own defensive system.

A bridge over the moat (originally a drawbridge) gives access to the main door. The castle's defense is based on the strategic location of the tower keep on the top of a big rock. High walls with battlements and arrow-holes protect the entire castle. Around the parade ground, the rest of the original buildings, such as barns and cellars, can be found.

The tower keep can be visited, and from its top visitors can find excellent views of the city and its environment. This tower has partially collapsed at least three times in history, last time in 1830, with a death toll of 30 people. This event was related to the explosion of the wall by the French army under Napoleon.

=== Other monuments ===
- San Francisco Convent building from the 14th century. Initially built as a convent, it has been used for different purposes, such as private housing.
- Santa María de Vadillo Convent erected in 1219 by Diego Faro, was the home of an Augustinian community. Was also used as a hospital. It style combines gothic and renaissance, like the well-preserved church. After the Confiscation of Mendizábal in 1833, it was abandoned.
- San Vítores Church built between 13th and 14th centuries in Gothic style.

== Notable people ==
- Manuel Bernal de Huidobro (1656–1716), general and governor of Sinaloa (Mexico) from 1734 to 1741.
- Pedro Fernández de Frías: Great Cardinal of Spain and Bishop of y Osma.

== Gallery ==
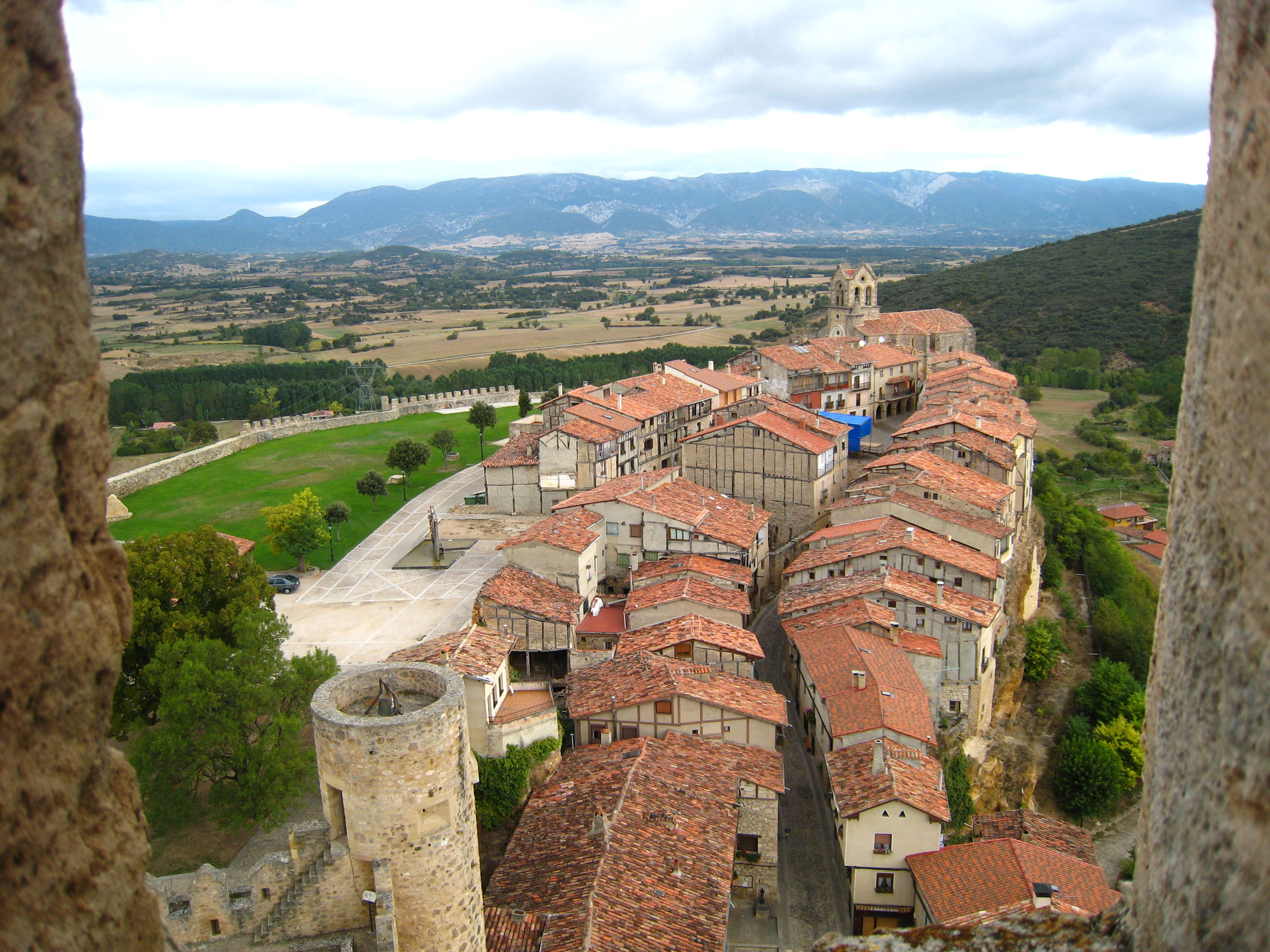
View of Frías from the castle

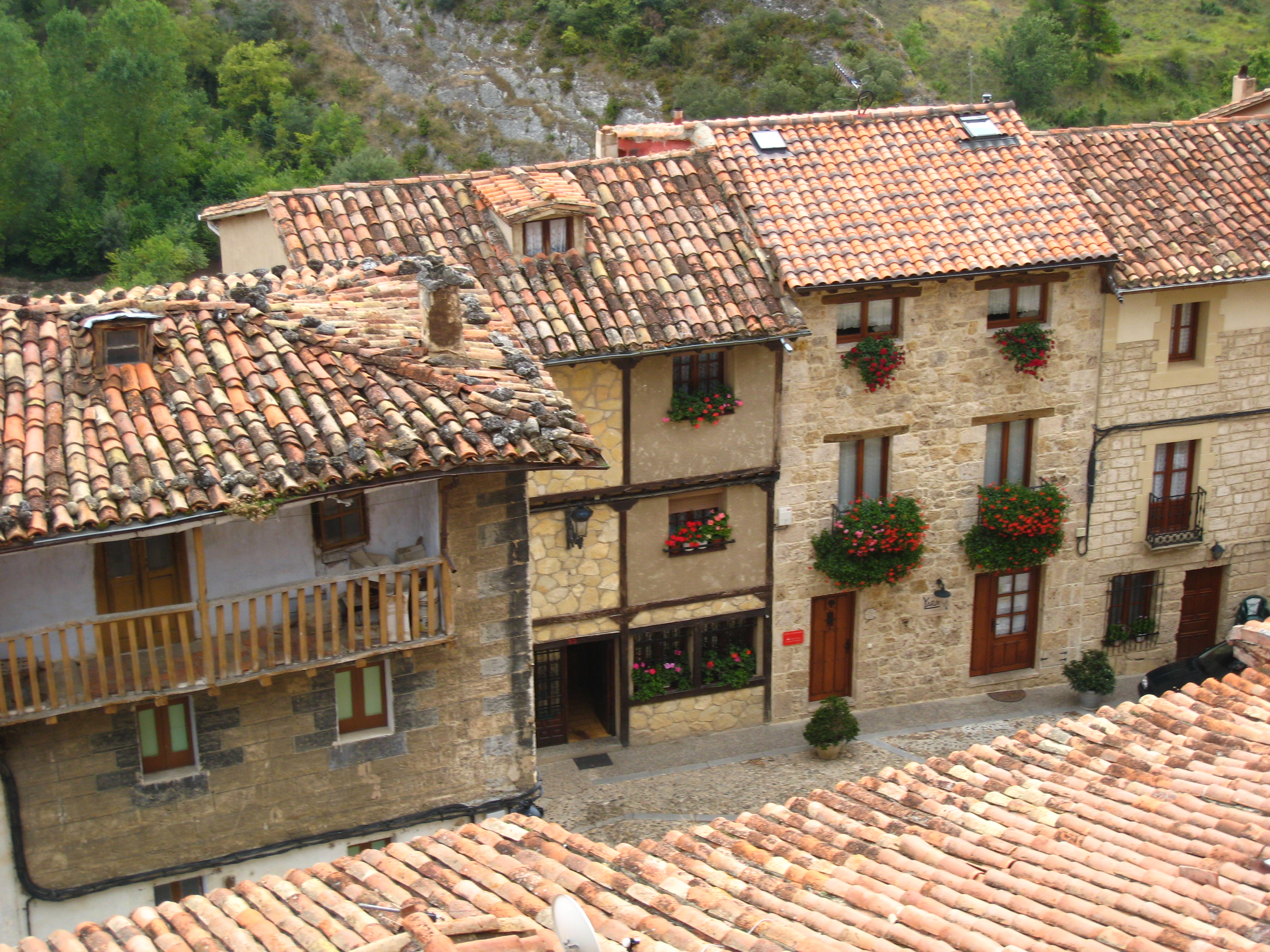
Typical houses

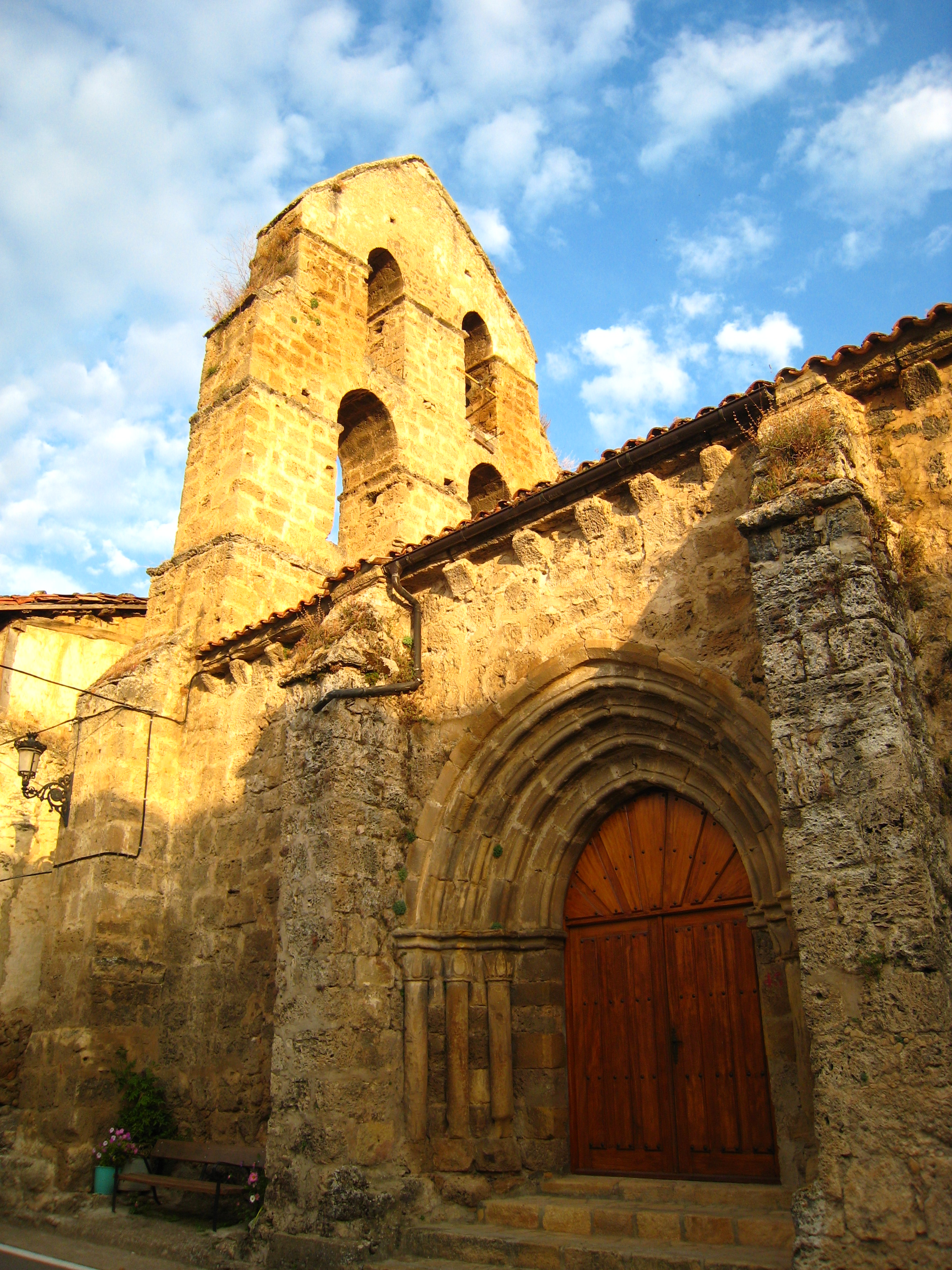
San Vitores church (13th-14th century)

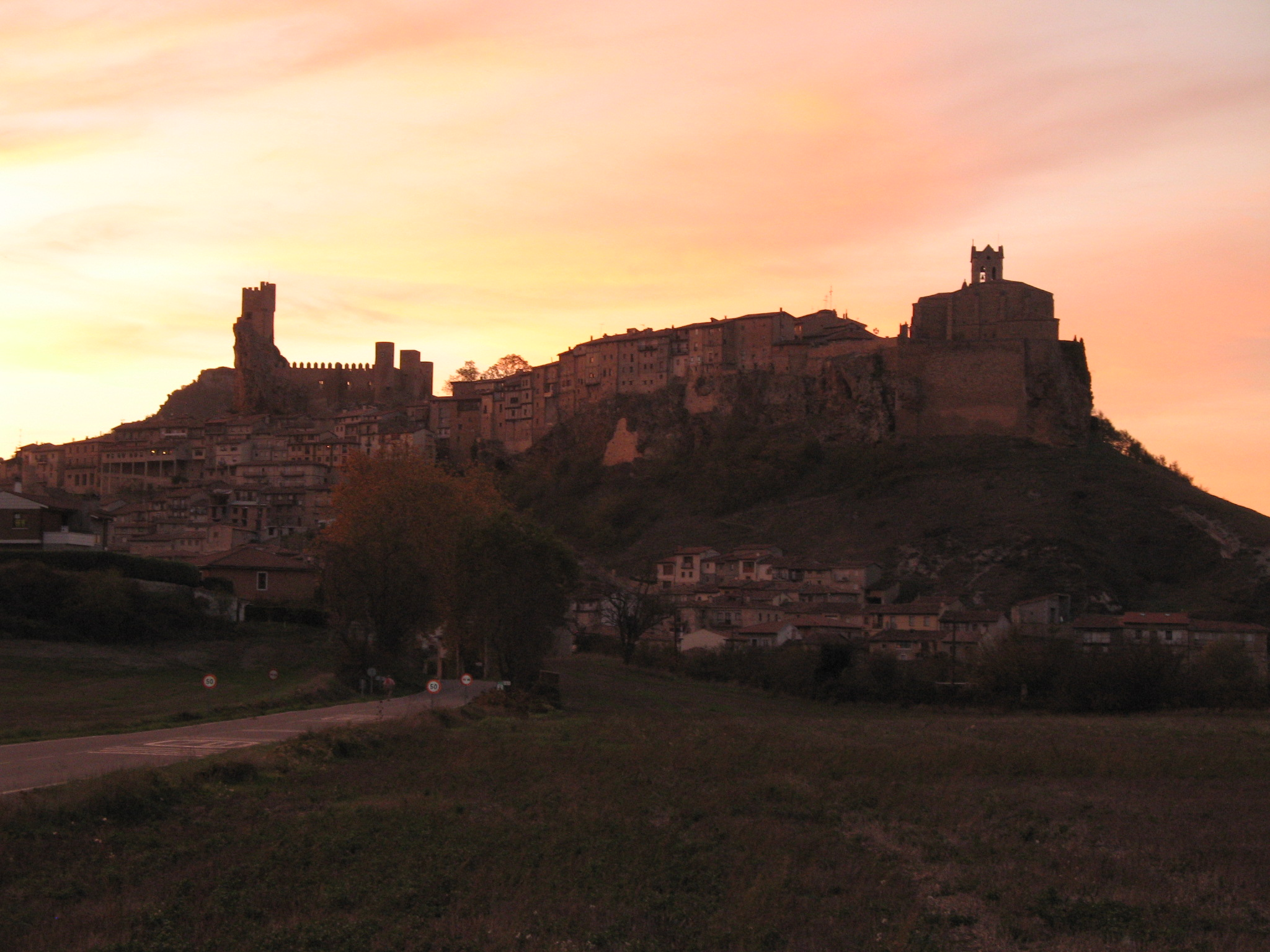
Frías at dawn

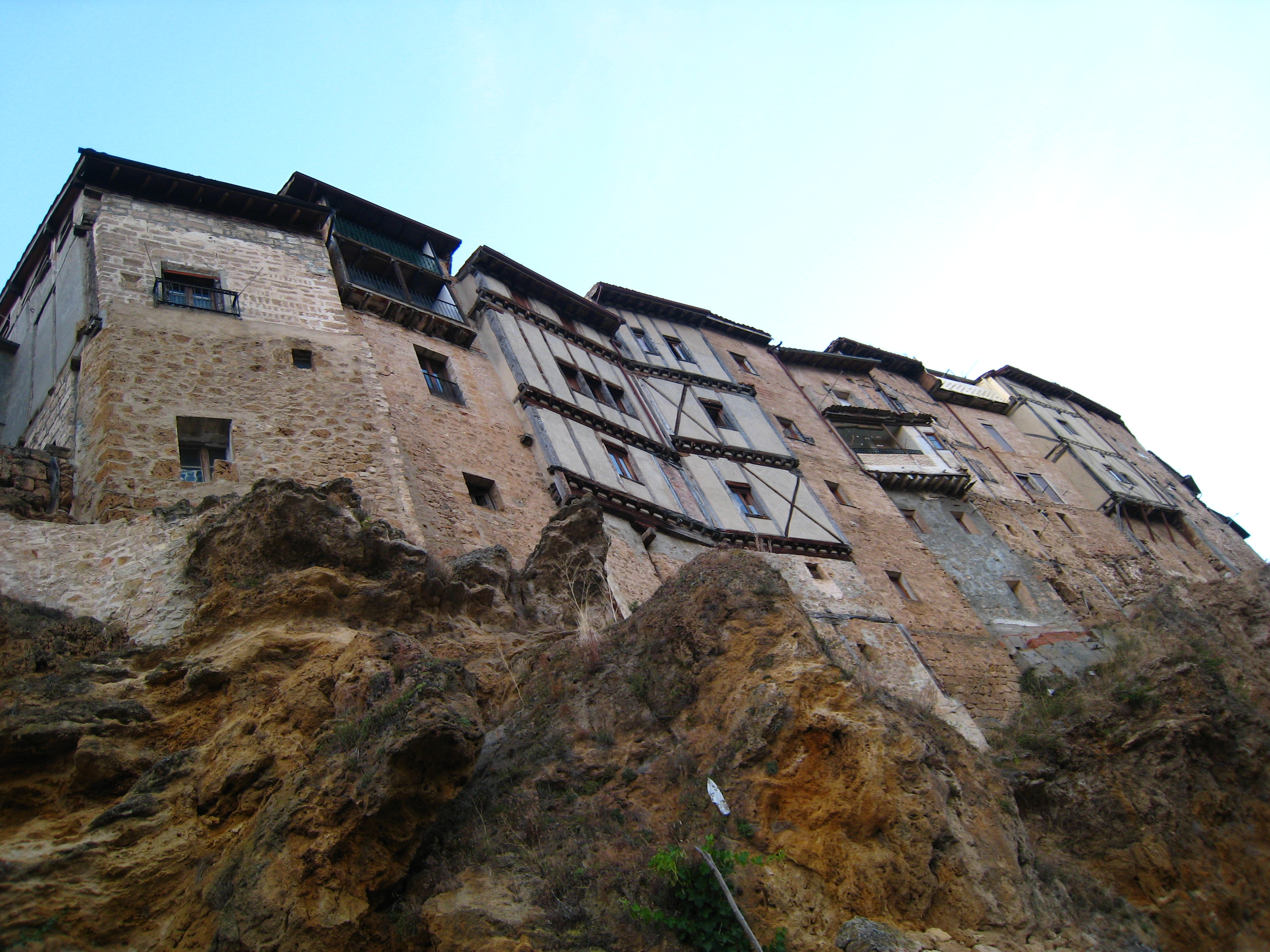
Hanging houses

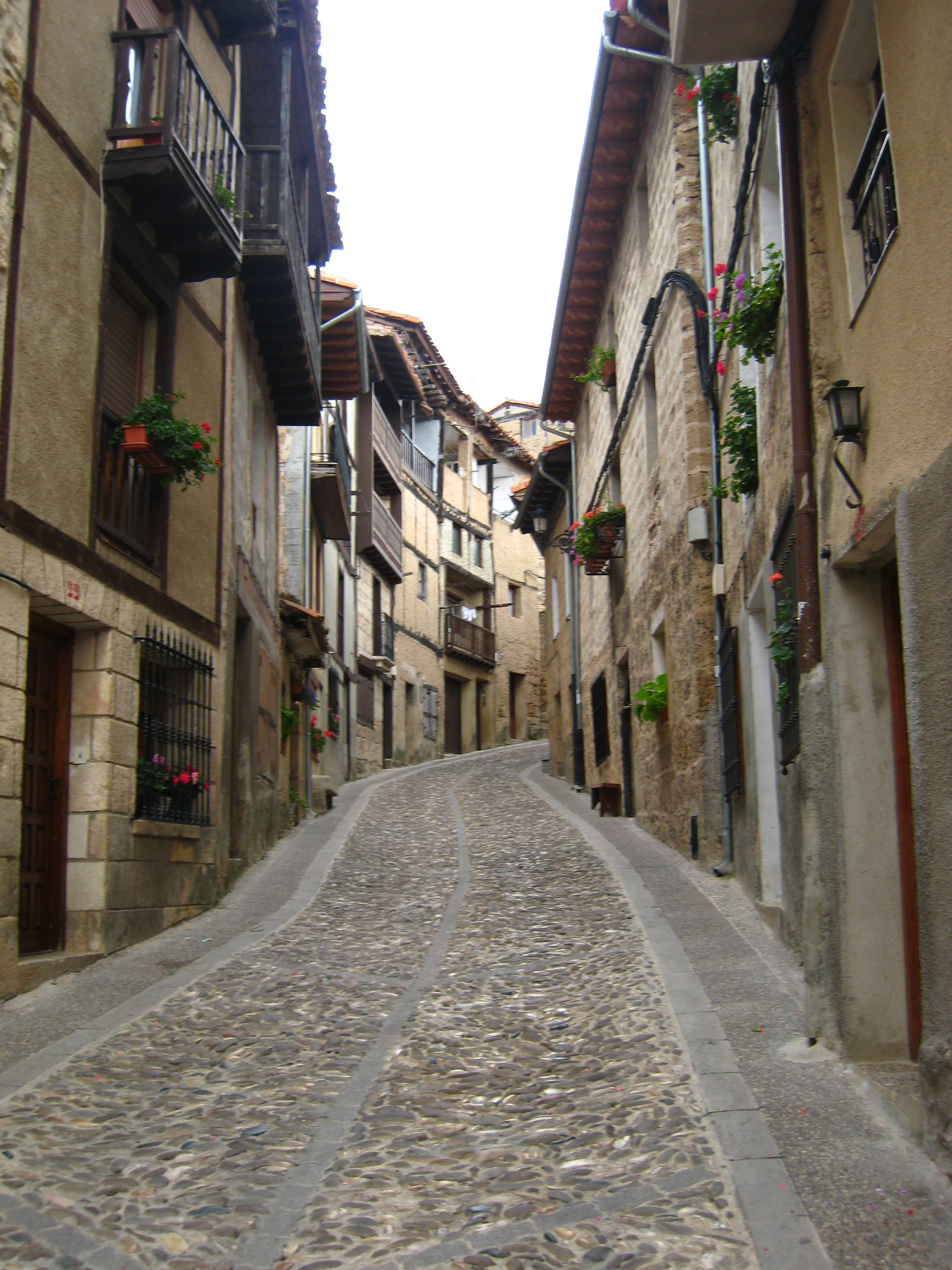
Street in Frías

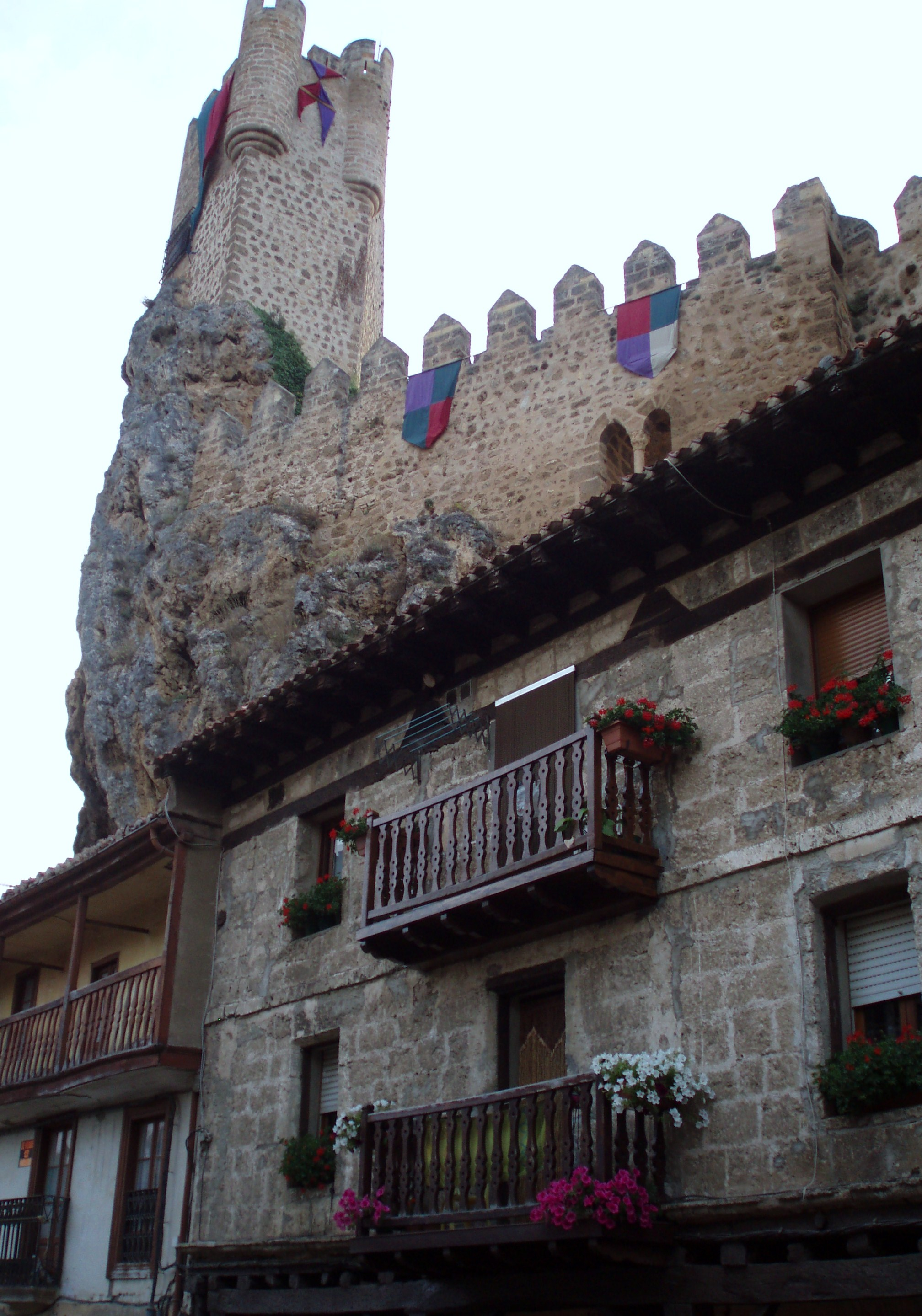
Frías castle (12th-15th century)

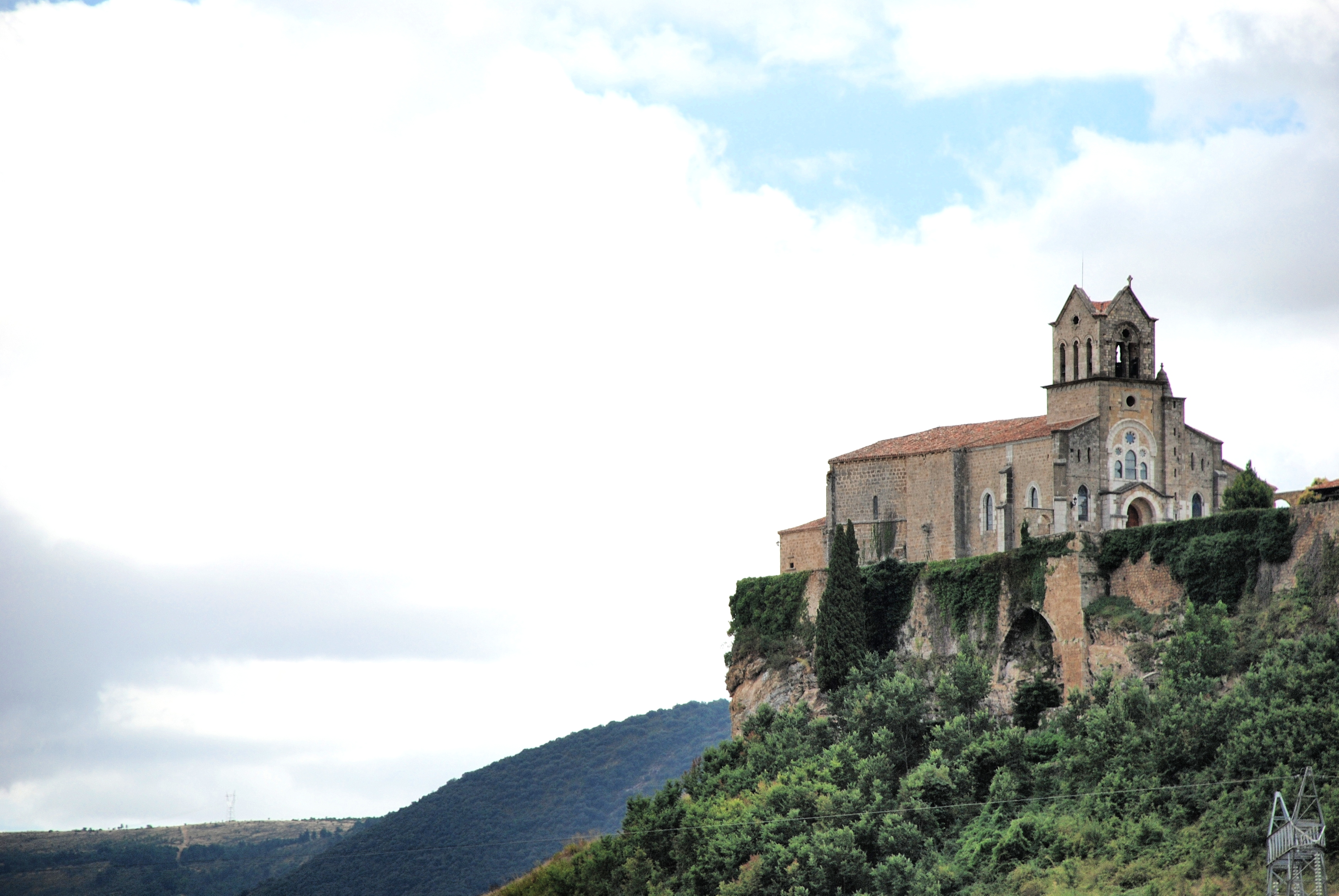
San Vicente Mártir y San Sebastián church

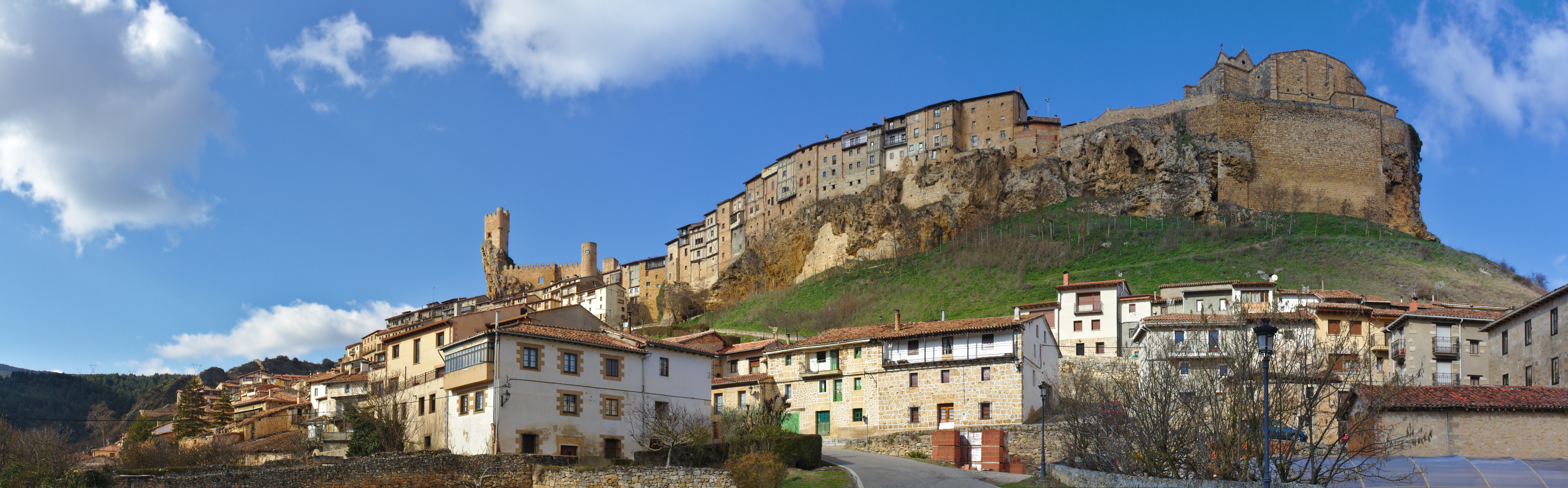
Panoramic view of Frías
