= Felipe Bigarny =

Spanish sculptor (1475–1542)

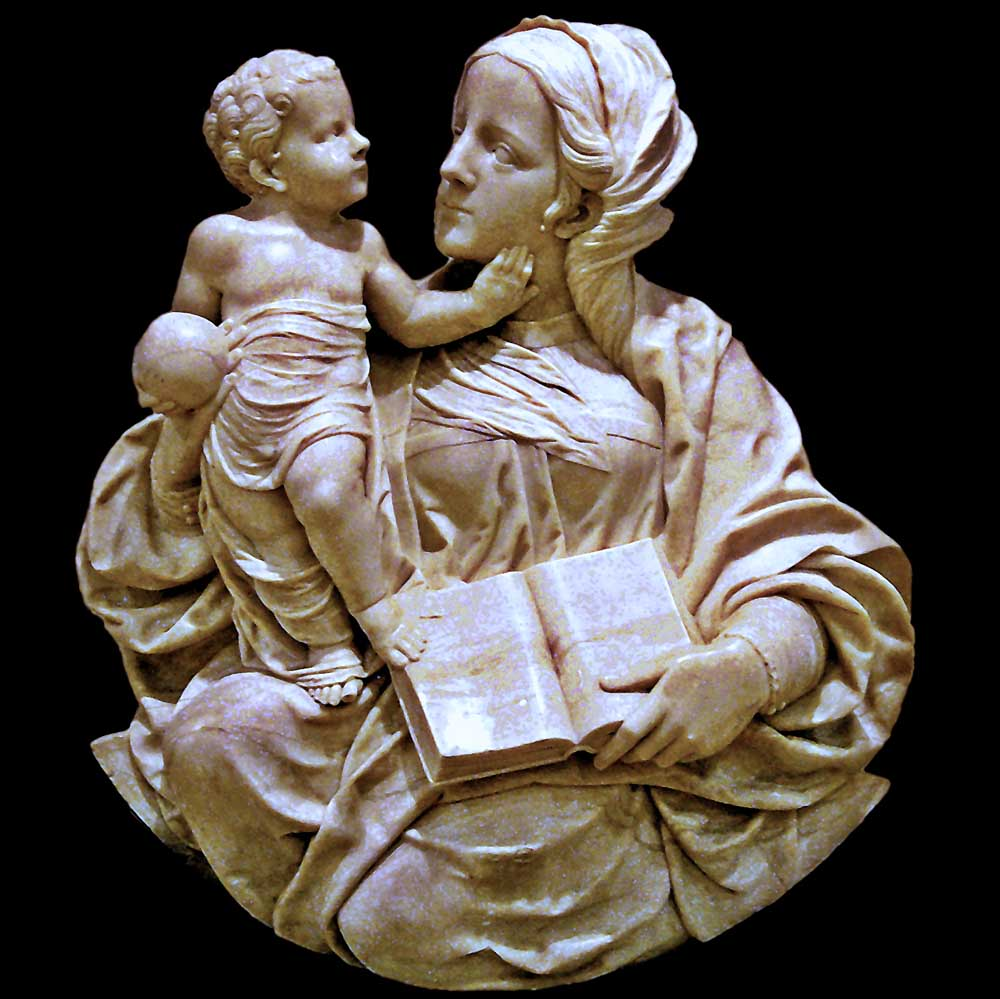
Virgin and Child attributed to Felipe Bigarny (National Museum of Sculpture, Valladolid).

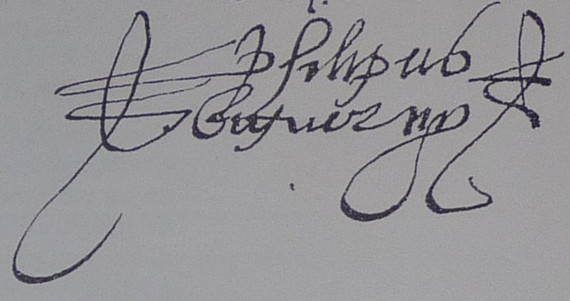
A signature with an italianized form of his name, Philipus Biguerny.

Felipe Bigarny (c. 1475 – 10 November 1542), also known as Felipe Vigarny, Felipe Biguerny or Felipe de Borgoña, etc. and sometimes referred to as El Borgoñón (the Burgundian), was a sculptor born in Burgundy (France) but who made his career in Spain and was one of the leading sculptors of the Spanish Renaissance. He was also an architect.

His work shows Flemish, Burgundian, and Italian Renaissance influences. He gained great prestige working in various parts of Spain which led to his becoming the master sculptor and carver of the Burgos Cathedral. He also played a role in creating many important works for the Crown of Castile, simultaneously operating several studios, and thus became quite wealthy.

== Biography ==
=== Youth ===
Born in Langres, Burgundy around 1475, Bigarny arrived in Italy as a youth and appears to have studied in Rome. As a result, Italian Renaissance influences can be found even in his early Gothic sculptural work.

=== Life in Spain ===
In 1498, at about the age of 23, he traveled the pilgrim route to Santiago, staying on in Burgos. There he executed the technically precise reliefs of the main retrochoir of the cathedral, which led to further contracts and a lifelong career in Spain. He would end up working in every sculptural genre of the time, executing both sculptures and decoration, and working in both stone and wood.

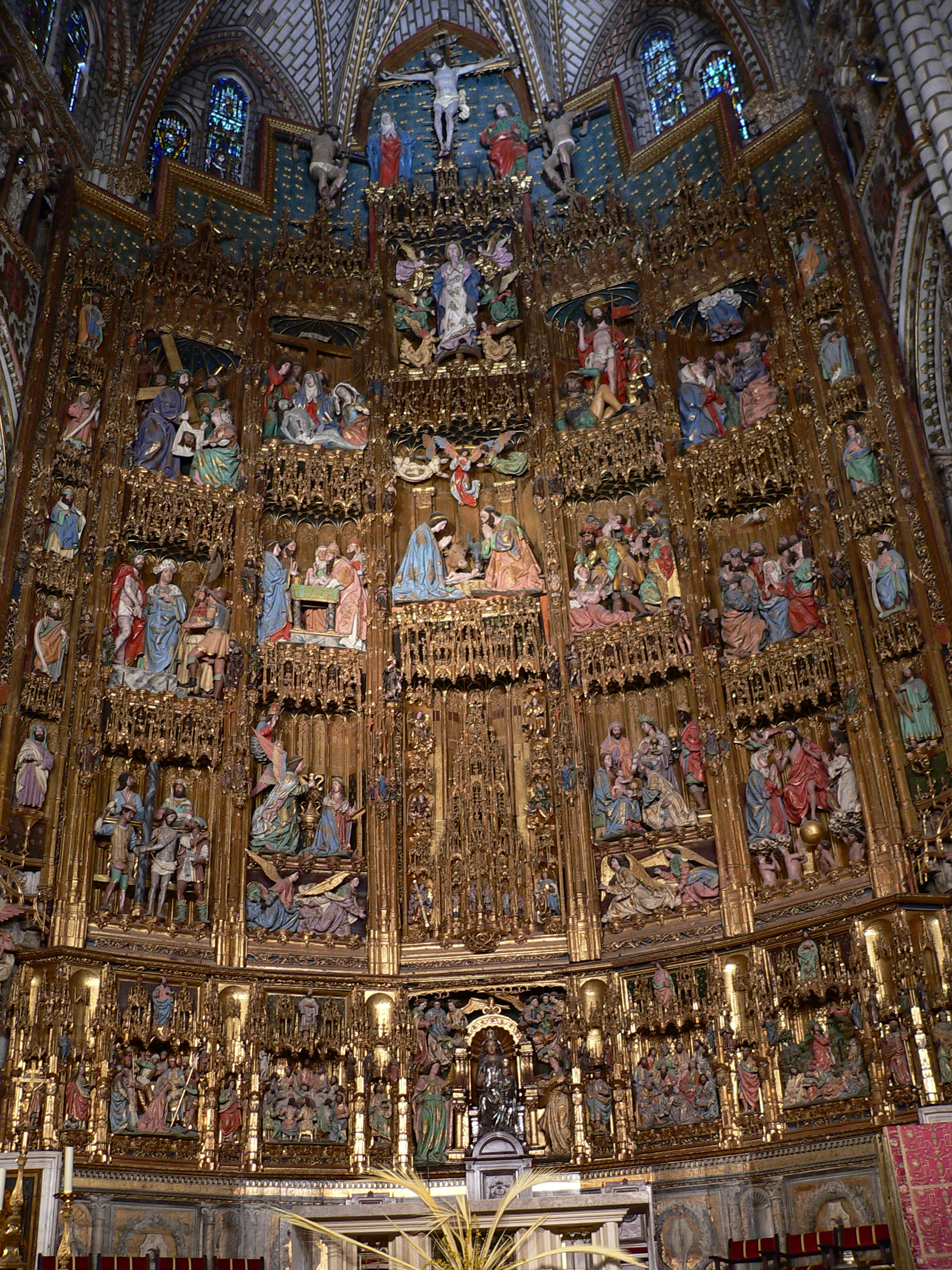
Main altarpiece of the Toledo Cathedral.

In 1499 Bigarny designed the basic structure of the main altarpiece of the Toledo Cathedral, for which he was contracted by Cardinal Archbishop Francisco Jiménez de Cisneros. He also prepared a figure of Saint Mark the Evangelist and agreed to sculpt several reliefs for the altarpiece, which he did between that time and 1504. In those same years, he also made sculptures of Saints Augustine, Barbara, Gregory, Jerome, John the Baptist and of the Assumption for the altarpiece of the University of Salamanca. He next began plans for the chapel of the Sanctuary of the Palencia Cathedral, making it clear that although most of the work would be done by others in his studio, he personally would sculpt the faces and hands. On 12 December 1506, Bigarny delivered seventeen sculptures (among them a polychromed Saint Antoninus of Pamiers, the titular saint of the cathedral) and on 19 October 1509 he delivered the remaining nine figures. These were brought together on the main altarpiece of that cathedral. In 1509 he returned to Burgos to work with Andrés de Nájera on the choir stalls of the Burgos Cathedral, a project completed in 1512. The panels of the top row of side chairs are attributed to him and his workshop.

In 1513 he designed the baldachin of the tomb of Dominic de la Calzada for the Cathedral of Santo Domingo de la Calzada (in Santo Domingo de la Calzada, La Rioja, Spain); his design was executed by Juan de Rasines.

In 1516 he began work on the main entrance and main altarpiece of the Church of Saint Thomas in Haro, La Rioja, completed in 1519. That year he also lived for a time in Casalarreina, La Rioja, where he may have collaborated in the construction of the La Piedad Monastery, although there is no documentary evidence for this.

In this same period he executed a profile relief of Cardenal Cisneros, which can now be seen in the Complutense University of Madrid. There is also documentary evidence of a similar relief of Antonio de Nebrija.

Bigarny married María Sáez Pardo, a widow with sons who had emigrated to the Americas; they had five further children. The first of these, Gregorio Pardo, born 1517, was the only one to follow in his father's career, collaborating with him toward the end of his life and continuing Bigarny's studio in the Archdiocese of Toledo. His influence extended to much sculpture in Burgos and throughout Castile in the first third of the 16th century and was even stronger at mid-century, until the rise of Romanism.

In 1519 he collaborated with Alonso Berruguete on the tomb of Cardinal Juan Selvagio in Zaragoza; the pair probably continued a collaboration on the Royal Chapel of Granada, which Bigarny appears to have helped design in 1521, but he was not actively involved in the construction.

==== Collaboration with Diego de Siloé ====
Upon returning to Burgos he began a collaboration with the Burgalese Diego de Siloé, who had returned in 1519 after studying in Italy. Bigarny and Diego de Siloé had a strong rivalry, although the latter was always ascendant. In 1523 the two executed the Saint Peter altarpiece in the Capilla de los Condestable ("Chapel of the Constables", referring to the title of Constable of Castile) of the Burgos Cathedral. In that same chapel, between 1523 and 1526 they created, for the main altarpiece, the figures of the Presentation of Jesus at the Temple, considered one of the most beautiful works of the Spanish Renaissance. No later than 1534, Bigarny had also executed the recumbent sculptures in the chapel of Pedro Fernández de Velasco, 2nd Count of Haro and his wife.

Aware of his fame and prestige in the city, Bigarny took permanent residence in Burgos, first in a building in the San Juan neighborhood and then in a distinguished house next to the Casa de la Moneda. In 1524 he contracted for work on the tomb of the canon Gonzalo Díez de Lerma, also in the Burgos Cathedral, in the Capilla de la Presentación ("Chapel of the Presentation"). This very expressive sculpture shows influences from Diego de Siloé.

Although there is no documentary evidence, he is believed in these years to have completed the altarpiece of Santiago de la Puebla (province of Salamanca) and the sculptures of the Virgen de la Silla (the Virgin Mary with the Christ child and the young John the Baptist) and the Virgin and Child for the Church of the Assumption in El Barco de Ávila. This last, pictured at the beginning of this article, is now in the National Sculpture Museum in Valladolid. Artistic similarities suggest that the tomb of canon Diego Bilbao and an altarpiece in the parish of Cardeñuela Riopico are also by Bigarny.

In 1526 the book Medidas del Romano by Diego de Sagredo, one of the first Spanish-language books on architecture, praised Bigarny's sculpture, leading to commissions from various parts of Spain.

In 1527 he completed the altarpiece of the Descent or of the Pillar in the Toledo Cathedral, which he had probably begun in 1520. This work is also much influenced by Siloé, although soon thereafter their working relationship came to an end over differences about a contract to construct the tower of the Church of the Assumption of Our Lady in Santa María del Campo, which resulted in a successful lawsuit by Siloé against Bigarny.

==== Later years ====
In 1530 he provided an opinion on the work for the Salamanca Cathedral. Between 1531 and 1533 he sculpted the tomb of Bishop Alonso de Burgos for the chapel of the Colegio de San Gregorio in Valladolid (now the site of the National Museum of Sculpture). This tomb was much praised at the time, but is considered in retrospect not to be among his better works. In 1534 he sculpted the tomb of Pedro Manso, bishop of Osma, for the Monastery of San Salvador de Oña.

When his wife María died, he soon remarried in 1535 to Francisca Velasco.

In 1535 the chapter of the Toledo Cathedral solicited designs for the choir stall of the Cathedral from Bigarny, as well as from Diego de Siloe, Juan Picardo, and Alonso Berruguete. They ultimately contracted on 1 January 1539 with Bigarny and Berruguete to create thirty choir stalls each. Bigarny created those along the side of the Evangelist, and also on the Archbishop's side.

In 1536 he signed a contract stipulating that within the next two years he would produce two tombs, one for Diego de Avellaneda, Bishop of Tuy (in the Monastery of Saint Jerome in Espeja (province of Soria) and the other for his father (now conserved in Alcalá de Henares). However, in 1539 these had still not been built, because he had taken on other projects. These figures in the round were subcontracted to Enrique de Maestrique. They would be among the works left incomplete at the time of his death, and were finished by Juan de Gómez. The tomb of Diego de Avellaneda was bought by the Spanish state in 1932 for the National Sculpture Museum.

In 1541 he contracted to produce an altarpiece for the Hospital of Santa Cruz in Toledo (now a museum), but it was never executed. He died in 1542 leaving behind projected or incomplete works in Toledo (where Berruguete followed through his work), Peñaranda de Duero, Valpuesta, and Burgos. He had studios set up in all these places, each of which had trusted delegates who were in charge in his absence. Among these were Maese Enrique, Sebastián de Salinas, Juan de Goyaz, his son Gregorio Pardo, and most importantly Diego Guillén, who was married to one of Bigarny's sisters-in-law.

=== Descendants ===
With María Sáez Pardo he had five children, including sculptor Gregorio Pardo and Clara, known in Burgos for her beauty and dubbed "la niña de plata" ("the silver girl"). With Francisca Velasco he had another five children.

== Works ==
The largest number of Bigarny's works are in Burgos, where he lived a long portion of his life, and in Toledo, where he had his most prominent studio.

=== Sculptures ===
Bigarny worked primarily as a sculptor, and it was as a sculptor that he became most famous in his own lifetime.

==== Burgos Cathedral ====
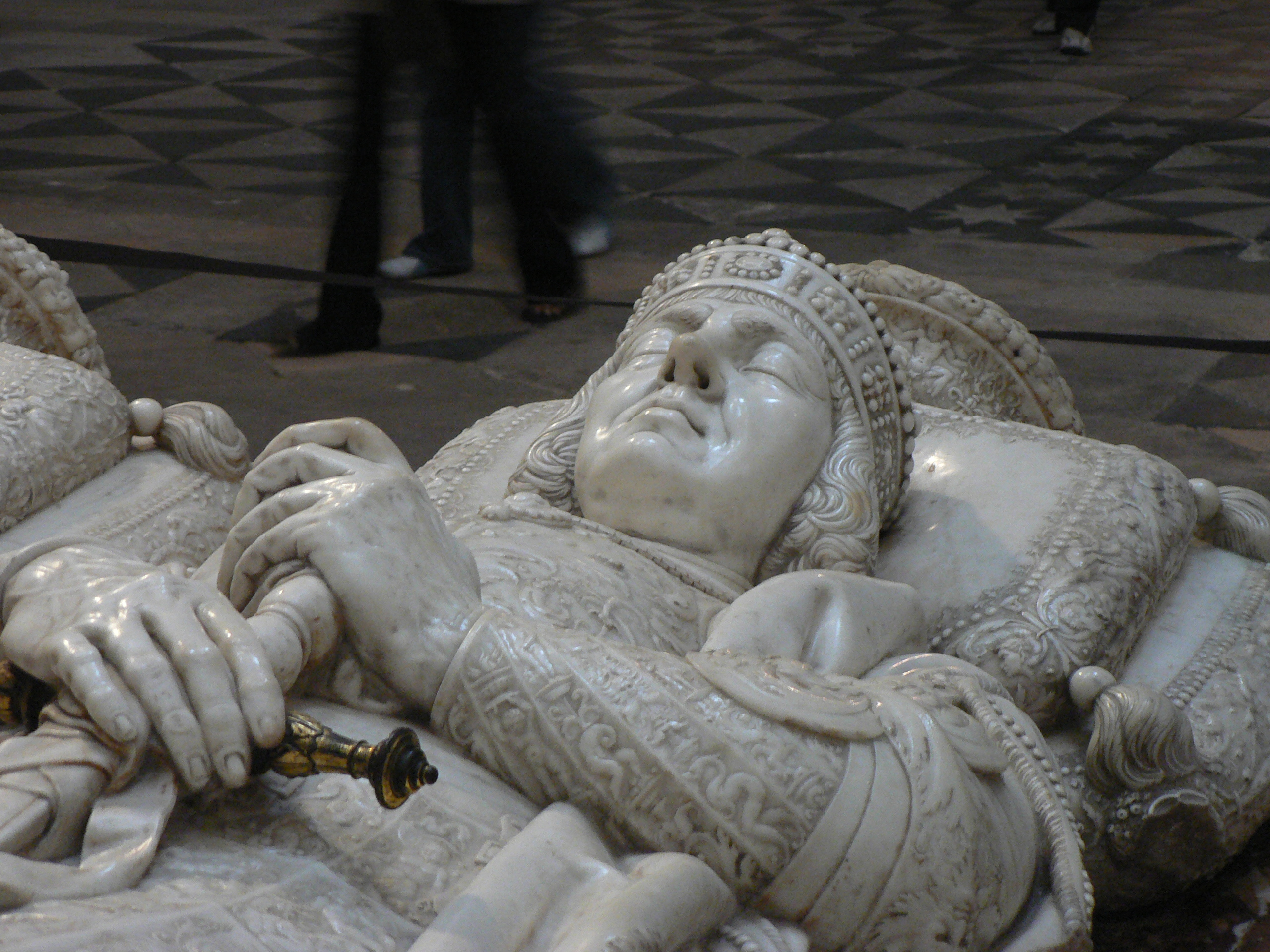
Detail of the tomb of Pedro Fernández de Velasco, Constable of Castile, in the Burgos Cathedral.

===== Relief of the Road to Calvary =====
Bagarny's first work in Burgos was a vast relief for the cathedral chapter, representing the Road to Calvary, which was used to decorate the central wall panel of the retrochoir of the Burgos Cathedral. He began this work in 1498 and finished in March 1499, meeting the deadline for which he had contracted, and receiving 200 ducats per the contract, plus another 30 ducats out of appreciation for the excellence of his work. The work had a great impact because it went beyond the Late Gothic style, and included the first example in Spain of Renaissance ornamentation in the pilasters of the gate of Jerusalem, which included classical motifs alluding to the labors of Hercules. This led to further commissions for sculptures in Burgos.

===== Two additional reliefs in the retrochoir =====
The chapter next commissioned two high reliefs for two other panels of the retrochoir. The first represented the Crucifixion; the second the Descent from the Cross and the Resurrection of Jesus. Both were completed in 1503.

The three reliefs show Bigarny's early style, largely influenced by the Late Gothic style of Northern Europe. The figures are of noble bearing, the attitudes and gestures are dramatic, the expression forceful and moving. There were also Renaissance elements such as movement and the diagonal composition of the first panel. The poor quality of the stone for the sculptures of the Burgos Cathedral has resulted in grave damage over the years, though more in the Apostles executed by Simón de Colonia and his studio than in Bigarny's work.

===== Chapel of the Constables =====
Together with Diego de Siloé, Bigarny constructed the altarpiece of the Chapel of the Constables of Castile. The recumbent sculptures of Constable Pedro Fernández de Velasco and his wife Mencía de Mendoza y Figueroa are sculpted from Carrara marble.

===== Other contributions =====
Along with Andrés de Nájera and possibly Guillén de Holanda, Bigarny designed and executed the reliefs for the choir stalls of the Burgos Cathedral (1505–1512), using motifs from the Old and New Testaments and the lives of Christian saints. Bigarny designed and executed the alabaster tomb of the canon Gonzalo de Lerma in the Chapel of the Presentation (1524).

=== Other works ===
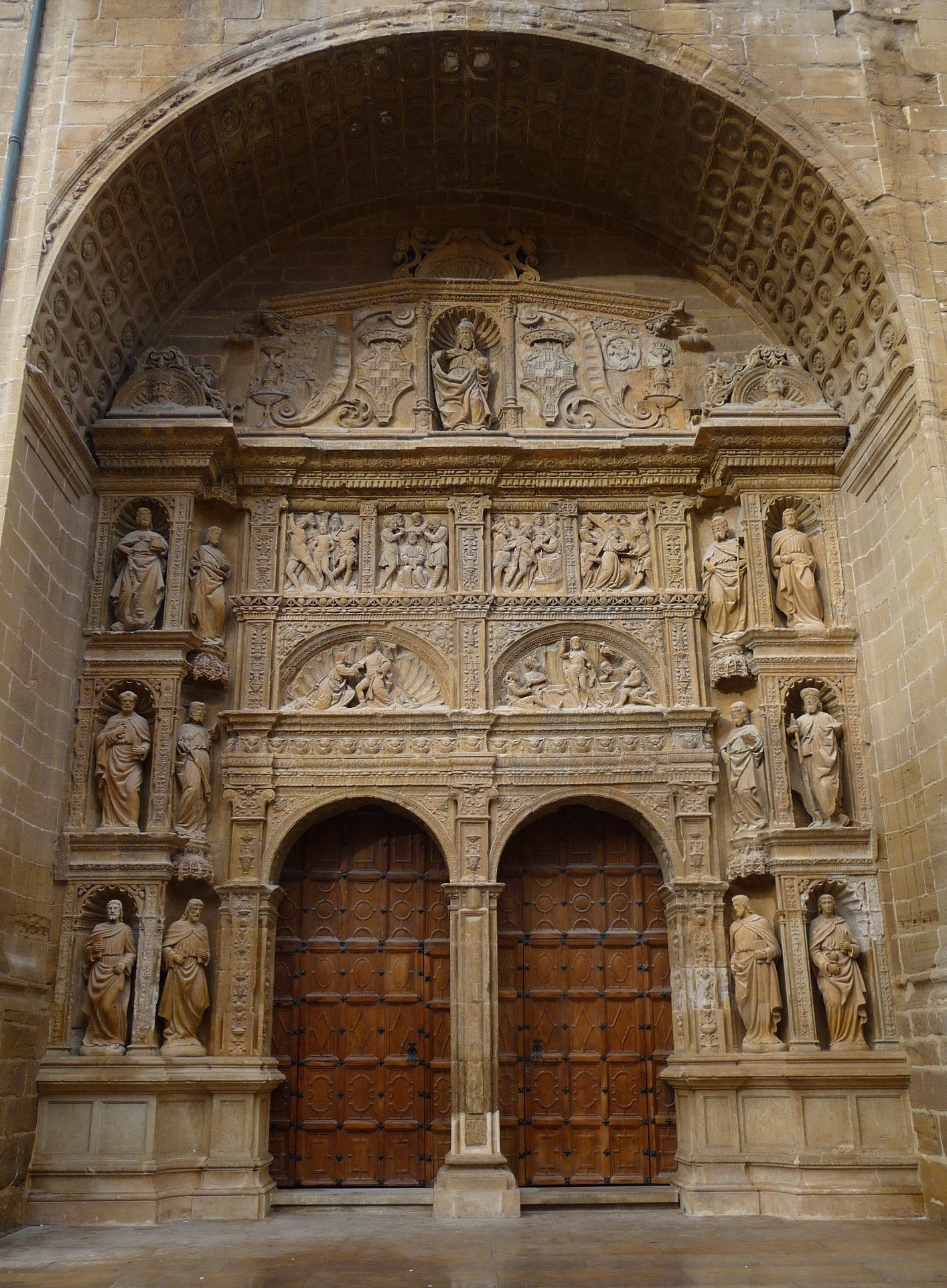
Principal entrance of the Church of Saint Thomas in Haro, in the Plateresque style.

- The main altarpiece of the Cathedral of Toledo (1500–1503). Executed in collaboration with Diego Copín de Holanda. The Gothic style of this sculptural and architectural assemblage contrasts with the Renaissance style of the Descent From the Cross in the same cathedral.
- Altarpiece of the University of Salamanca (1503).
- Sculpture of the altarpiece of the main chapel of Palencia Cathedral (1505–1507). Bigarny is believed to have had relatively little involvement in this work of his studio; only the faces are his own work.
- For Cardinal Cisneros in Alcalá de Henares (1512).
- Altarpiece for the Chapel of the Kings in the Church of San Gil Abad (early 16th century). Bot the architecture and the sculpture mix Late Gothic tradition with some Renaissance elements. It was inspired by the Capilla de la Buena Mañana ("Chapel of the Good Morning") in the same parish.
- Altarpiece for the Cathedral of Alcalá de Henares and two altarpieces for Torrelaguna (a municipality that is now part of Madrid, early 16th century). Commissioned by Cardinal Cisneros and executed together with León Picardo.
- Altarpiece for Don Gutierre de Mier and for the church of Cervera de Pisuerga (province of Palencia, 1513).
- Altarpiece of the devotion to Saint Bartholomew (1514). This was for the altar of the confraternity of Saint Bartholomew, in the Church of Saint Stephen in Burgos. León Picardo is believed to have undertaken the painting of the interior of the church. He worked continually with Bigarny. The piece is now in the Church of San Lesmes (Saint Aleaunie) in Burgos. It consists of statue of Saint Bartholomew, a series of painted panels and a Plateresque architectural assemblage.
- Entrance and main altarpiece of the Church of Saint Thomas in Haro, La Rioja (1516–1519). Both of these were built in cooperation with Íñigo Fernández de Velasco. The altarpiece was destroyed by the collapse of part of the building during construction.
- Tomb of Cardinal Juan Selvagio, Zaragoza (1519), in collaboration with Alonso Berruguete.
- Main altarpiece of the Royal Chapel of Granada, constructed in honor of the Catholic Monarchs Ferdinand and Isabella. He was involved in this work in 1521 and although he was not the primary designer, he played a fundamental role in the design of the assemblage, on which Alonso Berruguete and Jacopo Torni also worked.
- Altarpiece of the Descent or of the Pilar in the Cathedral of Toledo (1520–1527).
- Part of the choir stalls of the Cathedral of Toledo (1539–1542).
- Sculptures for the palace of Peñaranda de Duero.

==== Attributions for which there are doubts ====
Although Bigarny has been traditionally attributed the decoration of the Monastery of Nuestra Señora de la Piedad in Casalarreina and it is known that he resided in Casalarreina in 1519 there is no documentary evidence that he or his carver Matías worked on that church. José Martí y Monsó in a study on the art and architecture of Haro and Casalarreina argued against the likelihood of Bigarny or his studio having worked on the monastery, and present-day specialists generally agree with that verdict.

=== Architecture ===
Although primarily a sculptor, Bigarny was also an architect; he did not meet with comparable success gaining commissions in that field. It is believed that he submitted designs for the crossing lantern (cimborrio) of the Cathedral of Burgos and the Arch of Santa María, also in Burgos. He proposed a design for the tower of the Church of the Assumption of Our Lady in Santa María del Campo, but it was not the one selected.
