= 2024 Vuelta a Burgos =

Men's road cycling stage race

2024 UCI ProSeries

Race details
- Dates: 5–9 August 2024
- Stages: 5
- Distance: 641.5 km (398.6 mi)
- Winning time: 15h 09' 06"

Results
Jersey awarded to the overall winner	Winner	Sepp Kuss (USA)	(Visma–Lease a Bike)
	Second	Max Poole (GBR)	(Team DSM–Firmenich PostNL)
	Third	Finn Fisher-Black (NZL)	(UAE Team Emirates)
Jersey awarded to the points classification winner	Points	Pavel Bittner (CZE)	(Team DSM–Firmenich PostNL)
Jersey awarded to the mountains classification winner	Mountains	Diego Pablo Sevilla (ESP)	(Polti–Kometa)
Jersey awarded to the youth classification winner	Youth	Max Poole (GBR)	(Team DSM–Firmenich PostNL)
	Team	(Netherlands) Visma–Lease a Bike	

The 2024 Vuelta a Burgos was a men's road cycling stage race that took place from 5 to 9 August 2024 in the Spanish province of Burgos. It was the 46th edition of the Vuelta a Burgos, and was rated as a 2.Pro event as part of the 2024 UCI ProSeries calendar.

== Teams ==
Fourteen of the eighteen UCI WorldTeams were joined by seven UCI ProTeams to make up the twenty-one teams that participated in the race.

UCI WorldTeams

- Astana Qazaqstan Team
- Decathlon–AG2R La Mondiale
- EF Education–EasyPost
- Groupama–FDJ
- Ineos Grenadiers
- Intermarché–Wanty
- Lidl–Trek
- Movistar Team
- Red Bull–Bora–Hansgrohe
- Team Bahrain Victorious
- Team DSM–Firmenich PostNL
- Team Jayco–AlUla
- UAE Team Emirates
- Visma–Lease a Bike

UCI ProTeams

- Burgos BH
- Caja Rural–Seguros RGA
- Equipo Kern Pharma
- Euskaltel–Euskadi
- Polti–Kometa
- Tudor Pro Cycling Team
- Q36.5 Pro Cycling Team

== Route ==
Stage characteristics and winners
Stage	Date	Course	Distance	Type	Stage winner
1	5 August	Vilviestre del Pinar to Burgos	168 km (104 mi)	Hilly stage	Pavel Bittner (CZE)
2	6 August	Valle de Mena to Ojo Guareña	161 km (100 mi)	Medium-mountain stage	Caleb Ewan (AUS)
3	7 August	Gumiel de Izán to Lagunas de Neila	138 km (86 mi)	Mountain stage	Sepp Kuss (USA)
4	8 August	Santa María del Campo to Pampliega	18.5 km (11.5 mi)	Individual time trial	Jay Vine (AUS)
5	9 August	Frías to Condado de Treviño	156 km (97 mi)	Hilly stage	Pavel Bittner (CZE)
Total			641.5 km (398.6 mi)		

== Stages ==
=== Stage 1 ===
5 August 2024 – Vilviestre del Pinar to Burgos, 168 km (104 mi)

Stage 1 Result
Rank	Rider	Team	Time
1	Pavel Bittner (CZE)	Team DSM–Firmenich PostNL	4h 02' 26"
2	Giacomo Nizzolo (ITA)	Q36.5 Pro Cycling Team	+ 0"
3	Iván García Cortina (ESP)	Movistar Team	+ 0"
4	Edoardo Affini (ITA)	Visma–Lease a Bike	+ 0"
5	Ivo Oliveira (POR)	UAE Team Emirates	+ 0"
6	Ide Schelling (NED)	Astana Qazaqstan Team	+ 0"
7	Marius Mayrhofer (GER)	Tudor Pro Cycling Team	+ 0"
8	Kim Heiduk (GER)	Ineos Grenadiers	+ 0"
9	Caleb Ewan (AUS)	Team Jayco–AlUla	+ 0"
10	Sander De Pestel (BEL)	Decathlon–AG2R La Mondiale	+ 0"

General classification after Stage 1
Rank	Rider	Team	Time
1	Pavel Bittner (CZE)	Team DSM–Firmenich PostNL	4h 02' 16"
2	Giacomo Nizzolo (ITA)	Q36.5 Pro Cycling Team	+ 4"
3	Iván García Cortina (ESP)	Movistar Team	+ 6"
4	Max Poole (GBR)	Team DSM–Firmenich PostNL	+ 7"
5	Ben Tulett (GBR)	Visma–Lease a Bike	+ 9"
6	Edoardo Affini (ITA)	Visma–Lease a Bike	+ 10"
7	Ivo Oliveira (POR)	UAE Team Emirates	+ 10"
8	Ide Schelling (NED)	Astana Qazaqstan Team	+ 10"
9	Marius Mayrhofer (GER)	Tudor Pro Cycling Team	+ 10"
10	Kim Heiduk (GER)	Ineos Grenadiers	+ 10"

=== Stage 2 ===
6 August 2024 – Valle de Mena to Ojo Guareña, 161 km (100 mi)

Stage 2 Result
Rank	Rider	Team	Time
1	Caleb Ewan (AUS)	Team Jayco–AlUla	3h 59' 43"
2	Roger Adrià (ESP)	Red Bull–Bora–Hansgrohe	+ 0"
3	Iván García Cortina (ESP)	Movistar Team	+ 0"
4	Rémy Rochas (FRA)	Groupama–FDJ	+ 0"
5	Quinn Simmons (USA)	Lidl–Trek	+ 0"
6	Antonio Angulo (ESP)	Burgos BH	+ 0"
7	Jon Aberasturi (ESP)	Euskaltel–Euskadi	+ 0"
8	Patrick Konrad (AUT)	Lidl–Trek	+ 0"
9	Pavel Bittner (CZE)	Team DSM–Firmenich PostNL	+ 0"
10	Nicolò Parisini (ITA)	Q36.5 Pro Cycling Team	+ 0"

General classification after Stage 2
Rank	Rider	Team	Time
1	Caleb Ewan (AUS)	Team Jayco–AlUla	8h 01' 59"
2	Pavel Bittner (CZE)	Team DSM–Firmenich PostNL	+ 0"
3	Iván García Cortina (ESP)	Movistar Team	+ 2"
4	Roger Adrià (ESP)	Red Bull–Bora–Hansgrohe	+ 4"
5	Max Poole (GBR)	Team DSM–Firmenich PostNL	+ 7"
6	Antonio Angulo (ESP)	Burgos BH	+ 10"
7	Matevž Govekar (SLO)	Team Bahrain Victorious	+ 10"
8	Marc Brustenga (ESP)	Equipo Kern Pharma	+ 10"
9	Rémy Rochas (FRA)	Groupama–FDJ	+ 10"
10	Quinn Simmons (USA)	Lidl–Trek	+ 10"

=== Stage 3 ===
7 August 2024 – Gumiel de Izán to Lagunas de Neila, 138 km (86 mi)

Stage 3 Result
Rank	Rider	Team	Time
1	Sepp Kuss (USA)	Visma–Lease a Bike	3h 22' 05"
2	Lorenzo Fortunato (ITA)	Astana Qazaqstan Team	+ 7"
3	Jefferson Alveiro Cepeda (ECU)	Caja Rural–Seguros RGA	+ 7"
4	Max Poole (GBR)	Team DSM–Firmenich PostNL	+ 20"
5	Javier Romo (ESP)	Movistar Team	+ 23"
6	Jefferson Alexander Cepeda (ECU)	EF Education–EasyPost	+ 26"
7	Pablo Castrillo (ESP)	Equipo Kern Pharma	+ 28"
8	Victor Lafay (FRA)	Decathlon–AG2R La Mondiale	+ 32"
9	Michael Storer (AUS)	Tudor Pro Cycling Team	+ 32"
10	Sergio Higuita (COL)	Red Bull–Bora–Hansgrohe	+ 34"

General classification after Stage 3
Rank	Rider	Team	Time
1	Sepp Kuss (USA)	Visma–Lease a Bike	11h 24' 04"
2	Jefferson Alveiro Cepeda (ECU)	Caja Rural–Seguros RGA	+ 13"
3	Max Poole (GBR)	Team DSM–Firmenich PostNL	+ 27"
4	Lorenzo Fortunato (ITA)	Astana Qazaqstan Team	+ 30"
5	Jefferson Alexander Cepeda (ECU)	EF Education–EasyPost	+ 36"
6	Pablo Castrillo (ESP)	Equipo Kern Pharma	+ 38"
7	Victor Lafay (FRA)	Decathlon–AG2R La Mondiale	+ 42"
8	Michael Storer (AUS)	Tudor Pro Cycling Team	+ 42"
9	Cian Uijtdebroeks (BEL)	Visma–Lease a Bike	+ 44"
10	Davide Piganzoli (ITA)	Polti–Kometa	+ 44"

=== Stage 4 ===
8 August 2024 – Santa María del Campo to Pampliega, 18.5 km (11.5 mi) (ITT)

Stage 4 Result
Rank	Rider	Team	Time
1	Jay Vine (AUS)	UAE Team Emirates	19' 51"
2	Edoardo Affini (ITA)	Visma–Lease a Bike	+ 11"
3	Antonio Tiberi (ITA)	Team Bahrain Victorious	+ 12"
4	Finn Fisher-Black (NZL)	UAE Team Emirates	+ 16"
5	Brandon Rivera (COL)	Ineos Grenadiers	+ 17"
6	Thymen Arensman (NED)	Ineos Grenadiers	+ 20"
7	Iván Romeo (ESP)	Movistar Team	+ 21"
8	Max Poole (GBR)	Team DSM–Firmenich PostNL	+ 21"
9	Txomin Juaristi (ESP)	Euskaltel–Euskadi	+ 26"
10	David de la Cruz (ESP)	Q36.5 Pro Cycling Team	+ 38"

General classification after Stage 4
Rank	Rider	Team	Time
1	Sepp Kuss (USA)	Visma–Lease a Bike	11h 44' 38"
2	Max Poole (GBR)	Team DSM–Firmenich PostNL	+ 5"
3	Finn Fisher-Black (NZL)	UAE Team Emirates	+ 34"
4	Urko Berrade (ESP)	Equipo Kern Pharma	+ 41"
5	Michael Storer (AUS)	Tudor Pro Cycling Team	+ 42"
6	Jefferson Alveiro Cepeda (ECU)	Caja Rural–Seguros RGA	+ 53"
7	Pablo Castrillo (ESP)	Equipo Kern Pharma	+ 57"
8	Brandon Rivera (COL)	Ineos Grenadiers	+ 59"
9	Patrick Konrad (AUT)	Lidl–Trek	+ 1' 00"
10	Sergio Higuita (COL)	Red Bull–Bora–Hansgrohe	+ 1' 01"

=== Stage 5 ===
9 August 2024 – Frías to Condado de Treviño, 156 km (97 mi)

Stage 5 Result
Rank	Rider	Team	Time
1	Pavel Bittner (CZE)	Team DSM–Firmenich PostNL	3h 24' 28"
2	Nicolò Parisini (ITA)	Q36.5 Pro Cycling Team	+ 0"
3	Iván García Cortina (ESP)	Movistar Team	+ 0"
4	Jon Aberasturi (ESP)	Euskaltel–Euskadi	+ 0"
5	Matevž Govekar (SLO)	Team Bahrain Victorious	+ 0"
6	Marc Brustenga (ESP)	Equipo Kern Pharma	+ 0"
7	Roger Adrià (ESP)	Red Bull–Bora–Hansgrohe	+ 0"
8	Ivo Oliveira (POR)	UAE Team Emirates	+ 0"
9	Matthew Walls (GBR)	Groupama–FDJ	+ 0"
10	Antonio Angulo (ESP)	Burgos BH	+ 0"

General classification after Stage 5
Rank	Rider	Team	Time
1	Sepp Kuss (USA)	Visma–Lease a Bike	11h 44' 38"
2	Max Poole (GBR)	Team DSM–Firmenich PostNL	+ 5"
3	Finn Fisher-Black (NZL)	UAE Team Emirates	+ 34"
4	Urko Berrade (ESP)	Equipo Kern Pharma	+ 41"
5	Michael Storer (AUS)	Tudor Pro Cycling Team	+ 42"
6	Jefferson Alveiro Cepeda (ECU)	Caja Rural–Seguros RGA	+ 53"
7	Pablo Castrillo (ESP)	Equipo Kern Pharma	+ 57"
8	Brandon Rivera (COL)	Ineos Grenadiers	+ 59"
9	Patrick Konrad (AUT)	Lidl–Trek	+ 1' 00"
10	Sergio Higuita (COL)	Red Bull–Bora–Hansgrohe	+ 1' 01"

== Classification leadership table ==
Classification leadership by stage
Stage	Winner	General classification	Points classification	Mountains classification	Young rider classification	Team classification
1	Pavel Bittner	Pavel Bittner	Pavel Bittner	Diego Pablo Sevilla	Pavel Bittner	Movistar Team
2	Caleb Ewan	Caleb Ewan	Caleb Ewan	Diego Pablo Sevilla	Pavel Bittner	Lidl–Trek
3	Sepp Kuss	Sepp Kuss	Pavel Bittner	Diego Pablo Sevilla	Max Poole	Equipo Kern Pharma
4	Jay Vine	Sepp Kuss	Edoardo Affini	Diego Pablo Sevilla	Max Poole	Visma–Lease a Bike
5	Pavel Bittner	Sepp Kuss	Pavel Bittner	Diego Pablo Sevilla	Max Poole	Visma–Lease a Bike
Final		Sepp Kuss	Pavel Bittner	Diego Pablo Sevilla	Max Poole	Visma–Lease a Bike

== Classification standings ==
Legend
Denotes the winner of the general classification	Denotes the winner of the mountains classification
Denotes the winner of the points classification	Denotes the winner of the young rider classification

=== General classification ===
Final general classification (1–10)
Rank	Rider	Team	Time
1	Sepp Kuss (USA)	Visma–Lease a Bike	15h 09' 06"
2	Max Poole (GBR)	Team DSM–Firmenich PostNL	+ 5"
3	Finn Fisher-Black (NZL)	UAE Team Emirates	+ 34"
4	Urko Berrade (ESP)	Equipo Kern Pharma	+ 41"
5	Michael Storer (AUS)	Tudor Pro Cycling Team	+ 42"
6	Jefferson Alveiro Cepeda (ECU)	Caja Rural–Seguros RGA	+ 53"
7	Pablo Castrillo (ESP)	Equipo Kern Pharma	+ 57"
8	Brandon Rivera (COL)	Ineos Grenadiers	+ 59"
9	Patrick Konrad (AUT)	Lidl–Trek	+ 1' 00"
10	Sergio Higuita (COL)	Red Bull–Bora–Hansgrohe	+ 1' 01"

=== Points classification ===
Final points classification (1–10)
Rank	Rider	Team	Points
1	Pavel Bittner (CZE)	Team DSM–Firmenich PostNL	57
2	Iván García Cortina (ESP)	Movistar Team	48
3	Edoardo Affini (ITA)	Visma–Lease a Bike	35
4	Caleb Ewan (AUS)	Team Jayco–AlUla	32
5	Roger Adrià (ESP)	Red Bull–Bora–Hansgrohe	29
6	Sepp Kuss (USA)	Visma–Lease a Bike	27
7	Nicolò Parisini (ITA)	Q36.5 Pro Cycling Team	26
8	Jay Vine (AUS)	UAE Team Emirates	25
9	Jon Aberasturi (ESP)	Euskaltel–Euskadi	23
10	Max Poole (GBR)	Team DSM–Firmenich PostNL	22

=== Mountains classification ===
Final mountains classification (1–10)
Rank	Rider	Team	Points
1	Diego Pablo Sevilla (ESP)	Polti–Kometa	50
2	Sepp Kuss (USA)	Visma–Lease a Bike	32
3	Max Poole (GBR)	Team DSM–Firmenich PostNL	28
4	Jefferson Alveiro Cepeda (ECU)	Caja Rural–Seguros RGA	28
5	Gorka Sorarrain (ESP)	Caja Rural–Seguros RGA	27
6	Lorenzo Fortunato (ITA)	Astana Qazaqstan Team	25
7	Rodrigo Álvarez (ESP)	Burgos BH	17
8	Chris Hamilton (AUS)	Team DSM–Firmenich PostNL	16
9	Jefferson Alexander Cepeda (ECU)	EF Education–EasyPost	14
10	Mario Aparicio (ESP)	Burgos BH	13

=== Young rider classification ===
Final young rider classification (1–10)
Rank	Rider	Team	Time
1	Max Poole (GBR)	Team DSM–Firmenich PostNL	15h 09' 11"
2	Finn Fisher-Black (NZL)	UAE Team Emirates	+ 29"
3	Pablo Castrillo (ESP)	Equipo Kern Pharma	+ 52"
4	Davide Piganzoli (ITA)	Polti–Kometa	+ 1' 00"
5	Iván Romeo (ESP)	Movistar Team	+ 1' 02"
6	Javier Romo (ESP)	Movistar Team	+ 1' 11"
7	Darren Rafferty (IRL)	EF Education–EasyPost	+ 1' 18"
8	Thymen Arensman (NED)	Ineos Grenadiers	+ 1' 26"
9	Welay Berhe (ETH)	Team Jayco–AlUla	+ 1' 39"
10	Ibon Ruiz (ESP)	Equipo Kern Pharma	+ 1' 42"

=== Team classification ===
Final team classification (1–10)
Rank	Team	Time
1	(Netherlands) Visma–Lease a Bike	45h 30' 00"
2	(United Arab Emirates) UAE Team Emirates	+ 1"
3	(Spain) Equipo Kern Pharma	+ 29"
4	(United Kingdom) Ineos Grenadiers	+ 39"
5	(France) Decathlon–AG2R La Mondiale	+ 3' 49"
6	(Italy) Polti–Kometa	+ 3' 54"
7	(Germany) Red Bull–Bora–Hansgrohe	+ 4' 59"
8	(Spain) Euskaltel–Euskadi	+ 5' 51"
9	(Spain) Movistar Team	+ 6' 49"
10	(United States) EF Education–EasyPost	+ 6' 56"
