= Haro Wine Festival =

Festival in Haro, Spain

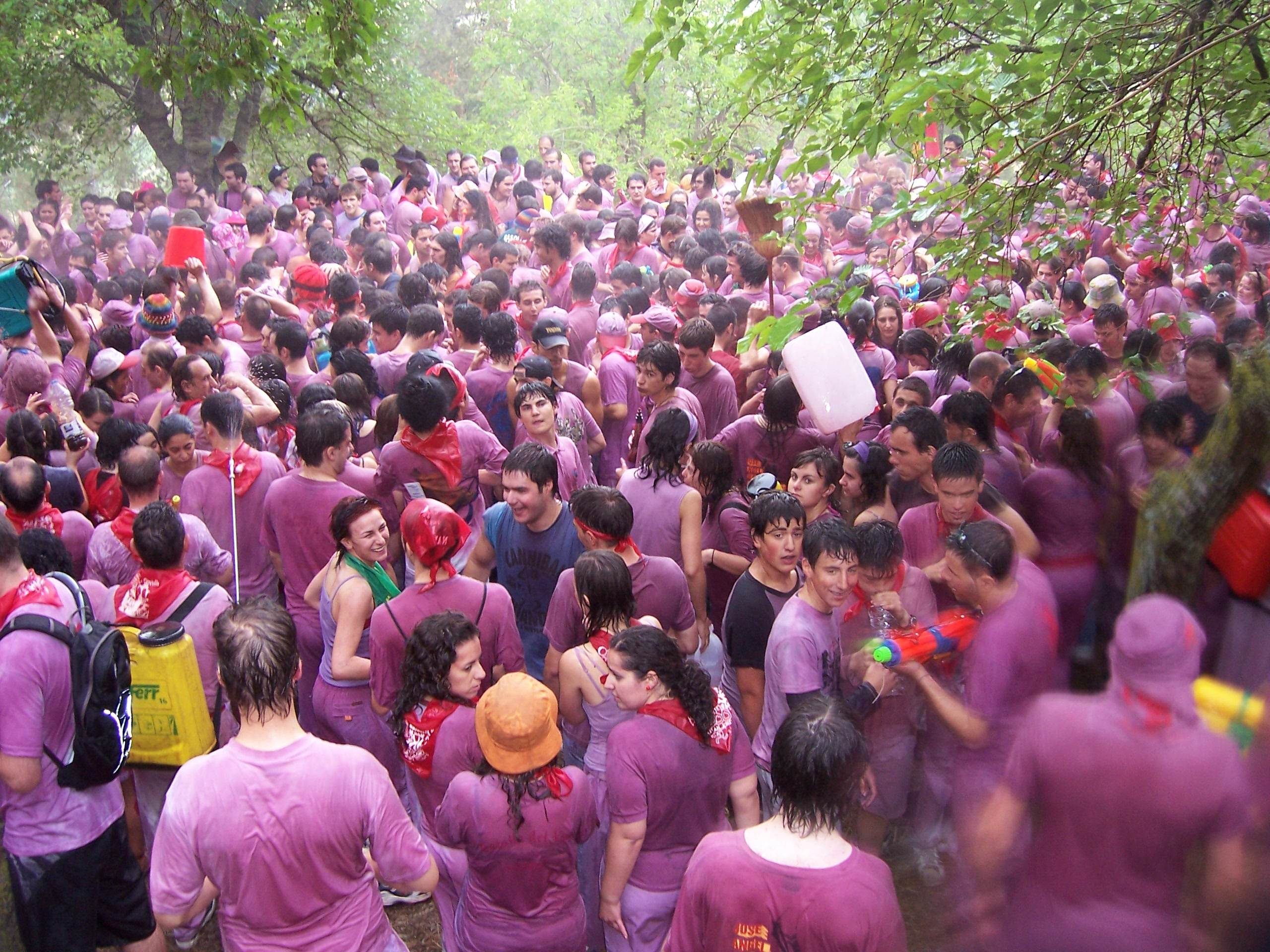
Haro Wine Festival

The Haro Wine Festival is a summer festival in the town of Haro, La Rioja, Spain. It features a Batalla de Vino (Battle of Wine) and youth bullfights. It is considered a "Festival of International Tourist Interest" and, therefore, is very tourist friendly. The festival takes place on June 29, the day of the patron saint San Pedro.

The festival includes a mass that is celebrated at the Chapel of San Felices de Bilibio. Saint Felix of Bilibio, master of San Millán in the 6th century, lived and died in what is now known as the Cliffs of Bilibio. Since then, this chapel has been visited and admired by pilgrims. The pilgrimage became a much more organized and widely-celebrated tradition since the construction of the first official chapel on the cliffs. This chapel was built at the beginning of the 18th century.

After the mass, the Battle of Wine begins. During lunch, the participants throw wine on each other until everyone is completely soaked and colored purple. The wine can be thrown using boots, bottles, water pistols, or anything that can contain liquid. This soaking was not to everyone's taste, so for several years the popularity of the pilgrimage decreased, especially for women who did not want their dresses to be stained. However, in 1949, the Battle of Wine earned its first mention in Enrique Hermosilla Díez’s article for La Rioja newspaper. Word traveled and the festival regained popularity over the following years. Today, the Haro Wine Festival annually attracts people from all over the world.

== Timeline of the festival ==
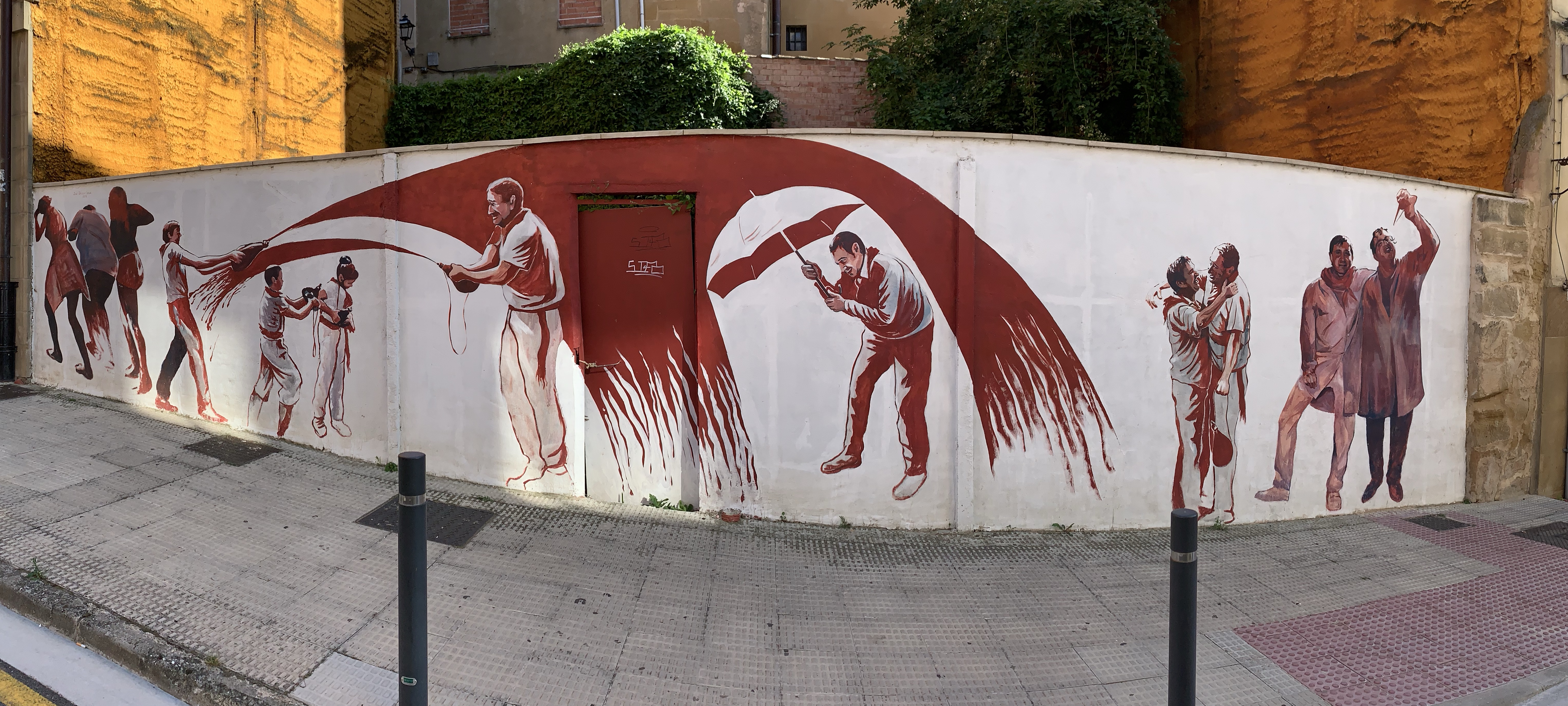
Haro Wine Battle Festival Graffiti

A little before 7:00 AM, the people, dressed in white, carry the wine to the Cliffs of Bilibio, either on foot, in trailers pulled by tractors, or in private vehicles.

Around 8:30 or 9:00 AM, depending on the year, the city mayor, who traditionally has led the festivities, leads a procession on horseback to the Chapel of San Felices de Bilibio (about six kilometers north of the city of Haro). It is a procession of people of all ages carrying jugs, bottles, and other types of containers filled with red wine. Upon their arrival to the chapel, the mayor places a banner at the top of the rocks and a mass is celebrated. After mass, a rocket is fired, officially starting the wine battle.

Around 10:30am, when the wine runs out (in 2007 it was estimated that 20,000 liters of wine were used), people begin to retreat to the city to dry their soaked clothes and have lunch. Around 12 PM, they will enter the city and head towards the bullring where several wild cattle will be released.

== Festival of National Tourist Interest ==
In 1965, the Secretariat of the Military of Information and Tourism granted the honorary title of "Festival of Tourist Interest" to the "Pilgrimage of San Felices de Bilibio.”

In 1980, the Secretary of State for Tourism published a list of festivities classifying them all as: of "International Tourist Interest," of "National Tourist Interest," or of "Tourist Interest." The Pilgrimage of San Felices de Bilibio was classified as “Festival of Tourist Interest.”

In 1988, the Ministry of Transport, Tourism, and Communications was asked to declare the pilgrimage a “Festival of National Tourist Interest,” but the proposal was rejected.

Ten years later, in 1998, the government of La Rioja granted it the title of "Festival of National Tourist Interest.”

Finally, in 2011, it was declared a “Festival of International Tourist Interest,” the highest honor a festival can receive.

== Children’s battle ==
Starting in 2004, a children’s wine battle was also held so that the youth could also enjoy the tradition. On June 26 or 27th, between 10:00 and 11:0 AM in the Plaza de la Paz in Haro, containers full of red liquid are distributed to the children. They go on a short pilgrimage to the “fairgrounds” where, after making an offer to the patron saint, the wine battle takes place. After this, the children all receive a lunch of chocolate and biscuits. Their festival continues at the Plaza where there are bullfights for youth in the town bullring.

== Similar celebrations ==
- In Jumilla, Spain, every August 15, the Great Wine Parade is celebrated, where parades and festive events are held. Floats parade around the fairgrounds, representing Jumilla and its wine. These floats are accompanied by music, traditional desserts, and many liters of wine that will end up distributed among the participants. It attracts tens of thousands of people from neighboring provinces.
- In San Asensio, Spain they have been celebrating a claret battle since 1977. In 2007, the year of its 30th anniversary, it was attended by more than a thousand people.
- In Llamigo, Spain, every September 9 they hold a mass with a procession, horse race and a wine war similar to that of Haro, during the festivities in honor of the Virgin of Loreto.
