= Church of Santo Tomás (Haro) =

- Iglesia Colegiata de Santo Tomás (Spanish)
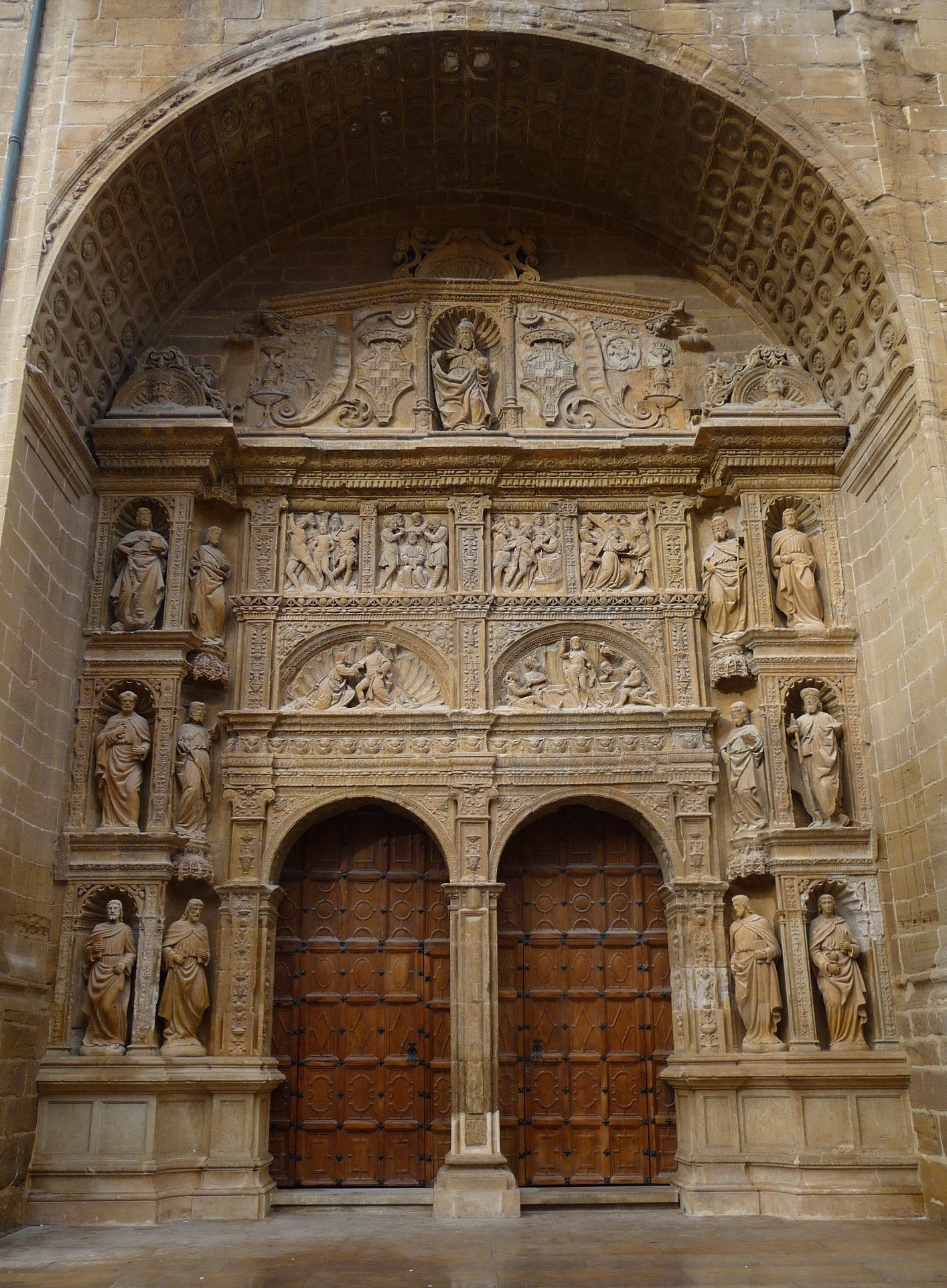

- Location within Spain
- 42.57817°N 2.845655°W
- Location: Haro, Spain

Spanish Cultural Heritage
- Official name: Iglesia Colegiata de Santo Tomás
- Type: Non-movable
- Criteria: Monument
- Designated: 1931
- Reference no.: RI-51-0000705

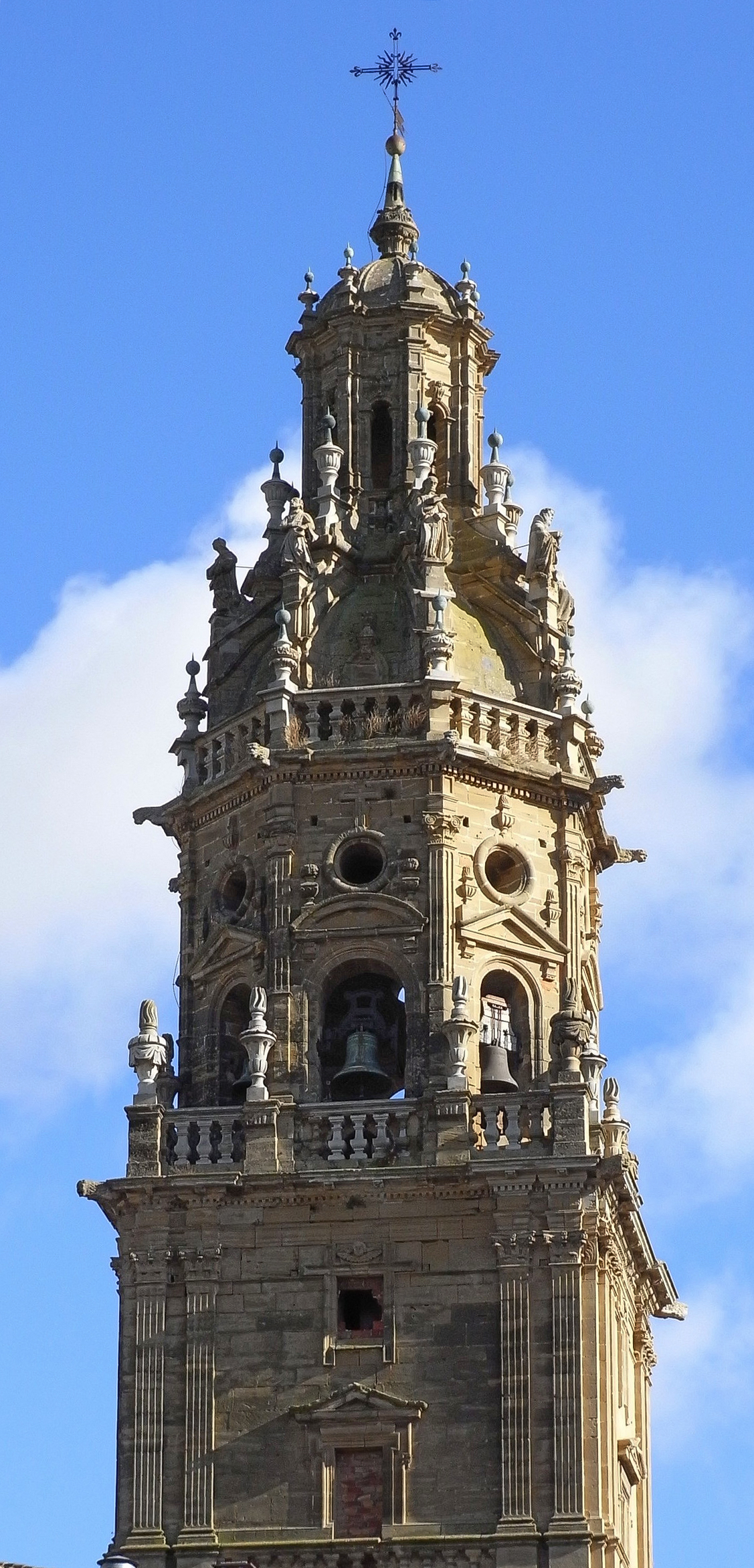
Bell tower

The Church of Santo Tomás (Spanish: Iglesia Colegiata de Santo Tomás) is a church located in Haro, Spain. The church construction started in the 16th century, and it was declared Bien de Interés Cultural in 1931.

The façade, designed by Felipe Bigarny, was finished in 1525.

The baroque bell tower was built under architect Agustín Ruiz de Azcárraga who was commissioned to work on the tower in 1719, and has inspired other buildings such as the Co-cathedral of Santa María de la Redonda or Our Lady of the Assumption Church in Briones.
