= Haro, La Rioja =

Haro
- Municipality
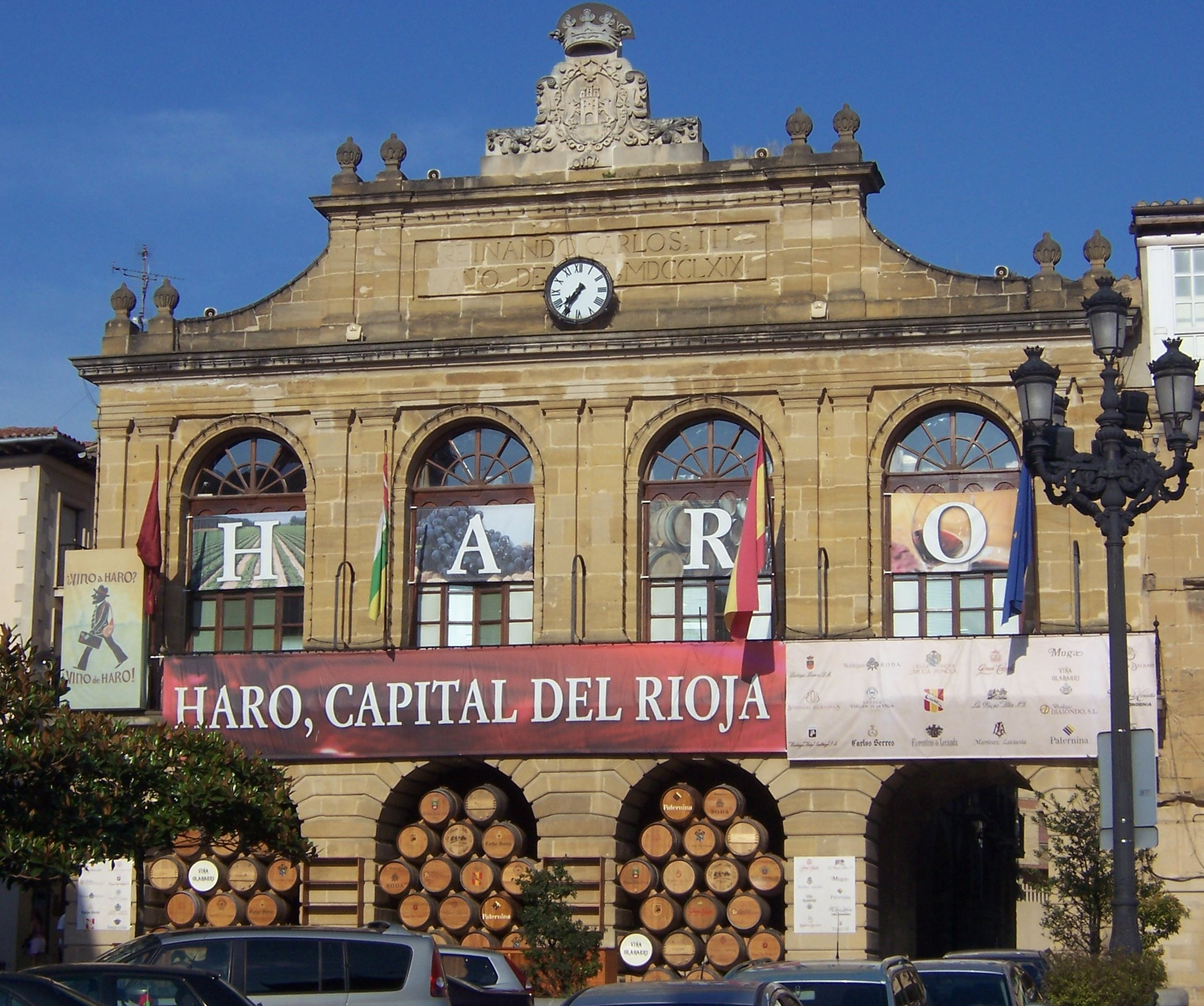

- Coat of arms

- Location within La Rioja, Spain Location within Spain
- Coordinates: 42°35′N 2°51′W
- Country: Spain
- Autonomous community: La Rioja
- Comarca: Haro

Government
  - Mayor: Laura Rivado Casas (PSOE)

Area
  - Total: 40.53 km^{2} (15.65 sq mi)
- Elevation: 479 m (1,572 ft)

Population (2025-01-01)
  - Total: 12,167
  - Density: 300.2/km^{2} (777.5/sq mi)
- Demonym(s): harense; jarrero, ra
- Time zone: UTC+1 (CET)
  - Summer (DST): UTC+2 (CET)
- Website: www.haro.org/es

Haro (Spanish: [ˈaɾo]) is a town and municipality in the northwest of La Rioja province in Northern Spain. It hosts the annual Haro Wine Festival, as it produces red wine. Its architectural heritage includes the plateresque main entrance of the Church of Santo Tomás, the work of Felipe Vigarny, numerous palaces, and the old town, which was declared a Historic-Artistic Site in 1975.

Haro was the first town in Spain to have electric street lighting.

== History ==
There are several theories about the founding of Haro, though the most realistic theory is that of Domingo Hergueta, who argued that before the town, there was a lighthouse (Spanish: faro) near the village of Cerro de la Mota which illuminated the mouth of the Ebro river. The town was named for the lighthouse, and Faro later evolved into Haro.

During the Roman rule of Hispania, a fort called Castrum Bibilium was built in the cliffs of Bibilio. The first mention of Haro dates back to the year 1040, in a document of king García Sánchez III of Navarre"el de Nájera". Alfonso VI of León and Castile entrusted the tenencia to Diego López I de Haro after the death of Count García Ordóñez and the first of the lords of Biscay to attach the name of this town to his patronymic was Diego's son, Lope Díaz I de Haro.

In the Middle Ages, Haro was home to a Jewish community until the expulsion of the Jews.

Since the early 19th century Haro has established a worldwide reputation for being the most important wine town in the Rioja wine region and remains so today even though the number of Bodegas in the region have multiplied 8 times to 574 during the past 50 years (1970 to 2020). The key focus of this reputation is at the Barrio Estación where 7 of the best Rioja Bodegas are located - namely Bodegas Bilbainas (founded 1859); Compañia Vinícola del Norte de España [CVNE] f.1879; R. López de Heredia (f 1877); Bodegas Roda (f 1989); Bodegas Muga (f.1932); Bodegas La Rioja Alta S.A. (f.1890). In other parts of the town are Bodegas Martnez Lacuesta (f.1873); Bodega Berceo (f.1801); Carlos Serres (f.1896) and Ramon Bilbao (f.1924). Féderico Paaternina was founded in 1897 and became a very influential name in the wine business in Spain until its final collapse in 2010 when the Bodega closed and the brand of Banda Azul was sold to Berberana following a very difficult period after the appropriation of their owners Rumasa in 1983 by the new Spanish Government and the failure of the subsequent owner to keep the company as a going concern.(1)

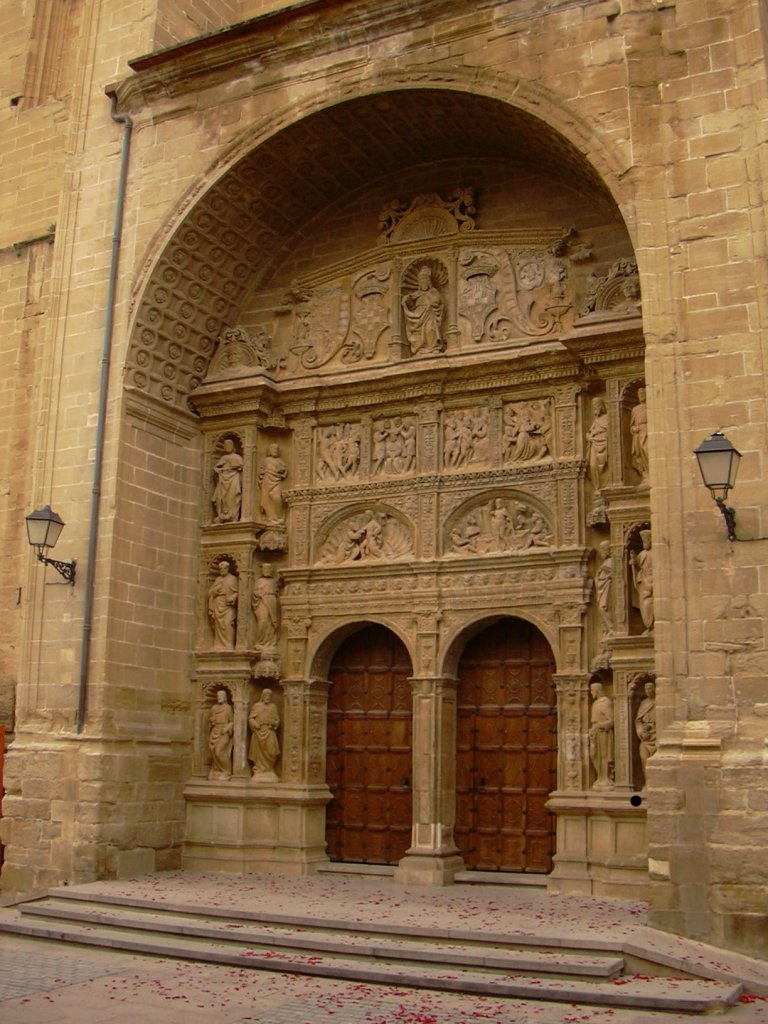
Plateresque Facade de la Church of Santo Tomás, Felipe Bigarny's work.

== Notable people ==
- Manuel Risco (1735–1801), historian
- Manuel Bartolomé Cossío (1857–1935), educator
- Lucrecia Arana (1871–1927), singer
- José María Mazón Sainz (1901–1981), politician
- Eduardo Fajardo (1924–2019), actor
- Luis de la Fuente (born 1961), footballer
- Ana Ibáñez Llorente (born 1981), TV personality

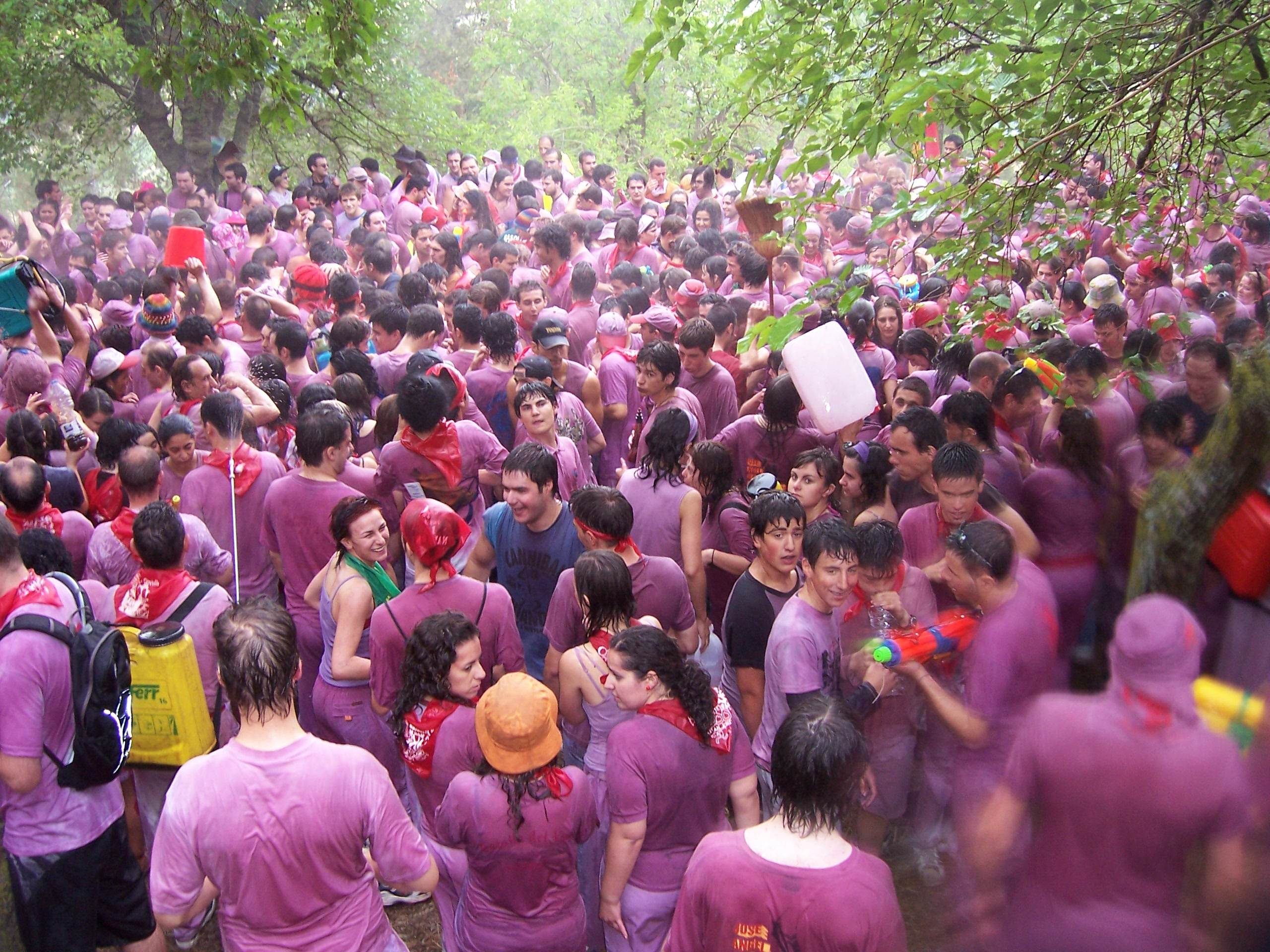
Haro Wine Festival

== See also ==
- House of Haro
- Tempranillo
- Rioja wine
