= Monastery of Santa Maria de la Piedad (Casalarreina) =

Monastery of Ntra. Sra. de la Piedad
- Monasterio de Ntra. Sra. de la Piedad (Spanish)
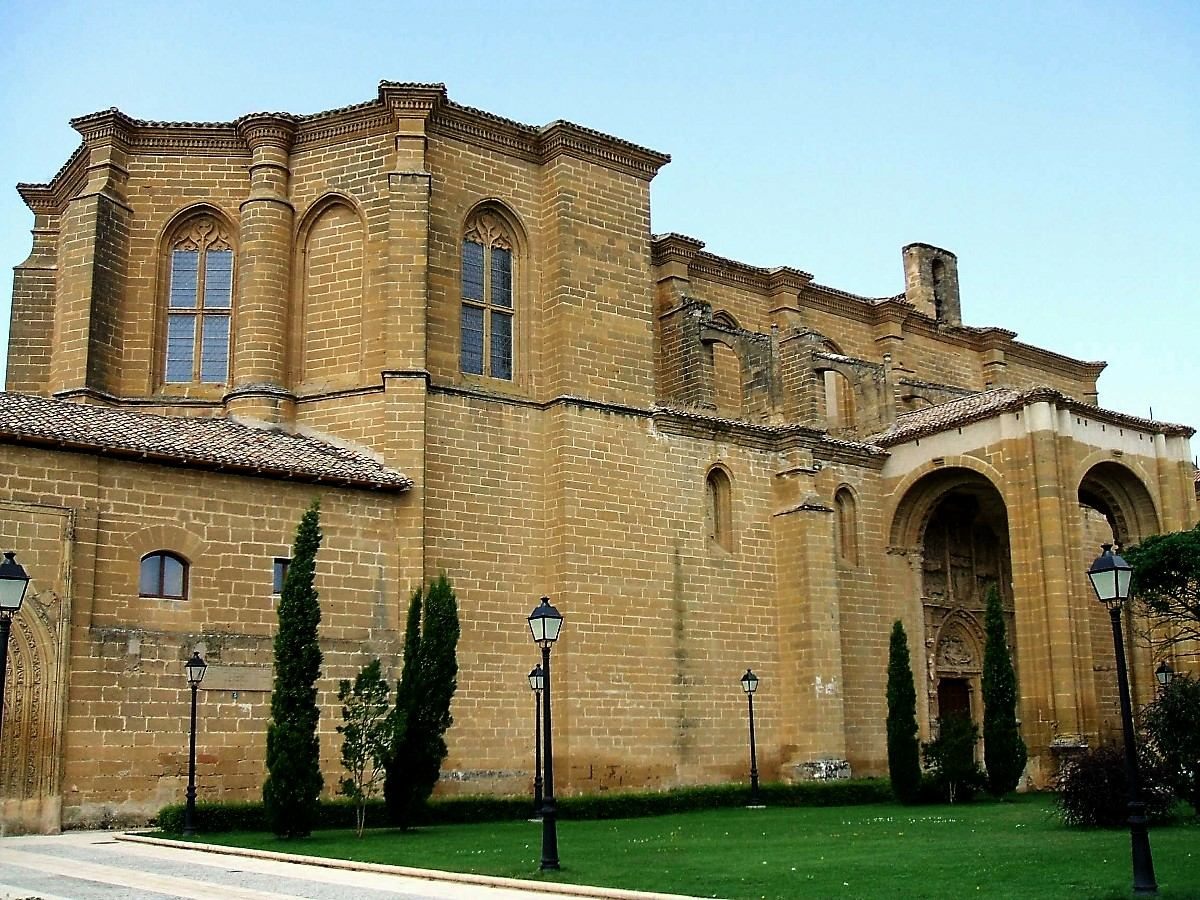

- Location within Spain
- 42.54699°N 2.913445°W
- Location: Casalarreina, Spain

Spanish Cultural Heritage
- Official name: Monasterio de Ntra. Sra. de la Piedad
- Type: Non-movable
- Criteria: Monument
- Designated: 1977
- Reference no.: RI-51-0005009

The Monastery of Ntra. Sra. de la Piedad (Spanish: Monasterio de Ntra. Sra. de la Piedad) is a monastery located in Casalarreina, Spain. It was declared Bien de Interés Cultural in 1977.
