= Pampliega =

Coordinates: 42°12′N 3°59′W

- Municipality and town
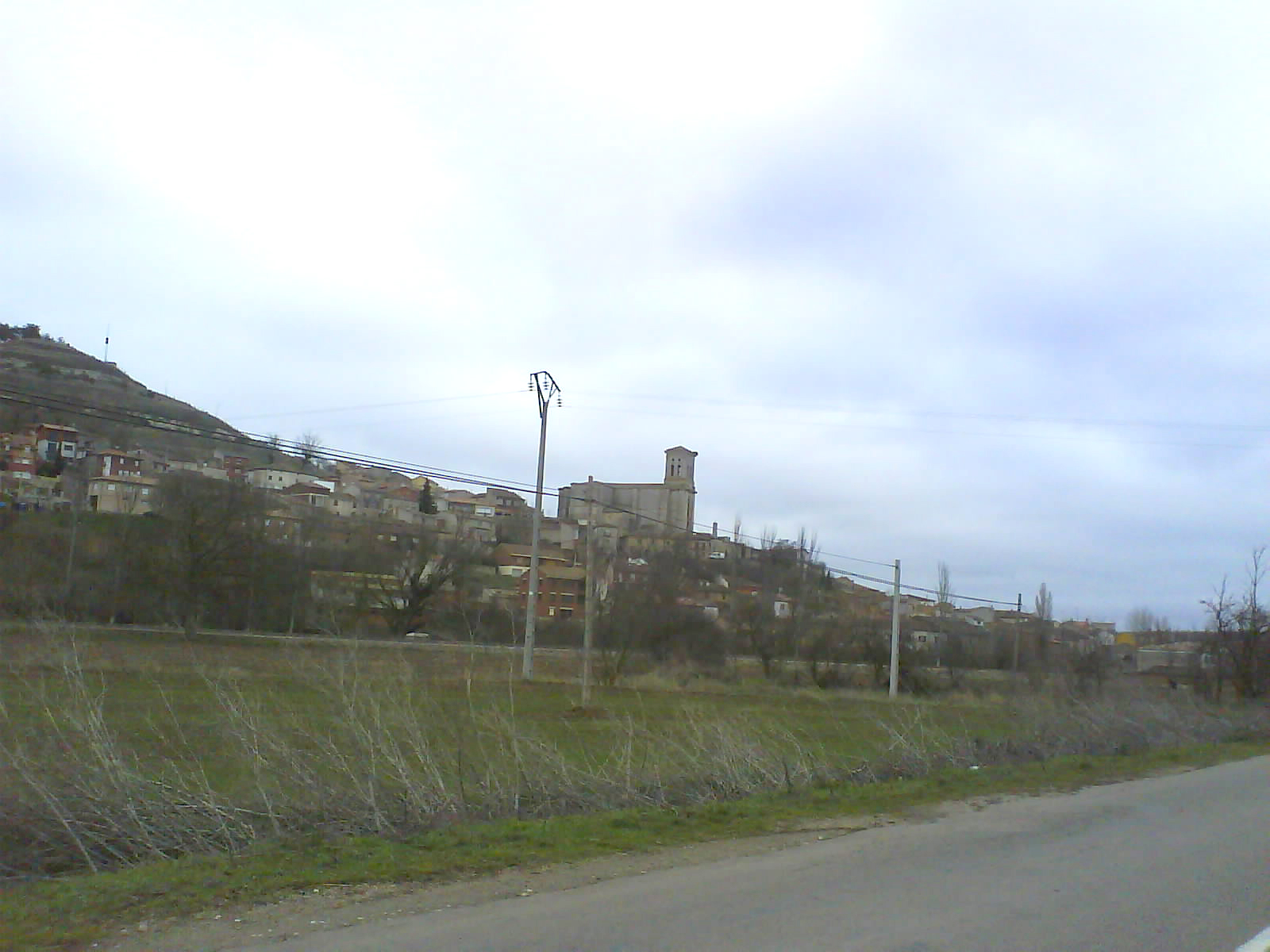
- View of Pampliega, 2008

- Flag Coat of arms
- Interactive map of Pampliega
- Country: Spain
- Autonomous community: Castile and León
- Province: Burgos
- Comarca: Arlanza

Area
  - Total: 24.40 km^{2} (9.42 sq mi)
- Elevation: 809 m (2,654 ft)

Population (2025-01-01)
  - Total: 281
  - Density: 11.5/km^{2} (29.8/sq mi)
- Time zone: UTC+1 (CET)
  - Summer (DST): UTC+2 (CEST)
- Postal code: 09220
- Website: https://www.pampliega.es/

Pampliega is a municipality and town located in the province of Burgos, Castile and León, Spain. According to the 2005 census (INE), the municipality had a population of 395 inhabitants.

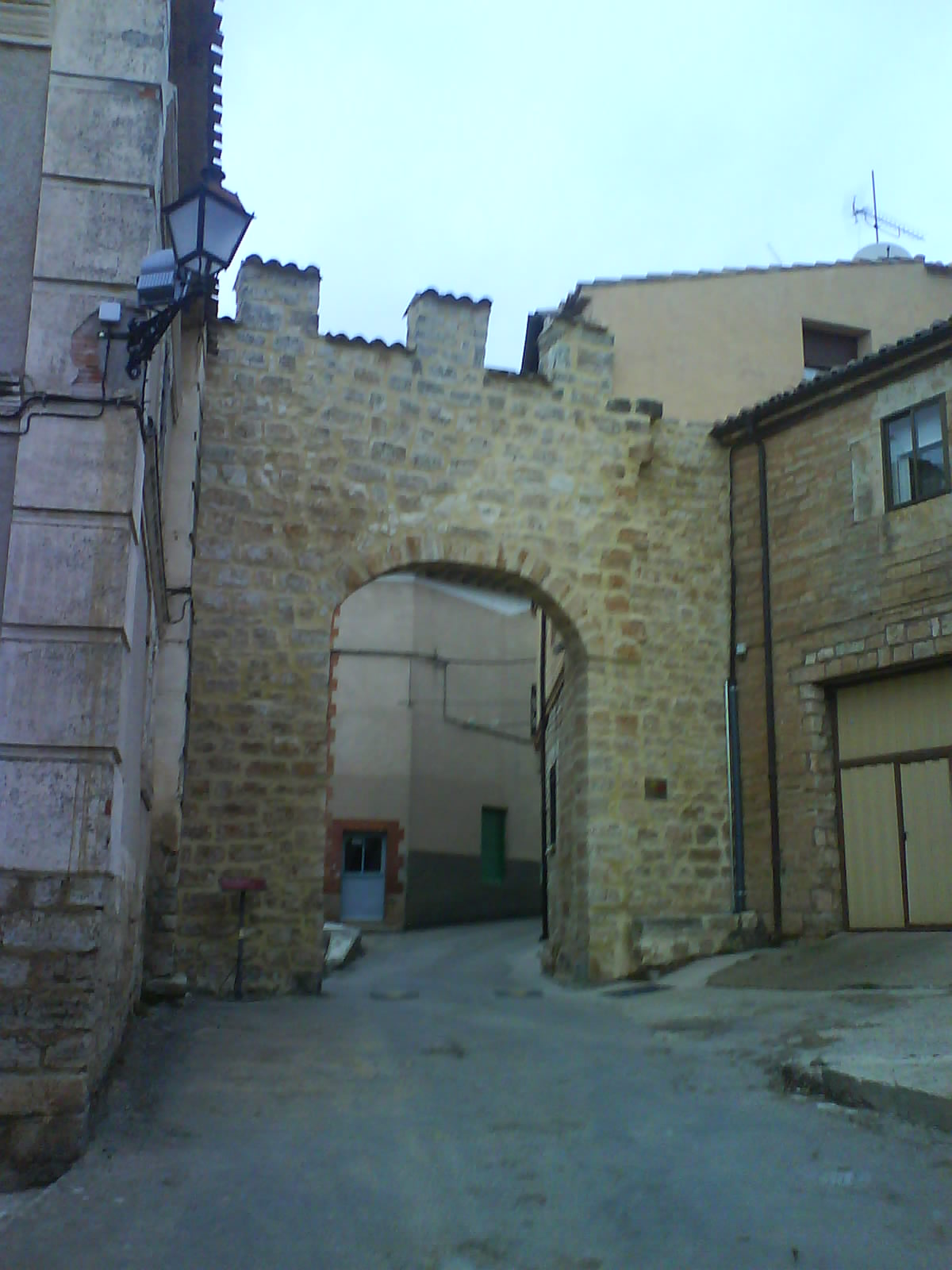
Presencio Door, and the ruins of the city walls.
