= San Gil Abad =

Church in Burgos, Spain

Coordinates: 42°20′37″N 3°42′09″W

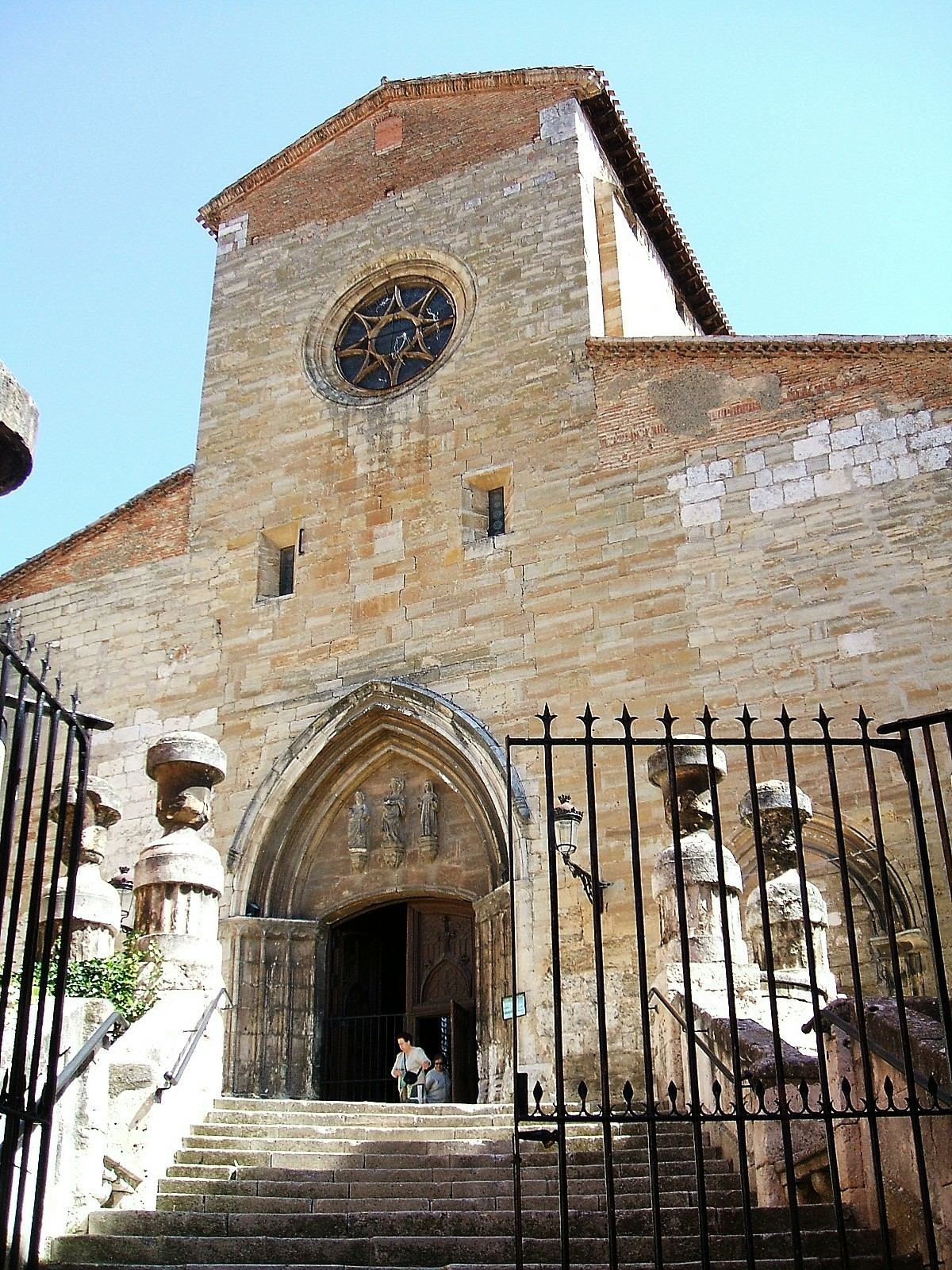

Iglesia de San Gil Abad is a church in Burgos, Spain. It dates to the 14th-15th century. It was declared a Bien de Interés Cultural site by decree of 3 June 1931.
