= Casalarreina =

- Municipality
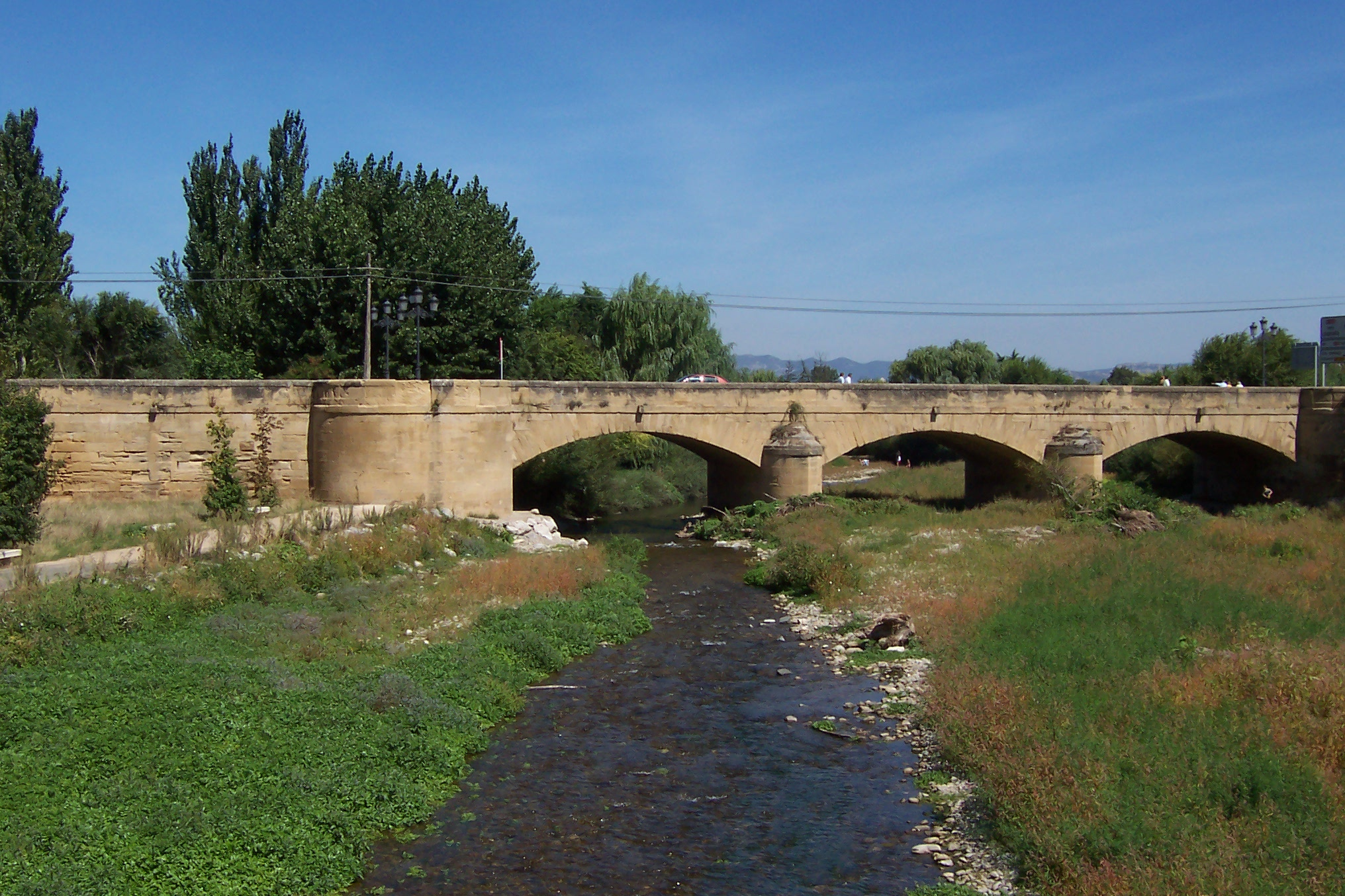
- Bridge over the Oja river

- Coat of arms

- Location of Casalarreina within La Rioja
- Coordinates: 42°32′51″N 2°54′45″W
- Comarca: Spain
- Autonomous community: La Rioja
- Comarca: Haro

Government
  - Mayor: Félix Caperos Elosúa (PSOE)

Area
  - Total: 8.13 km^{2} (3.14 sq mi)
- Elevation: 500 m (1,600 ft)

Population (2025-01-01)
  - Total: 1,094
  - Density: 135/km^{2} (349/sq mi)
- Demonym(s): casalarreitero, ra
- Time zone: UTC+1 (CET)
  - Summer (DST): UTC+2 (CEST)
- Postal code: 26230
- Website: www.casalarreina.es

Casalarreina is a town located in the province of La Rioja, Spain. It is located 47 kilometres (29 mi) from Logroño, the capital of La Rioja, in the north-west.

The first documents about the village were around 1170 by Aldonza Ruiz de Castro.

The town borders the Basque-Aragonese freeway. In 2011, there were 1,355 inhabitants.INE

== Demographics ==
Historical population
Year	Pop.	±%
1900	1,713	—
1910	1,415	−17.4%
1920	1,408	−0.5%
1930	1,468	+4.3%
1940	1,426	−2.9%
1950	1,329	−6.8%
1960	1,196	−10.0%
1970	1,032	−13.7%
1980	903	−12.5%
1990	969	+7.3%
2000	901	−7.0%
2011	1,306	+45.0%
2014	1,187	−9.1%

== Politics ==
List of mayors since the democratic elections of 1979
Term	Mayor	Political party
1979–1983	Antonio Vozmediano Repes	Grouping of electors
1983–1987	Antonio Zabala Elosúa	AP
1987–1991	Buenaventura Gómez Castrillo	PP
1991–1995	Buenaventura Gómez Castrillo	PP
1995–1999	Antonio Vozmediano Repes/Santos Salinas Puerta †	PP
1999–2003	Félix Caperos Elosúa/Ángel Ortiz Ruiz	PSOE/PP
2003–2007	David Isasi García	PP
2007–2011	Félix Caperos Elosúa	PSOE
2011–2015	Félix Caperos Elosúa	PSOE
2015–2019	Félix Caperos Elosúa	PSOE
2019–2023	Félix Caperos Elosúa	PSOE
2023–	n/d	n/d

== Points of interest ==
=== Monastery of Santa Maria de la Piedad ===
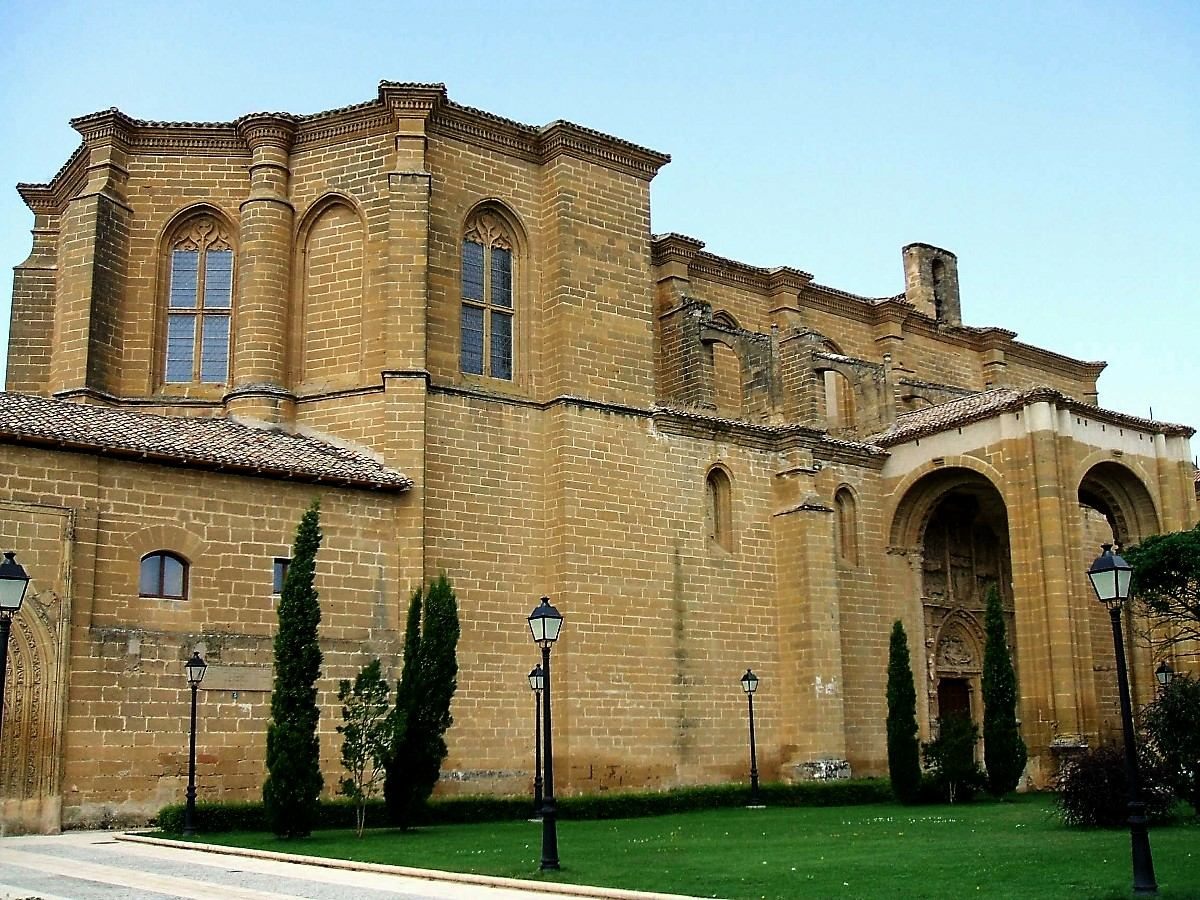
Monastery of Santa Maria de la Piedad.

=== Church of Saint Martin ===
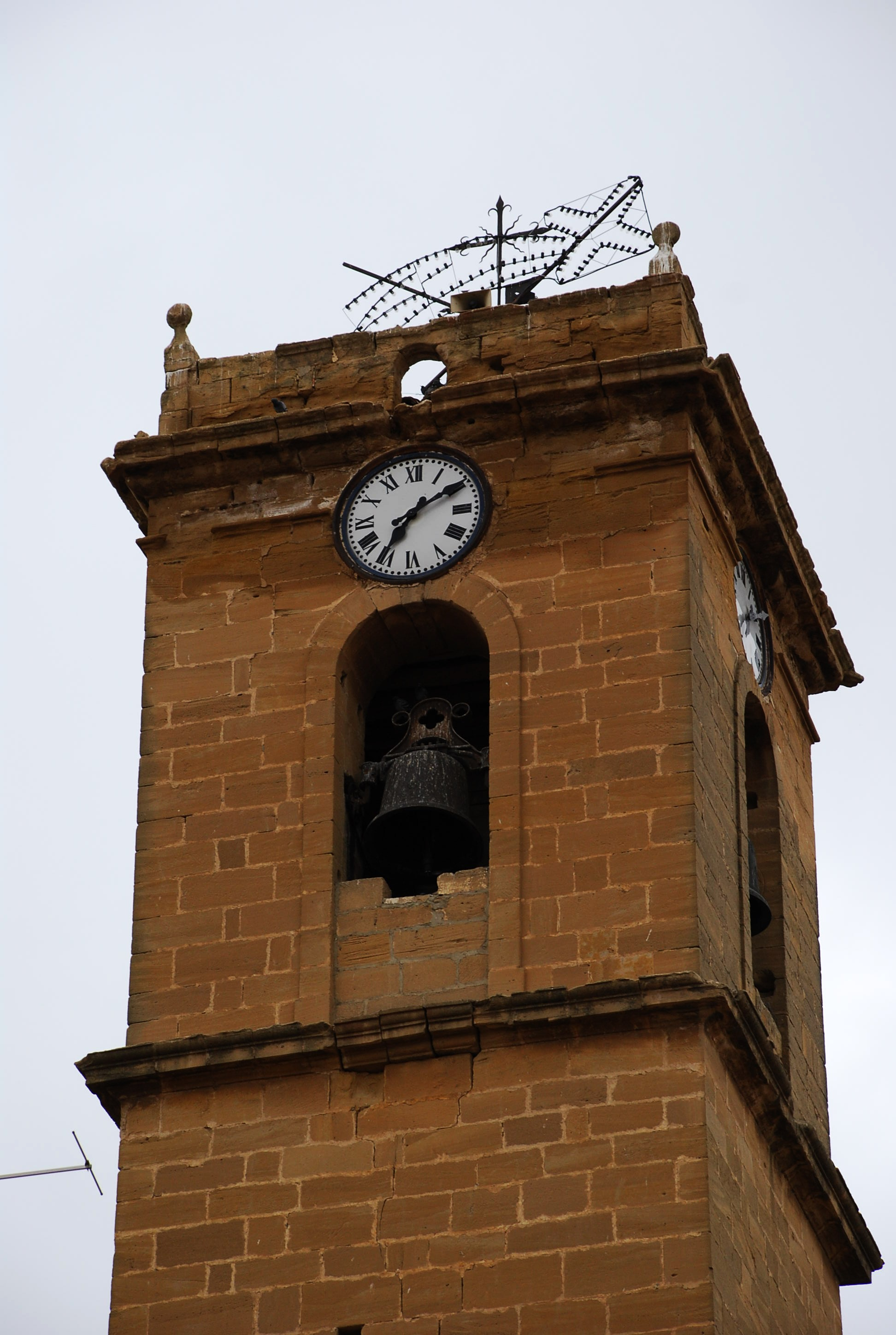
Tower of the church of Saint Martin.

=== Pobes Family Palace ===
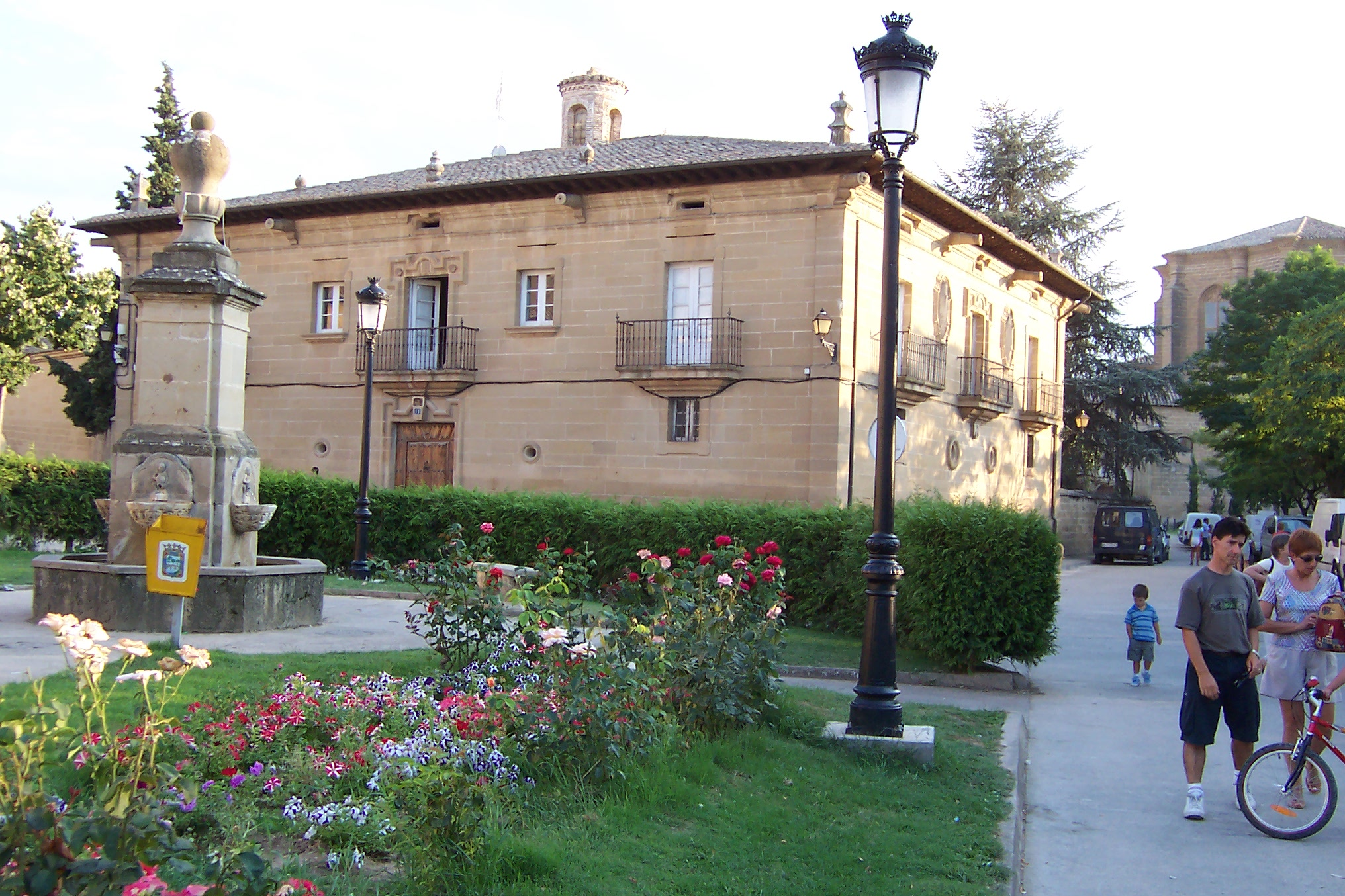
Pobes Family Palace

=== Palace of the Constable of Castile ===
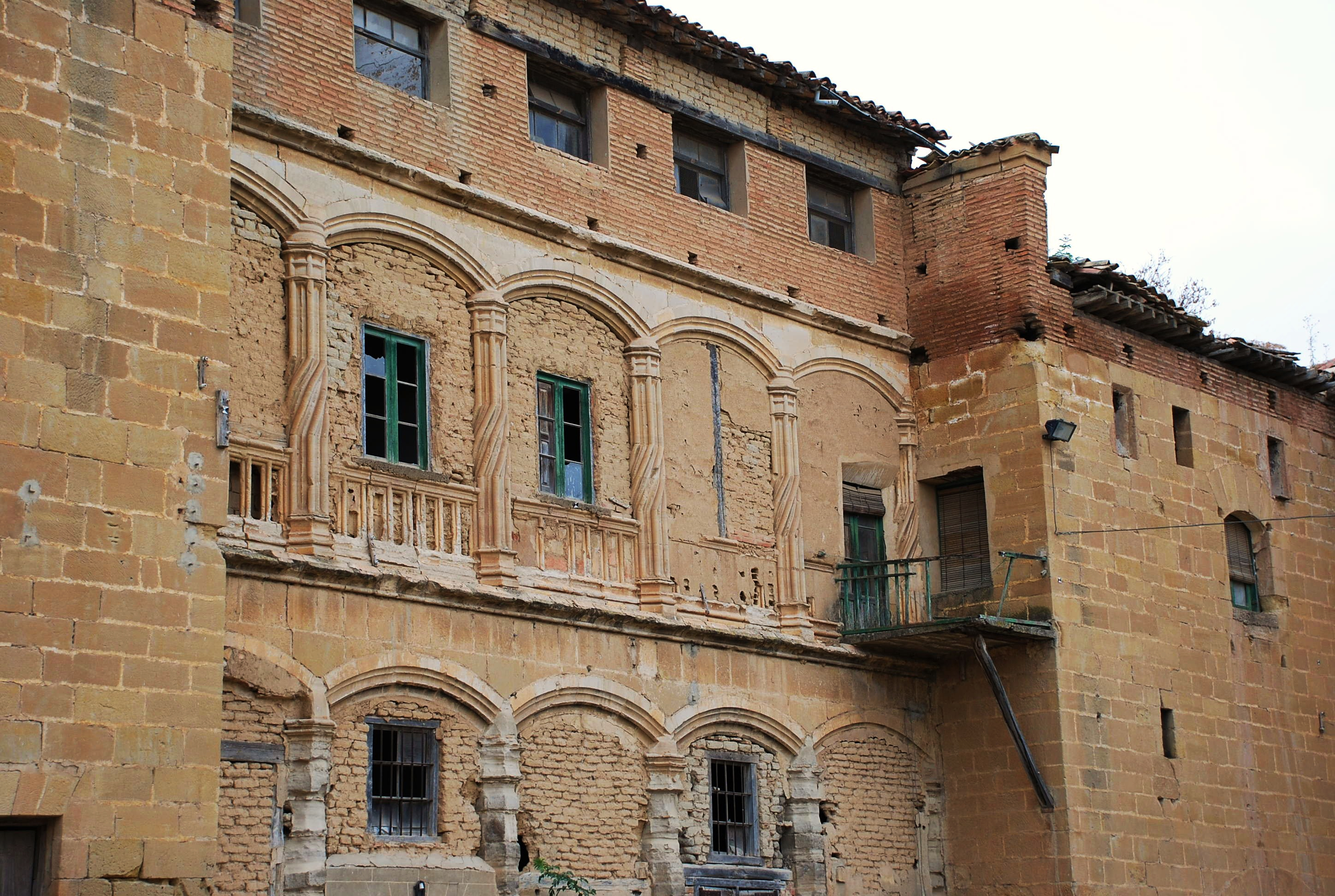
Palace of the Constable of Castile
