= Vilviestre del Pinar =

Coordinates: 41°57′N 3°04′W

- municipality
- Coat of arms
- Interactive map of Vilviestre del Pinar
- Country: Spain
- Autonomous community: Castile and León
- Province: Burgos

Area
  - Total: 33 km^{2} (13 sq mi)

Population (2025-01-01)
  - Total: 511
  - Density: 15/km^{2} (40/sq mi)
- Time zone: UTC+1 (CET)
  - Summer (DST): UTC+2 (CEST)

Vilviestre del Pinar is a municipality located in the province of Burgos, Castile and León, Spain. According to the 2004 census (INE), the municipality has a population of 751 inhabitants.

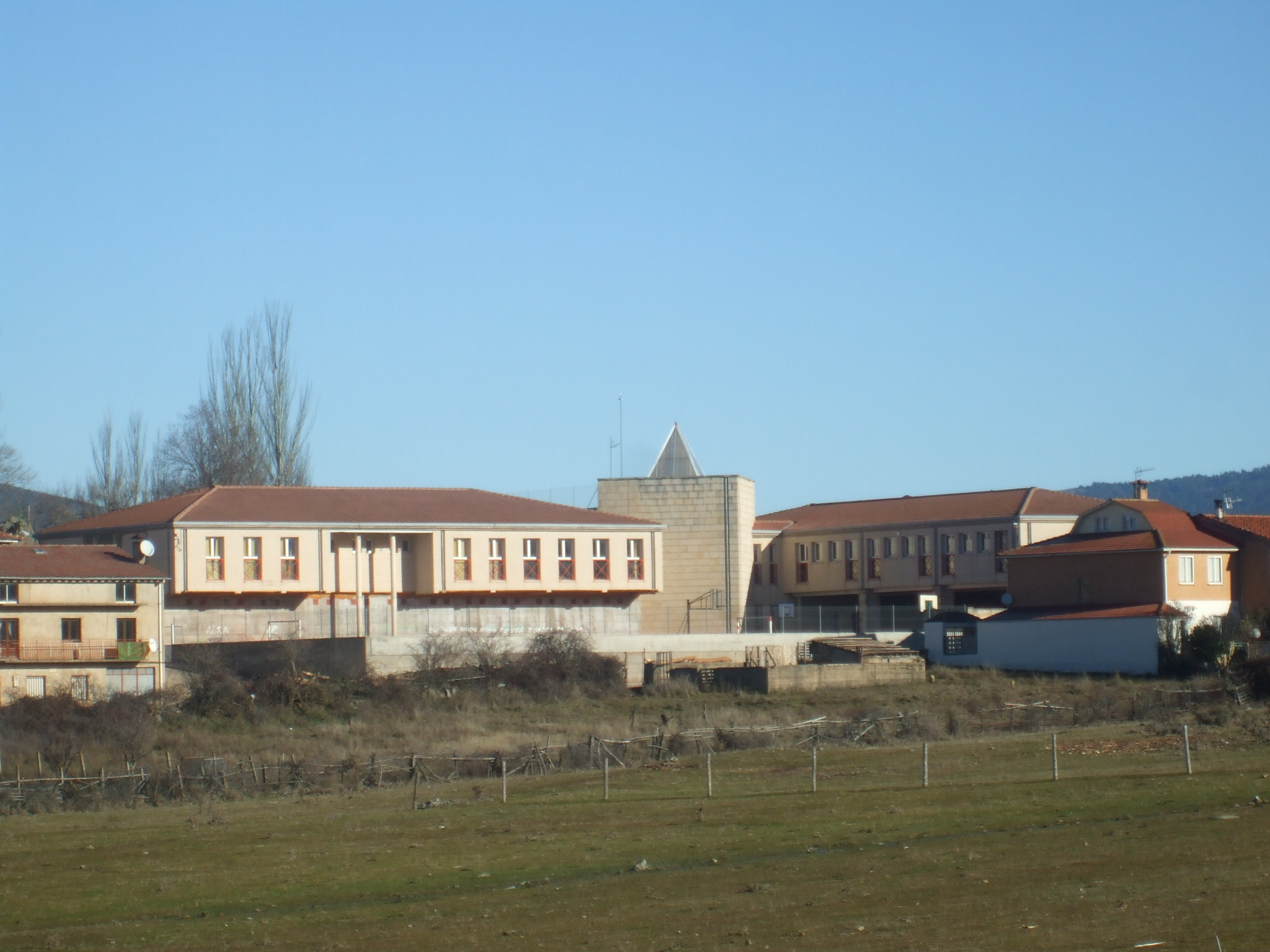
Primary schools in Vilviestre del Pinar
