= Santa María del Campo =

Coordinates: 42°08′N 3°58′W

- Municipality and town
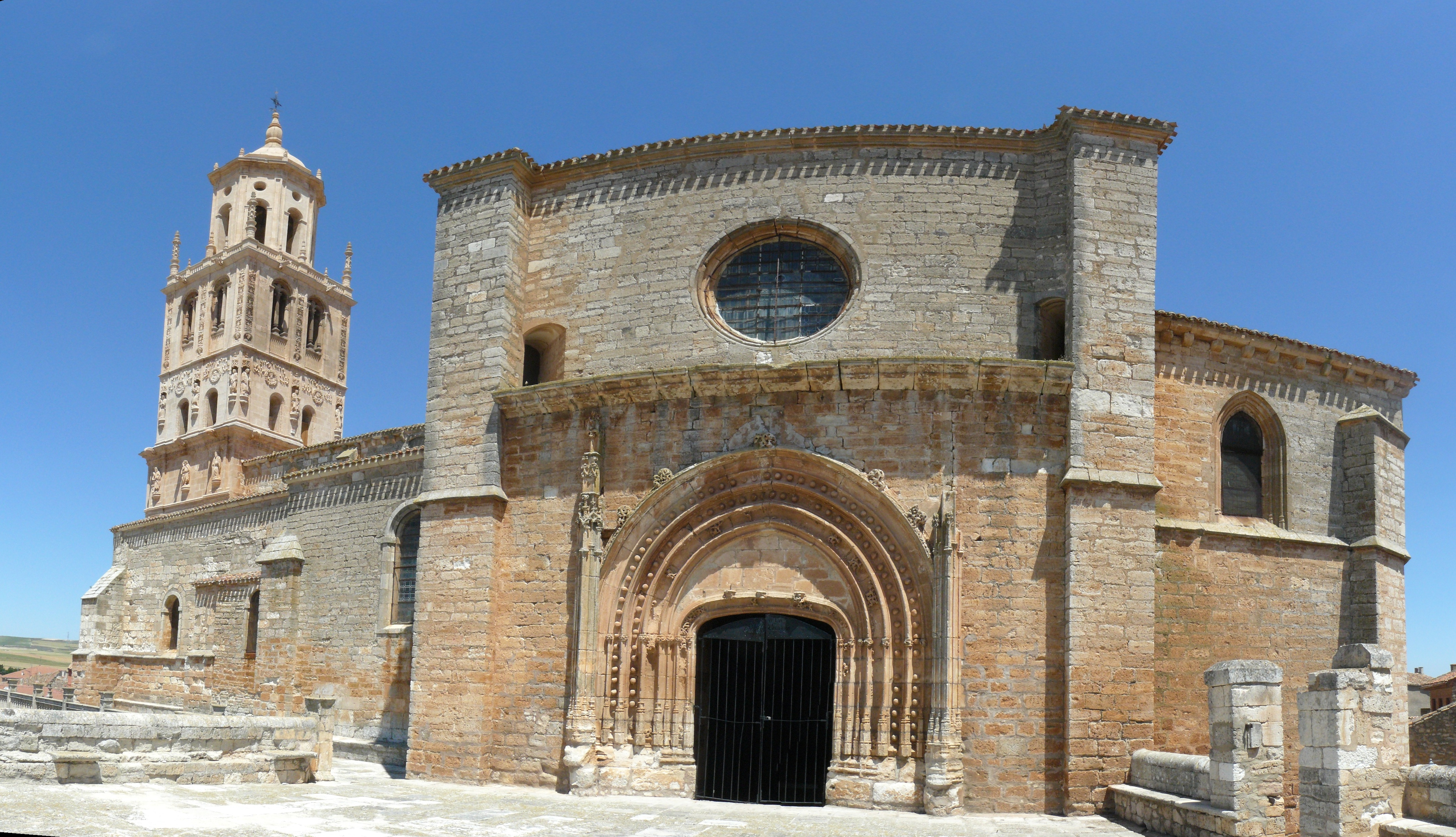
- Nuestra Señora de la Asunción collegiate church (13th-18th century)

- Flag Coat of arms
- Interactive map of Santa María del Campo
- Country: Spain
- Autonomous community: Castile and León
- Province: Burgos
- Comarca: Arlanza

Area
  - Total: 60.32 km^{2} (23.29 sq mi)
- Elevation: 815 m (2,674 ft)

Population (2025-01-01)
  - Total: 508
  - Density: 8.42/km^{2} (21.8/sq mi)
- Time zone: UTC+1 (CET)
  - Summer (DST): UTC+2 (CEST)
- Postal code: 09342
- Website: https://www.santamariadelcampo.es/

Santa Maria del Campo is a town and municipality in the Province of Burgos, Spain. The village is in the wine region known as Ribera del Arlanza, 22 km from Lerma.

== History ==
Santa María Del Campo was rebuilt in 1440 in the Lombard-Gothic style, having already existed in the 12th century under the name of Saint Maria of the Perch. The church is located in the highest area of the town at more than 800 meters above sea level. The boundaries of the municipality of Santa María del Campo are established in approximately 60 square kilometers, and includes the town of Escuderos (with a current population of about 650 inhabitants) under its administration.

== Architecture ==
Santa María Del Campo was built in a Latin cross plan consisting of three naves as well as two chapels on each side. The building itself is mostly a combination of two construction stages. The part located at the foot of the ships is archaic with its 13th century principles, and has a small cloister dating back to 1425. In Bishop Acuña's time at the end of the 15th century, it became a new more slender and luminous head with a cover in each end of the cruise. Among the greatest works of this church is the monumental tower built by Diego de Siloe in 1527 having defeated Felipe Vigarny in the contest called for its construction. The entrance to the church is covered with a barrel vault with casetones, and is flanked, externally, by half Corinthian columns, which leaves space for niches in which statues are placed. The church has a total of three entrances with the main one located under the tower and the other two located in the cruise. The northern portal was carved beginning in the 16th century. The choir was dismantled in 1757 and moved to the central nave. The masonry at the end of the 15th century, is decorated with a series of geometric motifs of an advanced Gothic style. The presbytery is located at a higher level compared to the rest of the church. Attached to one of the transept pillars is a plaster pulpit that was built during the beginning of the 16th century.

== Art ==
The very simple yet elegant interior hosts interesting paintings, frescoes and stuccoes by local artists of the 16th and 17th centuries, including the work of Giovanni Battista Crespi (Mercy and Musiciant Angels) and the Madonna del latte by Tommasino from Mortara which is an object of great devotion, following some miracles that were attributed to Her. The main altarpiece was created by José Valdán and Joaquín de Villandiego in the 18th century. Six painting boards of different altarpieces were assembled in order to form the current altar of the trascoro, in front of the main entrance door to the church. The tables of the Degollación of San Juan Bautista and The Baptism of Christ are works of Pedro Berruguete.

== Holidays ==
March 18 to 19, a festival is celebrated in honor of San José.

In mid-August the patron saint festivities take place in honor of Our Lady of the Assumption and of San Roque.

Pilgrimage of Our Lady of Squires, held on September 24.
