= Montes de Oca (comarca) =

Coordinates: 42.4025°N 3.2109°W

- Comarca
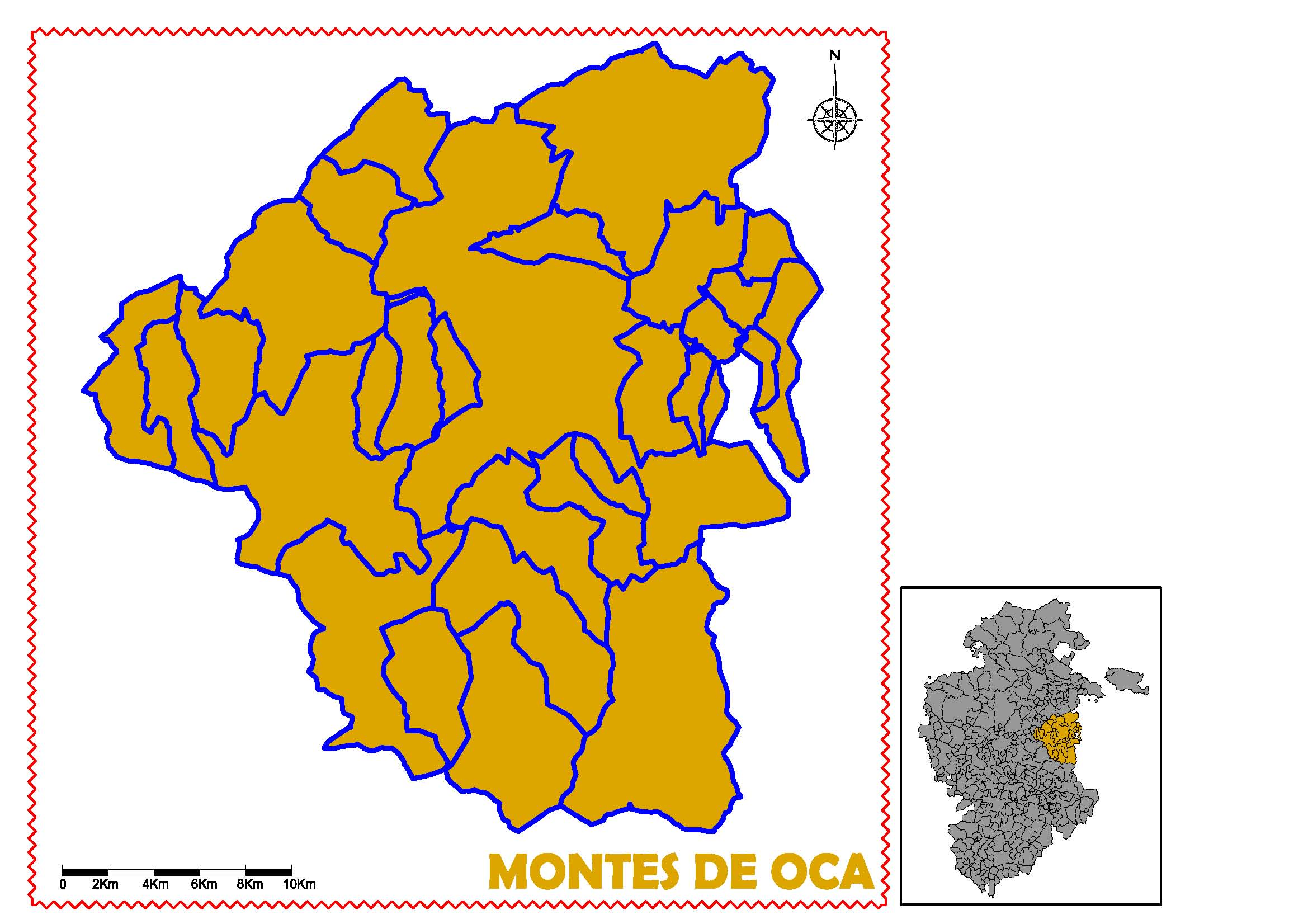
- Country: Spain
- Autonomous community: Castile and León
- Province: Burgos
- Capital: Belorado
- Time zone: UTC+1 (CET)
  - Summer (DST): UTC+2 (CEST)
- Largest municipality: Belorado

Montes de Oca is a comarca located east of the province of Burgos, in the autonomous community of Castile and León. It is bounded on the north by La Bureba, south by the Sierra de la Demanda comarca, on the east by the province of La Rioja and west by the Alfoz de Burgos.

== History ==
When the Roman legions arrived to the area, it was the territory of the Autrigones tribe.

After the Berber withdrawal, Alfonso II's depopulation (circa 742) and the razzias undertaken at the turn of the ninth century, the Montes de Oca were repopulated mainly by Astures, Cantabri, Visigoths, and Vascones (Basques) in the mid-ninth century, although remained border between the County of Castile with the Caliphate of Córdoba and its allies for at least a century and was afterwards border between kingdom of Castile and the kingdom of Navarre till the mid-twelfth century. During this period the shire to which belonged change from one kingdom to another until finally passed to the kingdom of Castile after an award, in 1146.

== Administrative Entities ==
The comarca capital is Belorado and this small city agrees with its old judicial party, excluding Alcocero de Mola.

=== Municipalities (26) ===
The comarca contains the following municipalities:

- Arraya de Oca
- Bascuñana
- Belorado
- Carrias
- Castildelgado
- Cerezo de Río Tirón
- Cerratón de Juarros
- Espinosa del Camino
- Fresneda de la Sierra Tirón
- Fresneña
- Fresno de Río Tirón
- Ibrillos
- Pradoluengo
- Rábanos
- Redecilla del Camino
- Redecilla del Campo
- San Vicente del Valle
- Santa Cruz del Valle Urbión
- Tosantos
- Valle de Oca
- Valmala
- Viloria de Rioja
- Villaescusa la Sombría
- Villafranca Montes de Oca
- Villagalijo
- Villambistia

=== Minor Local Entities (26) ===
The name of the municipality the entity belongs to is in parentheses.

- Alarcia (Rábanos)
- Cueva Cardiel (Oca)
- Espinosa del Monte (San Vicente)
- Eterna (Burgos) (Belorado)
- Ezquerra (Villagalijo)
- Fresneña (*)
- Garganchón (Pradoluengo)
- Ocón de Villafranca (Villafranca)
- Puras de Villafranca (Belorado)
- Quintanaloranco (Belorado)
- Quintanilla del Monte en Rioja (Redecilla del Campo)
- Quintanilla del Monte en Juarros (Villaescusa)
- Rábanos (*)
- San Clemente del Valle (San Vicente)
- San Pedro del Monte en Rioja (Bascuñana)
- Santa Olalla del Valle (Villagalijo)
- Sotillo de Rioja (Redecilla del Campo)
- Turrientes (Cerratón)
- Villaescusa la Solana (Villaescusa)
- Villaescusa la Sombría
- Villalbos (Oca)
- Villalmóndar (Oca)
- Villalómez (Oca)
- Villamayor del Río (Fresneña)
- Villamudria (Rábanos)
- Villanasur Río de Oca (Oca)

=== Villages (12) ===
- Ahedillo (Alarcia) D
- Alba (Villafranca) D
- Avellanosa de Rioja (Belorado)
- Castil de Carrias (Belorado)
- Loranquillo (Belorado)
- Mozoncillo de Oca (Oca)
- Pradilla de Belorado (Fresneda)
- Quintanilla de las Dueñas (Cerezo)
- San Cristóbal del Monte (Fresneña)
- San Miguel de Pedroso (Belorado)
- San Otero (Cerratón)
- Soto del Valle (Santa Cruz)

== See also ==
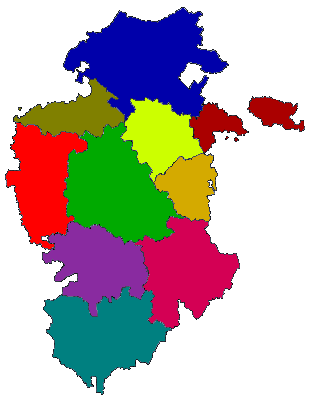
Shires of the province of Burgos.: Páramos Alfoz de Burgos Odra y Pisuerga Arlanza Ribera del Duero / Merindades Ebro La Bureba Montes de Oca Sierra de la Demanda

- Province of Burgos
- Comarcas of Spain
