= Oca (river) =

River in Spain

Oca Latin: Vesica
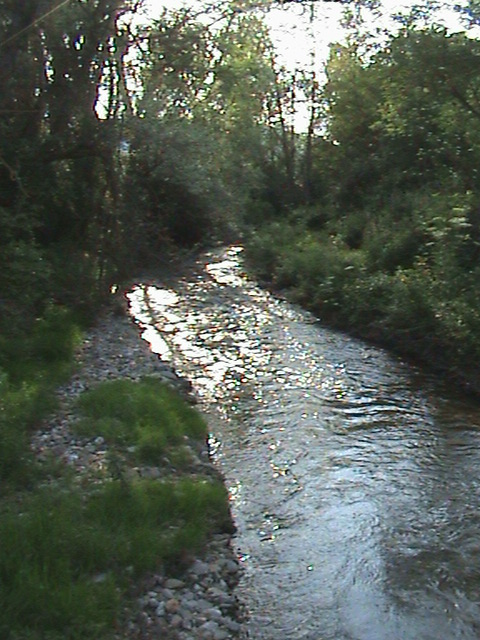
- Watershed of the Oca at Villalbos (Valle de Oca)

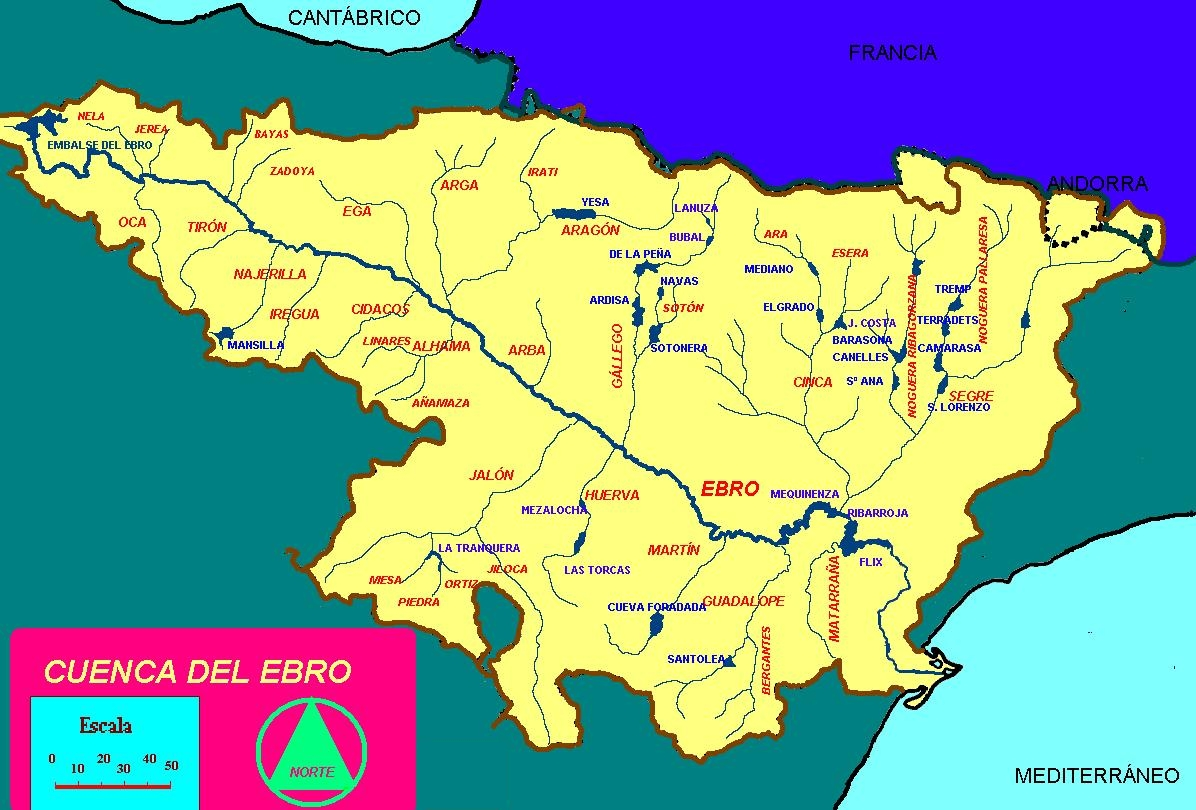
- Oca river is the first Ebro tributary river on the right bank

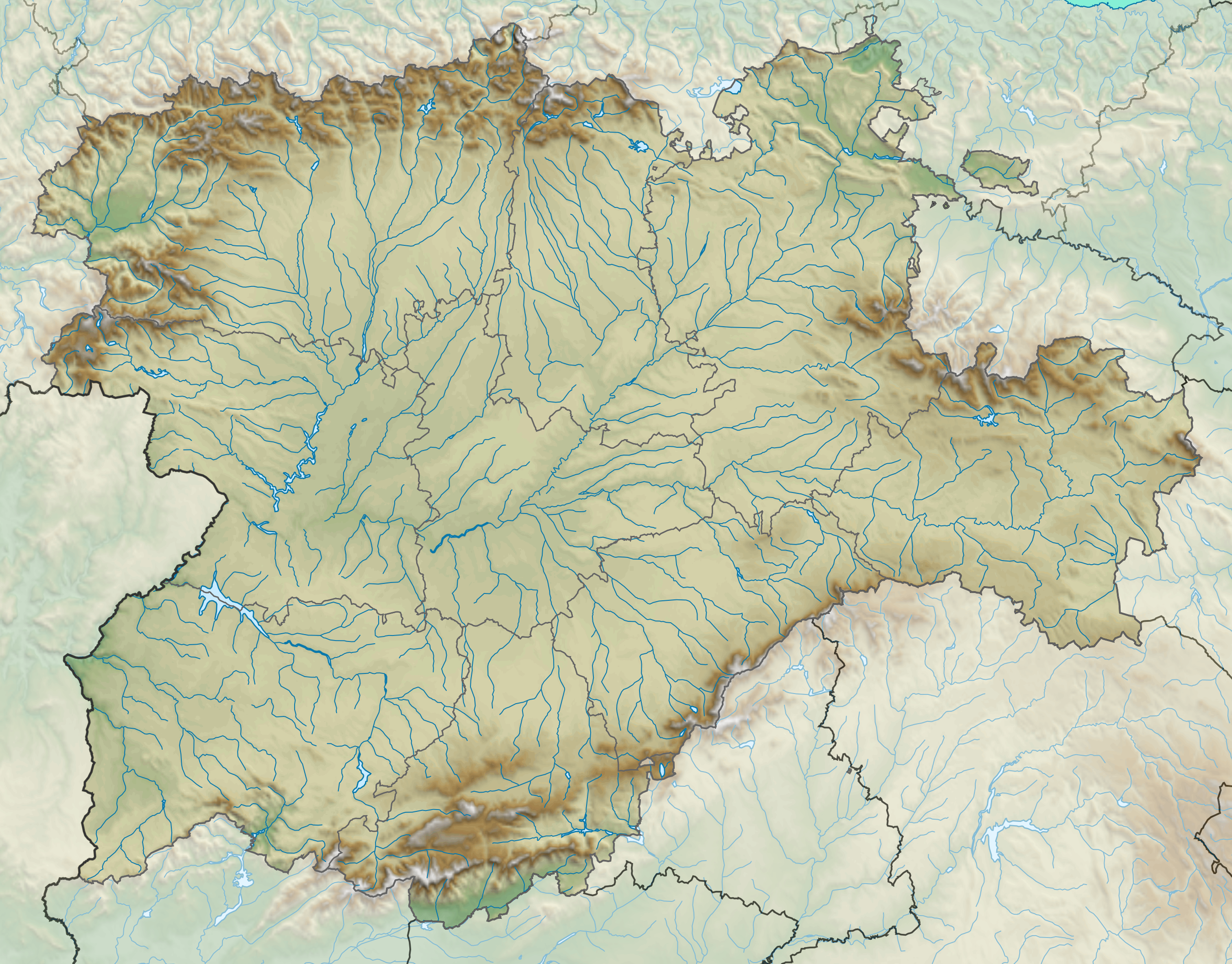
- Location of the mouth with Castile and León Oca (river) (Spain)

Location
- Country: Spain

Physical characteristics
- Source: Montes de Oca
  - location: Rábanos, Montes de Oca, Burgos, Castile and León, Spain
  - elevation: 1,186 m (3,891 ft)
- Mouth: Horadada Gorge, Ebro river
  - location: Oña, La Bureba, Burgos, Castile and León, Spain
  - coordinates: 42.767213°N 3.433021°W
  - elevation: 570 m (1,870 ft)
- Length: 70 km (43 mi)

Basin features
- Progression: Ebro→ Balearic Sea
- Tributaries
  - left: Cerratón, Anguilas, Homino
  - right: Matapán

The Oca river is a short river, about 70 kilometres (43 mi) long, in the north of Spain. It is an affluent of the Ebro river that flows through the province of Burgos. It begins in the Sistema Ibérico range and flows north through the municipalities of Rábanos, Villafranca Montes de Oca, Valle de Oca, Alcocero de Mola, Prádanos de Bureba, Briviesca, Vileña, the shire of Bureba and Oña.

The Oca River rises in the comarca of Montes de Oca, near the town of Rábanos. Near its source, the river passes through the narrow, rock-lined gorge of La Hoz. This passage, 700 metres (2,300 ft) long and 100 metres (330 ft) high, was of great strategic value in the 11th century and was defended by the castle of Alba.

== Affluents ==
From the right, the Oca receives the waters of the river Matapán and the streams Valsorda and Penches, while on the left it receives the waters of the rivers Cerratón, Anguilas and Homino, and the streams Valdazo and Hoyo.

== See also ==
- Province of Burgos
- Montes de Oca (comarca)
- Oca River, Biscay
