= Fuentemolinos Cave =

Coordinates: 42°22′28″N 3°14′42″W

The Fuentemolinos Cave (Spanish: Cueva de Fuentemolinos) is the largest formation in a cave complex, consisting of at least twelve cavities, in the town of Puras de Villafranca belonging to the municipality of Belorado (Burgos, Spain).

It has been mapped within recorded a total of 4086 meters.

Its current visit is regulated and is the subject of adventure travel.
