= Redecilla =

Redecilla may refer to the following places in Spain:

- Redecilla del Camino
- Redecilla del Campo
