= Arraya =

Arraya may be:

- a Basque toponym
  - Arraia-Maeztu
  - Arraya de Oca
- a Spanish (Basque) surname
  - Pablo Arraya
  - Laura Arraya
  - Juan José Arraya
  - Vicente Arraya
- Arabic الراية ar-raya (al-raya) "the flag":
  - the Black Standard in Muslim Messianism
  - Arraya 2, an office tower in Kuwait
