= Castildelgado =

Coordinates: 42°26′N 3°05′W

- Municipality and town
- Flag Coat of arms
- Interactive map of Castildelgado
- Country: Spain
- Autonomous community: Castile and León
- Province: Burgos
- Comarca: Montes de Oca

Area
  - Total: 5 km^{2} (1.9 sq mi)
- Elevation: 770 m (2,530 ft)

Population (2025-01-01)
  - Total: 34
  - Density: 6.8/km^{2} (18/sq mi)
- Time zone: UTC+1 (CET)
  - Summer (DST): UTC+2 (CEST)
- Postal code: 09259
- Website: http://www.castildelgado.es/

Castildelgado is a municipality and town located in the province of Burgos, Castile and León, Spain. According to the 2004 census (INE), the municipality has a population of 70 inhabitants.

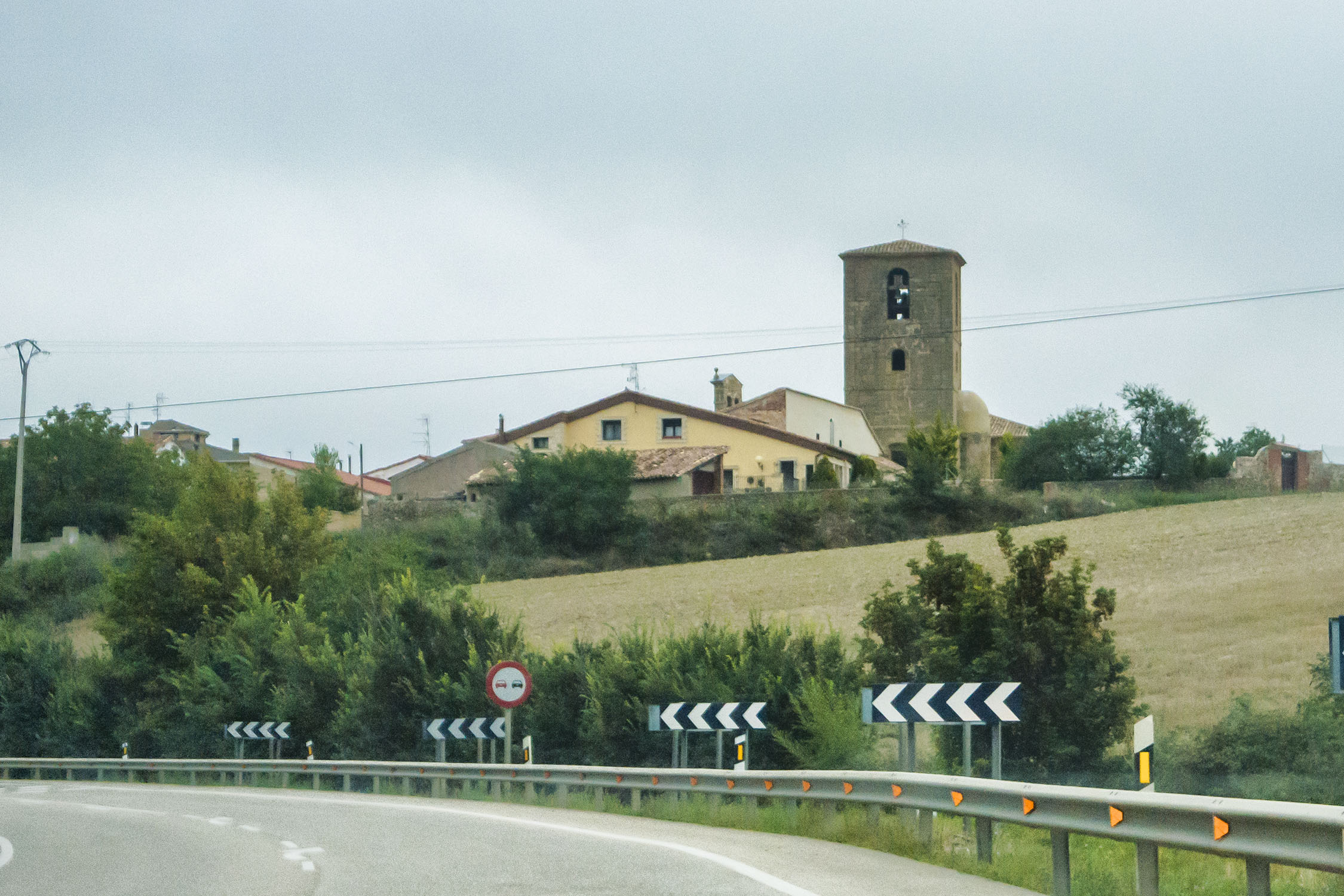
View of Castildelgado from the N-120
