= San Vicente del Valle =

Coordinates: 42°20′N 3°10′W

- Municipality and hamlet
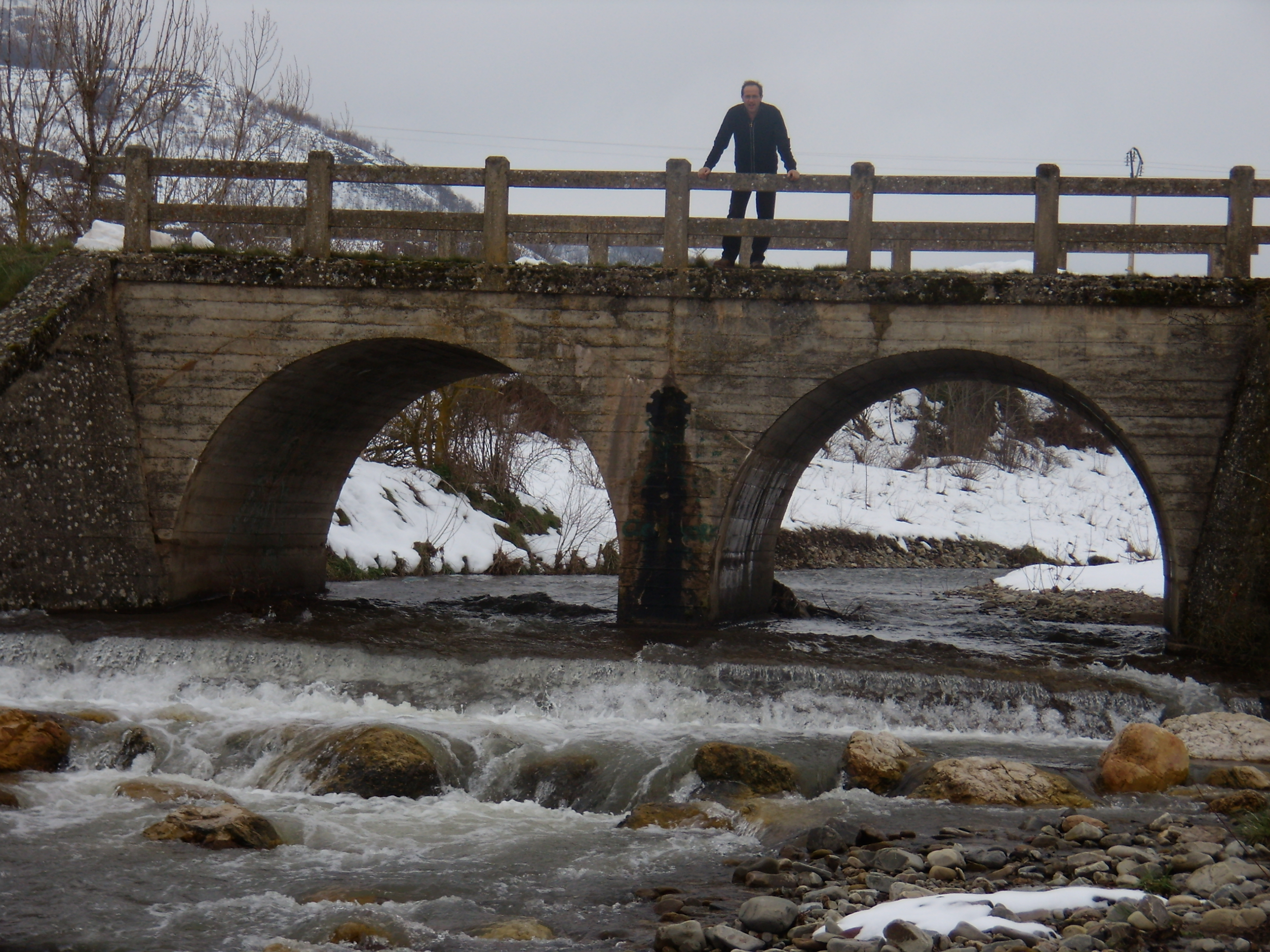
- Bridge over Tirón River

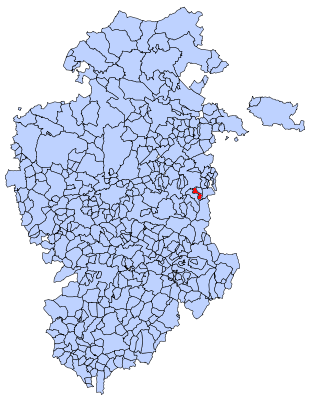
- Municipal location of San Vicente del Valle in Burgos province
- Country: Spain
- Autonomous community: Castile and León
- Province: Burgos
- Comarca: Montes de Oca

Area
  - Total: 13.42 km^{2} (5.18 sq mi)
- Elevation: 954 m (3,130 ft)

Population (2025-01-01)
  - Total: 26
  - Density: 1.9/km^{2} (5.0/sq mi)
- Time zone: UTC+1 (CET)
  - Summer (DST): UTC+2 (CEST)
- Postal code: 09268
- Website: http://www.sanvicentedelvalle.es/ http://sanvicentedelvalle.burgos.es/

San Vicente del Valle is a municipality and hamlet located in the province of Burgos, Castile and León, Spain. The municipality is in the comarca of Sierra de la Demanda. In addition to the hamlet of San Vicente del Valle, since 1857 the municipality has included the hamlet of Espinosa del Monte.

== Geography ==
San Vicente del Valle is located in the valley of the headwaters of the Tirón River, south of the Montes de Ayago and north of the Sierra de la Demanda.

== History ==
The earliest archaeological remains that have been found are from the Middle Paleolithic. There is evidence in the municipality of Roman roads, both paving stones and mileposts, although most Roman structures were destroyed during the Visigoth invasion and initial occupation.

The earliest documentation for the hamlet of San Vicente del Valle is in the year 945 in records of the monastery of San Millan de la Cogolla as viam that vadit ad Vicentium. Latin for "the road that goes to Vicentium".

== Demographics ==
The peak population for San Vicente del Valle municipality was 476 in 1876. From the 1930 to the 1960 the municipality averaged around 240 inhabitants. The population decreased during the 1970s and 1980s reaching a low of 30 inhabitants in 13 households in 1991. In the decade since 2001, the population ranged between 34 (2001) and 52 (2004), with 45 inhabitants documented in the 2007 census, but recently the municipality had only 31 inhabitants in 2014.
