= Fresno de Río Tirón =

Coordinates: 42°27′41″N 3°10′26″W

- Municipality and town
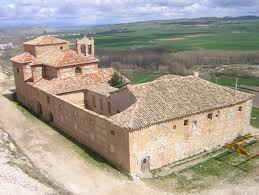
- San Vitores monastery (15th century)

- Flag Coat of arms

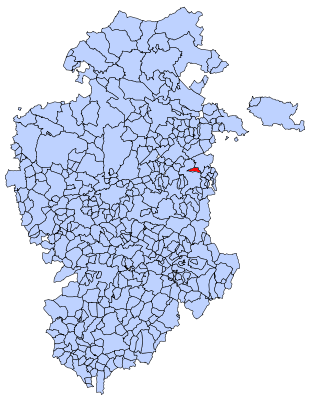
- Municipal location of Fresno de Río Tirón in Burgos province
- Country: Spain
- Autonomous community: Castile and León
- Province: Burgos
- Comarca: Montes de Oca

Area
  - Total: 10 km^{2} (3.9 sq mi)
- Elevation: 703 m (2,306 ft)

Population (2025-01-01)
  - Total: 156
  - Density: 16/km^{2} (40/sq mi)
- Time zone: UTC+1 (CET)
  - Summer (DST): UTC+2 (CEST)
- Postal code: 09272
- Website: http://www.fresnoderiotiron.es/

Fresno de Río Tirón is a municipality located in the province of Burgos, Castile and León, Spain. According to the 2004 census (INE), the municipality has a population of 221 inhabitants.
