= Ibrillos =

- Municipality and town
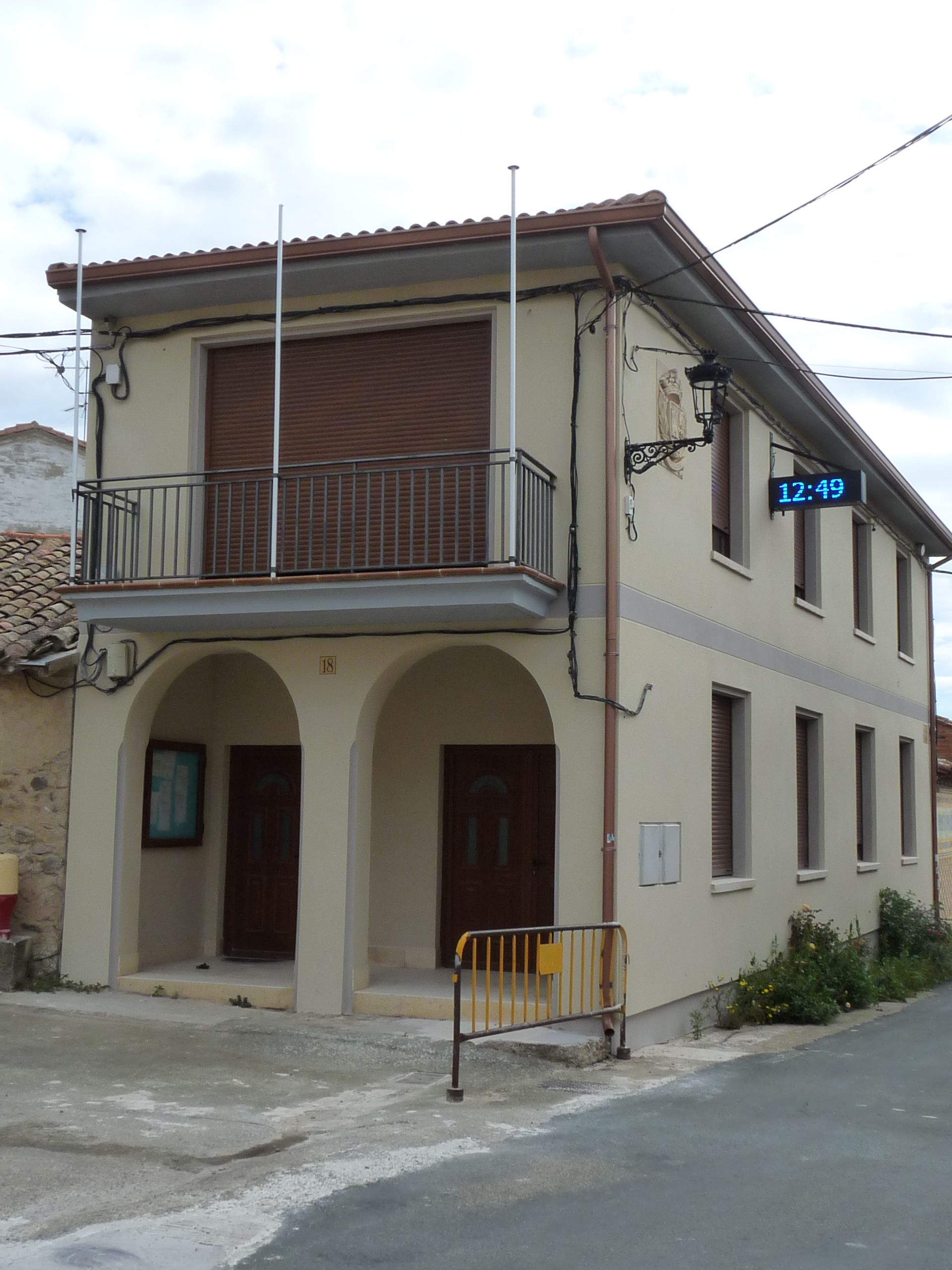
- Town hall

- Coat of arms

- Location within Castile and León Location within Spain
- Coordinates: 42°27′N 3°05′W
- Country: Spain
- Autonomous community: Castile and León
- Province: Burgos
- Comarca: Montes de Oca

Area
  - Total: 6 km^{2} (2.3 sq mi)
- Elevation: 730 m (2,400 ft)

Population (2025-01-01)
  - Total: 30
  - Density: 5.0/km^{2} (13/sq mi)
- Time zone: UTC+1 (CET)
  - Summer (DST): UTC+2 (CEST)
- Postal code: 09259
- Website: www.ibrillos.es

Ibrillos is a municipality located in the province of Burgos, Castile and León, Spain. According to the 2005 census (INE), the municipality has a population of 101 inhabitants.
