= Fresneña =

Coordinates: 42°25′N 3°08′W

- Municipality and town
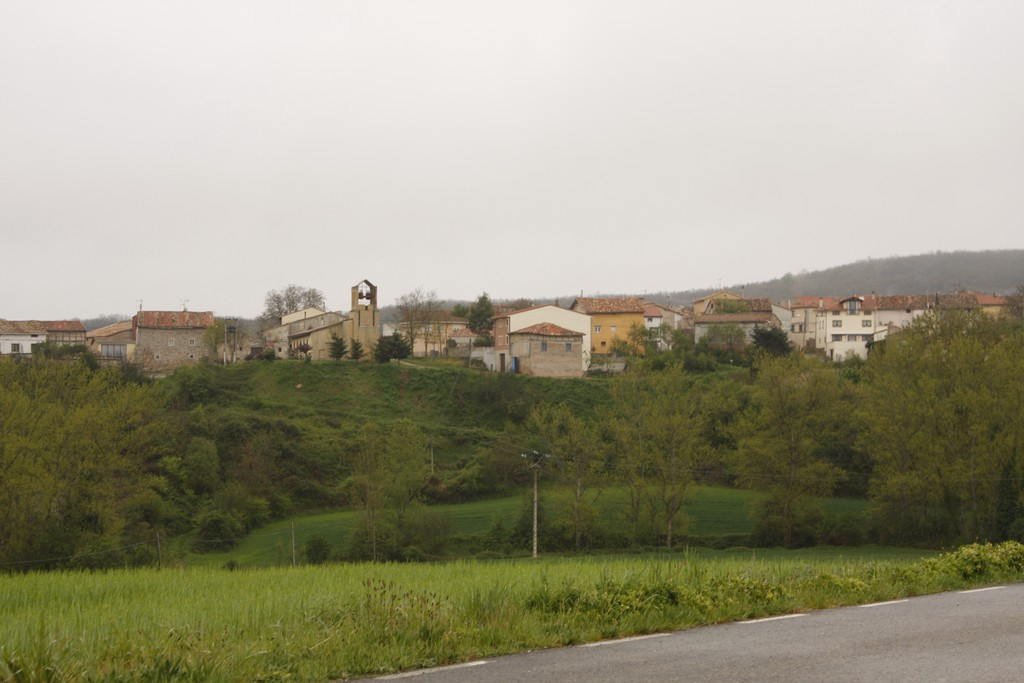
- View of Fresneña, 2010

- Coat of arms
- Interactive map of Fresneña
- Country: Spain
- Autonomous community: Castile and León
- Province: Burgos
- Comarca: Montes de Oca

Area
  - Total: 14 km^{2} (5.4 sq mi)
- Elevation: 845 m (2,772 ft)

Population (2025-01-01)
  - Total: 68
  - Density: 4.9/km^{2} (13/sq mi)
- Time zone: UTC+1 (CET)
  - Summer (DST): UTC+2 (CEST)
- Postal code: 09259
- Website: http://www.fresneña.es/

Fresneña is a municipality located in the province of Burgos, Castile and León, Spain. According to the 2004 census (INE), the municipality has a population of 105 inhabitants.
