= Bascuñana =

Coordinates: 42.417°N 3.083°W

- Municipality and town
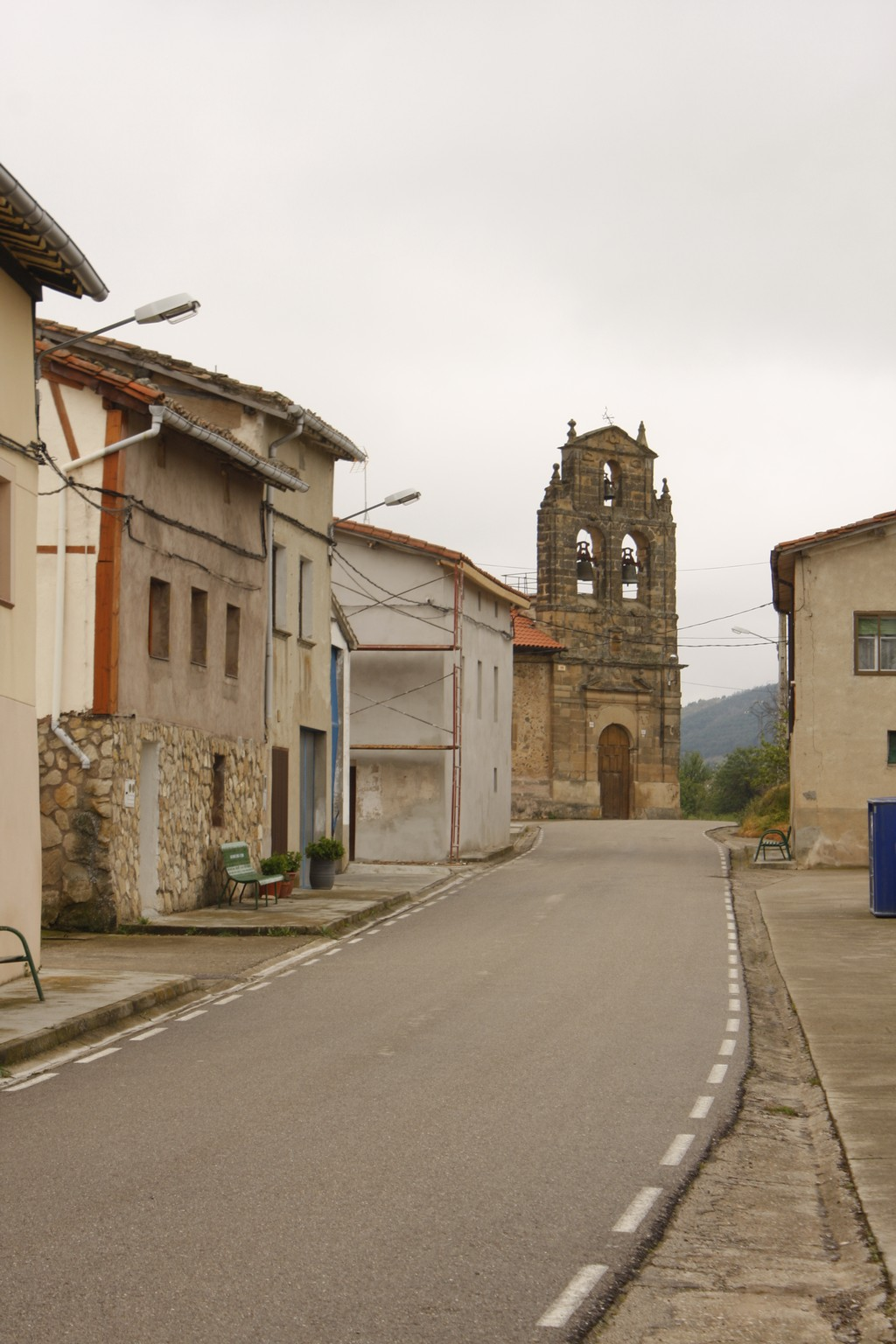
- View of Bascuñana, 2010
- Interactive map of Bascuñana
- Country: Spain
- Autonomous community: Castile and León
- Province: Burgos
- Comarca: Montes de Oca

Area
  - Total: 8 km^{2} (3.1 sq mi)
- Elevation: 801 m (2,628 ft)

Population (2025-01-01)
  - Total: 20
  - Density: 2.5/km^{2} (6.5/sq mi)
- Time zone: UTC+1 (CET)
  - Summer (DST): UTC+2 (CEST)
- Postal code: 09259

Bascuñana is a municipality and town located in the province of Burgos, Castile and León, Spain. According to the 2004 census (INE), the municipality has a population of 61 inhabitants.

The municipality of Bascuñana is made up of two towns: Bascuñana (seat or capital) and San Pedro del Monte.
