= Puras de Villafranca =

Village in Spain

Coordinates: 42°23′N 3°14′W

Puras de Villafranca, also known as Puras, is a village in the municipality of Belorado (Burgos, Spain) in the region of Montes de Oca, with historical links to Villafranca Montes de Oca.

Nearby is located the Fuentemolinos Cave.
