= Tosantos =

Coordinates: 42°25′N 3°14′W

- Municipality and town
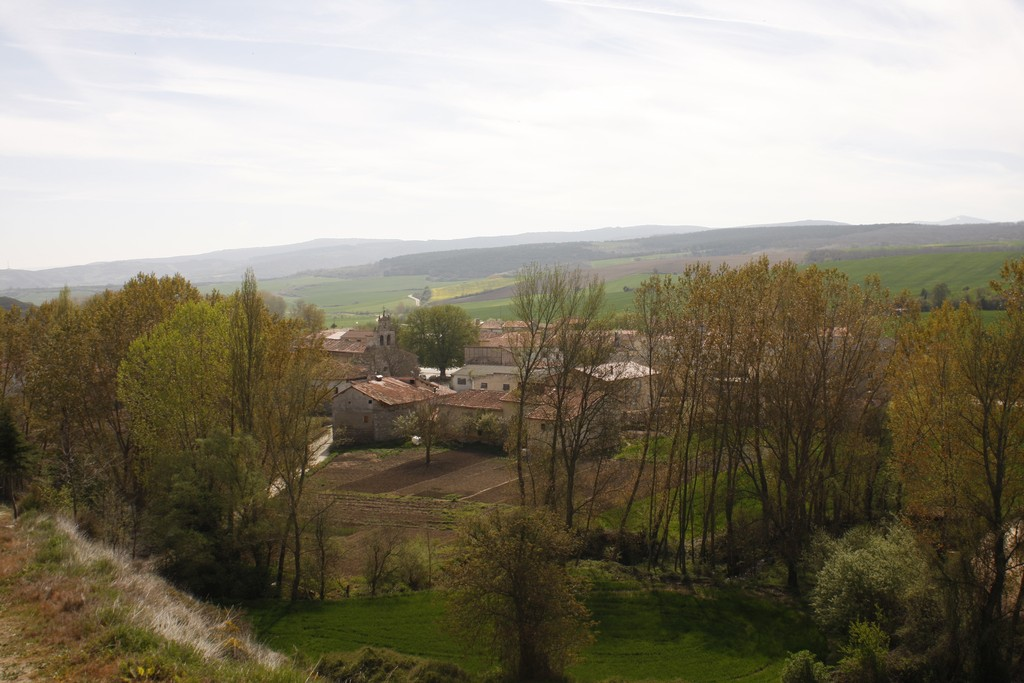
- View of Tosantos, 2010

- Flag Coat of arms

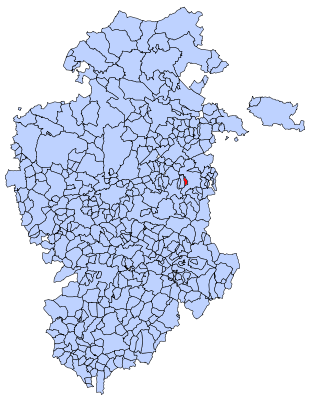
- Municipal location of Tosantos in Burgos province
- Country: Spain
- Autonomous community: Castile and León
- Province: Burgos
- Comarca: Montes de Oca

Area
  - Total: 5 km^{2} (1.9 sq mi)
- Elevation: 818 m (2,684 ft)

Population (2025-01-01)
  - Total: 48
  - Density: 9.6/km^{2} (25/sq mi)
- Time zone: UTC+1 (CET)
  - Summer (DST): UTC+2 (CEST)
- Postal code: 09258
- Website: http://www.tosantos.es/

Tosantos is a municipality and town located in the province of Burgos, Castile and León, Spain. According to the 2004 census (INE), the municipality has a population of 60 inhabitants. Tosantos is located on the Camino de Santiago de Compostela, a 1200-year-old pilgrimage route that runs through France and Northern Spain to the Spanish city of Santiago. The hamlet has a pilgrim hostel which is open from April through October and hosts up to 50 pilgrims a night.

800 years ago a woman, known as La Ermita, lived in a cave in the cliffs above Tosantos and ministered to the passing Pilgrims. A chapel has been built into that cave and once a year, on Fiesta day, the inhabitants of Tosantos hold a procession through the town, up the winding path to the cave and give thanks to God, Santa Maria and La Ermita for blessing the town.
