= Cerratón de Juarros =

Coordinates: 42°25′N 3°22′W

- Municipality and town
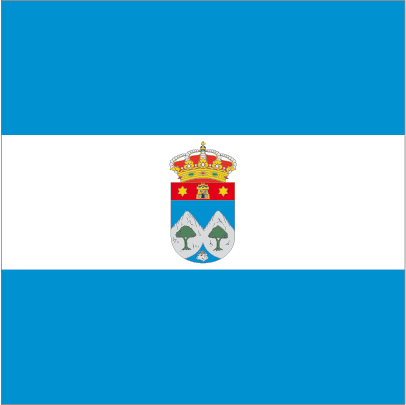
- Flag Coat of arms

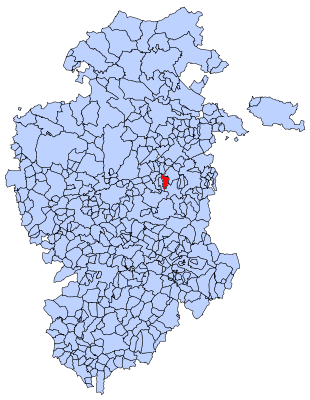
- Municipal location of Cerratón de Juarros in Burgos province
- Country: Spain
- Autonomous community: Castile and León
- Province: Burgos
- Comarca: Montes de Oca

Area
  - Total: 16 km^{2} (6.2 sq mi)
- Elevation: 988 m (3,241 ft)

Population (2025-01-01)
  - Total: 42
  - Density: 2.6/km^{2} (6.8/sq mi)
- Time zone: UTC+1 (CET)
  - Summer (DST): UTC+2 (CEST)
- Postal code: 09270
- Website: http://www.cerratondejuarros.es/

Cerratón de Juarros is a municipality located in the province of Burgos, Castile and León, Spain. According to the 2004 census (INE), the municipality has a population of 62 inhabitants.
