= Fresneda de la Sierra Tirón =

Coordinates: 42°19′N 3°08′W

- Municipality and town
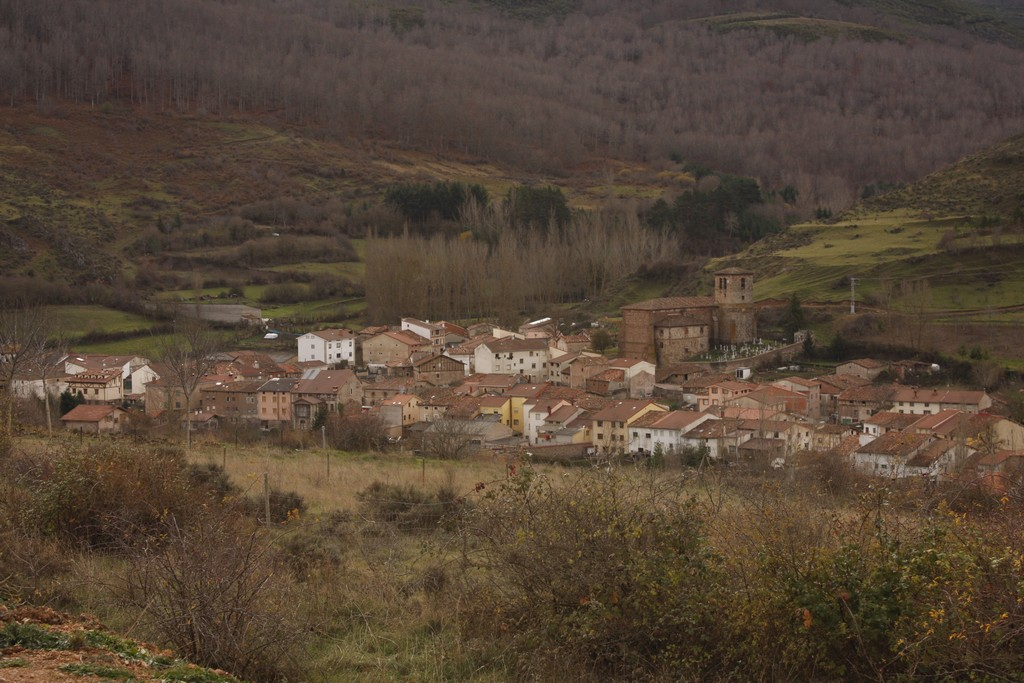
- View of Fresneda de la Sierra Tirón, 2009
- Interactive map of Fresneda de la Sierra Tirón
- Country: Spain
- Autonomous community: Castile and León
- Province: Burgos
- Comarca: Montes de Oca

Area
  - Total: 61 km^{2} (24 sq mi)
- Elevation: 989 m (3,245 ft)

Population (2025-01-01)
  - Total: 98
  - Density: 1.6/km^{2} (4.2/sq mi)
- Time zone: UTC+1 (CET)
  - Summer (DST): UTC+2 (CEST)
- Postal code: 09267
- Website: http://www.fresnedadelasierratiron.es/

Fresneda de la Sierra Tirón is a municipality located in the province of Burgos, Castile and León, Spain. According to the 2004 census (INE), the municipality has a population of 115 inhabitants.

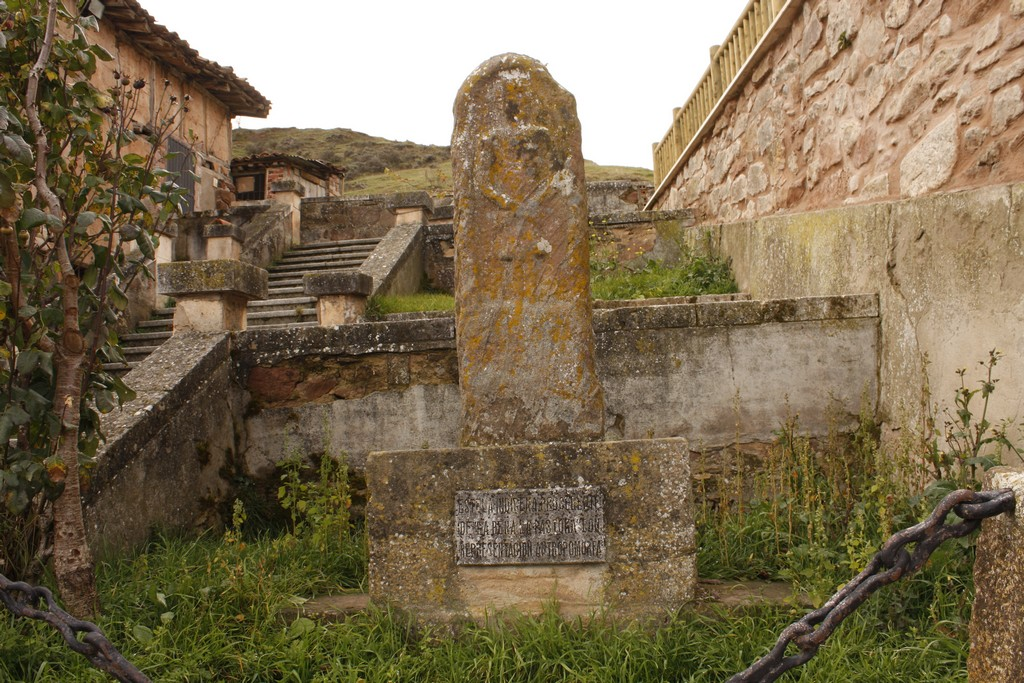
Indigenous stele (2nd-3rd century) in Fresneda
