= Valmala, Province of Burgos =

Valmala
- Municipality and town
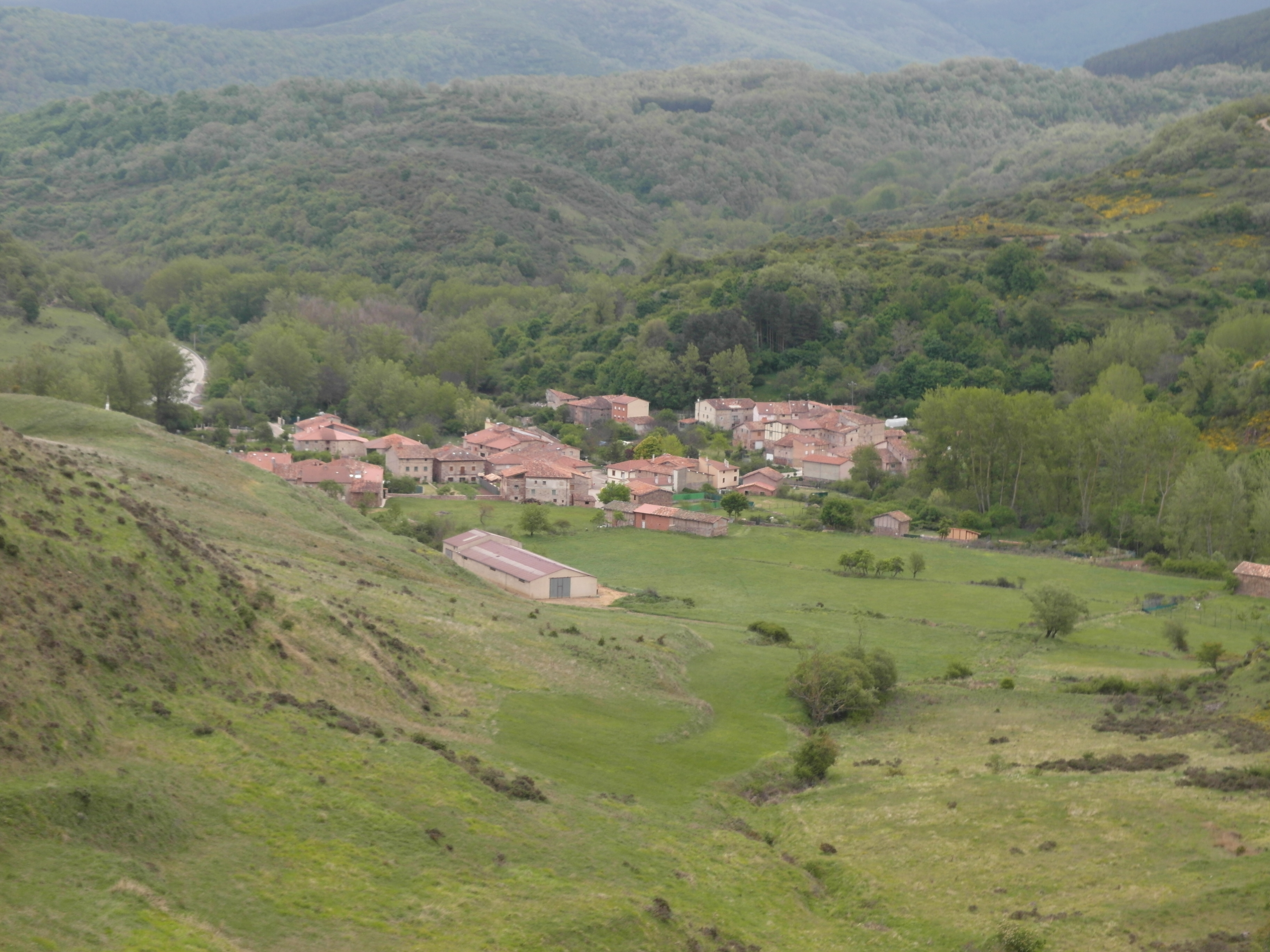
- View of Valmala, Burgos, Spain
- Interactive map of Valmala
- Coordinates: 42°18′19″N 3°15′18″W
- Country: Spain
- Autonomous community: Castile and León
- Province: Burgos
- Comarca: Montes de Oca

Area
  - Total: 17 km^{2} (6.6 sq mi)
- Elevation: 997 m (3,271 ft)

Population (2025-01-01)
  - Total: 24
  - Density: 1.4/km^{2} (3.7/sq mi)
- Time zone: UTC+1 (CET)
  - Summer (DST): UTC+2 (CEST)
- Postal code: 09269
- Website: http://www.valmala.es

Valmala is a municipality located in the province of Burgos, Castile and León, Spain. There is a Catholic church from the 13th century. It is located in Sierra de la Demanda.
