= Villalbos =

Coordinates: 42°26′40″N 3°19′47″W

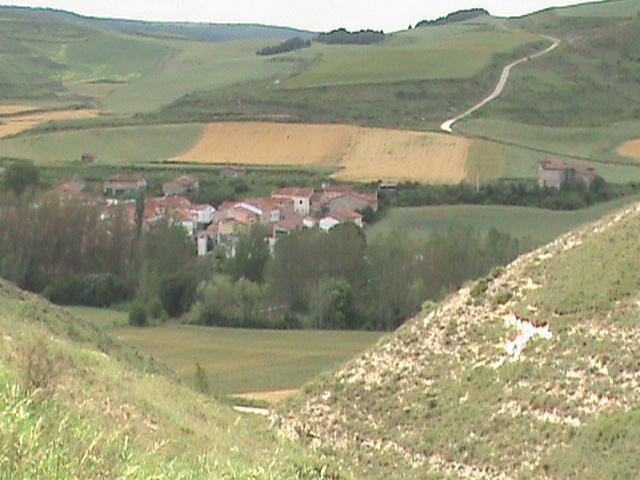
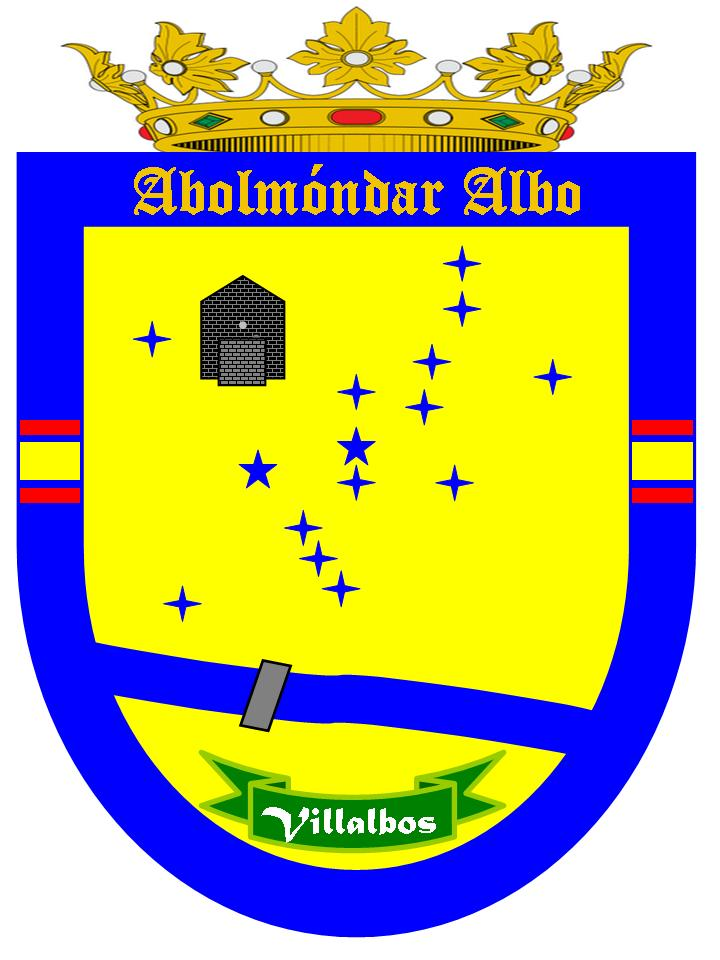
Villalbos Village
View	Villalbos
Province	Burgos
Autonomous community	Castilla y León
Postal code	09258
Coordinates: Latitude: Longitude:	42°46' N 3º19' W
Altitude	860 m
Area	km^{2}
Distances	17 km to Belorado; 39 km to Burgos
Population: Total (census of 2007); Density	25 inhabitants inhabitants/km^{2}
Demonym	Villalbés
River	Oca
Mayor (2007- )	Isabel Bonilla Calleja (Partido Popular)

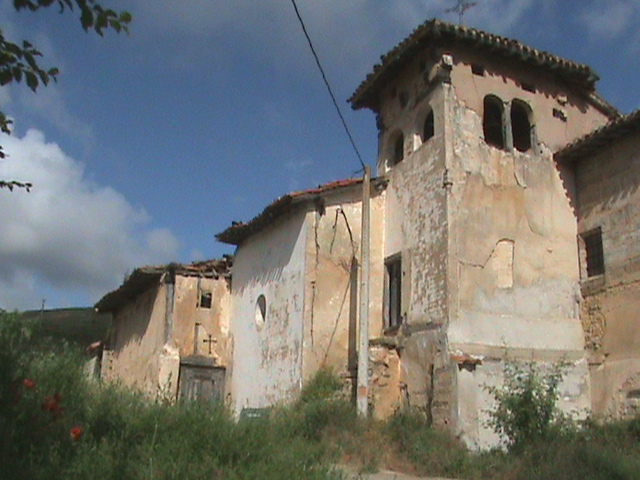
Church of Villalbos (1986)

Villalbos is a small village in the north-east of Burgos Province, autonomous community of Castilla-Leon (Spain).

== Geography ==
Villalbos is located in the left border of Oca River that leads to Ebro river.

Wikimapia\Coordenadas: 42°26'40"N 3°19'47"W

== History ==
At the beginning of the 10th century a Castilian count, don Rodrigo Díaz, known as "Abolmondar Albo" in the mozarabic world, founded a settlement next to the Oca river. From those settlements came the actual towns of Villalmondar (Abolmondar) and Villalbos (Albos).

== Photo gallery ==
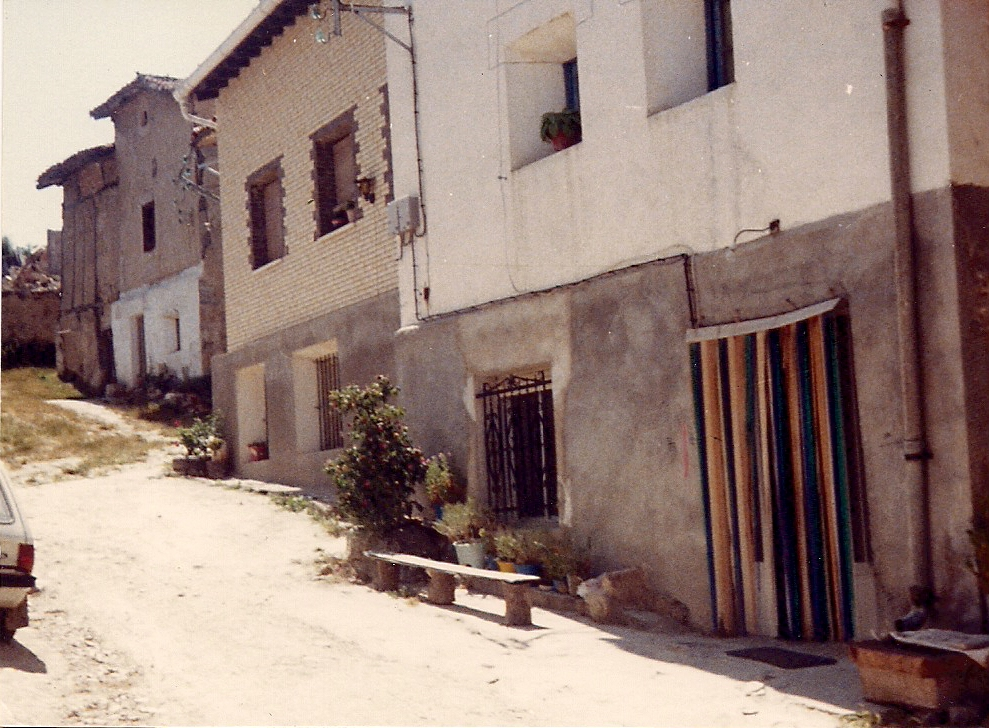
La Flor str. (1986)

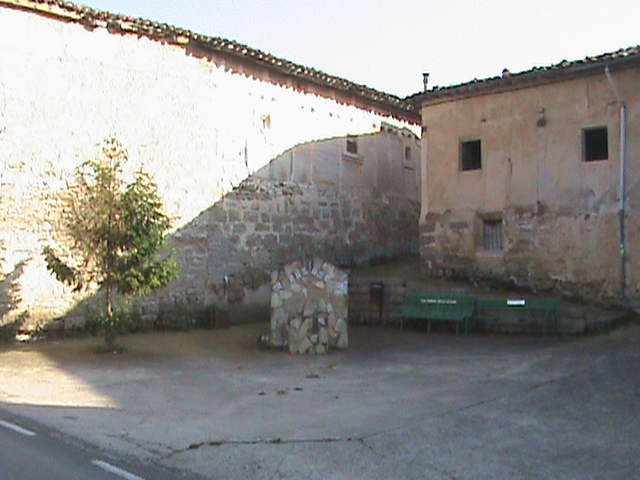
Saint Thomas Square (2008)

== Church ==
The Catholic Church of Saint Thomas Apostle was built in the past but it still keeps the Bell's Tower, the main Latin cross plant and the cemetery.

== Demography ==
Demography evolution
1842	1857	1860	1877	1887	1897	1900	1910	1920	2007
109	153	169	124	116	126	120	133	129	25
