= Redecilla del Campo =

Coordinates: 42°28′N 3°07′W

- Municipality and town
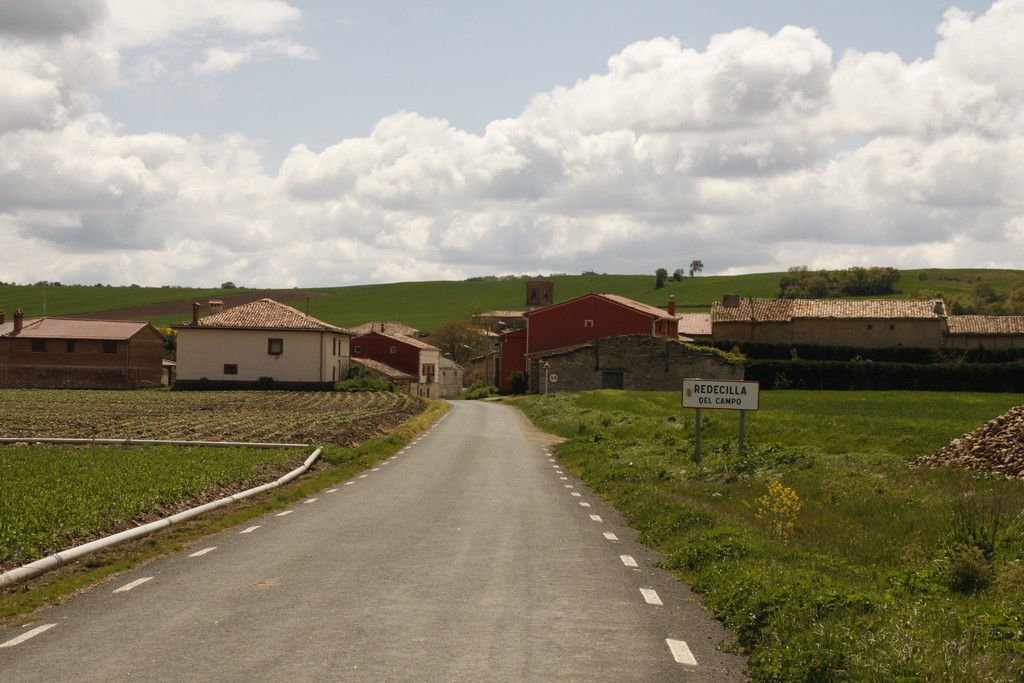
- View of Redecilla del Campo, 2010
- Interactive map of Redecilla del Campo
- Country: Spain
- Autonomous community: Castile and León
- Province: Burgos
- Comarca: Montes de Oca

Area
  - Total: 17.20 km^{2} (6.64 sq mi)
- Elevation: 755 m (2,477 ft)

Population (2025-01-01)
  - Total: 65
  - Density: 3.8/km^{2} (9.8/sq mi)
- Time zone: UTC+1 (CET)
  - Summer (DST): UTC+2 (CEST)
- Postal code: 09270
- Website: http://www.redecilladelcampo.es/

Redecilla del Campo is a municipality and town located in the province of Burgos, Castile and León, Spain. According to the 2004 census (INE), the municipality has a population of 79 inhabitants.
