= Province of Burgos =

Province of northern Spain

Province of Burgos Provincia de Burgos
- Province
- Flag Coat of arms

- Location of the Province of Burgos in Spain
- Coordinates: 42°23′N 3°40′W
- Country: Spain
- Autonomous community: Castile and León
- Capital: Burgos
- Municipalities: 371 (list)

Government
  - Type: Diputación
  - Body: Provincial Deputation of Burgos
  - President: Borja Suárez Pedrosa (PP)

Area
  - Total: 14,288.63 km^{2} (5,516.87 sq mi)
  - Rank: 11th in Spain
- 2.8% of Spain
- Highest elevation (Pico San Millán): 2,131 m (6,991 ft)
- Lowest elevation (Ayega River): 150 m (490 ft)

Population (2025)
  - Total: 362,663
  - Rank: 36th in Spain
  - Density: 25.3812/km^{2} (65.7371/sq mi)
- 0.7% of Spain
- Demonym(s): Burgalese, burgalés/a
- ISO 3166 code: ES-BU
- Website: www.burgos.es

The Province of Burgos (Spanish: Provincia de Burgos [ˈbuɾɣos]) is a province of northern Spain, in the northeastern part of the autonomous community of Castile and León. It has a population of 362,663 in an area of 14,288.63 square kilometres (5,516.87 sq mi) across its 371 municipalities—the highest number of municipalities of any Spanish province.

The capital and largest city is Burgos, while other important urban centres include Miranda de Ebro and Aranda de Duero. It is bordered by the autonomous communities of Cantabria, the Basque Country (provinces of Biscay and Álava), and La Rioja, as well as by the provinces of Soria, Segovia, Valladolid, and Palencia, all within Castile and León. Together with Zaragoza, it is the Spanish province that borders the highest number of other provinces, with a total of eight.

The province has a diverse landscape and is crossed by two of the main river basins of the Iberian Peninsula: the Ebro in the north and the Douro in the south. Its territory includes mountainous and wooded areas such as the Iberian System in the southeast, including Pico San Millán, the highest peak in the province, and the Cantabrian Mountains in the north, as well as extensive plains and agricultural lands, with cereal farming in areas such as La Bureba and Odra-Pisuerga, alongside vineyards in the Ribera del Duero and Arlanza wine regions.

The province has significant historical importance, as it was a key territory in the formation of the Kingdom of Castile, and the city of Burgos served as an early capital. It is home to three UNESCO World Heritage Sites: the Archaeological Site of Atapuerca, which contains some of the oldest human remains in Europe; the Burgos Cathedral, a Gothic masterpiece; and the Camino de Santiago, one of the most important pilgrimage routes in Europe. Burgos is also rich in cultural and architectural heritage, with numerous monasteries, castles, and historic towns distributed throughout the province. In addition, the Cartularies of Valpuesta, from the burgalese monastery of Santa María de Valpuesta, are considered to be among the oldest known documents containing words written in the Spanish language.

== Etymology ==
The name of the province derives from that of its capital, the city of Burgos, and therefore shares the same etymological origin. There are several possible origins for the toponymy. When the city was founded, the inhabitants of the surrounding country moved into the fortified village, whose Visigothic name of Burgos signified consolidated walled villages (Gothic baurgs). The cities Burgas in Bulgaria and numerous cities containing the Germanic burg "city" such as Hamburg have a similar literal composition. The city began to be called Caput Castellae ("Cabeza de Castilla" or "Head of Castile").

== Overview ==
Since 1964, archaeologists have been working at numerous areas of the Archaeological Site of Atapuerca, where they have found ancient hominid and human remains, the former dating to more than one million years ago, with artefacts from the Palaeolithic and Bronze Ages of man. The site has been designated a UNESCO World Heritage Site.

Transportation is developed through a wide net of highways and roads. Besides, the province is served by the Burgos Airport, and The High-speed rail AVE.

== Geography ==
Map of the relief of the province of Burgos.

The province of Burgos is located in the northern part of the Iberian Peninsula and forms part of the autonomous community of Castile and León. It borders the provinces of Palencia and Valladolid to the west and southwest, Segovia and Soria to the south and southeast, and La Rioja to the east. To the north it borders the autonomous communities of Cantabria and the Basque Country. With an area of approximately 14,289 km² (5,517 sq mi), its territory occupies a transitional position between the Northern Meseta, the Cantabrian Mountains and the Iberian System.

=== Relief ===
The province of Burgos has highly varied relief. Its landscape includes extensive areas of the Northern Meseta, elevated limestone plateaus and uplands, river valleys and basins, and several mountain ranges. The province is characterized by striking landscape contrasts.

Standing at 2,131 meters above sea level, Pico San Millán (also known as El Torruco) is the highest peak in the province, located in the Sierra de la Demanda range. However, despite holding the title for the highest elevation, it is not the most topographically prominent mountain in the province. That distinction belongs to Castro Valnera, a 1,718-meter peak situated in the Cantabrian Mountains on the border with Cantabria; due to its isolation from higher ridges, it features a significantly greater prominence of 866 meters, compared to the 319 meters of San Millán.

=== Hidrography ===
The Ebro in the Hoces de Sobrón.

The hydrographic network of Burgos is particularly distinctive, as it is the only province in Spain whose territory is divided between all three major hydrographic slopes of the Iberian Peninsula: the Cantabrian, Atlantic and Mediterranean slopes. The Douro and Ebro both cross the province, draining towards the Atlantic and Mediterranean respectively, while numerous important rivers have their sources within Burgos. In the Duero basin, these include the Odra, Arlanza, Arlanzón, Esgueva and Arandilla; in the Ebro basin, the Nela, Rudrón, Jerea, Oca and Tirón rise in the province. In the northwestern part of Burgos, the Cadagua and Ordunte also rise in the province and flow northwards towards the Bay of Biscay, forming part of the Cantabrian drainage slope. The province is also crossed by the Canal de Castilla, as well as by several smaller irrigation canals serving local agricultural areas.

Laguna Larga and Laguna Negra, part of the Neila Lakes complex.

Burgos also contains a number of notable natural water features. The Neila Lakes and Pozo Negro are glacial lakes associated with the high-mountain landscapes of the Sierra de la Demanda, which also contains various smaller glacial tarns, many of them seasonal. The province is also characterized by deeply incised river gorges and limestone canyons, notably the Hoces del Alto Ebro y Rudrón in northern Burgos and La Yecla gorge in the south, as well as the Burgos section of the Cañón del Río Lobos, which extends into the neighbouring province of Soria. The province also has numerous waterfalls, including the Salto del Nervión, the waterfalls of Orbaneja del Castillo, the Jerea waterfall at Pedrosa de Tobalina, and Las Pisas. Northern Burgos contains numerous springs and karstic features; among the best known is the Pozo Azul karstic spring at Covanera, while the Rudrón disappears underground at Basconcillos del Tozo before re-emerging at Barrio-Panizares.

The Úzquiza Reservoir on the Arlanzón River.

The province has several reservoirs, including part of the Ebro Reservoir, the Sobrón Reservoir, which is also shared with the neighbouring province of Álava, and the Alba Reservoir on the Oca, all belonging to the Ebro basin; the Arlanzón Reservoir and Úzquiza Reservoir on the Arlanzón River, and the Castrovido Reservoir on the Arlanza River, belonging to the Duero basin; and the Ordunte Reservoir on the Ordunte River, belonging to the Cantabrian drainage system. The reservoirs serve a variety of purposes, including water supply, irrigation, flow regulation and, in some cases, hydroelectric generation. The reservoirs are distributed across the Duero, Ebro and Cantabrian drainage systems, reflecting the division of the province among three major hydrographic slopes.

== History ==
Province of Burgos in 1590.

In the Atapuerca area, archaeologists have found evidence of occupation by hominids and humans for more than one million years. Discoveries have included the earliest hominid skull in Europe.

The Celtiberian region that became Burgos was inhabited by the Morgobos, Turmodigi, Berones and perhaps also the Pellendones, the last inhabitants of the northern part of the Celtiberian region. According to the Greek historian Ptolemy, the principal cities included: Brabum, Sisara, Deobrigula (nowadays Tardajos), Ambisna Segiasamon (Sasamón) and Verovesca (Briviesca). Under Roman colonization, it was part of Hispania Citerior ("Hither Spain") and then Hispania Tarraconensis.

In the fifth century, the Visigoths drove back the Suevi. In the eighth century, the Arabs occupied all of Castiles. Alfonso III the Great, king of León reconquered the area around the middle of the ninth century, and built many castles for the defence of Christendom. Gradually the area was reconquered. The region came to be known as Castile (Latin castella), i.e. "land of castles". In the eleventh century, Burgos became the capital of the Kingdom of Castile.

== Government and politics ==
The Province of Burgos was established by the Royal Decree of 30 November 1833, promoted by the minister Javier de Burgos as part of the territorial division of Spain. This division organized the country into provinces as part of the establishment of the modern Spanish administrative system.

=== Provincial government ===
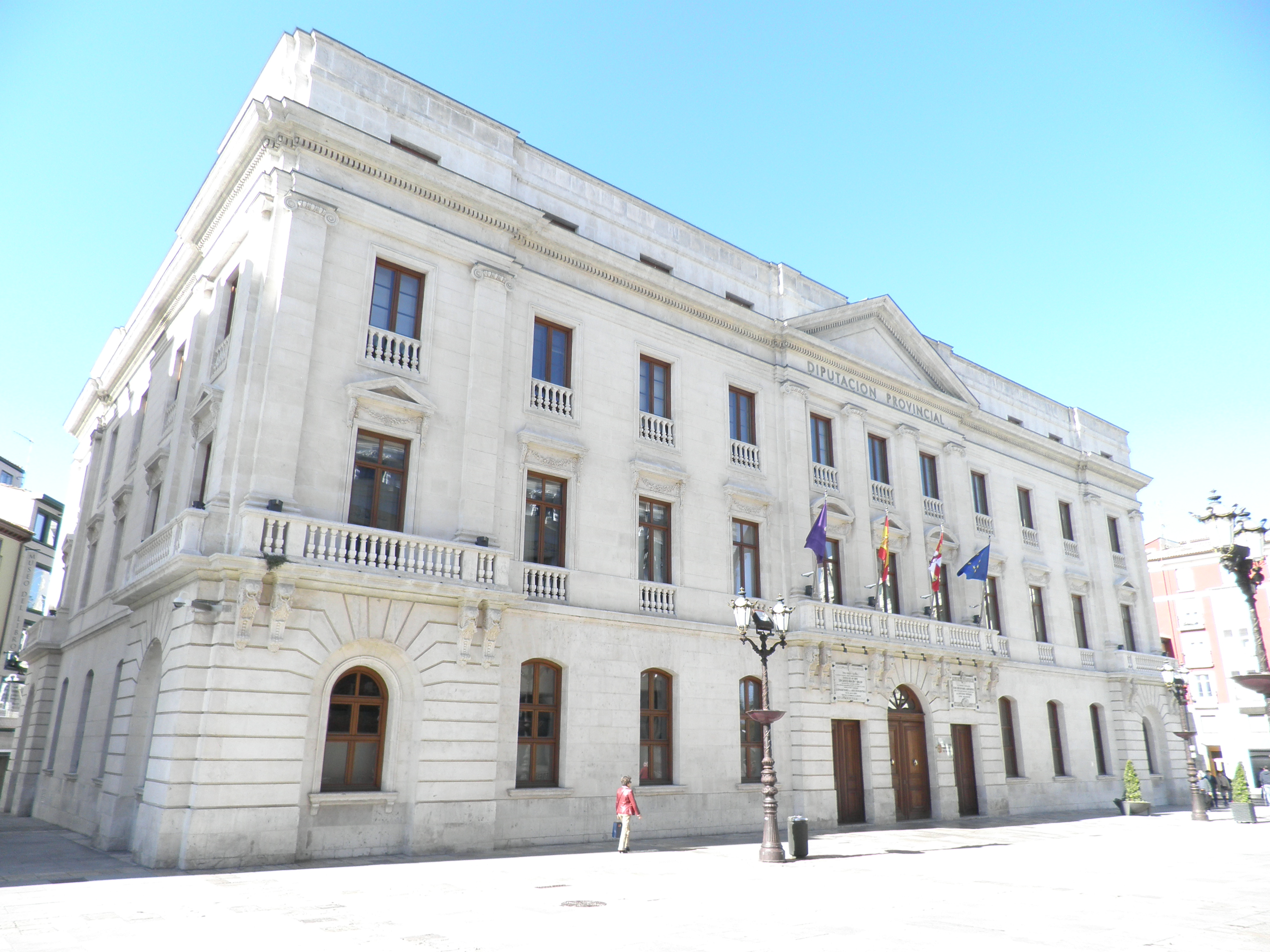
Provincial Palace of Burgos, headquarters of the Provincial Government.

The Provincial Deputation of Burgos (Diputación Provincial de Burgos) is the provincial government and administrative body of the Province of Burgos. Its main functions include providing and coordinating public services, supporting municipalities, particularly smaller ones, and managing matters within the provincial sphere, including infrastructure, social services, culture, and rural development. Its headquarters are located in the Provincial Palace of Burgos.

The Provincial Deputation is composed of 25 provincial deputies. Unlike municipal councillors, provincial deputies are not elected directly by voters; they are appointed indirectly following the results of the local elections, with the province's judicial districts serving as electoral constituencies for the distribution of seats.

The Plenary (Pleno) is the institution's main representative body. Following the 2023 Spanish local elections, its composition is:

Plenary of the Provincial Deputation
Political party	Votes	%	Seats
People's Party of Castile and León (PPCyL)	63,430	35.52%	13
Socialist Party of Castile and León (PSOECyL)	55,544	31.11%	9
Vox	16,380	9.17%	2
Sentir Aranda (SA)	4,118	2.30%	1

The president of the Provincial Deputation since 2023 is Borja Suárez Pedrosa, of the People's Party. The governing body also includes a Junta de Gobierno chaired by the president and composed of members of the provincial government group.

=== Political divisions ===
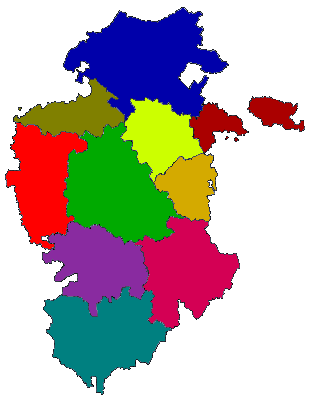
Comarcas of the province of Burgos.: Páramos Alfoz de Burgos Odra-Pisuerga Arlanza Ribera del Duero / Merindades Valle del Ebro La Bureba Montes de Oca Sierra de la Demanda

Today, the province does not have official political divisions, but historically it has been divided into several comarcas. The province of Burgos is divided in 10 comarcas (a Spanish term for shires).

- Las Merindades: occupies the northern third of the province of Burgos. It borders Cantabria to the west and northwest, the Basque province of Biscay to the northeast, Álava to the east, and the comarcas of Ebro, La Bureba, and Páramos to the south. Its capital is Villarcayo de Merindad de Castilla la Vieja. Geographically, it is characterized by a rugged, mountainous landscape that serves as a natural transition to the Cantabrian Range, encompassing both the Ojo Guareña cave system—one of the largest underwater and underground cave networks in the world— and the Salto del Nervión waterfall, the highest in the Iberian Peninsula. Historically and culturally, it possesses a rich medieval heritage showcased across its main centers—such as Medina de Pomar, Valle de Mena, Villarcayo, Espinosa de los Monteros, and Trespaderne—and features Frías, recognized as the smallest designated city in Spain. It comprises 26 municipalities, with 366 localities, and holds a total population of 21,951 inhabitants (INE 2024).
- Páramos, also known as Sedano y Las Loras, occupies the northwestern sector of the province of Burgos. It borders Las Merindades and the autonomous community of Cantabria to the north, the province of Palencia to the west, La Bureba to the east, and Odra-Pisuerga and Alfoz de Burgos to the south. Its capital is Sedano. Geologically part of the limestone plateaus, moorlands, and river canyons protected under Las Loras UNESCO Global Geoparque, this territory stands out for housing the Ayoluengo oil field, Spain's only historical onshore oil field. Historically, it suffers from severe rural depopulation, holding the record for the lowest population density in all of Spain (approx. 1.3/km² or 3.4/sq mi). It comprises 8 municipalities, with 55 localities, and holds a total population of 1,746 inhabitants (INE 2024).
- Ebro, also known as Valle de Ebro, occupies the far northeastern edge of the province of Burgos. It borders the Basque province of Álava to the north and east, the autonomous community of La Rioja to the south, and La Bureba to the west. Its capital is Miranda de Ebro. Geographically, it is characterized by its strategic river valley location, crossed from northwest to southeast by the Ebro River, and bounded by the Obarenes Mountains to the west. Historically and culturally, it is notable for its key role as an industrial and logistical crossroads between the Meseta, the Ebro Basin, and the Basque Country, and for encompassing the ancient and unique administrative enclave of Treviño. It comprises 10 municipalities, with 66 localities, and holds a total population of 39,212 inhabitants (INE 2024).
- La Bureba: occupies the northeastern area of the province of Burgos. It borders Las Merindades to the north, Ebro to the east, Montes de Oca to the south, and Páramos and Alfoz de Burgos to the west. Its capital is Briviesca. Geographically, it is characterized by a fertile agricultural depression watered by multiple streams flowing into the Ebro via the Oca, Tirón and Homino rivers, bordered to the northwest by the unique geological formation of the Poza de la Sal salt diapir, and to the east by the strategic gorge of Pancorbo. Historically and culturally, it is notable for being the ancient settlement of the pre-Roman Autrigones tribe, famously defined by the writer Azorín as 'the heart of the land of Burgos' and a miniature representative of the Castilian landscape. It comprises 44 municipalities, with 50 localities, and holds a total population of 10,117 inhabitants (INE 2024).
- Montes de Oca: occupies the eastern strip of the province of Burgos. It borders La Bureba to the north, the Sierra de la Demanda to the south, the autonomous community of La Rioja to the east, and Alfoz de Burgos to the west. Its capital is Belorado. Geographically, it transitions from a rugged mountain terrain covered in dense oak, beech, and pine forests in the southwest to the rolling agricultural landscape of La Riojilla Burgalesa to the northeast. Historically and culturally, it is notable for its connection to Jacobean history along the Camino de Santiago, and for the rich textile industrial heritage of Pradoluengo. It comprises 26 municipalities, with 35 localities, and holds a total population of 4,932 inhabitants (INE 2024).
- Alfoz de Burgos: occupies the geographic center of the province of Burgos. It is bordered to the north by Páramos and La Bureba, to the east by Montes de Oca and Sierra de la Demanda, to the south by Arlanza, and to the west by Odra-Pisuerga. Its capital is Burgos. Geographically, it is characterized by an open plateau basin centered around the Arlanzón River valley, transitioning from the northern Cantabrian foothills and eastern slopes of the Demanda range into the rolling cereal plains to the west and the rugged limestone plateaus to the south. Historically and culturally, it is notable for housing the UNESCO World Heritage sites of the Atapuerca Mountains and the Burgos Cathedral, and being traversed by the Camino de Santiago—as well as serving as the primary demographic, political, and industrial hub of the province. It comprises 59 municipalities, with 112 localities, and holds a total population of 203,243 inhabitants (INE 2024).
- Sierra de la Demanda, also known as La Demanda y Pinares, occupies the southeastern corner of the province of Burgos. It borders Alfoz de Burgos and Montes de Oca to the north, the autonomous community of La Rioja and the province of Soria to the east, Ribera del Duero to the south, and Arlanza to the west. Its capital is Salas de los Infantes. Geographically, it encompasses the burgalese southern slopes of the Sierra de la Demanda range—crowned by the rounded Pico San Millán, the highest peak in the province—and the upper valleys of the Arlanza and Arlanzón rivers, featuring prominent glacial lakes like the ones in Neila. Historically and culturally, it is notable for its traditional pine-gathering forestry culture, its Romanesque architecture, and its significant dinosaur footprint paleontological sites. It comprises 48 municipalities, with 24 localities, and holds a total population of 10,082 inhabitants (INE 2024).
- Odra-Pisuerga: occupies the western edge of the province of Burgos. It borders Páramos to the north, the province of Palencia to the west and southwest, Arlanza to the southeast, and Alfoz de Burgos to the east. Its capital is Villadiego. Geographically, it transitions from the rugged limestone cliffs of Peña Amaya in the north down to rolling cereal plains and fertile river valleys shaped by the Odra and Pisuerga rivers, and the historic Canal de Castilla to the west. Historically and culturally, it is notable for its rich rural Romanesque heritage, its traditional agricultural economy, and the Jacobean landmark of Castrojeriz along the Camino de Santiago. It comprises 45 municipalities, with 60 localities, and holds a total population of 8,941 inhabitants (INE 2024).
- Arlanza: occupies the central-southern territory of the province of Burgos. It borders Odra-Pisuerga and Alfoz de Burgos to the north, Sierra de la Demanda to the east, Ribera del Duero to the south, and the province of Palencia to the west. Its official capital is Lerma. Geographically, its landscape transitions from the rugged mountains, ancient juniper forests, and deep limestone canyon of La Yecla in the east, to open cereal plains and traditional vineyards in the west. Historically and culturally, it is renowned for its legendary medieval heritage, showcasing monumental towns like the ducal villa of Lerma and Santa María del Campo, the timber-framed village of Covarrubias, and the abbey of Santo Domingo de Silos. It comprises 54 municipalities, with 22 localities, and holds a total population of 9,167 inhabitants (INE 2024).
- Ribera del Duero: occupies the southernmost zone of the province of Burgos. It borders Arlanza and Sierra de la Demanda to the north, the province of Soria to the east, the province of Segovia to the south, and the provinces of Palencia and Valladolid to the west and southwest. Its capital is Aranda de Duero. Geographically, it is characterized by the wide sedimentary Douro River basin, transitioning from the modest Esgueva Valley in the north to the rugged limestone plateaus and the northern foothills of the Central System at its southern extreme. Historically and culturally, it is internationally renowned for the famous Ribera del Duero DO wine region, its medieval underground cellars, and the Roman ruins of the ancient city of Clunia, alongside monumental towns like Aranda de Duero, Peñaranda de Duero, and Roa de Duero. It comprises 65 municipalities, with 14 localities, and holds a total population of 50,324 inhabitants (INE 2024).

=== Municipalities ===
Map of municipalities in the province of Burgos.

The province of Burgos is divided into 371 municipalities, being the Spanish province with the highest number, although many of them have fewer than 100 inhabitants.

- Abajas
- Adrada de Haza
- Aguas Cándidas
- Aguilar de Bureba
- Albillos
- Alcocero de Mola
- Alfoz de Bricia
- Alfoz de Quintanadueñas
- Alfoz de Santa Gadea
- Altable
- Los Altos
- Ameyugo
- Anguix
- Aranda de Duero
- Arandilla
- Arauzo de Miel
- Arauzo de Salce
- Arauzo de Torre
- Arcos
- Arenillas de Riopisuerga
- Arija
- Arlanzón
- Arraya de Oca
- Atapuerca
- Los Ausines
- Avellanosa de Muñó
- Bahabón de Esgueva
- Los Balbases
- Baños de Valdearados
- Bañuelos de Bureba
- Barbadillo de Herreros
- Barbadillo del Mercado
- Barbadillo del Pez
- Barrio de Muñó
- Los Barrios de Bureba
- Barrios de Colina
- Basconcillos del Tozo
- Bascuñana
- Belbimbre
- Belorado
- Berberana
- Berlangas de Roa
- Berzosa de Bureba
- Bozoó
- Brazacorta
- Briviesca
- Bugedo
- Buniel
- Burgos
- Busto de Bureba
- Cabañes de Esgueva
- Cabezón de la Sierra
- Caleruega
- Campillo de Aranda
- Campolara
- Canicosa de la Sierra
- Cantabrana
- Carazo
- Carcedo de Bureba
- Carcedo de Burgos
- Cardeñadijo
- Cardeñajimeno
- Cardeñuela Riopico
- Carrias
- Cascajares de Bureba
- Cascajares de la Sierra
- Castellanos de Castro
- Castildelgado
- Castil de Peones
- Castrillo de la Reina
- Castrillo de la Vega
- Castrillo del Val
- Castrillo de Riopisuerga
- Castrillo Mota de Judíos
- Castrojeriz
- Cavia
- Cayuela
- Cebrecos
- Celada del Camino
- Cerezo de Río Tirón
- Cerratón de Juarros
- Ciadoncha
- Cillaperlata
- Cilleruelo de Abajo
- Cilleruelo de Arriba
- Ciruelos de Cervera
- Cogollos
- Condado de Treviño
- Contreras
- Coruña del Conde
- Covarrubias
- Cubillo del Campo
- Cubo de Bureba
- La Cueva de Roa
- Cuevas de San Clemente
- Encío
- Espinosa de Cervera
- Espinosa del Camino
- Espinosa de los Monteros
- Estépar
- Fontioso
- Frandovínez
- Fresneda de la Sierra Tirón
- Fresneña
- Fresnillo de las Dueñas
- Fresno de Río Tirón
- Fresno de Rodilla
- Frías
- Fuentebureba
- Fuentecén
- Fuentelcésped
- Fuentelisendo
- Fuentemolinos
- Fuentenebro
- Fuentespina
- Galbarros
- La Gallega
- Grijalba
- Grisaleña
- Gumiel de Izán
- Gumiel de Mercado
- Hacinas
- Haza
- Hontanas
- Hontangas
- Hontoria de la Cantera
- Hontoria del Pinar
- Hontoria de Valdearados
- Las Hormazas
- Hornillos del Camino
- La Horra
- Hortigüela
- Hoyales de Roa
- Huérmeces
- Huerta de Arriba
- Huerta de Rey
- Humada
- Hurones
- Ibeas de Juarros
- Ibrillos
- Iglesiarrubia
- Iglesias
- Isar
- Itero del Castillo
- Jaramillo de la Fuente
- Jaramillo Quemado
- Junta de Traslaloma
- Junta de Villalba de Losa
- Jurisdicción de Lara
- Jurisdicción de San Zadornil
- Lerma
- Llano de Bureba
- Madrigal del Monte
- Madrigalejo del Monte
- Mahamud
- Mambrilla de Castrejón
- Mambrillas de Lara
- Mamolar
- Manciles
- Mazuela
- Mecerreyes
- Medina de Pomar
- Melgar de Fernamental
- Merindad de Cuesta-Urria
- Merindad de Montija
- Merindad de Río Ubierna
- Merindad de Sotoscueva
- Merindad de Valdeporres
- Merindad de Valdivielso
- Milagros
- Miranda de Ebro
- Miraveche
- Modúbar de la Emparedada
- Monasterio de la Sierra
- Monasterio de Rodilla
- Moncalvillo
- Monterrubio de la Demanda
- Montorio
- Moradillo de Roa
- Nava de Roa
- Navas de Bureba
- Nebreda
- Neila
- Olmedillo de Roa
- Olmillos de Muñó
- Oña
- Oquillas
- Orbaneja Riopico
- Padilla de Abajo
- Padilla de Arriba
- Padrones de Bureba
- Palacios de la Sierra
- Palacios de Riopisuerga
- Palazuelos de la Sierra
- Palazuelos de Muñó
- Pampliega
- Pancorbo
- Pardilla
- Partido de la Sierra en Tobalina
- Pedrosa de Duero
- Pedrosa del Páramo
- Pedrosa del Príncipe
- Pedrosa de Río Úrbel
- Peñaranda de Duero
- Peral de Arlanza
- Piérnigas
- Pineda de la Sierra
- Pineda Trasmonte
- Pinilla de los Barruecos
- Pinilla de los Moros
- Pinilla Trasmonte
- Poza de la Sal
- Prádanos de Bureba
- Pradoluengo
- Presencio
- La Puebla de Arganzón
- Puentedura
- Quemada
- Quintanabureba
- Quintana del Pidio
- Quintanaélez
- Quintanaortuño
- Quintanapalla
- Quintanar de la Sierra
- Quintanavides
- Quintanilla de la Mata
- Quintanilla del Agua y Tordueles
- Quintanilla del Coco
- Las Quintanillas
- Quintanilla San García
- Quintanilla Vivar
- Rabanera del Pinar
- Rábanos
- Rabé de las Calzadas
- Rebolledo de la Torre
- Redecilla del Camino
- Redecilla del Campo
- Regumiel de la Sierra
- Reinoso
- Retuerta
- La Revilla y Ahedo
- Revilla del Campo
- Revillarruz
- Revilla Vallejera
- Rezmondo
- Riocavado de la Sierra
- Roa
- Rojas
- Royuela de Río Franco
- Rubena
- Rublacedo de Abajo
- Rucandio
- Salas de Bureba
- Salas de los Infantes
- Saldaña de Burgos
- Salinillas de Bureba
- San Adrián de Juarros
- San Juan del Monte
- San Mamés de Burgos
- San Martín de Rubiales
- San Millán de Lara
- Santa Cecilia
- Santa Cruz de la Salceda
- Santa Cruz del Valle Urbión
- Santa Gadea del Cid
- Santa Inés
- Santa María del Campo
- Santa María del Invierno
- Santa María del Mercadillo
- Santa María Ribarredonda
- Santa Olalla de Bureba
- Santibáñez de Esgueva
- Santibáñez del Val
- Santo Domingo de Silos
- San Vicente del Valle
- Sargentes de la Lora
- Sarracín
- Sasamón
- La Sequera de Haza
- Solarana
- Sordillos
- Sotillo de la Ribera
- Sotragero
- Sotresgudo
- Susinos del Páramo
- Tamarón
- Tardajos
- Tejada
- Terradillos de Esgueva
- Tinieblas de la Sierra
- Tobar
- Tordómar
- Torrecilla del Monte
- Torregalindo
- Torrelara
- Torrepadre
- Torresandino
- Tórtoles de Esgueva
- Tosantos
- Trespaderne
- Tubilla del Agua
- Tubilla del Lago
- Úrbel del Castillo
- Vadocondes
- Valdeande
- Valdezate
- Valdorros
- Valmala
- Vallarta de Bureba
- Valle de Losa
- Valle de Manzanedo
- Valle de Mena
- Valle de Oca
- Valle de Santibáñez
- Valle de Sedano
- Valle de Tobalina
- Valle de Valdebezana
- Valle de Valdelaguna
- Valle de Valdelucio
- Valle de Zamanzas
- Valle de las Navas
- Vallejera
- Valles de Palenzuela
- Valluércanes
- La Vid de Bureba
- La Vid y Barrios
- Vileña
- Villarcayo de Merindad de Castilla la Vieja
- Viloria de Rioja
- Vilviestre del Pinar
- Villadiego
- Villaescusa de Roa
- Villaescusa la Sombría
- Villaespasa
- Villafranca Montes de Oca
- Villafruela
- Villagalijo
- Villagonzalo Pedernales
- Villahoz
- Villalba de Duero
- Villalbilla de Burgos
- Villalbilla de Gumiel
- Villaldemiro
- Villalmanzo
- Villamayor de los Montes
- Villamayor de Treviño
- Villambistia
- Villamedianilla
- Villamiel de la Sierra
- Villangómez
- Villanueva de Argaño
- Villanueva de Carazo
- Villanueva de Gumiel
- Villanueva de Teba
- Villaquirán de la Puebla
- Villaquirán de los Infantes
- Villariezo
- Villasandino
- Villasur de Herreros
- Villatuelda
- Villaverde del Monte
- Villaverde-Mogina
- Villayerno Morquillas
- Villazopeque
- Villegas
- Villoruebo
- Vizcaínos
- Zael
- Zarzosa de Río Pisuerga
- Zazuar
- Zuñeda

=== Judicial districts ===
Map of the judicial districts of the province of Burgos.

Judicial districts (partidos judiciales) are territorial groupings of municipalities that serve a dual purpose: they organize the local administration of justice and serve as electoral constituencies for the election of provincial deputies to the Provincial Deputation of Burgos. Each district is assigned a number and named after its judicial seat.

- No. 1 Burgos (includes 108 municipalities; elects 15 provincial deputies)
- No. 2 Aranda de Duero (includes 56 municipalities; elects 3 provincial deputies)
- No. 3 Villarcayo de Merindad de Castilla la Vieja (includes 26 municipalities; elects 1 provincial deputy)
- No. 4 Miranda de Ebro (includes 14 municipalities; elects 3 provincial deputies)
- No. 5 Lerma (includes 52 municipalities; elects 1 provincial deputy)
- No. 6 Briviesca (includes 67 municipalities; elects 1 provincial deputy)
- No. 7 Salas de los Infantes (includes 48 municipalities; elects 1 provincial deputy)

== Demographics ==
As of 2025, the population is 362,663, of which 50.0% are male, and 50.0% are female. Minors make up 14.7% of the population, and seniors make up 25.6%.

Historical population

Year	Pop.	±%
1842	177,178	—
1857	333,356	+88.1%
1877	335,395	+0.6%
1887	342,988	+2.3%
1900	344,242	+0.4%
1910	351,759	+2.2%
1920	346,399	−1.5%
1930	360,613	+4.1%
1940	378,672	+5.0%

Year	Pop.	±%
1950	390,058	+3.0%
1960	388,115	−0.5%
1970	361,181	−6.9%
1981	363,523	+0.6%
1991	352,772	−3.0%
2001	348,934	−1.1%
2011	372,538	+6.8%
2021	356,042	−4.4%

Source: INE

=== Immigration ===
As of 2025, immigrants make up 14.4% of the population. The 5 largest foreign countries of birth are Colombia, Romania, Morocco, Venezuela, and Ecuador.

=== Most populous municipalities ===
Largest municipalities in the province of Burgos INE - 2025
Rank		Pop.	Rank		Pop.
1	Burgos	178,370	11	Salas de los Infantes	1,974
2	Miranda de Ebro	36,617	12	Villagonzalo Pedernales	1,901
3	Aranda de Duero	33,904	13	Belorado	1,830
4	Briviesca	6,711	14	Arcos de la Llana	1,819
5	Medina de Pomar	6,157	15	Espinosa de los Monteros	1,625
6	Valle de Mena	4,168	16	Villalbilla de Burgos	1,554
7	Villarcayo de Merindad de Castilla la Vieja	4,082	17	Melgar de Fernamental	1,505
8	Lerma	2,648	18	Ibeas de Juarros	1,504
9	Roa	2,305	19	Quintanar de la Sierra	1,476
10	Alfoz de Quintanadueñas	2,160	20	Condado de Treviño	1,472

Considering that the metropolitan area of Burgos has around 200,000 inhabitants, including municipalities such as Alfoz de Quintanadueñas, Villagonzalo Pedernales, and Arcos de la Llana, there is a strong concentration of population around the capital. Together with the urban areas of Burgos, Aranda de Duero, and Miranda de Ebro—accounting for over 75% of the provincial population—this creates a clear contrast with the province's rural areas. Much of the territory is affected by depopulation, with many small municipalities having very low population levels, often below 100 inhabitants.

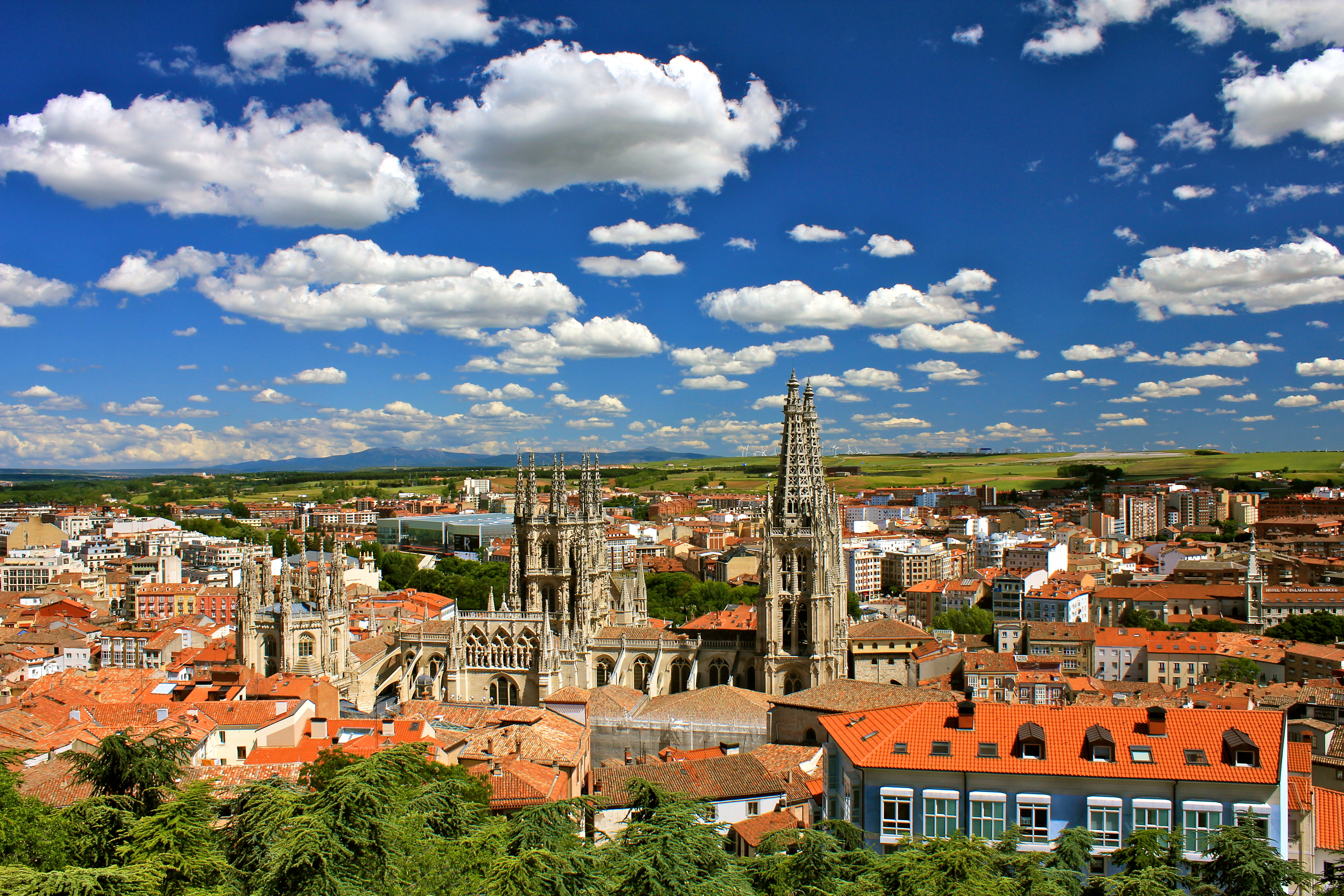
Burgos

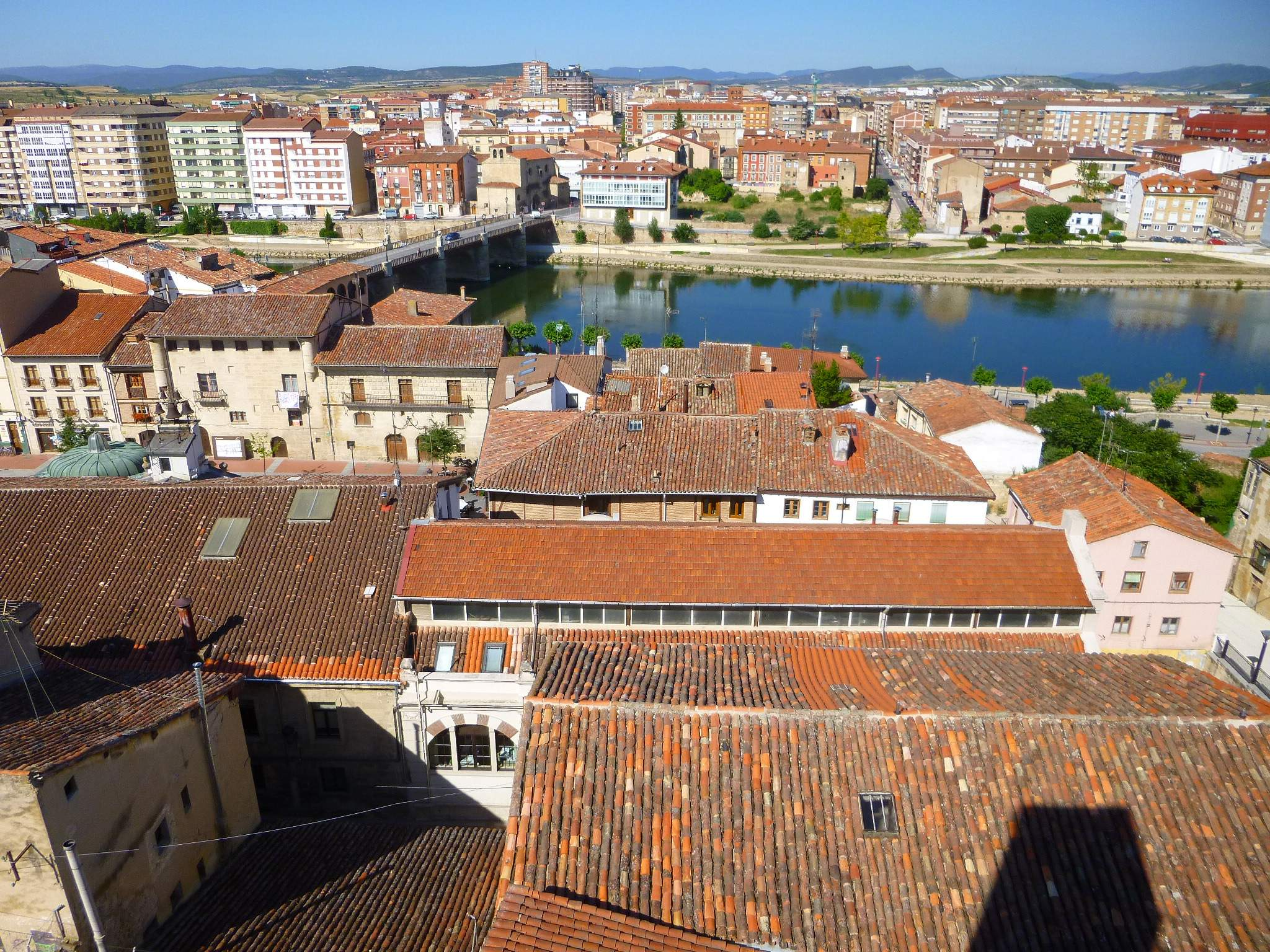
Miranda de Ebro

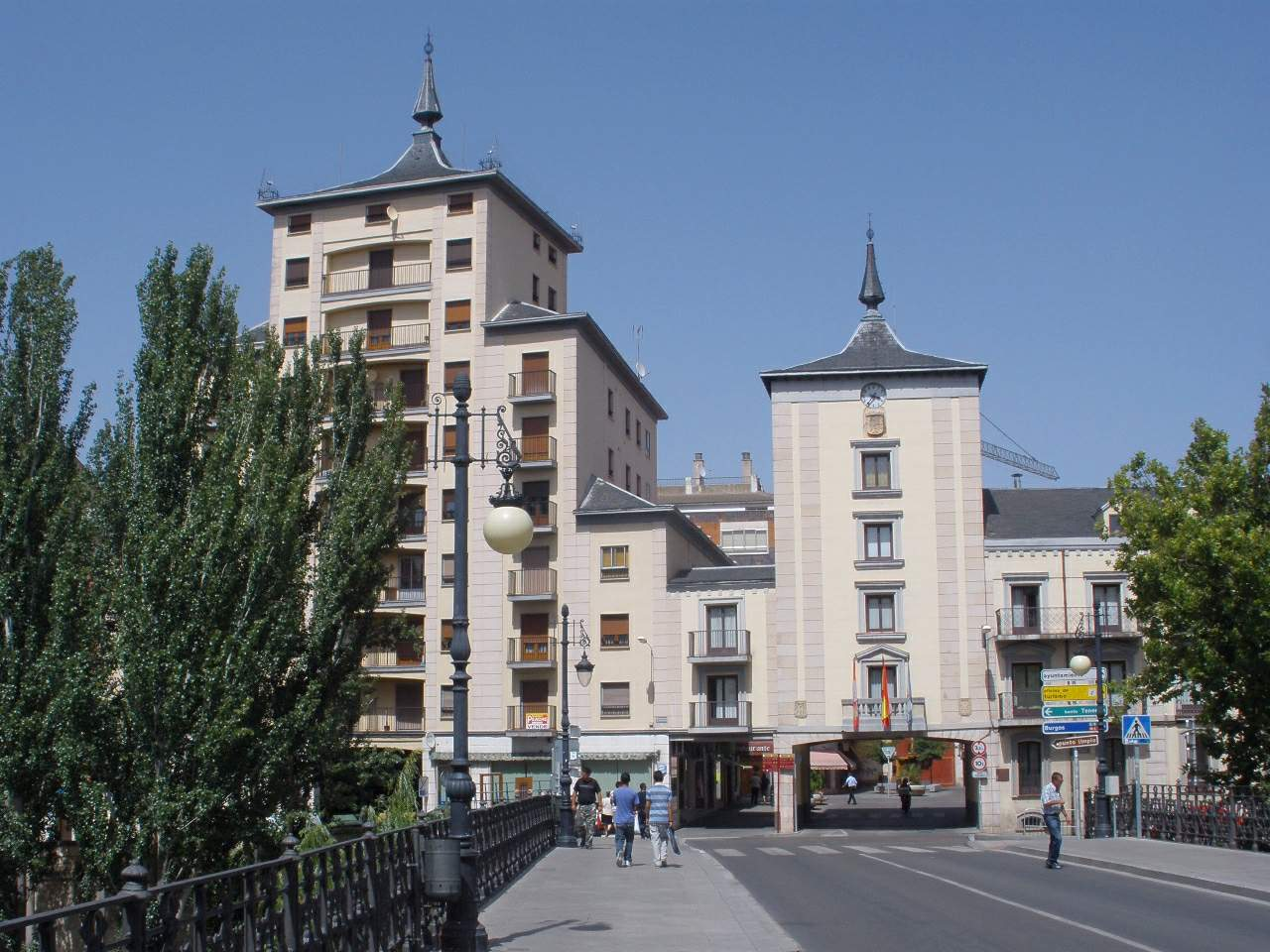
Aranda de Duero

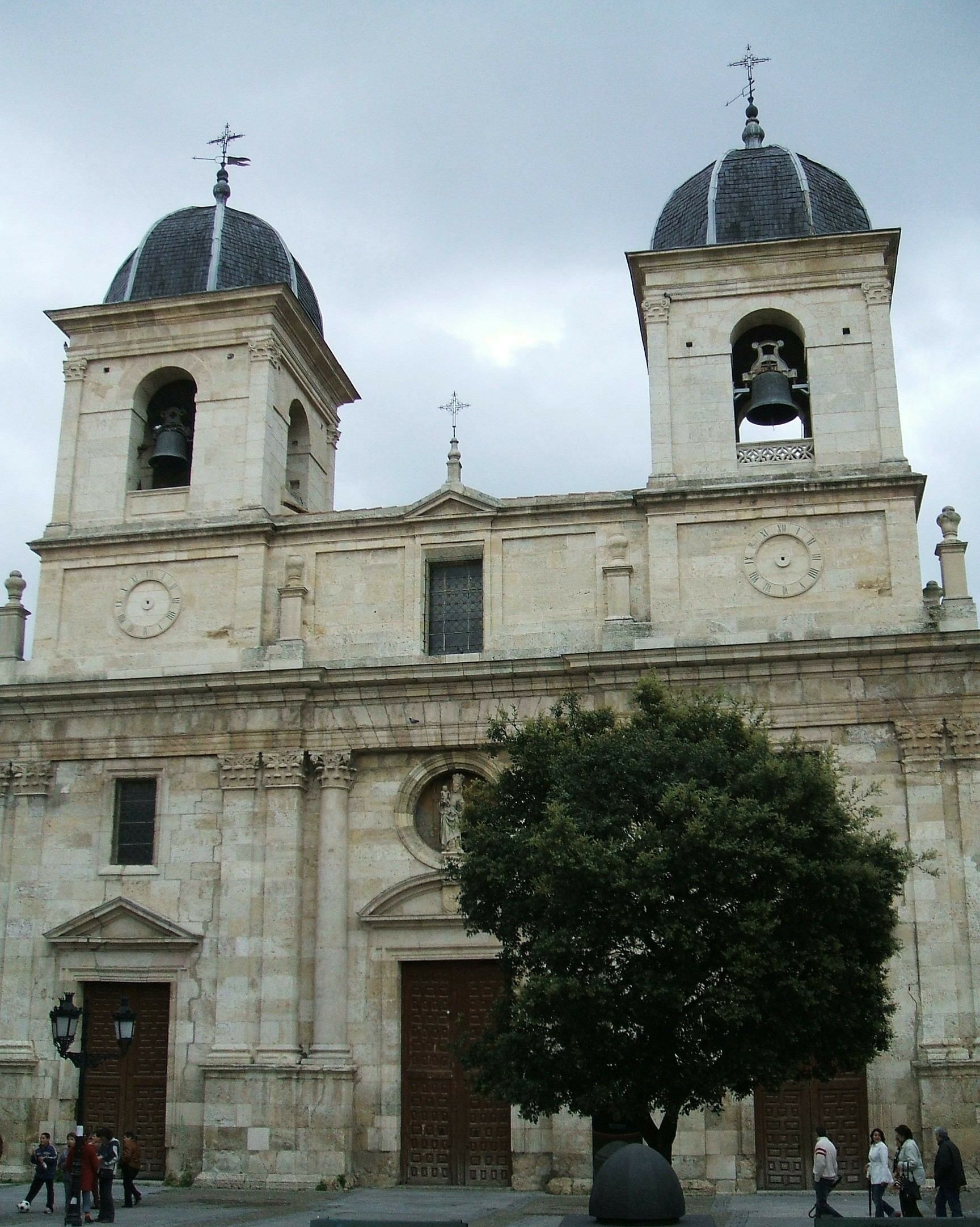
Briviesca

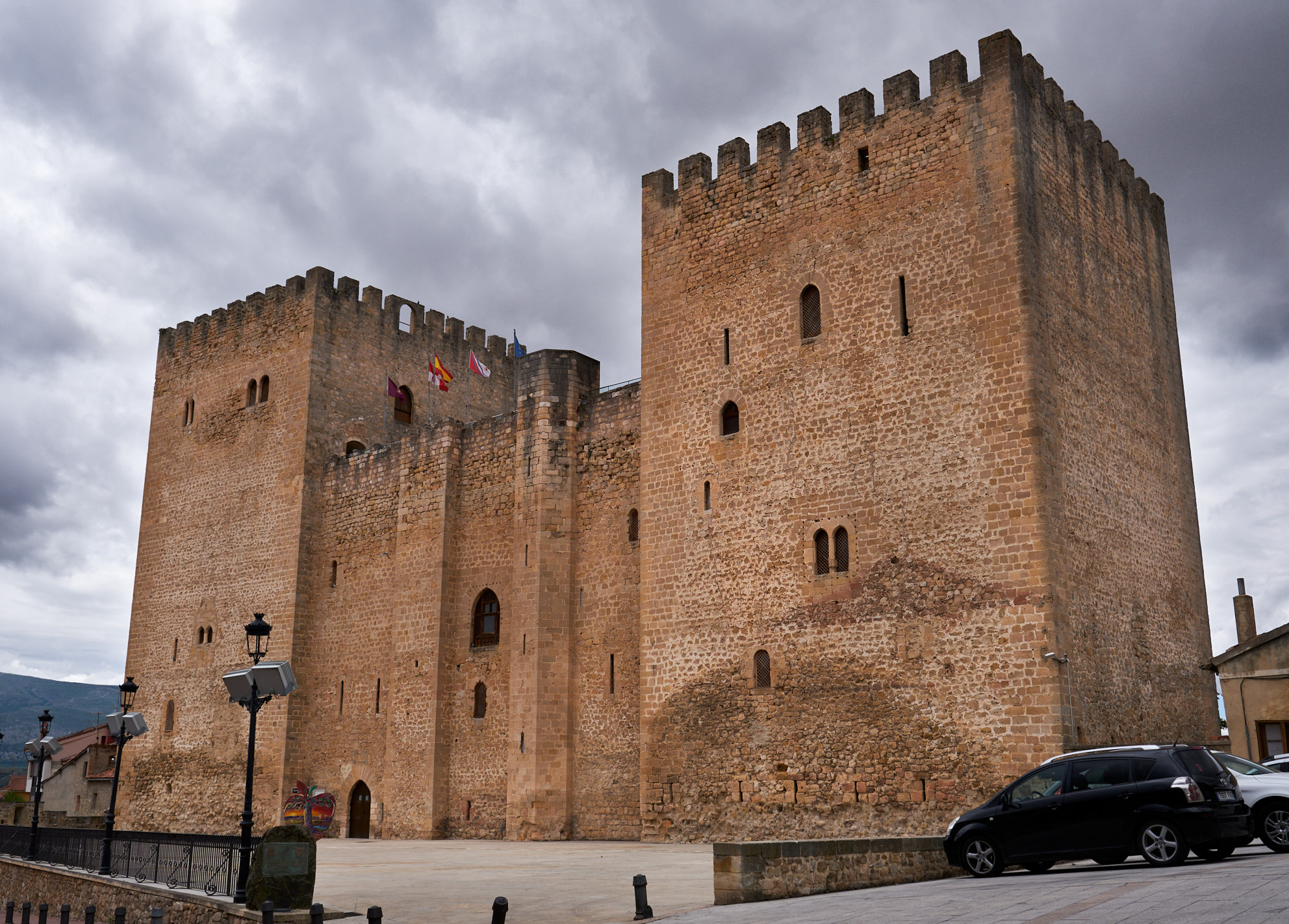
Medina de Pomar

== See also ==
- Treviño enclave
