= Villambistia =

Coordinates: 42°24′N 3°16′W

- municipality
- Flag Coat of arms
- Interactive map of Villambistia
- Country: Spain
- Autonomous community: Castile and León
- Province: Burgos

Area
  - Total: 13 km^{2} (5.0 sq mi)

Population (2025-01-01)
  - Total: 44
  - Density: 3.4/km^{2} (8.8/sq mi)
- Time zone: UTC+1 (CET)
  - Summer (DST): UTC+2 (CEST)

Villambistia is a municipality located in the province of Burgos, Castile and León, Spain. According to the 2004 census (INE), the municipality has a population of 65 inhabitants.

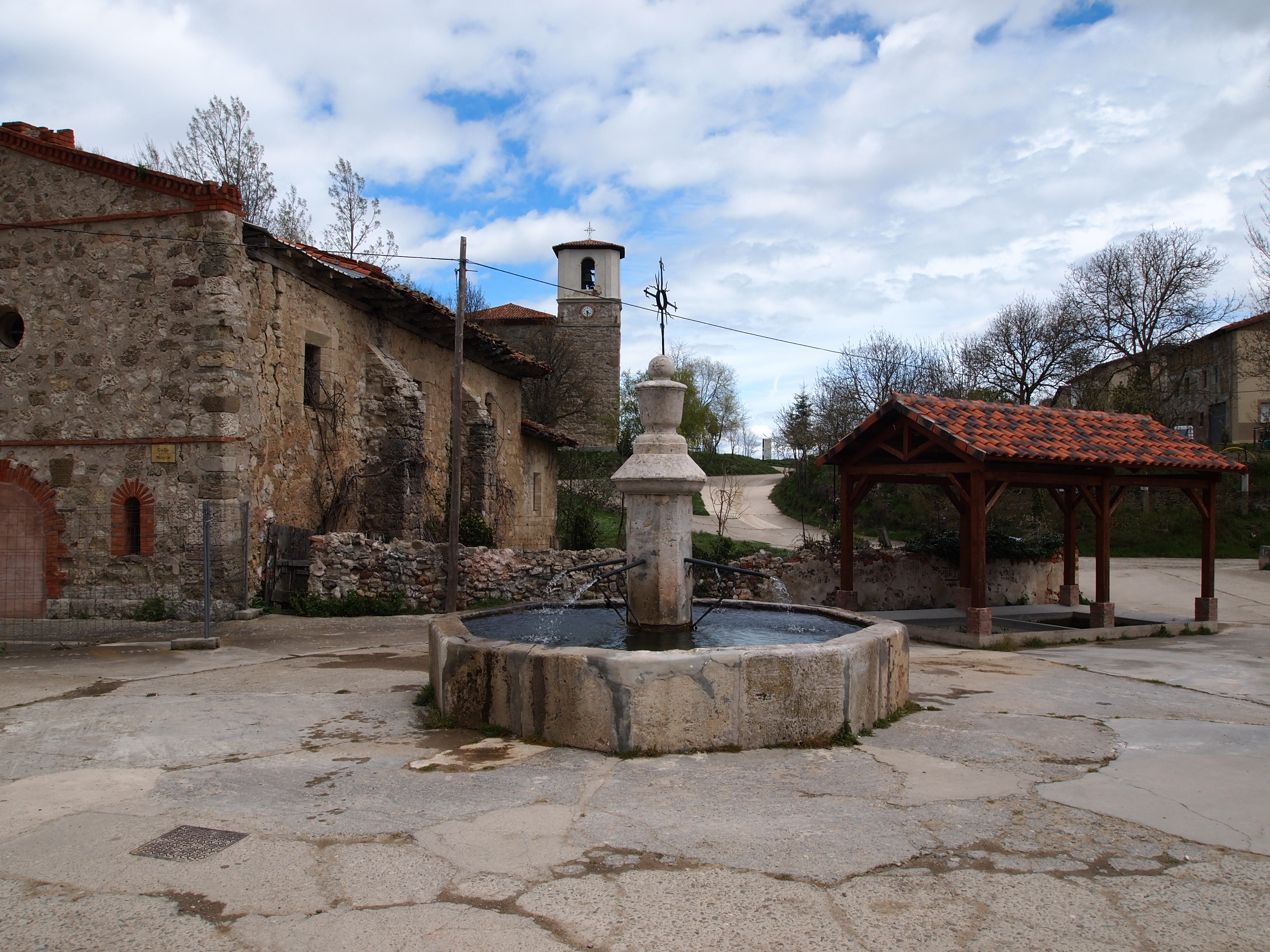
Main Square, Villambistia, Burgos
