= Prádanos de Bureba =

Coordinates: 42°30′N 3°21′W

- Municipality and town
- Coat of arms

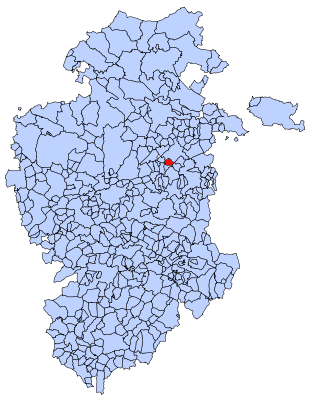
- Municipal location of Prádanos de Bureba in Burgos province
- Country: Spain
- Autonomous community: Castile and León
- Province: Burgos
- Comarca: La Bureba

Area
  - Total: 10 km^{2} (3.9 sq mi)
- Elevation: 765 m (2,510 ft)

Population (2025-01-01)
  - Total: 54
  - Density: 5.4/km^{2} (14/sq mi)
- Time zone: UTC+1 (CET)
  - Summer (DST): UTC+2 (CEST)
- Postal code: 09248
- Website: http://www.pradanosdebureba.es/

Prádanos de Bureba is a municipality and town located in the province of Burgos, Castile and León, Spain. According to the 2004 census (INE), the municipality has a population of 59 inhabitants.
