= Arraya de Oca =

Coordinates: 42°25′N 3°24′W

- Municipality and town
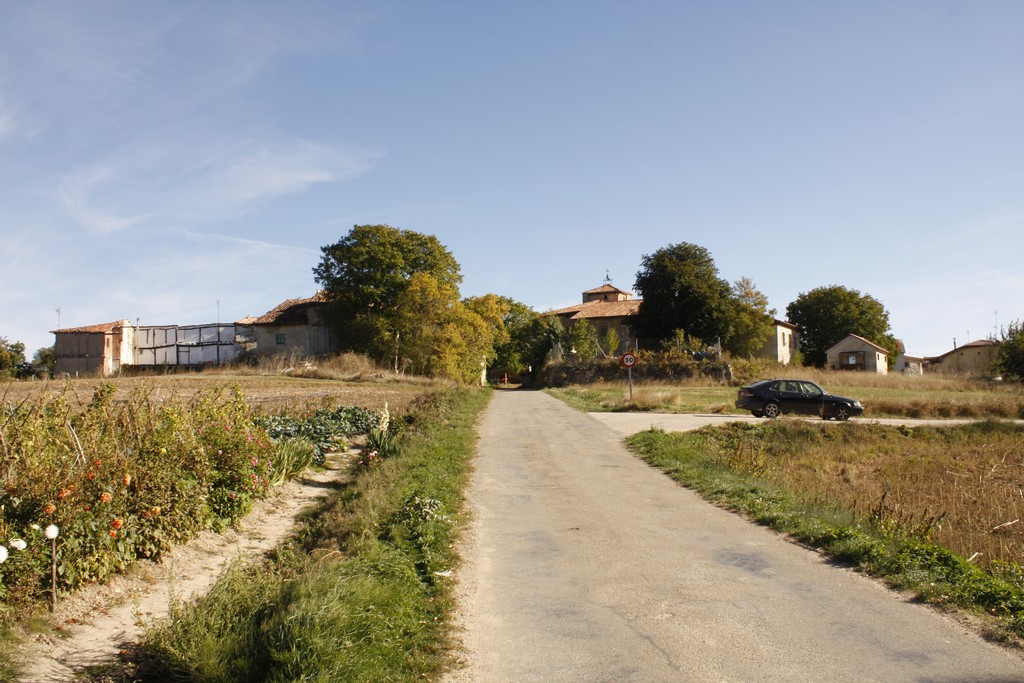
- View of Arraya de Oca, 2009

- Coat of arms

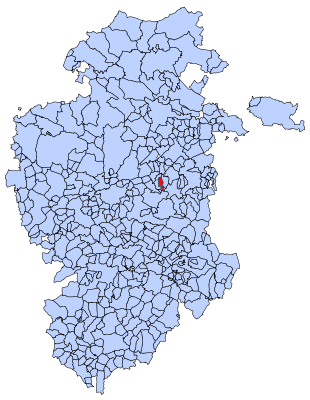
- Municipal location of Arraya de Oca in Burgos province
- Country: Spain
- Autonomous community: Castile and León
- Province: Burgos
- Comarca: Montes de Oca

Area
  - Total: 12.25 km^{2} (4.73 sq mi)
- Elevation: 924 m (3,031 ft)

Population (2025-01-01)
  - Total: 49
  - Density: 4.0/km^{2} (10/sq mi)
- Time zone: UTC+1 (CET)
  - Summer (DST): UTC+2 (CEST)
- Postal code: 09292
- Website: http://www.arrayadeoca.es/

Arraya de Oca is a municipality and town located in the province of Burgos, Castile and León, Spain. According to the 2004 census (INE), the municipality has a population of 53 inhabitants.
