= Espinosa del Camino =

- municipality
- Flag Coat of arms

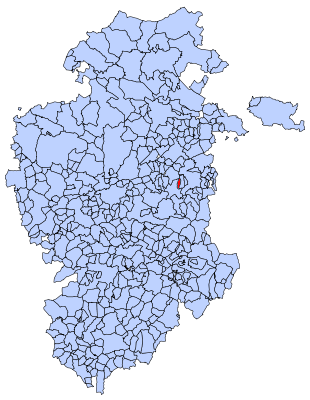
- Municipal location of Espinosa del Camino in Burgos province
- Coordinates: 42°24′21″N 3°16′50″W
- Country: Spain
- Autonomous community: Castile and León
- Province: Burgos
- Comarca: La Bureba

Area
  - Total: 7 km^{2} (2.7 sq mi)

Population (2025-01-01)
  - Total: 43
  - Density: 6.1/km^{2} (16/sq mi)
- Time zone: UTC+1 (CET)
  - Summer (DST): UTC+2 (CEST)
- Postal code: 09258
- Website: http://www.espinosadelcamino.es/

Espinosa del Camino is a municipality located in the province of Burgos, Castile and León, Spain. According to the 2004 census (INE), the municipality has a population of 36 inhabitants.
