= Villagalijo =

Coordinates: 42°21′N 3°11′W

- municipality
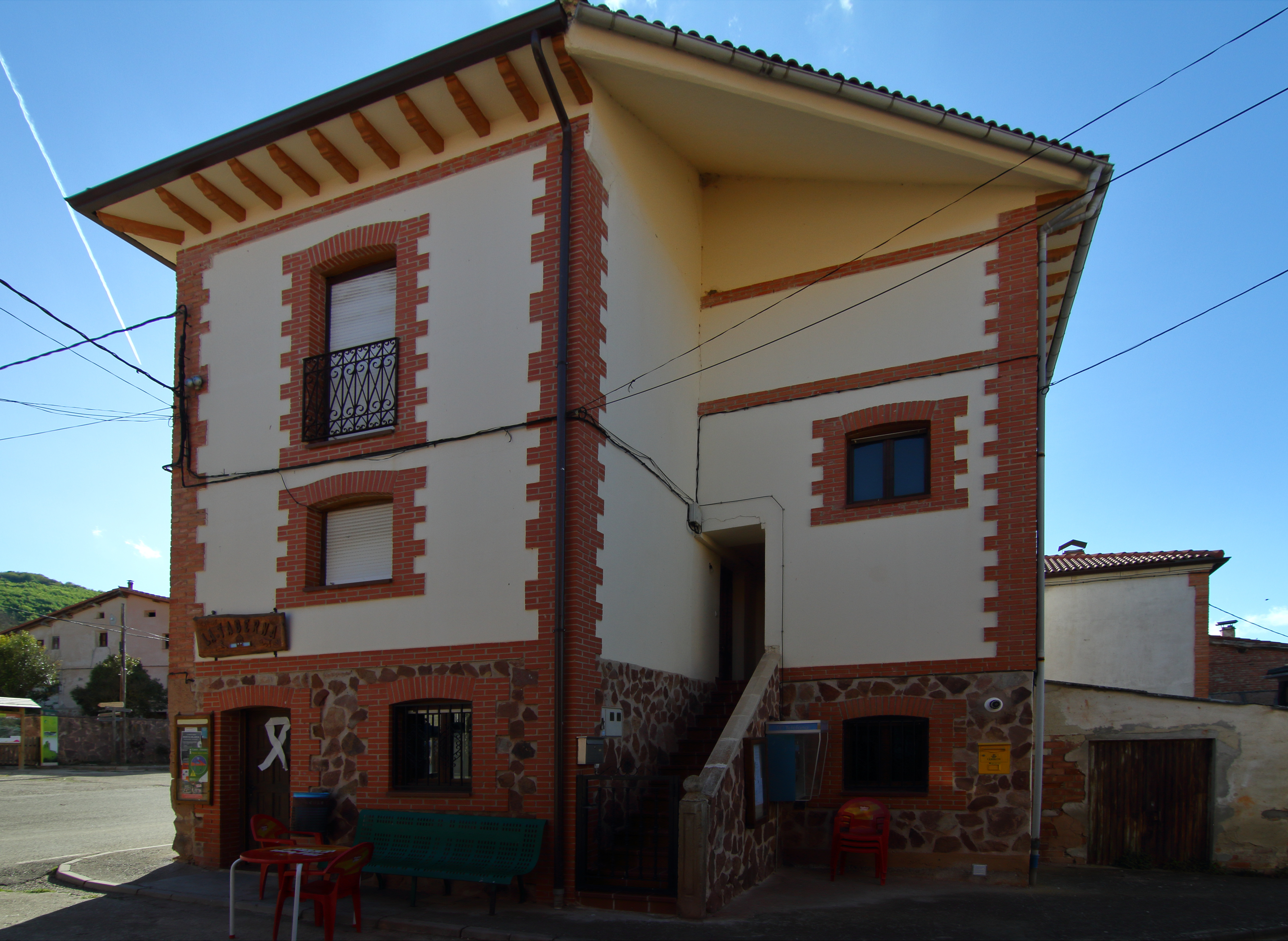
- Villagalijo Town Hall Building

- Coat of arms
- Interactive map of Villagalijo
- Country: Spain
- Autonomous community: Castile and León
- Province: Burgos

Area
  - Total: 22 km^{2} (8.5 sq mi)

Population (2025-01-01)
  - Total: 52
  - Density: 2.4/km^{2} (6.1/sq mi)
- Time zone: UTC+1 (CET)
  - Summer (DST): UTC+2 (CEST)

Villagalijo is a municipality located in the province of Burgos, Castile and León, Spain. According to the 2004 census (INE), the municipality has a population of 80 inhabitants.
