= Villaescusa la Sombría =

Coordinates: 42°25′N 3°25′W

Villaescusa la Sombría, Spain
- Interactive map of Villaescusa la Sombría, Spain
- Country: Spain
- Autonomous community: Castile and León
- Province: Burgos
- Municipality: Villaescusa la Sombría

Area
  - Total: 16.24 km^{2} (6.27 sq mi)
- Elevation: 910 m (2,990 ft)

Population (2025-01-01)
  - Total: 61
  - Density: 3.8/km^{2} (9.7/sq mi)
- Time zone: UTC+1 (CET)
  - Summer (DST): UTC+2 (CEST)

Villaescusa la Sombría is a municipality located in the province of Burgos, Castile and León, Spain. According to the 2016 census (INE), the municipality had a population of 72 inhabitants.
