= Villafranca Montes de Oca =

Coordinates: 42.3882°N 3.3090°W

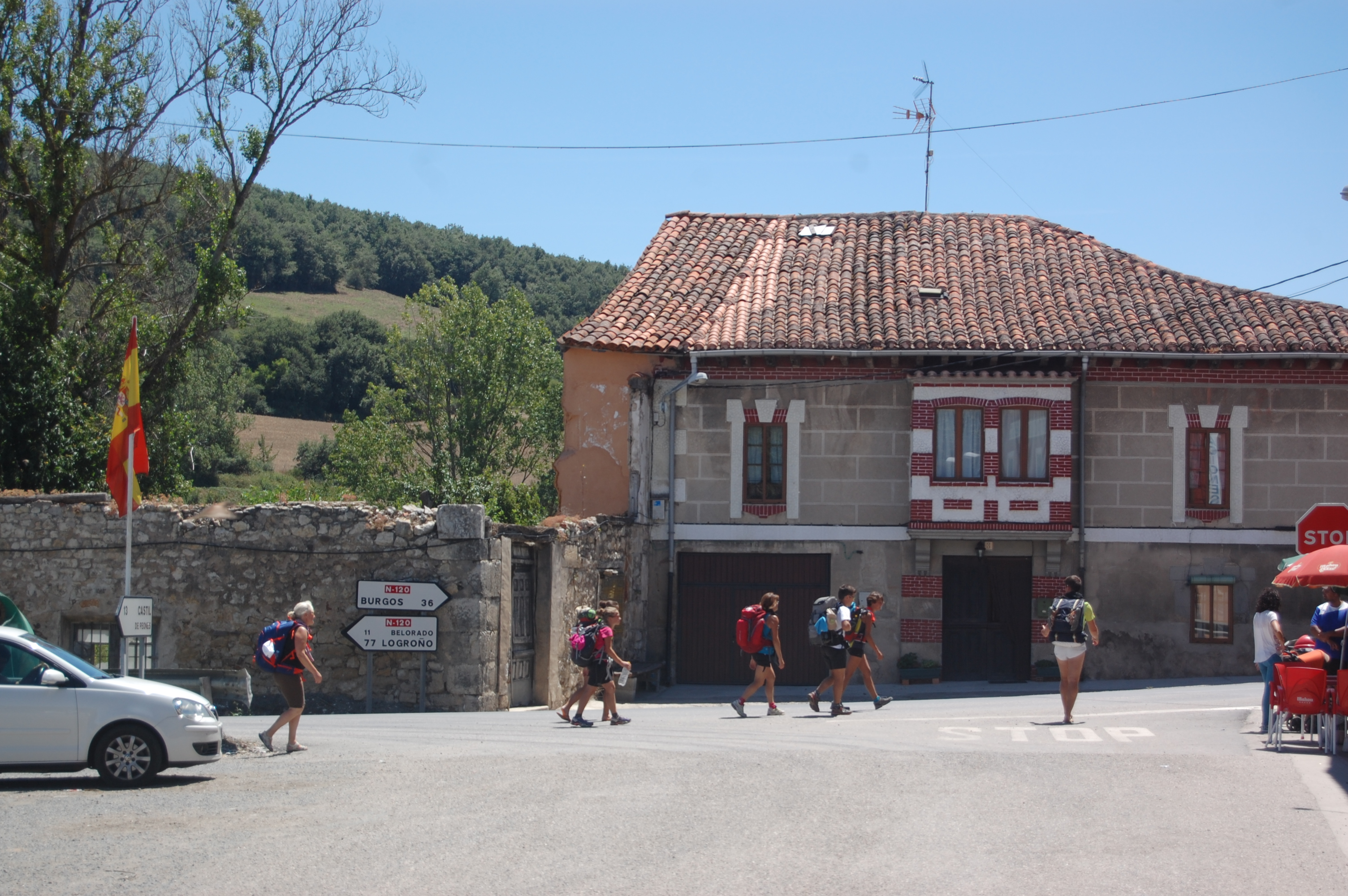

- Flag Coat of arms
- Interactive map of Villafranca Montes de Oca
- Country: Spain
- Autonomous community: Castile and León
- Province: Burgos
- Municipality: Villafranca Montes de Oca

Area
  - Total: 52 km^{2} (20 sq mi)
- Elevation: 948 m (3,110 ft)

Population (2025-01-01)
  - Total: 117
  - Density: 2.2/km^{2} (5.8/sq mi)
- Time zone: UTC+1 (CET)
  - Summer (DST): UTC+2 (CEST)

Villafranca Montes de Oca is a municipality, former medieval bishopric and present Latin titular see located in the province of Burgos, Castile and León, northern Spain. According to the 2005 census (INE), the municipality has a population of 164 inhabitants.

== Ecclesiastical history ==
It was originally known as Oca (Latin: Auca) and was the seat of a (Latin Catholic) bishopric, precursor of the present the Roman Catholic Archdiocese of Burgos, established no later than 589, when its bishop Asterio attended the Third Council of Toledo, but vaguer notations may trace it back as early as the 3rd century AD. Monastic life flourished there during the Visigothic Catholic Kingdom of Toledo (6th-8th century).

However, in the 8th century, Arab Muslim invaders destroyed Oca, rendering its bishops errant, quoted by sources at Amaya, Valpuesta, Muñó, Sasamón, Oña, Gamonal, only to have their 'see' formally suppressed to restore definitively the Diocese of Burgos in 1075, confirmed by Pope Urban II en 1095.

The diocese was nominally restored in 1969 as a titular bishopric of Auca (Curiate Latin and Italian), Latin (adjective dioecesis) Aucen(sis).

== Notable locals ==
- Juan Mata, football (soccer) player (1988-)

== See also ==
- List of Catholic dioceses in Spain

== Sources and external links ==
- Website of the (successor) archdiocese of Burgos (in Spanish)
- GCatholic - titular see of Auco (Oca), with Google satellite photo
- "Auca". Catholic-Hierarchy.org. David M. Cheney.
