= Valle de Oca =

Coordinates: 42.4333°N 3.31667°W

- municipality
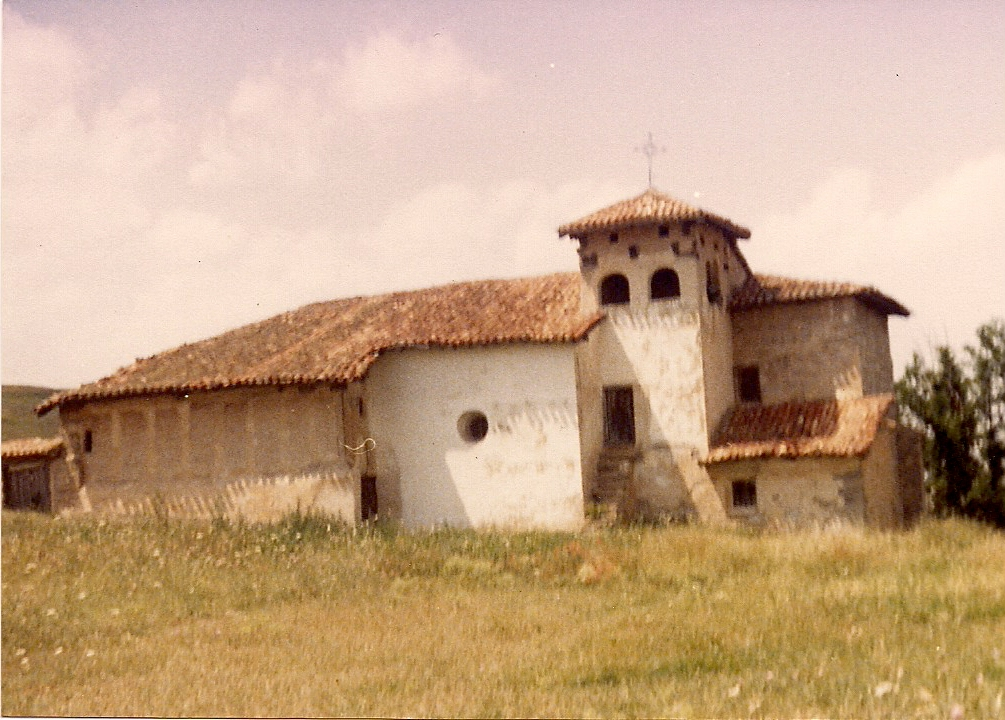
- Villalbos Church in 1986

- Flag Coat of arms
- Interactive map of Valle de Oca
- Country: Spain
- Autonomous community: Castile and León
- Province: Burgos

Area
  - Total: 38 km^{2} (15 sq mi)

Population (2025-01-01)
  - Total: 160
  - Density: 4.2/km^{2} (11/sq mi)
- Time zone: UTC+1 (CET)
  - Summer (DST): UTC+2 (CEST)

Valle de Oca is a municipality located in the province of Burgos, Castile and León, Spain. According to the 2022 census (INE), the municipality has a population of 165 inhabitants.
