= Belorado =

Coordinates: 42°25′N 3°11′W

- Municipality and town
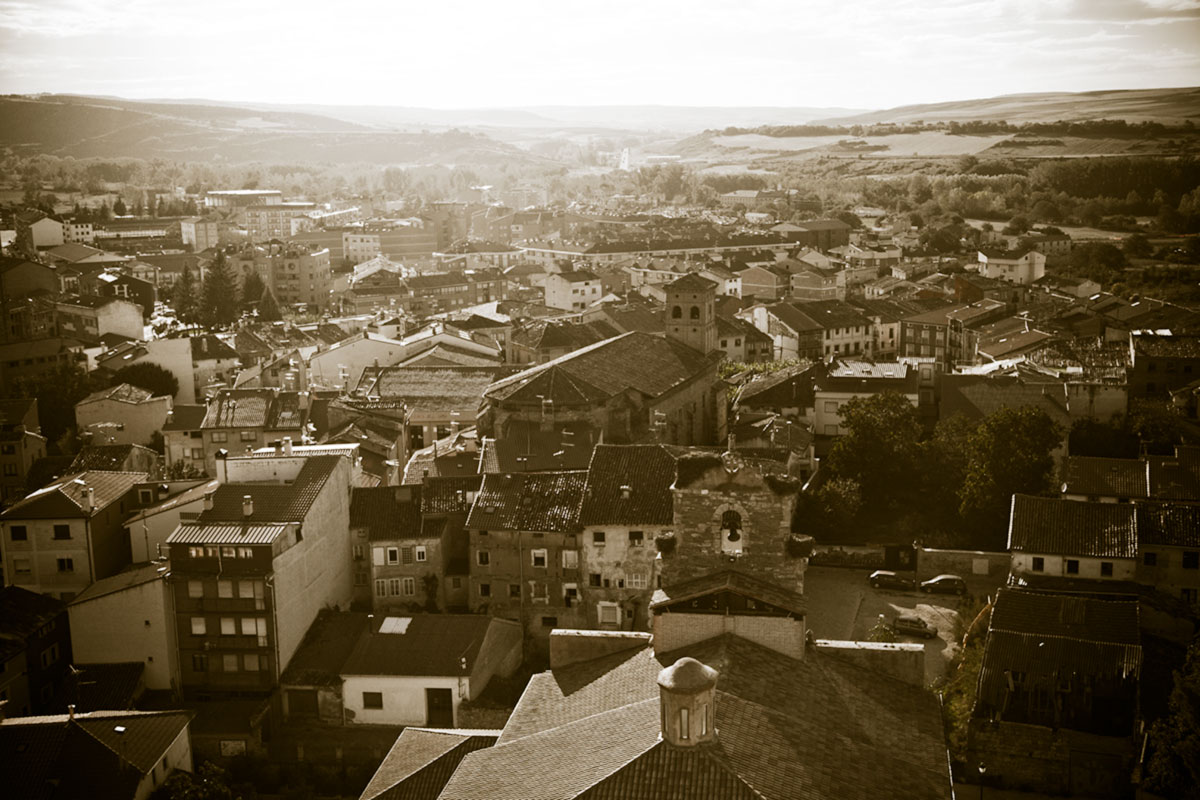
- View of Belorado, 2012

- Flag Coat of arms
- Motto: Tiene Tirón ("Has Tirón")
- Interactive map of Belorado
- Country: Spain
- Autonomous community: Castile and León
- Province: Burgos
- Comarca: Montes de Oca

Government
  - Mayor: Luis Jorge del Barco López (PP)

Area
  - Total: 133.41 km^{2} (51.51 sq mi)
- Elevation: 772 m (2,533 ft)

Population (2025-01-01)
  - Total: 1,823
  - Density: 13.66/km^{2} (35.39/sq mi)
- Time zone: UTC+1 (CET)
  - Summer (DST): UTC+2 (CEST)
- Postal code: 09250
- Website: http://www.belorado.org/

Belorado is a village and municipality in Spain, belonging to the Province of Burgos, in the autonomous community of Castile-Leon. It has a population of approximately 2,100 inhabitants. It is also known for being a city in the Way of Saint James.

The municipality of Belorado is made up of six towns: Belorado (seat or capital), Avellanosa de Rioja, Eterna, Puras de Villafranca, Quintanaloranco, Loranquillo and San Miguel de Pedroso.

Belorado is known for the annual Feria Alfonsina festival. The village also attracts hikers along the Camino de Santiago trail from Najera.

In the town is the Church of Santa Maria.
