= La Bureba =

Coordinates: 42°36′09″N 3°21′33″W

- Comarca
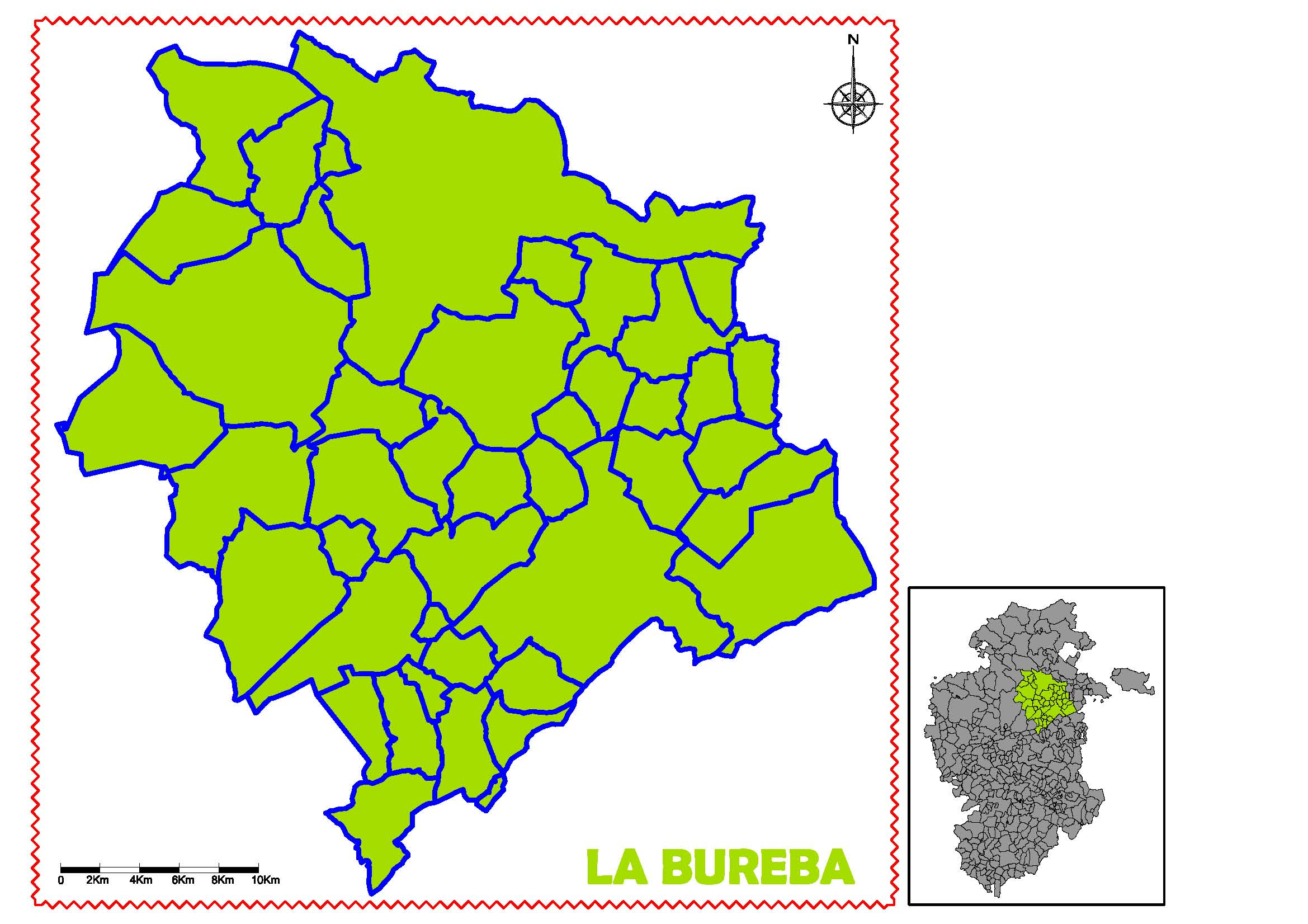
- Country: Spain
- Autonomous community: Castile and León
- Province: Burgos
- Capital: Briviesca
- Time zone: UTC+1 (CET)
  - Summer (DST): UTC+2 (CEST)
- Largest municipality: Briviesca

La Bureba is a comarca located in the northeast of the Province of Burgos in the autonomous community of Castile and León, Spain. It is bounded on the north by Las Merindades, east by the Comarca del Ebro, south-east by the Montes de Oca and south-west by the Alfoz de Burgos.

== Administrative entities ==
The comarca capital is Briviesca.

=== Municipalities (44) ===
- Abajas
- Aguas Cándidas (2)
- Aguilar de Bureba
- Alcocero de Mola
- Bañuelos de Bureba
- Barrios de Bureba, Los (4)
- Berzosa de Bureba
- Briviesca (4)
- Busto de Bureba
- Cantabrana
- Carcedo de Bureba (2)
- Carrias
- Cascajares de Bureba
- Castil de Peones
- Cubo de Bureba
- Fuentebureba (1)
- Galbarros (3)
- Grisaleña
- Llano de Bureba
- Miraveche
- Monasterio de Rodilla
- Navas de Bureba
- Oña (12)
- Padrones de Bureba
- Piérnigas
- Poza de la Sal (2)
- Prádanos de Bureba
- Quintanabureba
- Quintanaélez (1)
- Quintanavides
- Quintanilla San García
- Reinoso
- Rojas
- Rublacedo de Abajo (1)
- Rucandio (5)
- Salas de Bureba
- Salinillas de Bureba (2)
- Santa María Rivarredonda (1)
- Santa Olalla de Bureba
- Vallarta de Bureba
- Vid de Bureba, La
- Vileña
- Villanueva de Teba
- Zuñeda

== Geography ==
La Bureba is criss-crossed by several small rivers and arroyos that empty into the Ebro river: the Homino, Oroncillo, Oca, and Tirón. The mountain ranges of the northwesternmost end of the Sistema Ibérico are located in La Bureba.

== See also ==
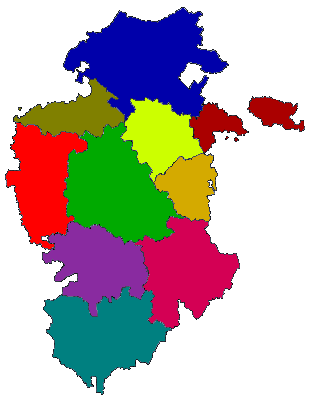
Shires of Burgos.: Páramos; Alfoz de Burgos; Odra y Pisuerga; Arlanza; Ribera del Duero; Merindades; Ebro; La Bureba; Montes de Oca; Sierra de la Demanda

- Province of Burgos
