= Juan Antonio Álvarez de Arenales =

Argentine general (1770–1831)

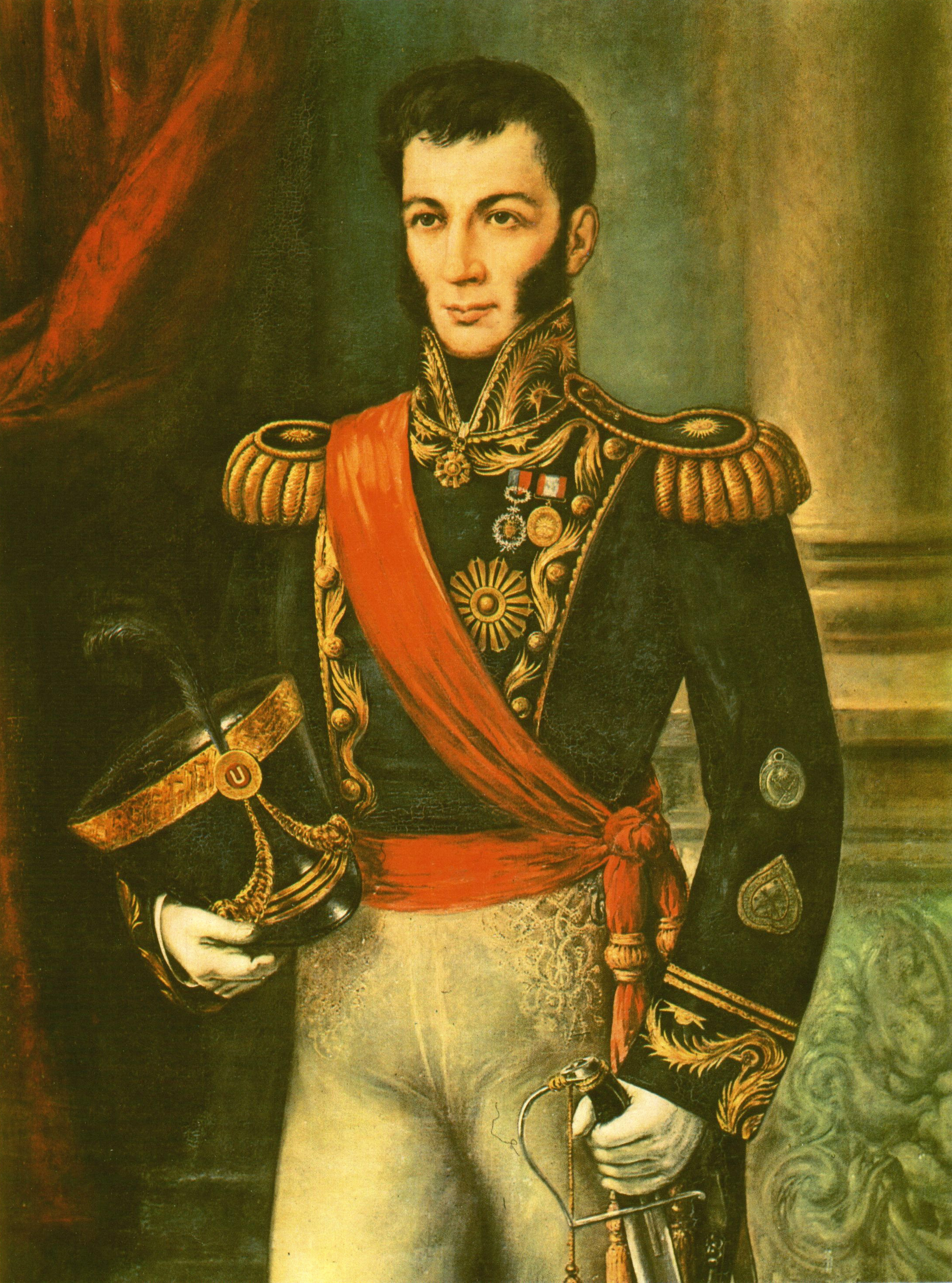
- The Argentine general
- Born: June 13, 1770; Reinoso, Spain
- Died: December 4, 1831; Moraya, Bolivia
- Title: Governor of Salta Province
- Term: January 1, 1824 - February 10, 1827
- Predecessor: José Ignacio de Gorriti
- Successor: José Ignacio de Gorriti
- Political party: Unitarian Party

Juan Antonio Álvarez de Arenales (Reinoso, Spain, June 13, 1770 – Moraya, Bolivia, December 4, 1831) was an Argentine general of Spanish origin (considered also a Bolivian for his activities in Bolivia) who fought in the war for the United Provinces of the Río de la Plata, Chile and Peru.

== Early life ==
It is believed he was born in Spain in the town called Villa de Reinoso, in Castile, in 1770, although others say that he could have been born in Salta. Son of Francisco Alvarez Arenales and Maria Gonzalez.

In 1784 he came with his family to Buenos Aires, where he was educated to follow an ecclesiastical career. Arenales chose a military career.

== Fights in Upper Peru ==
After completing his studies he was sent to Upper Peru, where he was part of the Chuquisaca Revolution of May 25, 1809, first movement against Spanish rule held in the Viceroyalty of the Río de la Plata.

With the victory in the Battle of La Florida, he received many wounds and almost lost his life, protected the entrance to the High Peru of the Northern Army, in his third attempt to incorporate the Upper Peru to the revolution, led by José Rondeau, and reoccupied the city of Cochabamba.

== Peruvian War of Independence ==
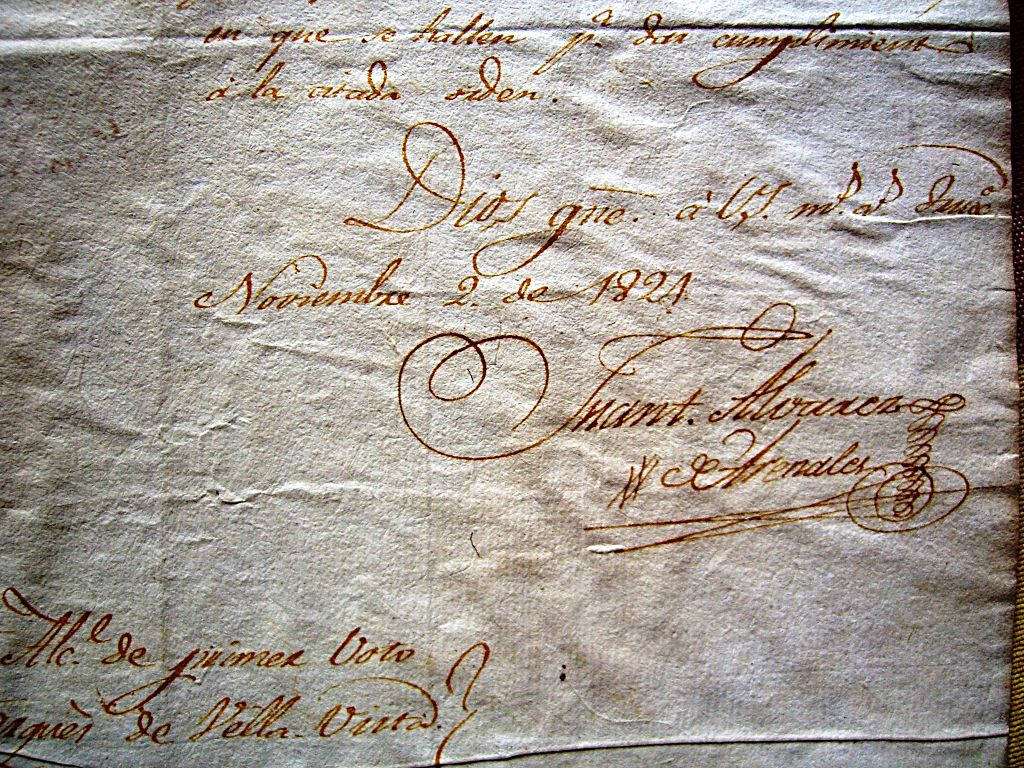
Signature of Arenales

There he was promoted to general and confronted Martin Miguel de Guemes, leader by the way he was carrying on the Guerra Gaucha, successful defensive strategy of defending northern border, but very expensive for the province, especially for high classes.

In the mid-1817 he was named provincial commander of the army of Cordoba in almost permanent struggle with small groups of rebels gauchos, no positive results against the feds.

=== Sierra Campaign ===
In 1819 Arenales joined the Army of the Andes in Chile. General José de San Martín orders Arenales to command an expedition as part of the Freedom Expedition of Peru, sending him to Pisco, Peru on 5 October 1820, beginning the Sierra Expedition. After his arrival, at the destination, he took over the two major campaigns to the mountains.

On 6 December 1820, Arenales led troops into the Battle of Pasco (es), using thick snowfall to launch a surprise attack. Arenales defeated the royalist troops commanded by Diego O'Reilly, capturing O'Reilly and incorporating prisoners into his own forces. Upon news that royalist forces were defeated by Arenales' expedition, the city of Huánuco called for a town meeting on 9 December 1820. Don Eduardo Lúcar y Torre, a colonel of the royalist army, allowed the citizens of Huánuco to vote on whether or not to join Arenales' cause, with the majority voting to join the patriot movement. On 15 December 1820, Huánuco declared independence and because of their assistance, Lúcar y Torre was named Mayor of Huánuco and José Figueroa was named the commander of arms. On 8 January 1821, Arenales regrouped with General San Martín.

== Governor of Salta ==
On January 1, 1824 he was named governor of Salta. His administration was orderly and efficient, seeking a liberal provincial government in accordance with the central government which had been established by Bernardino Rivadavia in Buenos Aires. The following year he made a final campaign to Upper Peru, hoping to fight against one the last two royalist strongholds in continental America (the other being El Callao in coastal Peru), but royalist general Pedro Antonio Olañeta was murdered by his own soldiers, and ultimately Arenales accomplished nothing. He even failed to reinstate the Tarija region (now in Bolivia) as part of Salta.

== Death ==
He died in the town of Moraya, Bolivia, in 1831, at the home of Colonel José Manuel Pizarro. He was buried there in the common ossuary except the skull, preserved by Colonel Pizarro and delivered in the city of Buenos Aires to María Josefa Uriburu Arenales, daughter and mother of the future president of Argentina, José Evaristo Uriburu. In May 1959 his remains arrived in Salta, being deposited in the "Pantheon of North Glories of the Republic", after satisfying a civic-military moving ceremony at the Cathedral of Salta.
