= Hozabejas =

Hamlet in Burgos, Spain

Coordinates: 42°44′N 3°32′W

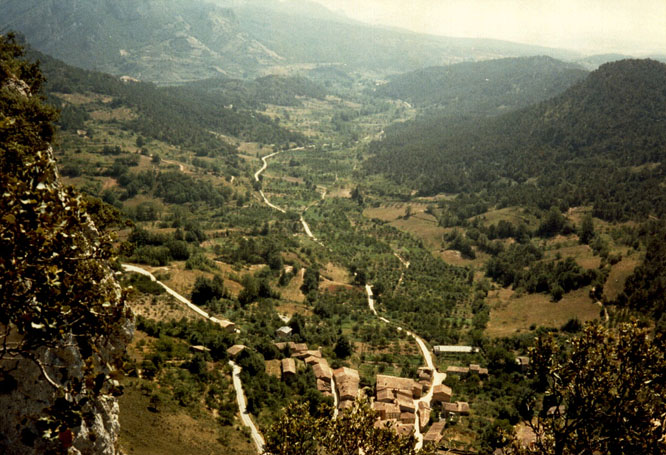

Hozabejas is a hamlet which belongs to the municipality of Rucandio, Burgos, Spain. It had a reported population of 13 in 2017.
