= Carcedo =

Carcedo may refer to:

== People ==
- Juan Carlos Carcedo, Spanish footballer
- María Luisa Carcedo, Spanish politician

== Places ==
- Carcedo de Bureba
- Carcedo de Burgos
