= Castil =

Castil may refer to:

- Castil de Peones, municipality located in the province of Burgos, Castile and León, Spain
- Castil de Vela, municipality located in the province of Palencia, Castile and León, Spain
- Castil-Blaze, known as Castil-Blaze (1784–1857), French musicologist, music critic, composer, and music editor
