= Salinillas de Bureba =

Coordinates: 42°33′N 3°23′W

- Municipality and town
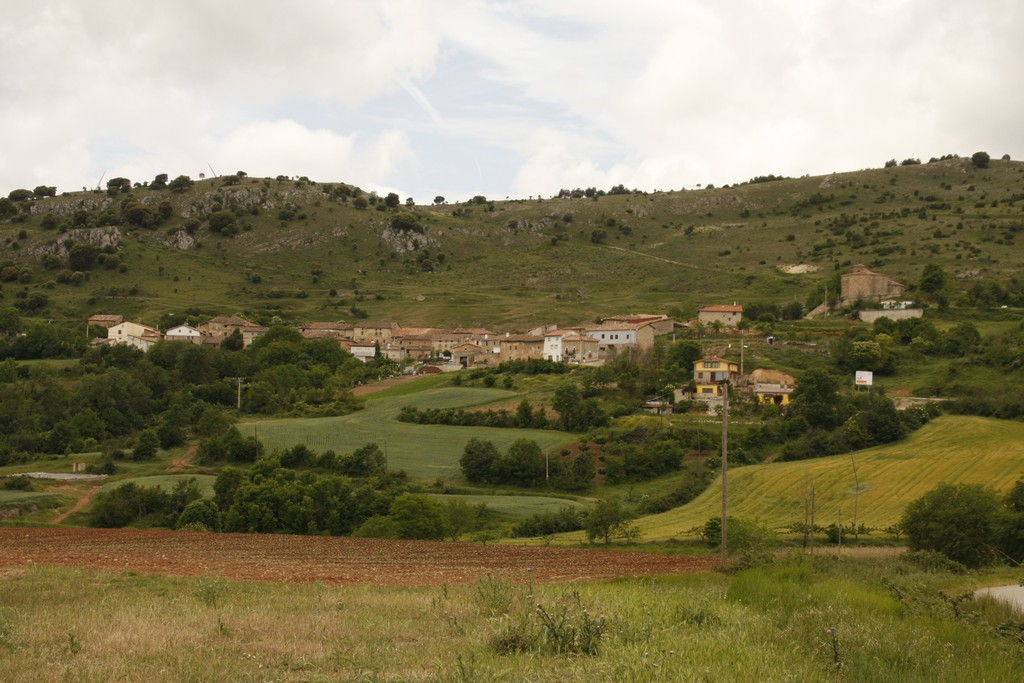
- View of Salinillas de Bureba, 2010

- Flag Coat of arms

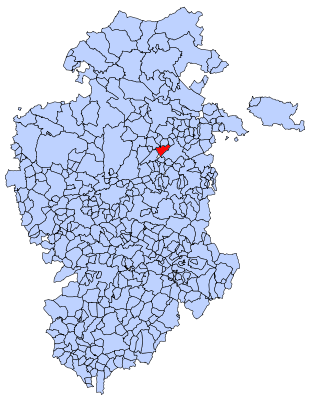
- Municipal location of Salinillas de Bureba in Burgos province
- Country: Spain
- Autonomous community: Castile and León
- Province: Burgos
- Comarca: La Bureba

Area
  - Total: 22.83 km^{2} (8.81 sq mi)

Population (2025-01-01)
  - Total: 55
  - Density: 2.4/km^{2} (6.2/sq mi)
- Time zone: UTC+1 (CET)
  - Summer (DST): UTC+2 (CEST)
- Postal code: 09247
- Website: http://www.salinillasdebureba.es/

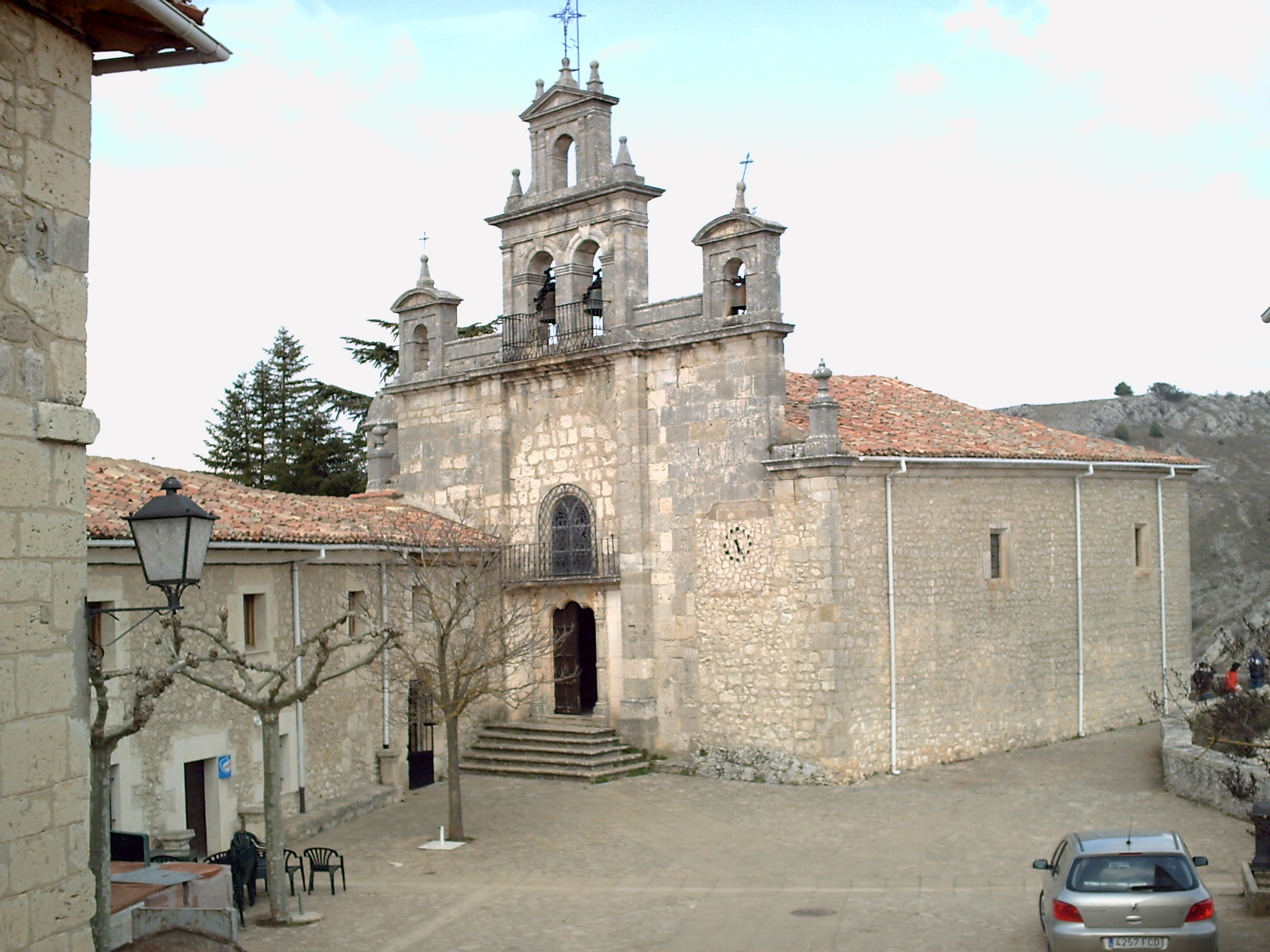
Santa Casilda sanctuary (16th century)

Salinillas de Bureba is a municipality and town located in the province of Burgos, Castile and León, Spain. According to the 2014 census (INE), the municipality has a population of 51 inhabitants.

== Main sights ==
- Santa Casilda sanctuary (16th century)
