= Salas de Bureba =

Coordinates: 42°42′N 3°28′W

- Municipality and town
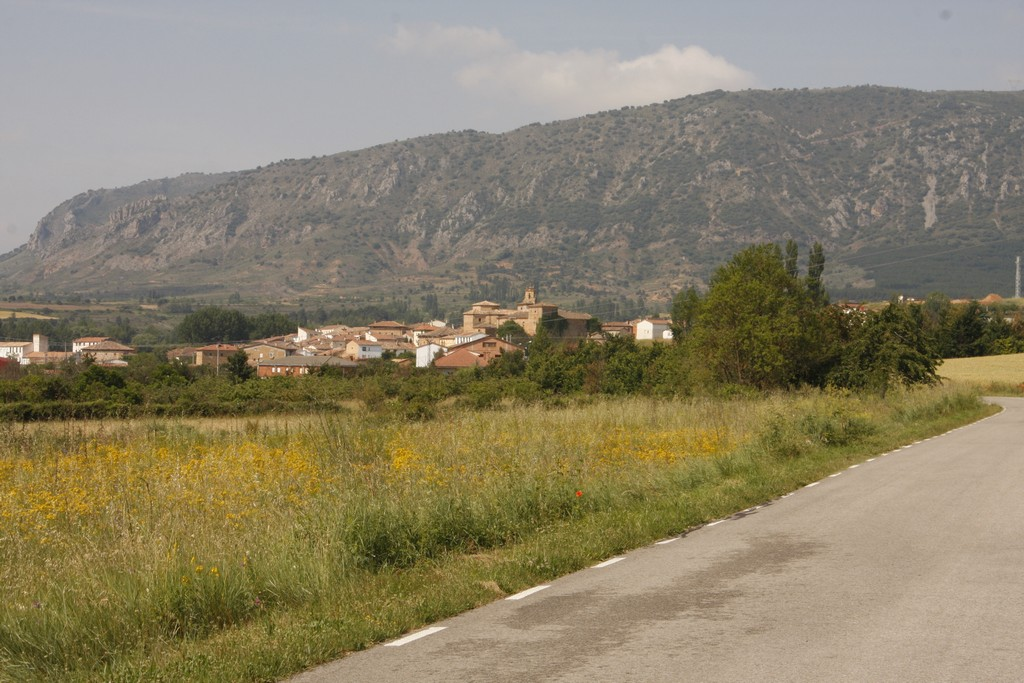
- View of Salas de Bureba, 2010

- Flag Coat of arms

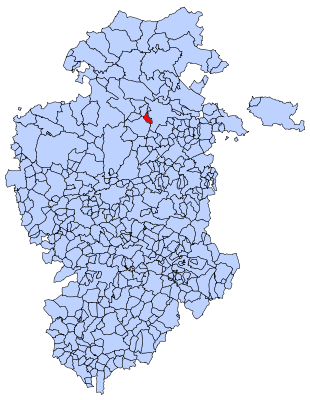
- Municipal location of Salas de Bureba in Burgos province
- Country: Spain
- Autonomous community: Castile and León
- Province: Burgos
- Comarca: La Bureba

Area
  - Total: 13 km^{2} (5.0 sq mi)
- Elevation: 640 m (2,100 ft)

Population (2025-01-01)
  - Total: 129
  - Density: 9.9/km^{2} (26/sq mi)
- Time zone: UTC+1 (CET)
  - Summer (DST): UTC+2 (CEST)
- Postal code: 09593
- Website: http://www.salasdebureba.es/

Salas de Bureba is a municipality and town located in the province of Burgos, Castile and León, Spain. According to the 2004 census (INE), the municipality has a population of 143 inhabitants.
