= Quintanilla San García =

- Municipality and town
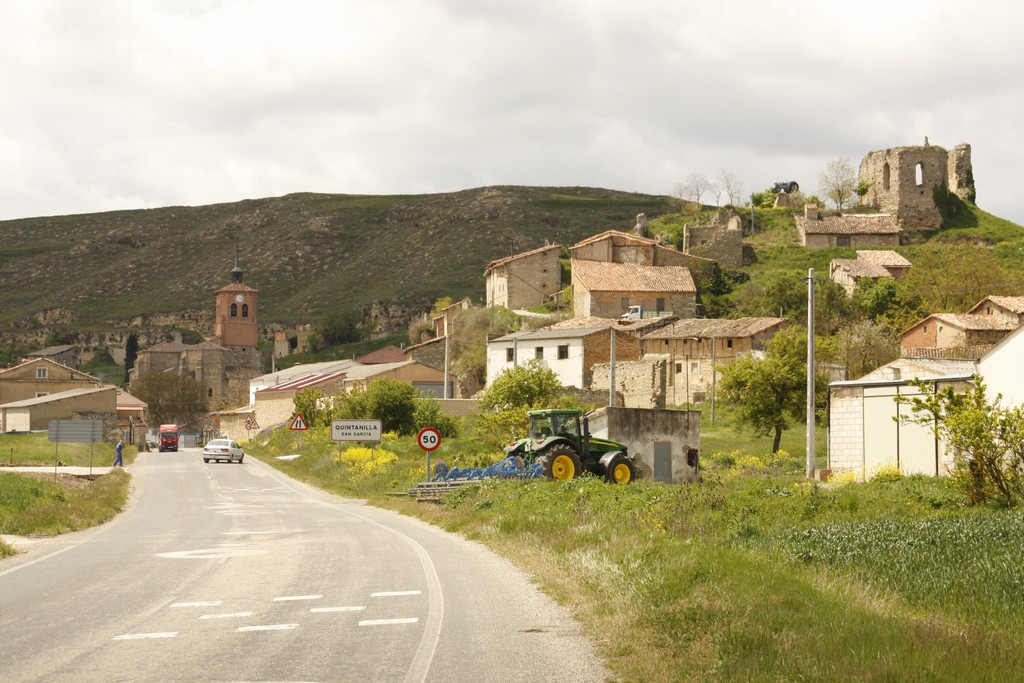
- View of Quintanilla San García, 2010

- Coat of arms

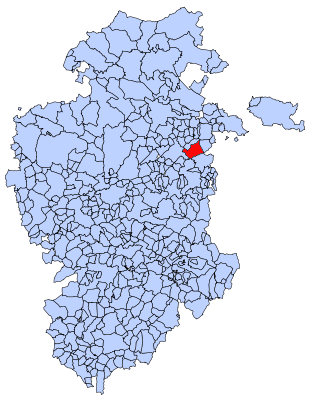
- Municipal location of Quintanilla San García in Burgos province
- Coordinates: 42.5500°N 3.1833°W
- Country: Spain
- Autonomous community: Castile and León
- Province: Burgos
- Comarca: La Bureba

Area
  - Total: 45.75 km^{2} (17.66 sq mi)
- Elevation: 725 m (2,379 ft)

Population (2025-01-01)
  - Total: 66
  - Density: 1.4/km^{2} (3.7/sq mi)
- Time zone: UTC+1 (CET)
  - Summer (DST): UTC+2 (CEST)
- Postal code: 09271
- Website: http://www.quintanillasangarcia.es/

Quintanilla San García is a municipality and town located in the province of Burgos, Castile and León, Spain. According to the 2013 census (INE), the municipality has a population of 101 inhabitants.
