= Llano de Bureba =

Coordinates: 42°37′N 3°27′W

- Municipality and town
- Coat of arms

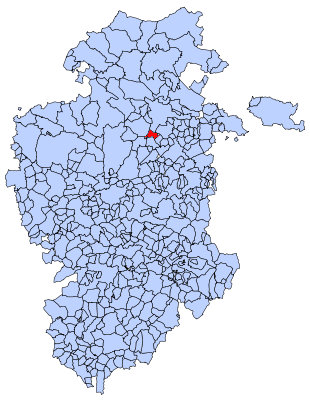
- Municipal location of Llano de Bureba in Burgos province
- Country: Spain
- Autonomous community: Castile and León
- Province: Burgos
- Comarca: La Bureba

Area
  - Total: 15 km^{2} (5.8 sq mi)
- Elevation: 664 m (2,178 ft)

Population (2025-01-01)
  - Total: 45
  - Density: 3.0/km^{2} (7.8/sq mi)
- Time zone: UTC+1 (CET)
  - Summer (DST): UTC+2 (CEST)
- Postal code: 09246
- Website: http://www.llanodebureba.es/

Llano de Bureba is a municipality and town located in the province of Burgos, Castile and León, Spain. According to the 2004 census (INE), the municipality has a population of 70 inhabitants.
