= Berzosa de Bureba =

Coordinates: 42°38′N 3°16′W

- Municipality and town
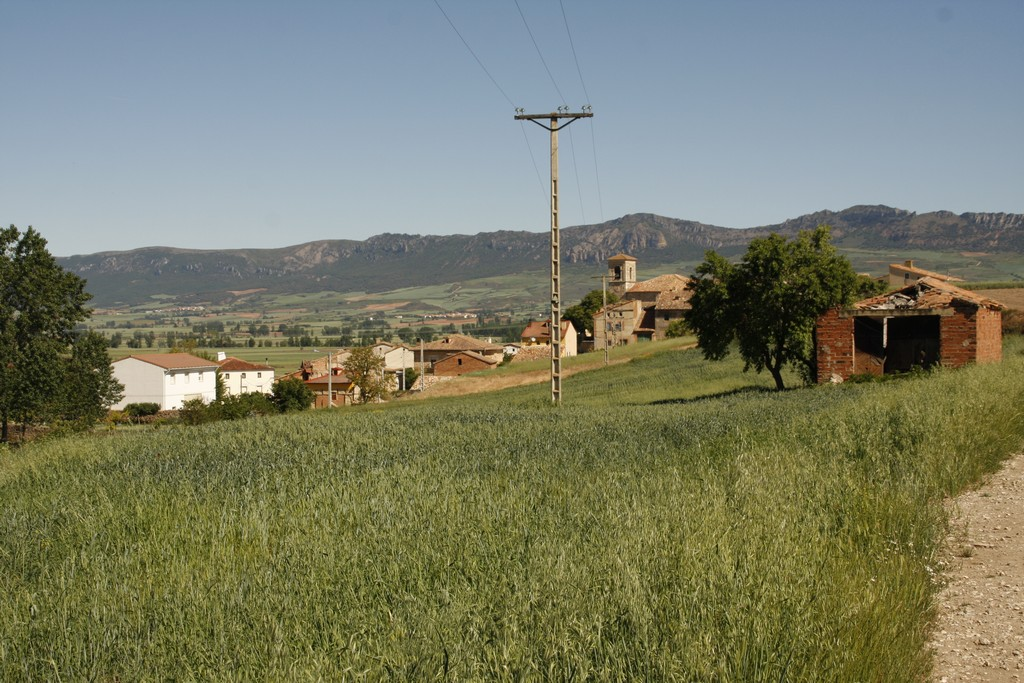
- View of Berzosa de Bureba, 2010

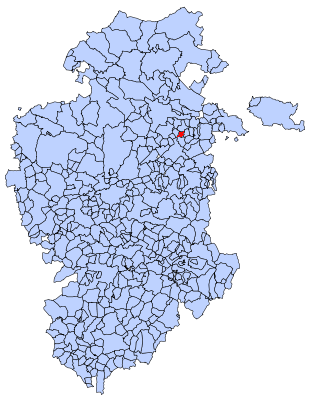
- Municipal location of Berzosa de Bureba in Burgos province
- Country: Spain
- Autonomous community: Castile and León
- Province: Burgos
- Comarca: La Bureba

Area
  - Total: 8 km^{2} (3.1 sq mi)
- Elevation: 681 m (2,234 ft)

Population (2025-01-01)
  - Total: 26
  - Density: 3.3/km^{2} (8.4/sq mi)
- Time zone: UTC+1 (CET)
  - Summer (DST): UTC+2 (CEST)
- Postal code: 09245
- Website: http://www.berzosadebureba.es/

Berzosa de Bureba is a municipality and town located in the province of Burgos, Castile and León, Spain. According to the 2004 census (INE), the municipality has a population of 48 inhabitants.
