= Galbarros =

Coordinates: 42°32′N 3°26′W

- Municipality
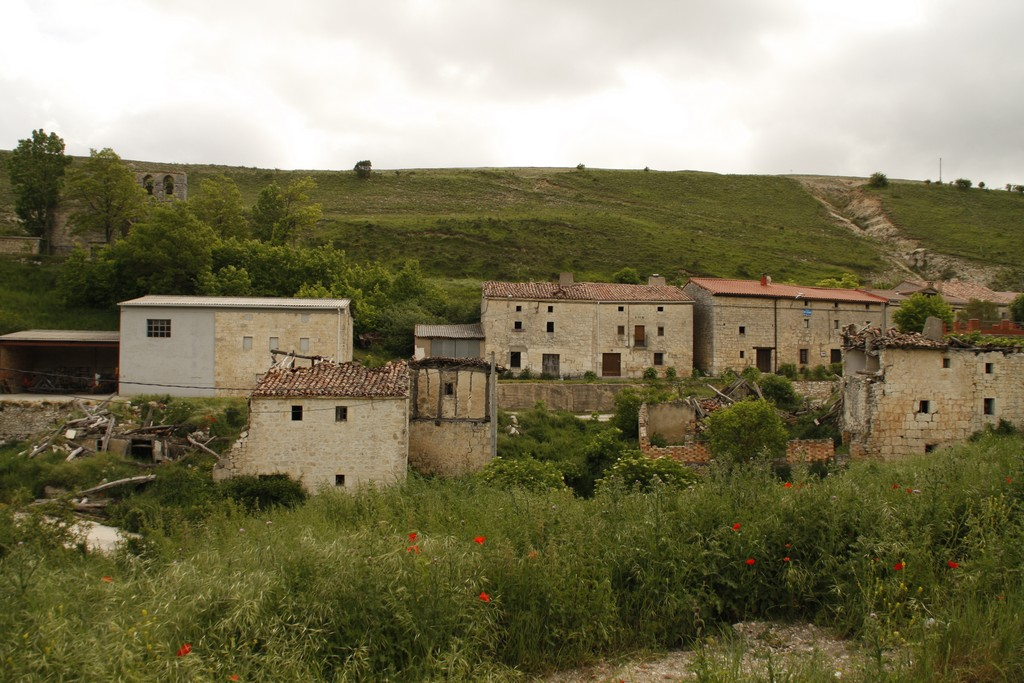
- View of Galbarros, 2010

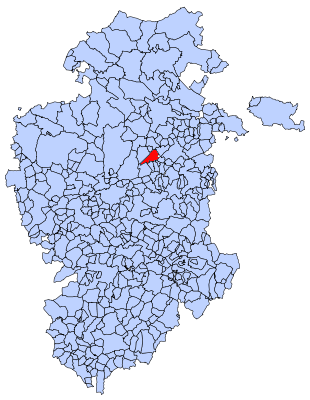
- Municipal location of Galbarros in Burgos province
- Country: Spain
- Autonomous community: Castile and León
- Province: Burgos
- Comarca: La Bureba

Area
  - Total: 32 km^{2} (12 sq mi)
- Elevation: 1,002 m (3,287 ft)

Population (2025-01-01)
  - Total: 28
  - Density: 0.87/km^{2} (2.3/sq mi)
- Time zone: UTC+1 (CET)
  - Summer (DST): UTC+2 (CEST)
- Postal code: 09247
- Website: http://www.galbarros.es/

Galbarros is a municipality located in the province of Burgos, Castile and León, Spain. According to the 2004 census (INE), the municipality has a population of 31 inhabitants.
