= Quintanaélez =

Coordinates: 42°40′N 3°18′W

- Municipality and town
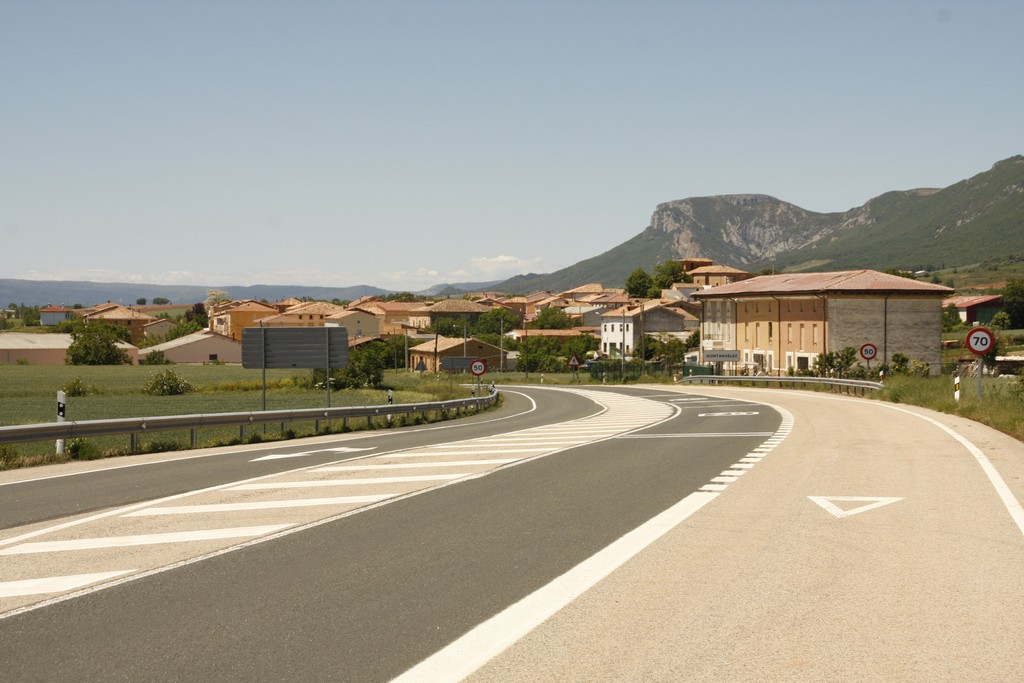
- View of Quintanaélez, 2010

- Flag Coat of arms

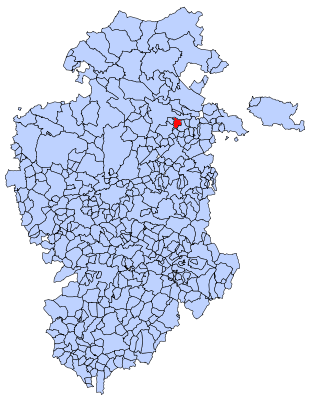
- Municipal location of Quintanaélez in Burgos province
- Country: Spain
- Autonomous community: Castile and León
- Province: Burgos
- Comarca: La Bureba

Area
  - Total: 17.47 km^{2} (6.75 sq mi)
- Elevation: 714 m (2,343 ft)

Population (2025-01-01)
  - Total: 44
  - Density: 2.5/km^{2} (6.5/sq mi)
- Time zone: UTC+1 (CET)
  - Summer (DST): UTC+2 (CEST)
- Postal code: 09244
- Website: http://www.quintanaelez.es/

Quintanaélez is a municipality and town located in the province of Burgos, Castile and León, Spain. According to the 2004 census (INE), the municipality has a population of 85 inhabitants.
