= Aguas Cándidas =

Coordinates: 42°43′N 3°30′W

- Municipality and town
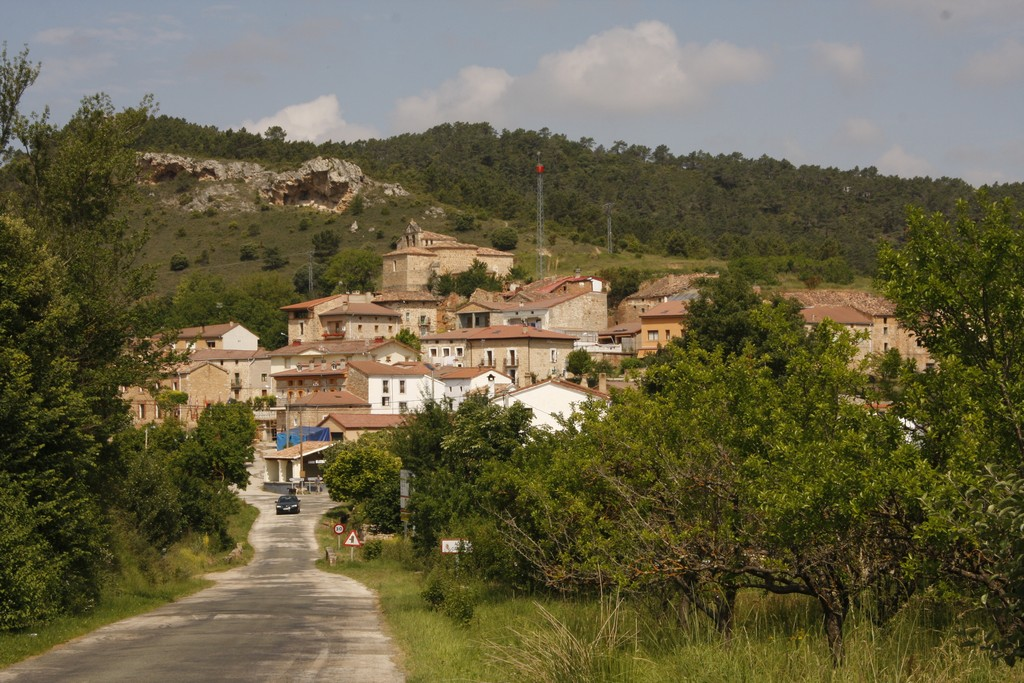
- View of Aguas Cándidas, 2010

- Coat of arms

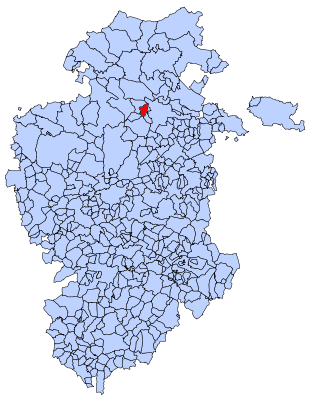
- Municipal location of Aguas Cándidas in Burgos province
- Country: Spain
- Autonomous community: Castile and León
- Province: Burgos
- Comarca: La Bureba
- Seat: Río Quintanilla

Area
  - Total: 17.95 km^{2} (6.93 sq mi)
- Elevation: 730 m (2,400 ft)

Population (2025-01-01)
  - Total: 61
  - Density: 3.4/km^{2} (8.8/sq mi)
- Time zone: UTC+1 (CET)
  - Summer (DST): UTC+2 (CEST)
- Postal code: 09593
- Website: http://www.aguascandidas.es/

Aguas Cándidas is a municipality and town located in the province of Burgos, Castile and León, Spain. According to the 2004 census (INE), the municipality had a population of 97 inhabitants.

The municipality of Aguas Cándidas is made up of three towns: Aguas Cándidas, Quintanaopio and Río Quintanilla (seat or capital).
