= Quintanabureba =

Coordinates: 42°35′N 3°19′W

- Municipality and town
- Flag Coat of arms

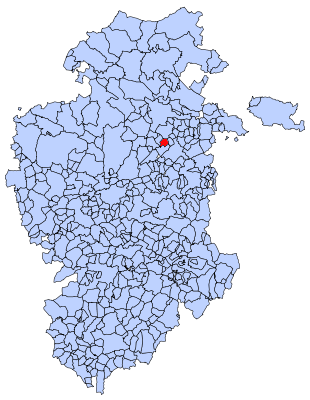
- Municipal location of Quintanabureba in Burgos province
- Country: Spain
- Autonomous community: Castile and León
- Province: Burgos
- Comarca: La Bureba

Area
  - Total: 12.36 km^{2} (4.77 sq mi)
- Elevation: 696 m (2,283 ft)

Population (2025-01-01)
  - Total: 29
  - Density: 2.3/km^{2} (6.1/sq mi)
- Time zone: UTC+1 (CET)
  - Summer (DST): UTC+2 (CEST)
- Postal code: 09246
- Website: http://www.quintanabureba.es/

Quintanabureba is a municipality and town located in the province of Burgos, Castile and León, Spain. According to the 2004 census (INE), the municipality has a population of 39 inhabitants.
