= Grisaleña =

Coordinates: 42°35′N 3°16′W

- Municipality and town
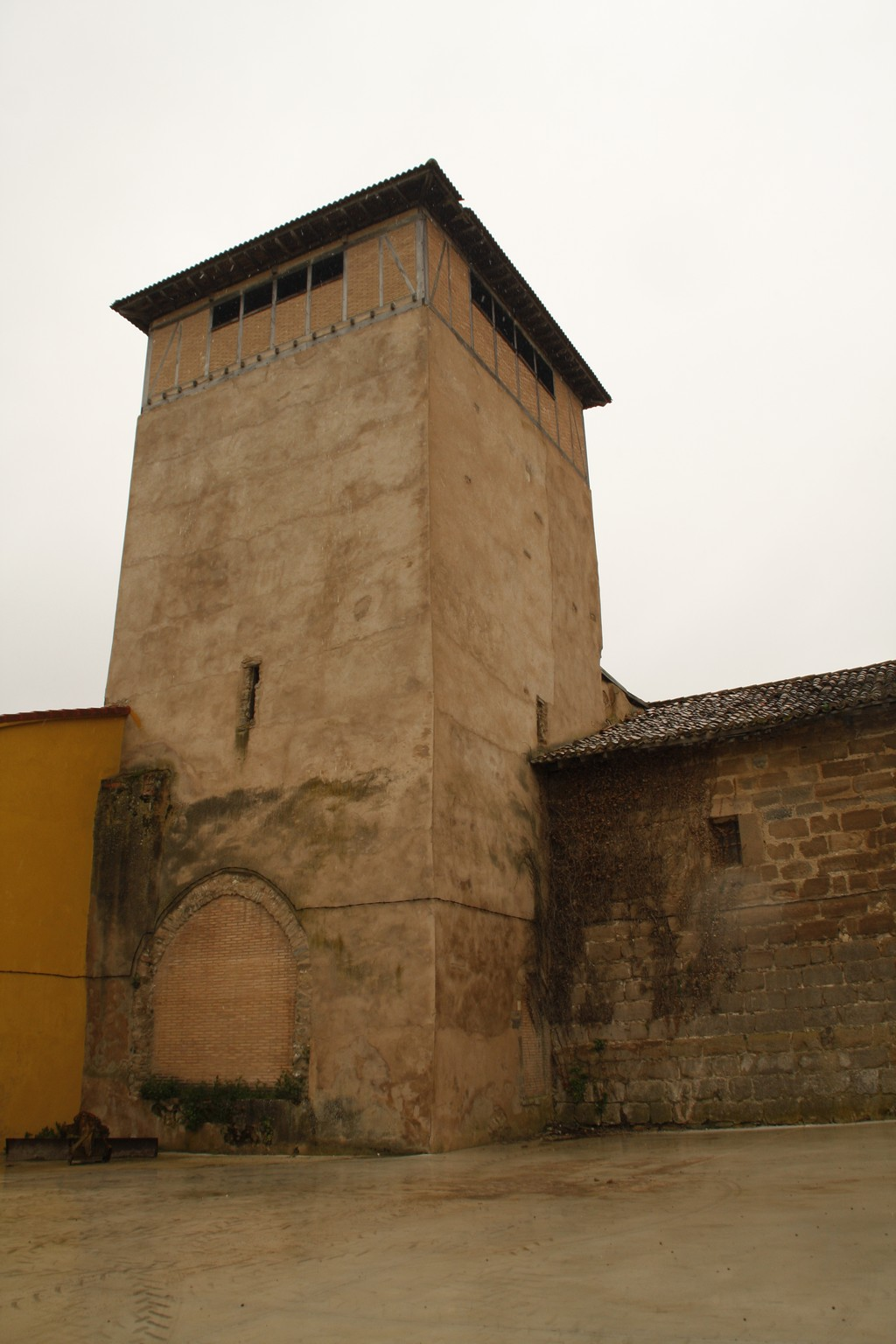
- Former Grisaleña's castle tower, now part of the town's church

- Coat of arms

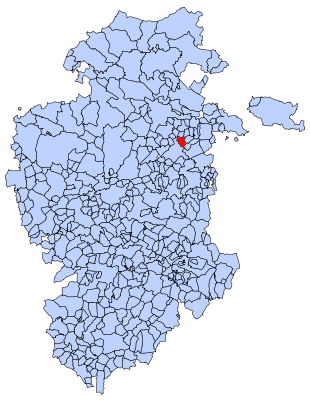
- Municipal location of Grisaleña in Burgos province
- Country: Spain
- Autonomous community: Castile and León
- Province: Burgos
- Comarca: La Bureba

Area
  - Total: 16.346 km^{2} (6.311 sq mi)
- Elevation: 743 m (2,438 ft)

Population (2025-01-01)
  - Total: 58
  - Density: 3.5/km^{2} (9.2/sq mi)
- Time zone: UTC+1 (CET)
  - Summer (DST): UTC+2 (CEST)
- Postal code: 09245
- Website: http://www.grisalena.es/

Grisaleña is a municipality located in the province of Burgos, Castile and León, Spain. According to the 2004 census (INE), the municipality had a population of 46 inhabitants.
