= Alcocero de Mola =

Coordinates: 42°28′N 3°21′W

- Municipality and town
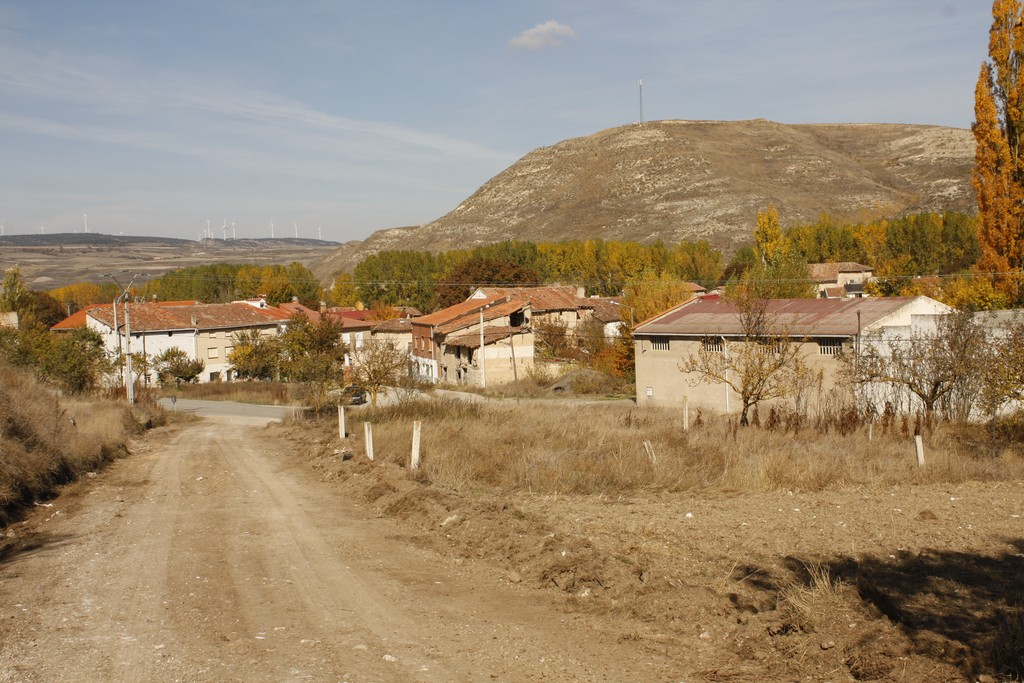
- View of Alcocero de Mola, 2009

- Coat of arms

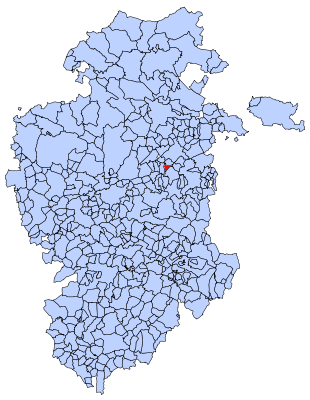
- Municipal location of Alcocero de Mola in Burgos province
- Country: Spain
- Autonomous community: Castile and León
- Province: Burgos
- Comarca: La Bureba

Area
  - Total: 8.33 km^{2} (3.22 sq mi)
- Elevation: 795 m (2,608 ft)

Population (2025-01-01)
  - Total: 40
  - Density: 4.8/km^{2} (12/sq mi)
- Time zone: UTC+1 (CET)
  - Summer (DST): UTC+2 (CEST)
- Postal code: 09258
- Website: http://www.alcocerodemola.es/

Alcocero de Mola is a municipality and town located in the province of Burgos, Castile and León, Spain. According to the 2004 census (INE), the municipality has a population of 53 inhabitants. The town was known only as Alcocero until 1938, when Francoist authorities renamed the village in honour of General Emilio Mola, who died in a plane crash near Alcocero on 3 June 1937.

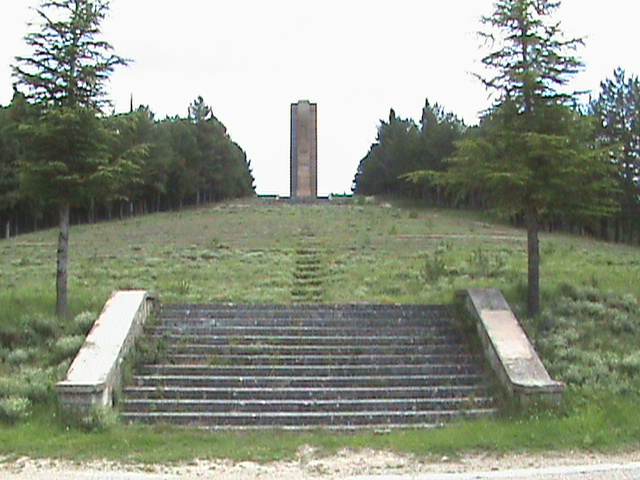
Monument erected in 1939 in memory of General Emilio Mola, who died in a plane crash near Alcocero in 1937.
