= Santa Olalla de Bureba =

Coordinates: 42°29′N 3°26′W

- Municipality and town
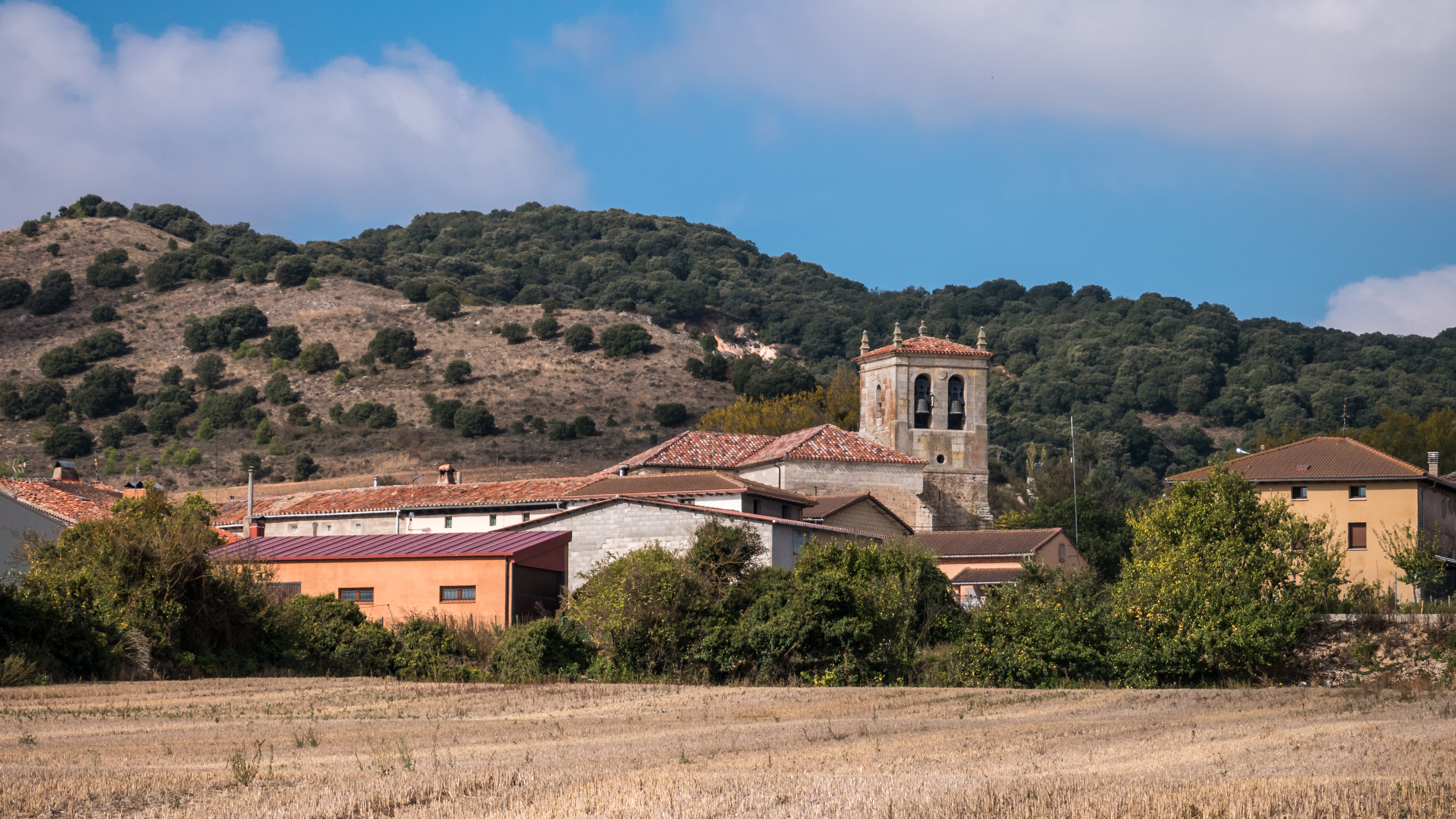

- Coat of arms

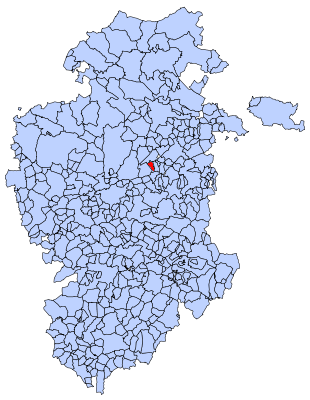
- Municipal location of Santa Olalla de Bureba in Burgos province
- Country: Spain
- Autonomous community: Castile and León
- Province: Burgos
- Comarca: La Bureba

Area
  - Total: 10 km^{2} (3.9 sq mi)

Population (2025-01-01)
  - Total: 38
  - Density: 3.8/km^{2} (9.8/sq mi)
- Time zone: UTC+1 (CET)
  - Summer (DST): UTC+2 (CEST)
- Postal code: 09292
- Website: http://www.santaolalladebureba.es/

Santa Olalla de Bureba is a municipality and town located in the province of Burgos, Castile and León, Spain. According to the 2004 census (INE), the municipality has a population of 33 inhabitants.

== Geography ==
In the corridor of La Bureba, 2 on the left bank of the Cerratón River, next to the towns of Monasterio and Quintanavides and enclosed by the route of the AP-1 that acts as a barrier together with the NI and the railway in its expansion waters up towards Santa María .

== Topography ==
The name of the locality, Santa Olaja, means "Santa Olalla or Eulalia". There are two other towns of the same name in the provinces of León and Palencia .

== History ==
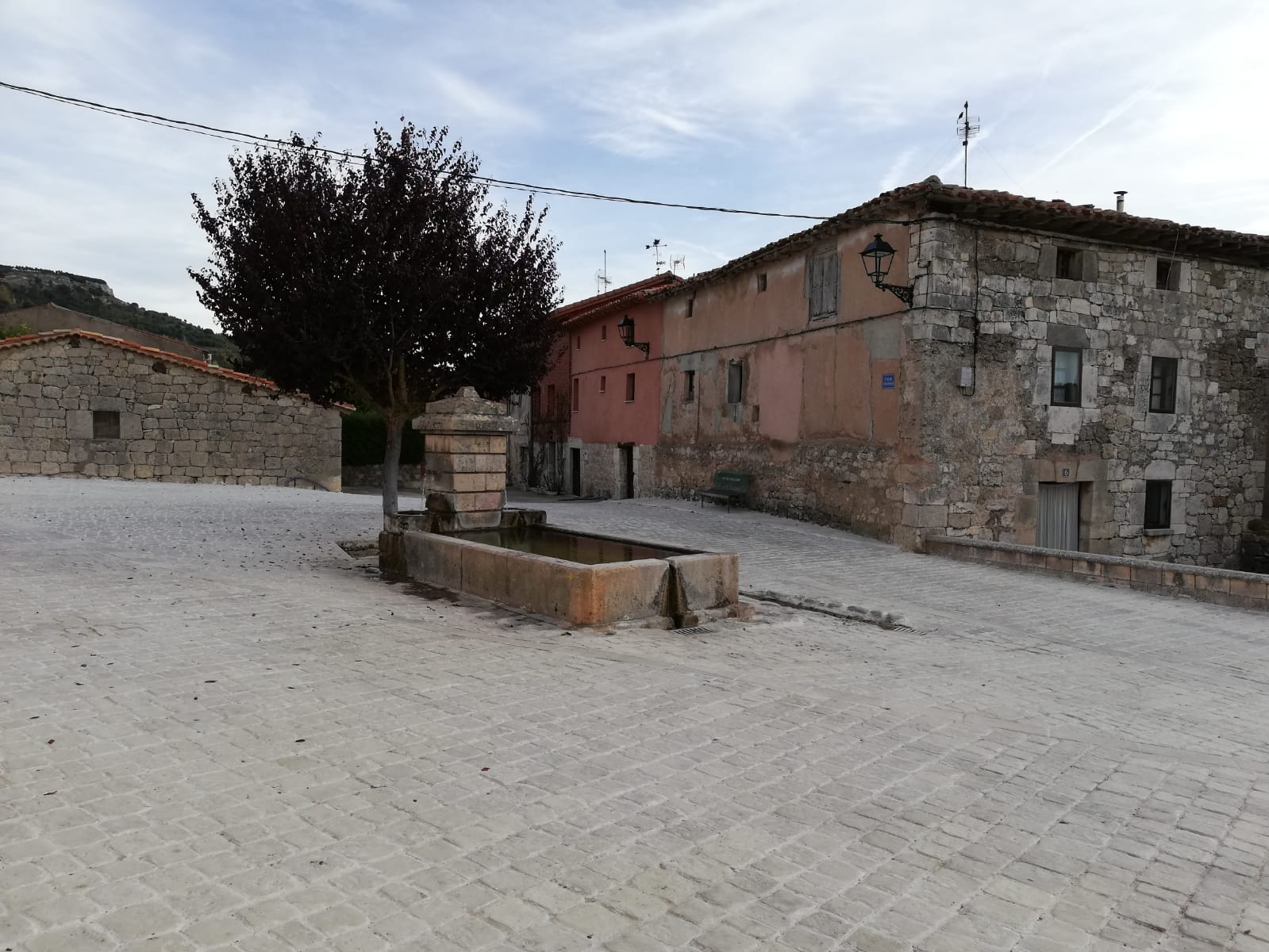
Constitution Square, Santa Olalla de Bureba.

The village of Santa Olalla de Bureba is located at the foot of La Brújula and bathed by the Ebro, although in a part of its term, which borders Caborredondo, flows into the River Douro. It owes its name to Saint Eulalia, a young woman who deserved the glory of martyrdom during the persecution of Diocletian at the beginning of the 4th century. The body of the saint was taken to Asturias in the wake of the Arab invasion and then guarded with all veneration in Oviedo, extending its devotion throughout the north of Spain in the centuries altomedievales. When the foramontanos arrived at these lands the group that founded this town, probably in the ninth century, after the foundation of Burgos (year 884), brought some relic of the saint and hence the name of the new town.

The Latin name of Eulalia is Olalla, and it was called Bureba to distinguish them from other populations that had the same name. The first written mention that makes reference to Santa Olalla de Bureba dates back to the year 1011, when Don Sancho I cites it in the founding document of the Monastery of San Salvador de Oña. The count of the Good Fueros, as he was known, made his daughter Tigridia abbess and lady of the same and gave to the monastery the half of the property that it owned in Santa Olalla de Bureba. One hundred years later there is evidence of the existence of another villa, Villasuso, in the current term of Santa Olalla, located in a payment that still maintains the same name. On the other hand, a powerful lady named Dona Estefanía donates her property to the Monastery of Oña, property including the haciendas she owned in Villasuso.

Later Santa Olalla de Bureba absorbs Villasuso with its neighbors and territory. Years later, in 1146, Emperor Alfonso VII granted the town of Cerezo de Río Tirón a charter whose articles extended to a long list of villas, including Santa Olalla de Bureba. The benefits of the law were mainly related to the administration of justice, the exemption of some taxes and the obtaining of some privileges of pasture, portazgo and pontazgo. During the medieval and modern times the population of Santa Olalla de Bureba was not high; in century XIII it appears in the relation of loans of the diocese of Burgos with 13 maravedises, which supposes that its population did not happen of a hundred inhabitants. Already in the year 1591 the population had doubled; whereas in the year 1843 it has 144 inhabitants. Their neighbors lived on the exploitation of their flax crops and a jasper quarry. Also, already in the eighteenth century, when Santa Olalla de Bureba appears in the Prádanos group, one of the seven in which the Bureba was divided, they began to take advantage of the Camino Real from Madrid to France.

In the 19th century, the railroad arrived and, halfway through the century, the single-track train from Madrid to Paris already operated. In the twentieth century the term of Santa Olalla de Bureba is an obligatory step of all service networks between the upper plateau, the Ebro Valley and Europe, so by its municipal district-geography-passes a gas pipeline, an oil pipeline, the National Highway I, the railroad, the Burgos-Málzaga highway, the Camino de Santiago, the Quintanavides highway ... This service capacity has benefited the town of Santa Olalla de Bureba very much economically and socially, which, on the other hand, It has also suffered a large population decline due to industrial evolution.
