= Cascajares de Bureba =

Coordinates: 42°41′N 3°14′W

- Municipality
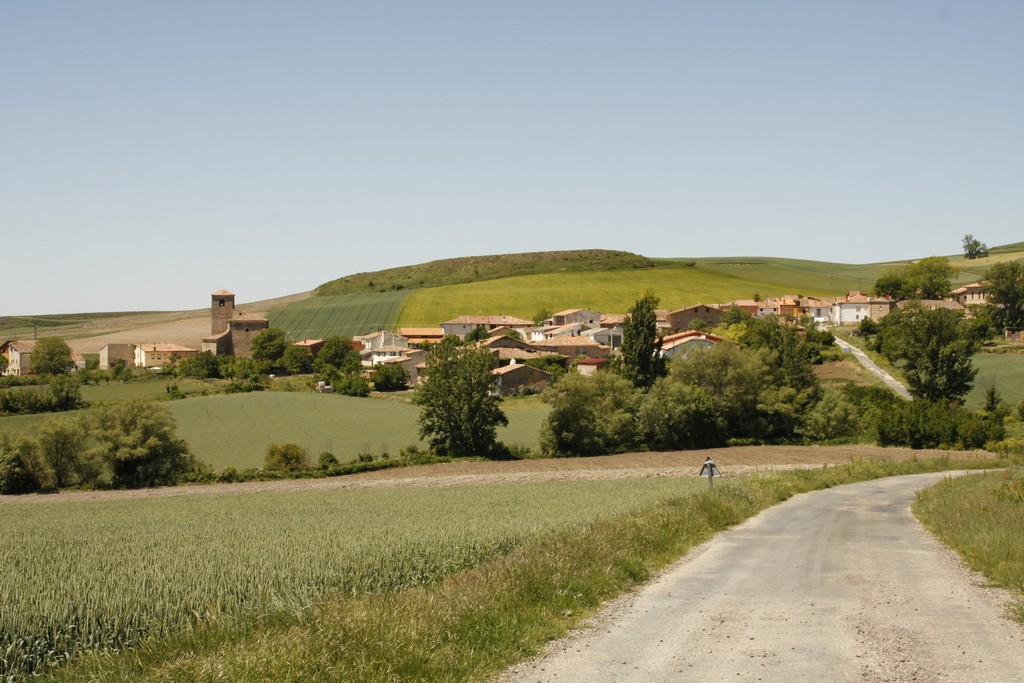
- View of Cascajares de Bureba, 2010

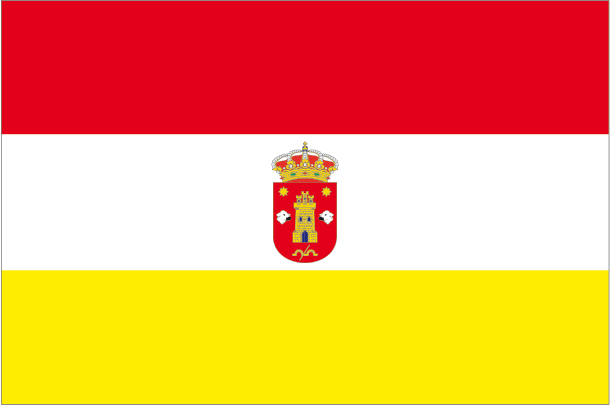
- Flag Coat of arms

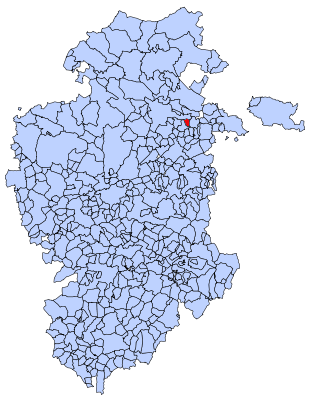
- Municipal location of Cascajares de Bureba in Burgos province
- Country: Spain
- Autonomous community: Castile and León
- Province: Burgos
- Comarca: La Bureba

Area
  - Total: 7 km^{2} (2.7 sq mi)

Population (2025-01-01)
  - Total: 25
  - Density: 3.6/km^{2} (9.2/sq mi)
- Time zone: UTC+1 (CET)
  - Summer (DST): UTC+2 (CEST)
- Postal code: 09280
- Website: http://www.cascajaresdebureba.es/

Cascajares de Bureba is a municipality located in the province of Burgos, Castile and León, Spain. According to the 2004 census (INE), the municipality had a population of 54 inhabitants.
