= Piérnigas =

Coordinates: 42°35′N 3°24′W

- Municipality and town
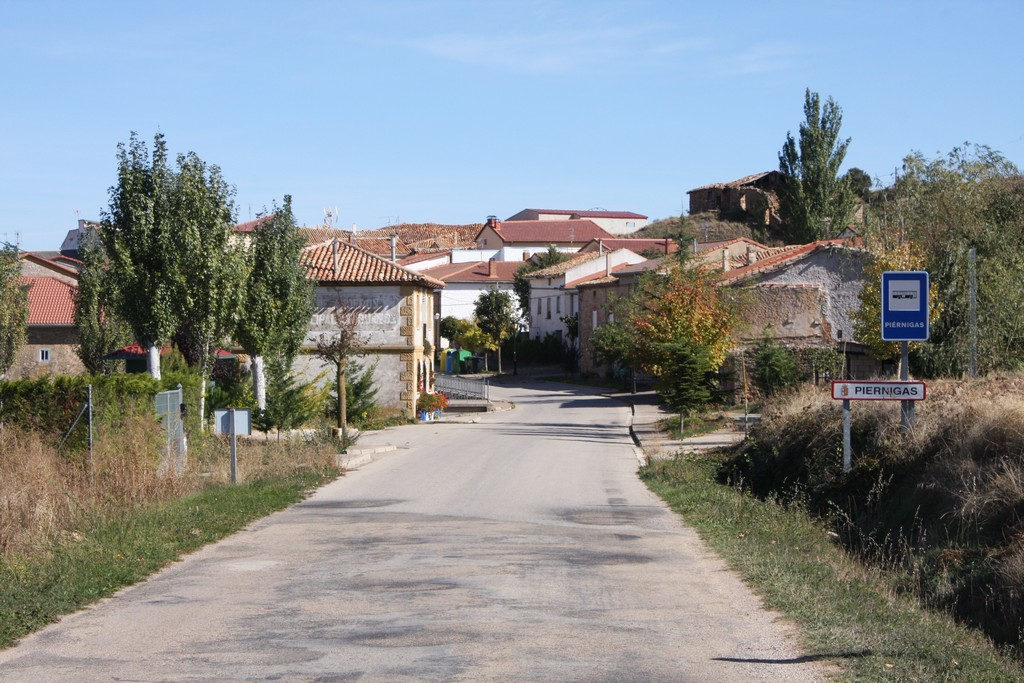
- View of Piérnigas, 2009

- Flag Coat of arms

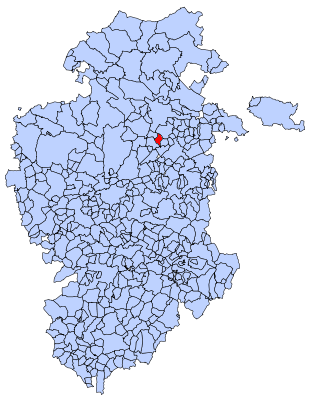
- Municipal location of Piérnigas in Burgos province
- Country: Spain
- Autonomous community: Castile and León
- Province: Burgos
- Comarca: La Bureba
- Founded: 26 August 1066

Area
  - Total: 13 km^{2} (5.0 sq mi)
- Elevation: 729 m (2,392 ft)

Population (2025-01-01)
  - Total: 43
  - Density: 3.3/km^{2} (8.6/sq mi)
- Time zone: UTC+1 (CET)
  - Summer (DST): UTC+2 (CEST)
- Postal code: 09246
- Website: http://www.piernigas.es/

Piérnigas is a municipality and town located in the province of Burgos, Castile and León, Spain. According to the 2004 census (INE), the municipality has a population of 38 inhabitants.
