= Abajas =

- Municipality and town
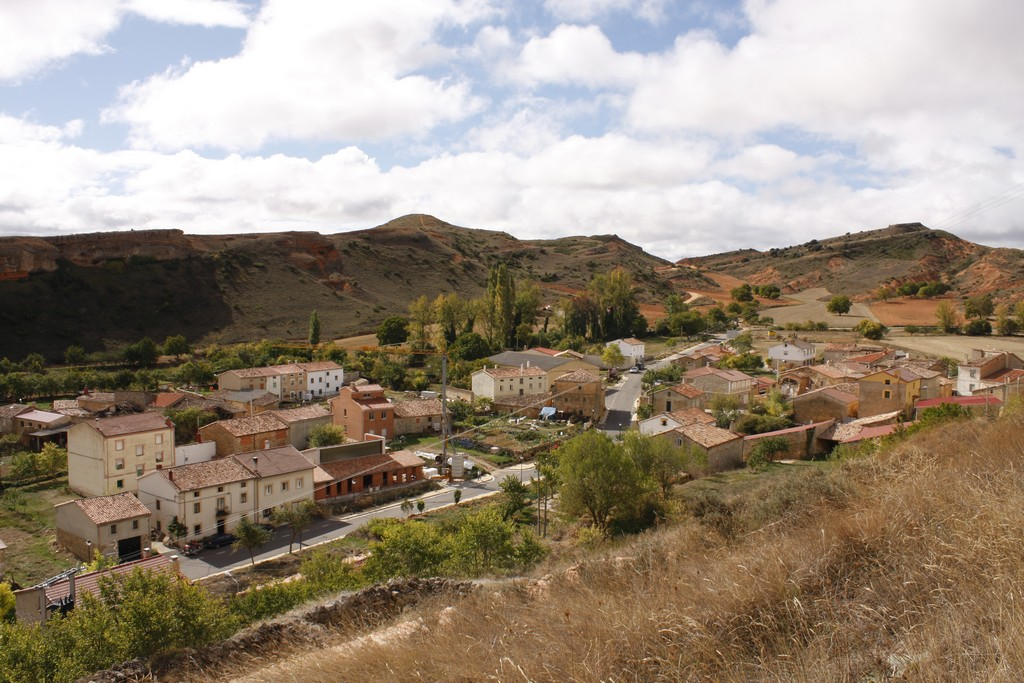
- View of Abajas, 2009

- Coat of arms

- Location within Castile and León Location within Spain
- Coordinates: 42°37′24″N 3°34′4″W
- Country: Spain
- Autonomous community: Castile and León
- Province: Burgos
- Comarca: La Bureba

Area
  - Total: 35.07 km^{2} (13.54 sq mi)
- Elevation: 839 m (2,753 ft)

Population (2025-01-01)
  - Total: 28
  - Density: 0.80/km^{2} (2.1/sq mi)
- Time zone: UTC+1 (CET)
  - Summer (DST): UTC+2 (CEST)
- Postal code: 09141
- Website: http://www.abajas.es/

Abajas is a municipality and town located in the province of Burgos, Castile and León, Spain. According to the 2004 census (INE), the municipality has a population of 41 inhabitants.
