= La Vid de Bureba =

- Municipality and town
- Coat of arms

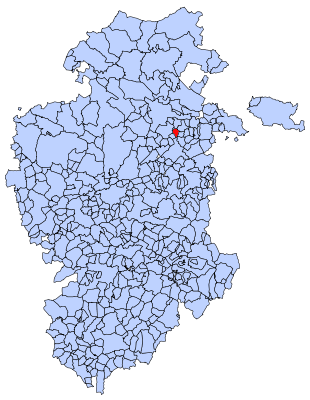
- Municipal location of La Vid de Bureba in Burgos province
- Coordinates: 42°38′N 3°18′W
- Country: Spain
- Autonomous community: Castile and León
- Province: Burgos
- Comarca: La Bureba

Area
  - Total: 9 km^{2} (3.5 sq mi)
- Elevation: 696 m (2,283 ft)

Population (2025-01-01)
  - Total: 26
  - Density: 2.9/km^{2} (7.5/sq mi)
- Time zone: UTC+1 (CET)
  - Summer (DST): UTC+2 (CEST)
- Postal code: 09249
- Website: www.laviddebureba.es

La Vid de Bureba is a municipality located in the province of Burgos, Castile and León, Spain. According to the 2004 census (INE), the municipality has a population of 30 inhabitants.
