= Monasterio de Rodilla =

Coordinates: 42°27′N 3°28′W

- Municipality
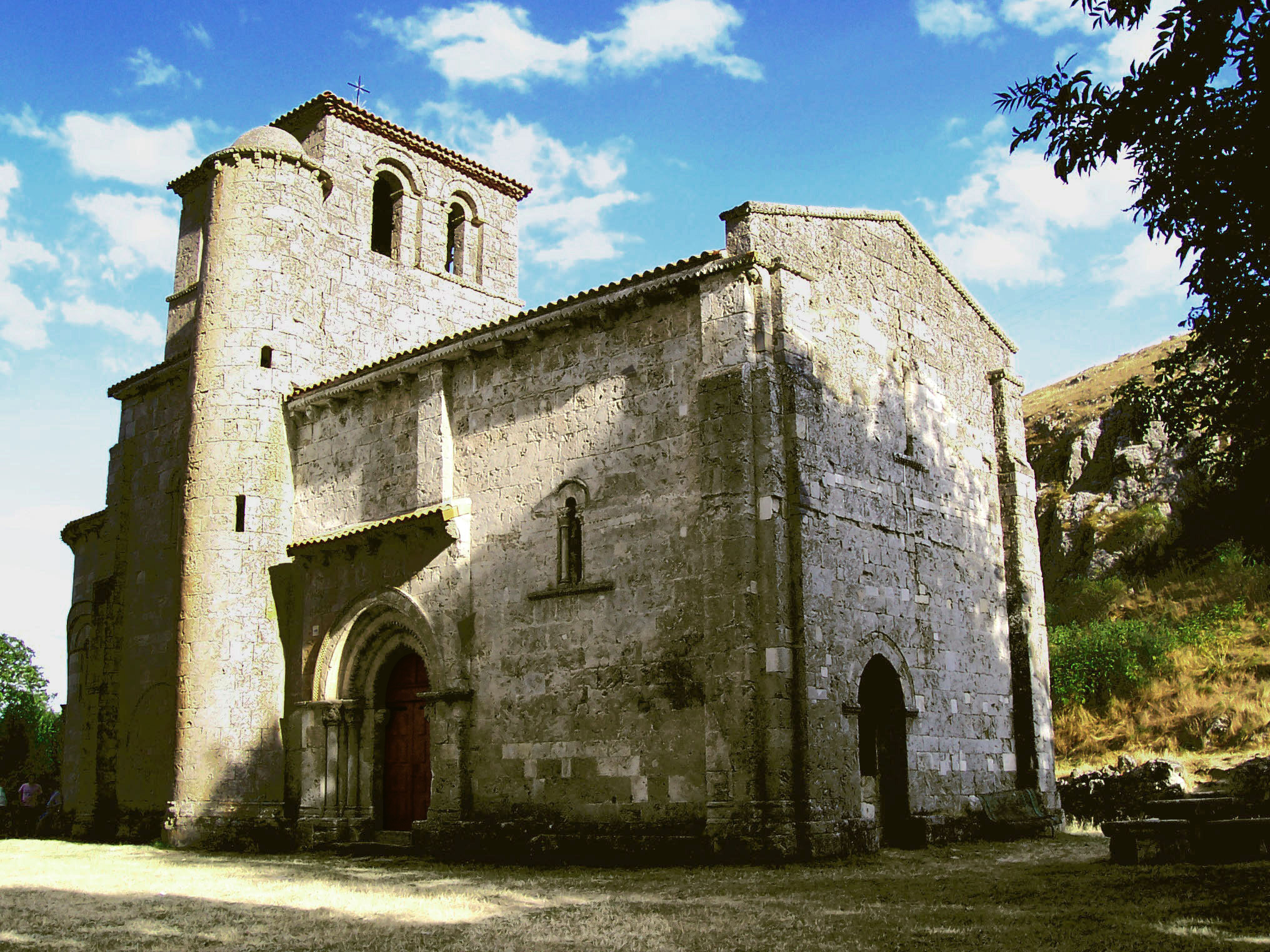
- Nuestra Señora del Valle basilica (12th century)

- Flag Coat of arms

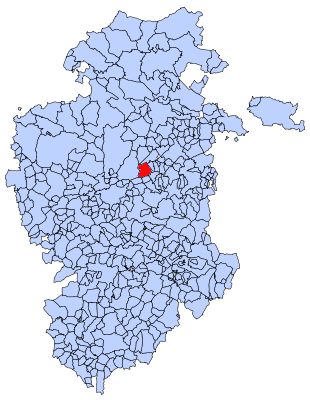
- Municipal location of Monasterio de Rodilla in Burgos province
- Country: Spain
- Autonomous community: Castile and León
- Province: Burgos
- Comarca: La Bureba

Area
  - Total: 37 km^{2} (14 sq mi)
- Elevation: 926 m (3,038 ft)

Population (2025-01-01)
  - Total: 171
  - Density: 4.6/km^{2} (12/sq mi)
- Time zone: UTC+1 (CET)
  - Summer (DST): UTC+2 (CEST)
- Postal code: 09292
- Website: http://www.monasterioderodilla.es/

Monasterio de Rodilla is a municipality and town located in the province of Burgos, Castile and León, Spain. According to the 2004 census (INE), the municipality has a population of 224 inhabitants.
