= Rojas, Province of Burgos =

Rojas
- Municipality and town
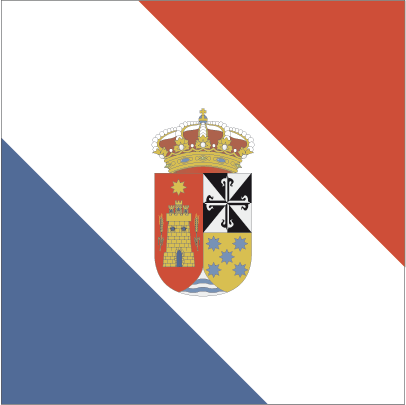
- Flag Coat of arms

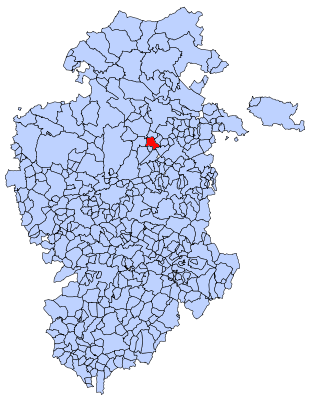
- Municipal location of Rojas in Burgos province
- Coordinates: 42°34′39″N 3°26′27″W
- Country: Spain
- Autonomous community: Castile and León
- Province: Burgos
- Comarca: La Bureba

Area
  - Total: 24.9 km^{2} (9.6 sq mi)
  - Land: 23.453 km^{2} (9.055 sq mi)
- Elevation: 722 m (2,369 ft)

Population (2025-01-01)
  - Total: 62
  - Density: 2.6/km^{2} (6.8/sq mi)
- Time zone: UTC+1 (CET)
  - Summer (DST): UTC+2 (CEST)
- Postal code: 09246
- Website: http://www.rojas.es

Rojas is a municipality and town located in the province of Burgos, Castile and León, Spain.
