= Padrones de Bureba =

Coordinates: 42°42′N 3°32′W

- Municipality and town
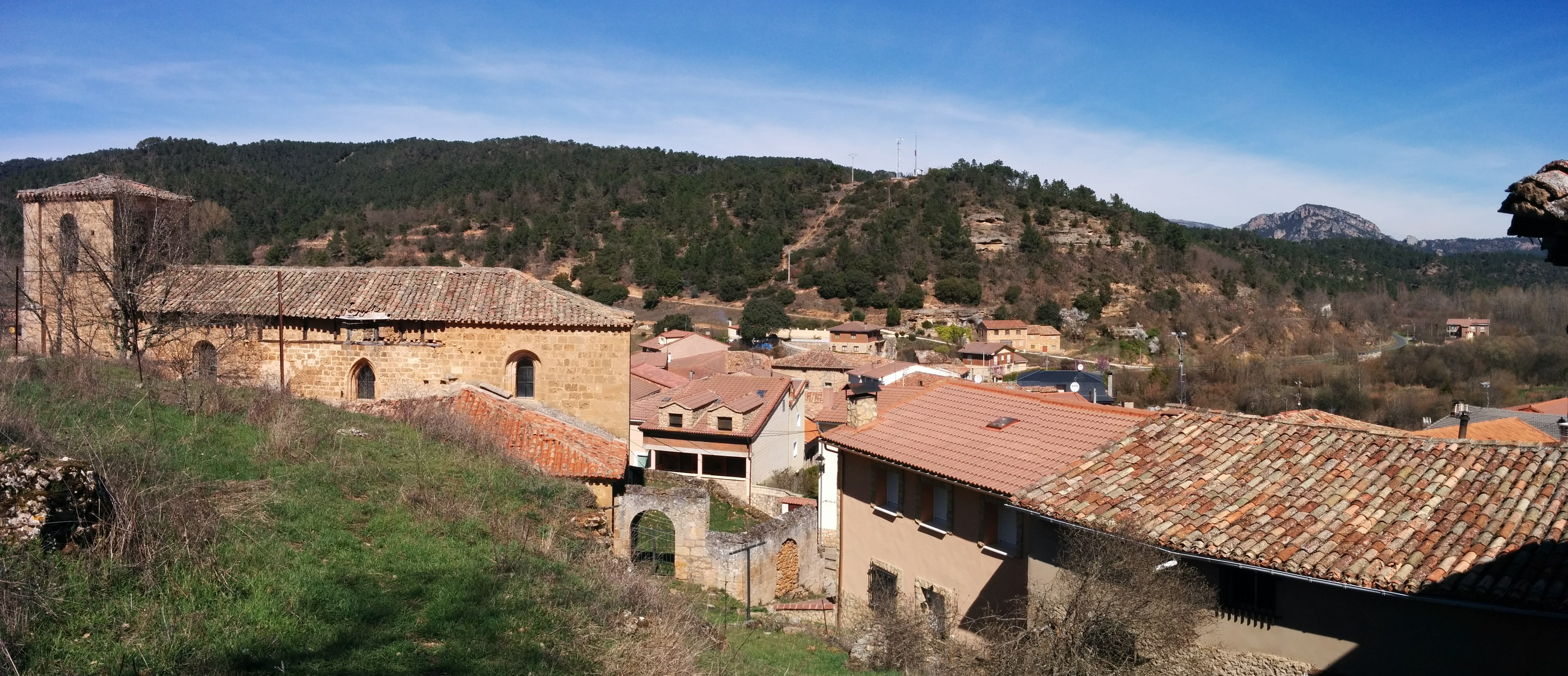
- View of Padrones de Bureba, 2017

- Flag Coat of arms

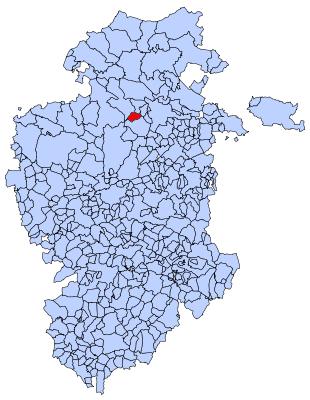
- Municipal location of Padrones de Bureba in Burgos province
- Country: Spain
- Autonomous community: Castile and León
- Province: Burgos
- Comarca: La Bureba

Area
  - Total: 20 km^{2} (7.7 sq mi)
- Elevation: 785 m (2,575 ft)

Population (2025-01-01)
  - Total: 49
  - Density: 2.5/km^{2} (6.3/sq mi)
- Time zone: UTC+1 (CET)
  - Summer (DST): UTC+2 (CEST)
- Postal code: 09593
- Website: http://www.padronesdebureba.es/

Padrones de Bureba is a municipality and town located in the province of Burgos, Castile and León, Spain. According to the 2004 census (INE), the municipality has a population of 59 inhabitants.
