= Quintanavides =

Coordinates: 42°29′N 3°25′W

- Municipality and town
- Flag Coat of arms

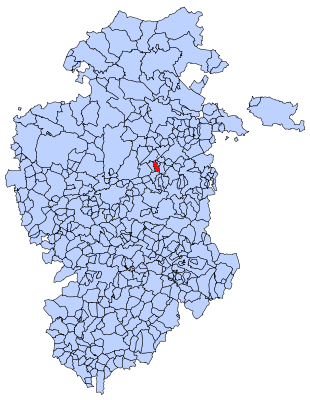
- Municipal map of Quintanavides in Burgos province
- Country: Spain
- Autonomous community: Castile and León
- Province: Burgos
- Comarca: La Bureba

Area
  - Total: 11.67 km^{2} (4.51 sq mi)
- Elevation: 825 m (2,707 ft)

Population (2025-01-01)
  - Total: 65
  - Density: 5.6/km^{2} (14/sq mi)
- Time zone: UTC+1 (CET)
  - Summer (DST): UTC+2 (CEST)
- Postal code: 09292
- Website: http://www.quintanavides.es/

Quintanavides is a municipality and town located in the province of Burgos, Castile and León, Spain. According to the 2004 census (INE), the municipality has a population of 118 inhabitants.
