= Santa María Ribarredonda =

Coordinates: 42°38′24″N 3°10′48″W

- Municipality and town
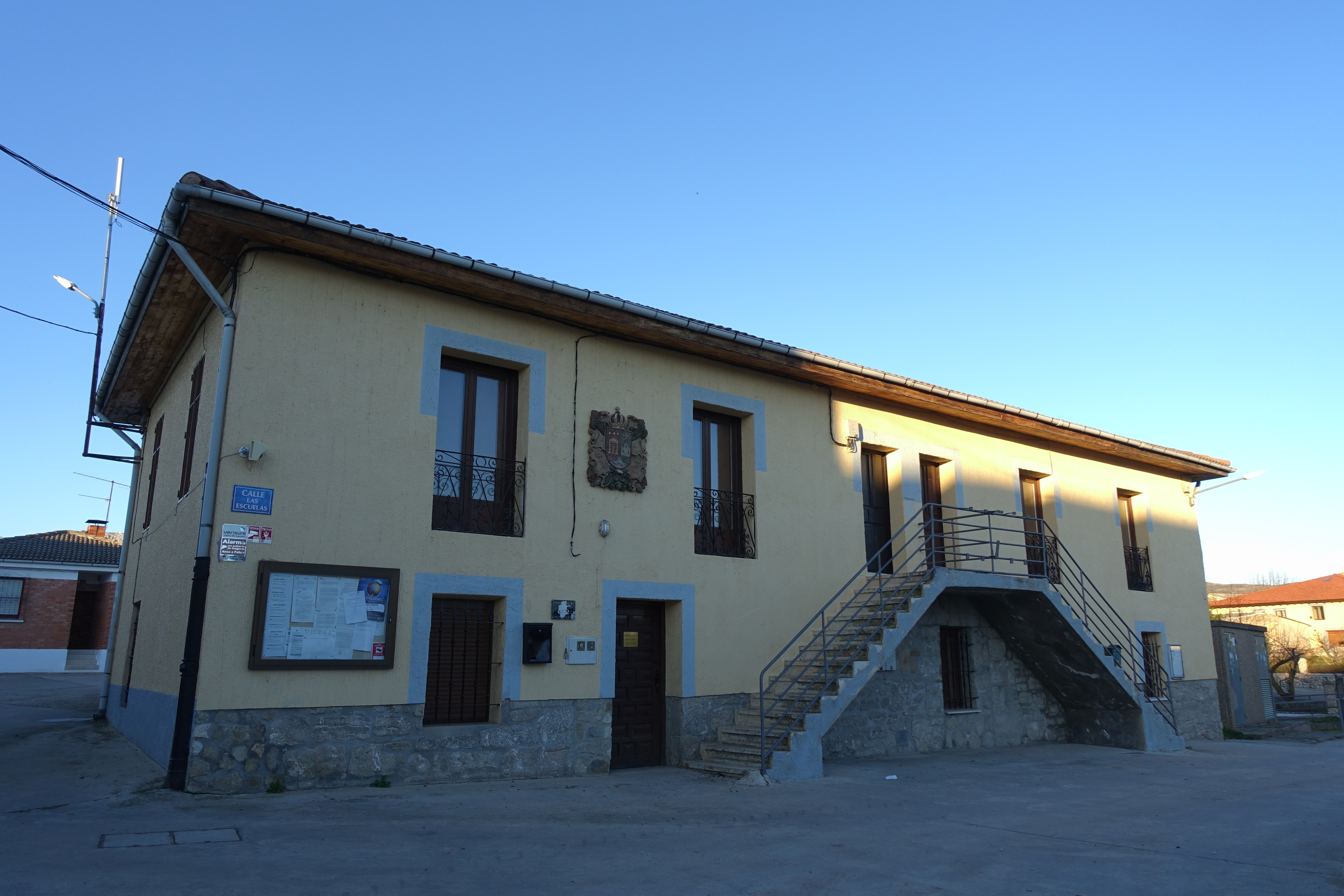
- Town hall

- Flag Coat of arms
- Interactive map of Santa María Ribarredonda
- Country: Spain
- Autonomous community: Castile and León
- Province: Burgos
- Comarca: La Bureba

Area
  - Total: 11.01 km^{2} (4.25 sq mi)
- Elevation: 694 m (2,277 ft)

Population (2025-01-01)
  - Total: 97
  - Density: 8.8/km^{2} (23/sq mi)
- Time zone: UTC+1 (CET)
  - Summer (DST): UTC+2 (CEST)
- Postal code: 09219
- Website: http://www.santamariaribarredonda.es/

Santa María Ribarredonda is a municipality and town located in the province of Burgos, Castile and León, Spain. According to the 2004 census (INE), the municipality has a population of 120 inhabitants.
