= Rublacedo de Abajo =

Coordinates: 42°33′N 3°30′W

- Municipality and town
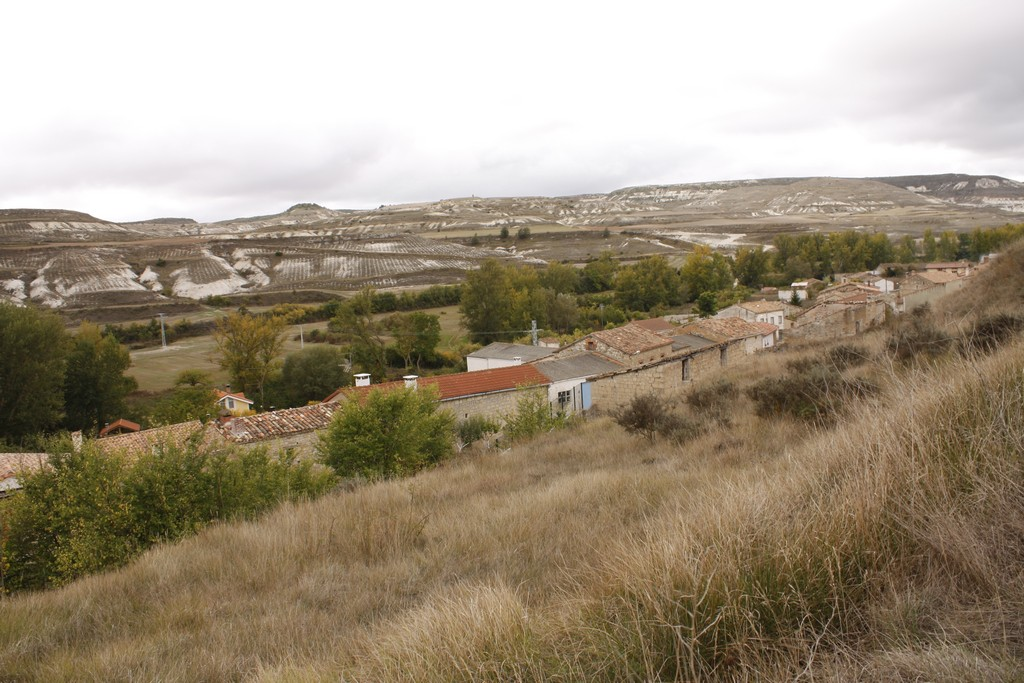
- View of Rublacedo de Abajo, 2009

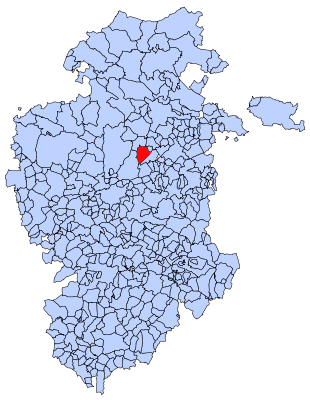
- Municipal location of Rublacedo de Abajo in Burgos province
- Country: Spain
- Autonomous community: Castile and León
- Province: Burgos
- Comarca: La Bureba

Area
  - Total: 39.30 km^{2} (15.17 sq mi)
- Elevation: 800 m (2,600 ft)

Population (2025-01-01)
  - Total: 37
  - Density: 0.94/km^{2} (2.4/sq mi)
- Time zone: UTC+1 (CET)
  - Summer (DST): UTC+2 (CEST)
- Postal code: 09593
- Website: http://www.rublacedodeabajo.es/

Rublacedo de Abajo is a municipality located in the province of Burgos, Castile and León, Spain. According to the 2004 census (INE), the municipality has a population of 40 inhabitants.
