= Bañuelos de Bureba =

Coordinates: 42°30′N 3°17′W

- Municipality and town
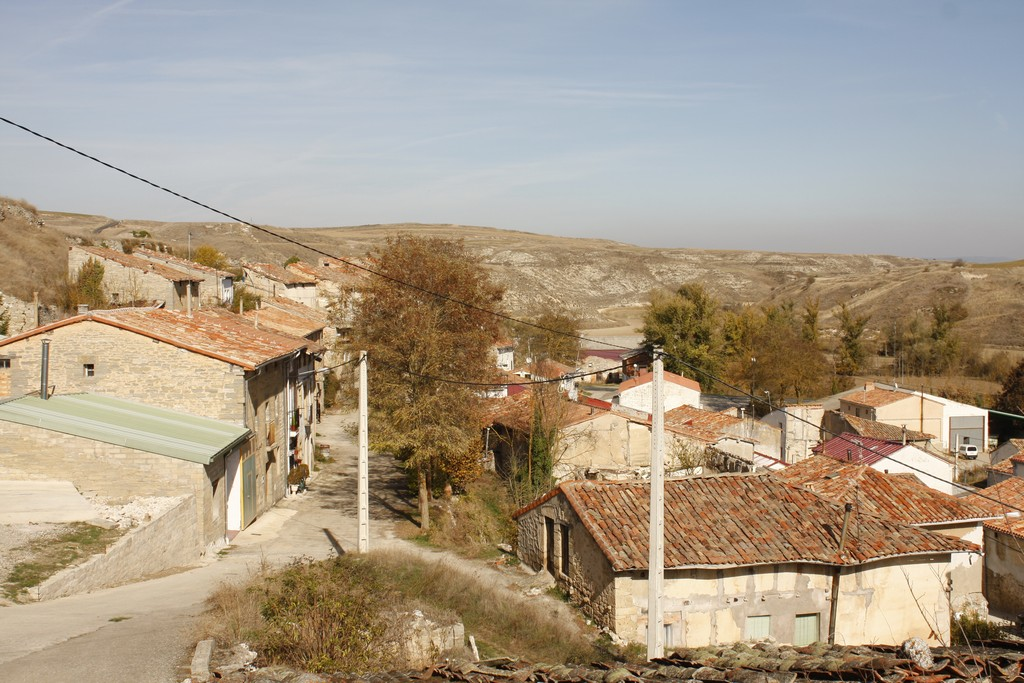
- View of Bañuelos de Bureba, 2009

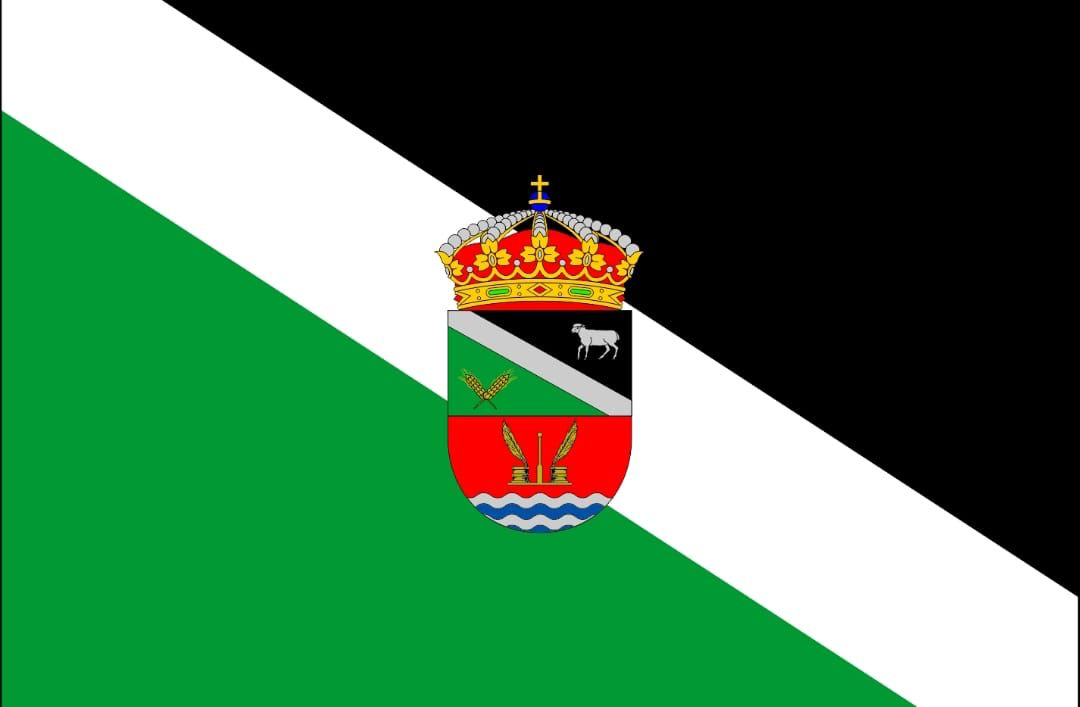
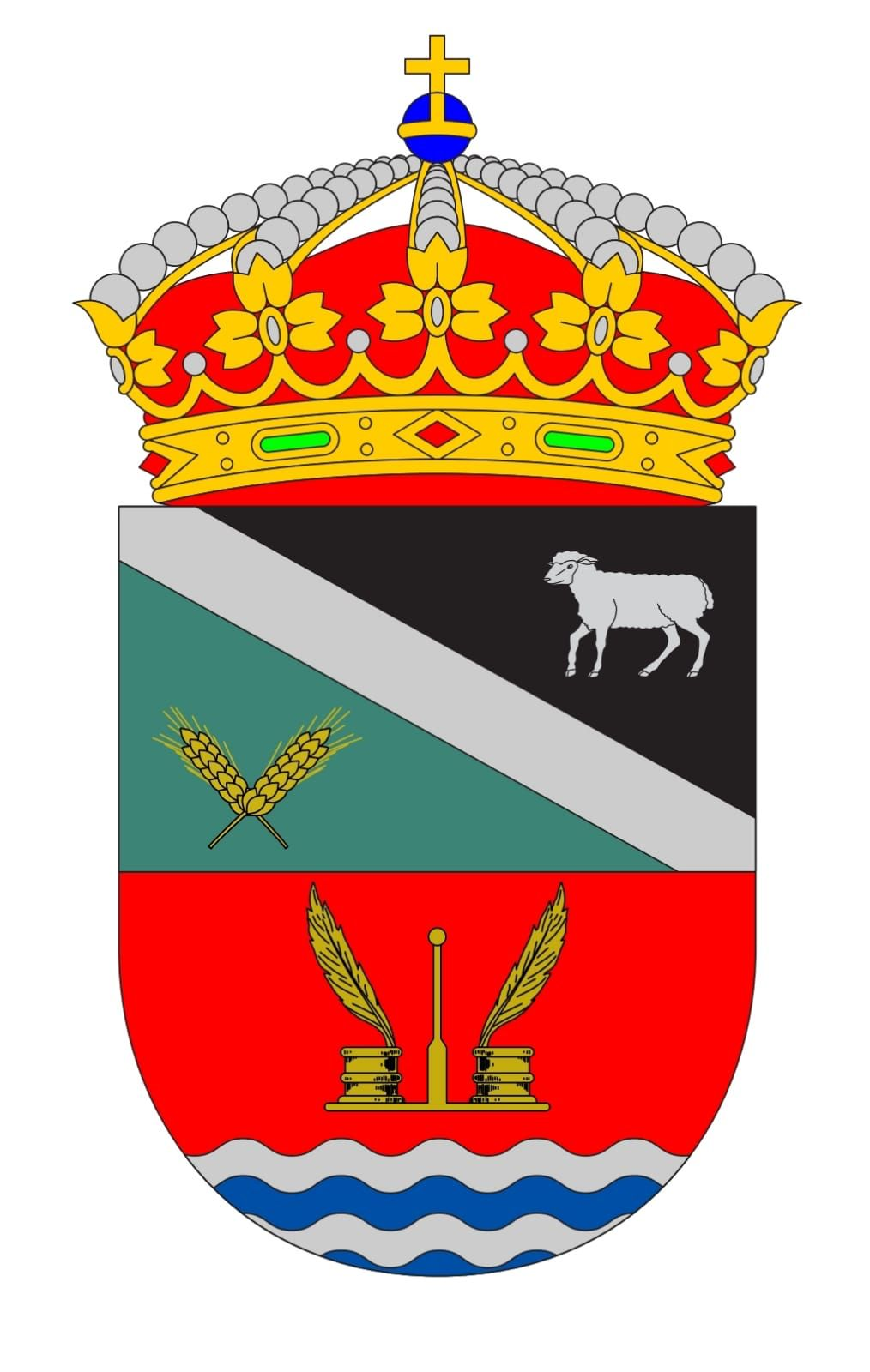
- Flag Coat of arms

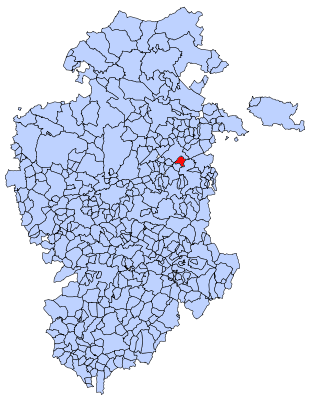
- Municipal location of Bañuelos de Bureba in Burgos province
- Country: Spain
- Autonomous community: Castile and León
- Province: Burgos
- Comarca: La Bureba

Area
  - Total: 15 km^{2} (5.8 sq mi)
- Elevation: 799 m (2,621 ft)

Population (2025-01-01)
  - Total: 32
  - Density: 2.1/km^{2} (5.5/sq mi)
- Time zone: UTC+1 (CET)
  - Summer (DST): UTC+2 (CEST)
- Postal code: 09248
- Website: https://web.archive.org/web/20130714173539/http://xn--bauelosdebureba-zqb.es/

Bañuelos de Bureba (Spanish pronunciation: [baˈɲwelos ðe βuˈɾeβa]) is a municipality and town located in the province of Burgos, Castile and León, Spain. According to the 2012 census (INE), the municipality has a population of 27 inhabitants.
