= Navas de Bureba =

Coordinates: 42°41′N 3°19′W

- Municipality
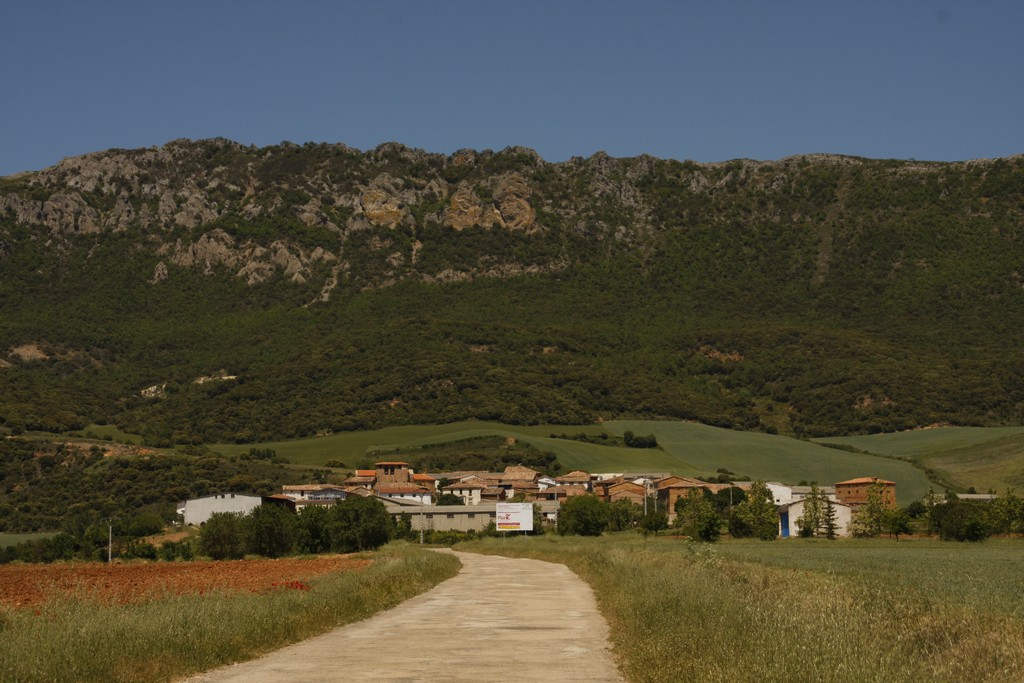
- View of Navas de Bureba, 2010

- Coat of arms

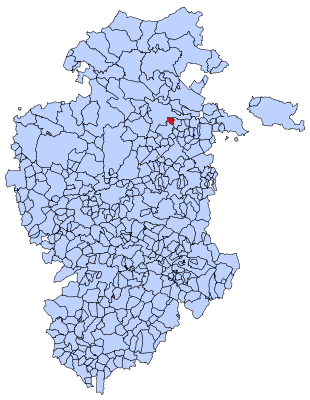
- Municipal location of Navas de Bureba in Burgos province
- Country: Spain
- Autonomous community: Castile and León
- Province: Burgos
- Comarca: La Bureba

Area
  - Total: 8 km^{2} (3.1 sq mi)
- Elevation: 770 m (2,530 ft)

Population (2025-01-01)
  - Total: 24
  - Density: 3.0/km^{2} (7.8/sq mi)
- Time zone: UTC+1 (CET)
  - Summer (DST): UTC+2 (CEST)
- Postal code: 09249
- Website: http://www.navasdebureba.es/

Navas de Bureba is a municipality and town located in the province of Burgos, Castile and León, Spain. According to the 2022 census (INE), the municipality has a population of 27 inhabitants.
