= Aguilar de Bureba =

Coordinates: 42°35′N 3°20′W

- Municipality and town
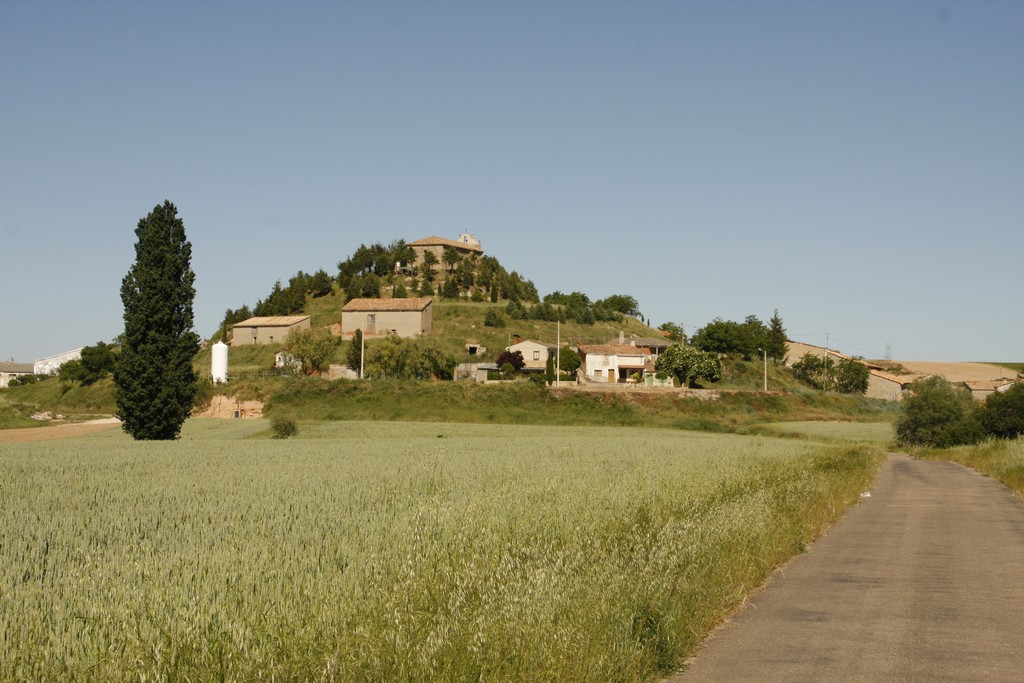
- View of Aguilar de Bureba, 2010

- Coat of arms

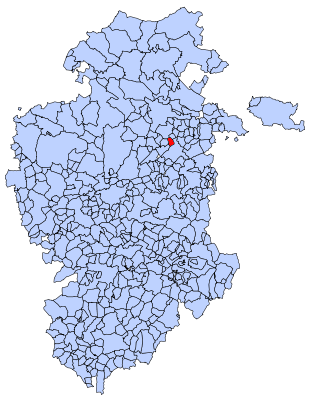
- Municipal location of Aguilar de Bureba in Burgos province
- Country: Spain
- Autonomous community: Castile and León
- Province: Burgos
- Comarca: La Bureba

Area
  - Total: 9.45 km^{2} (3.65 sq mi)
- Elevation: 683 m (2,241 ft)

Population (2025-01-01)
  - Total: 46
  - Density: 4.9/km^{2} (13/sq mi)
- Time zone: UTC+1 (CET)
  - Summer (DST): UTC+2 (CEST)
- Postal code: 09249
- Website: https://www.aguilardebureba.es/

Aguilar de Bureba is a municipality and town located in the province of Burgos, Castile and León, Spain. According to the 2004 census (INE), the municipality has a population of 75 inhabitants.
