= Carrias =

Coordinates: 42°29′N 3°17′W

- Municipality
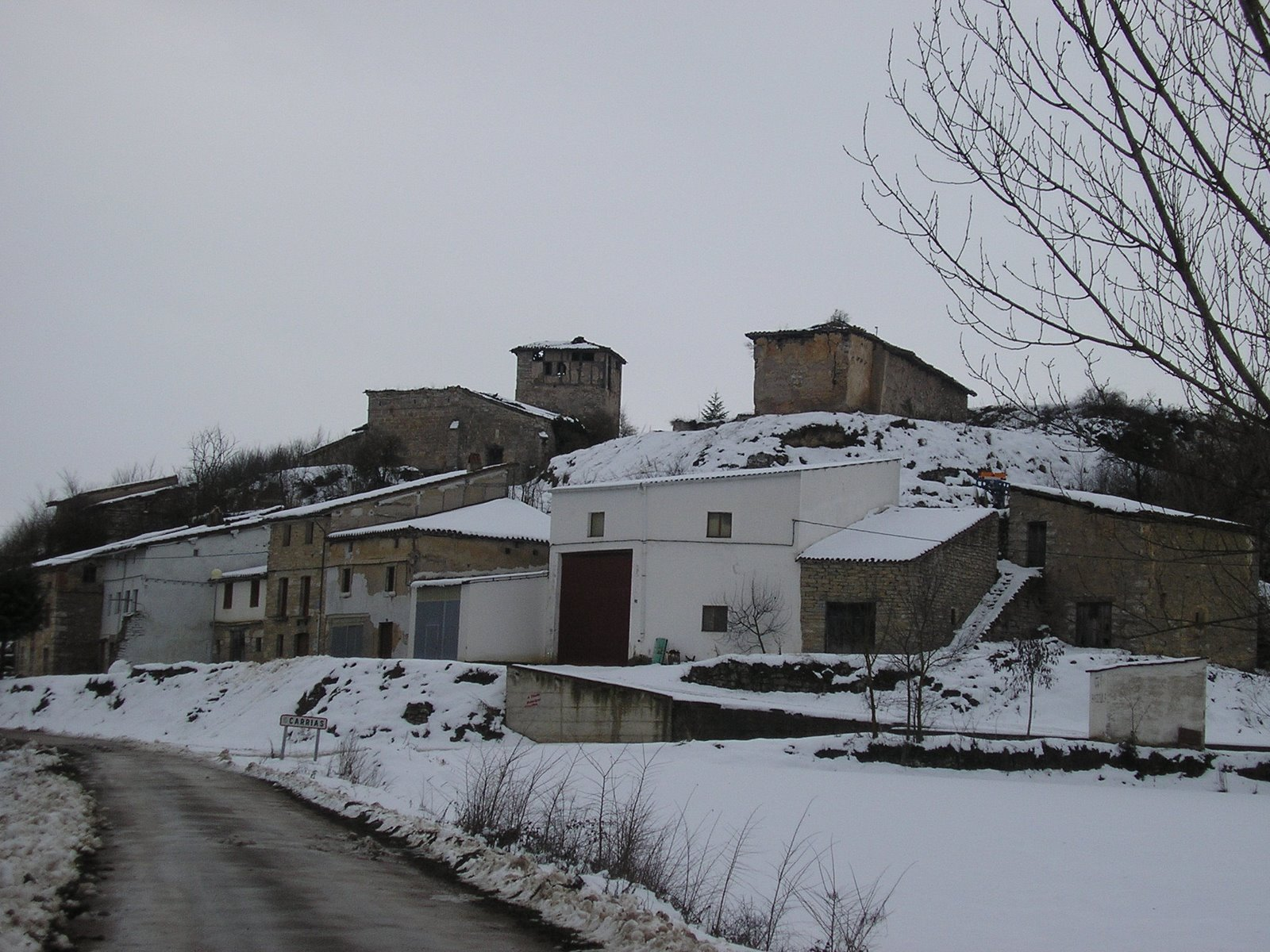
- View of Carrias covered by snow, 2004

- Flag Coat of arms

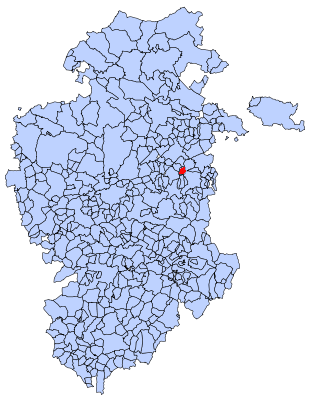
- Municipal location of Carrias in Burgos province
- Country: Spain
- Autonomous community: Castile and León
- Province: Burgos
- Comarca: La Bureba

Area
  - Total: 13 km^{2} (5.0 sq mi)
- Elevation: 838 m (2,749 ft)

Population (2025-01-01)
  - Total: 26
  - Density: 2.0/km^{2} (5.2/sq mi)
- Time zone: UTC+1 (CET)
  - Summer (DST): UTC+2 (CEST)
- Postal code: 09248
- Website: http://www.carrias.es/

Carrias is a municipality located in the province of Burgos, Castile and León, Spain. According to the 2013 census (INE), the municipality has a population of 26 inhabitants.
