= Los Barrios de Bureba =

Coordinates: 42°39′N 3°23′W

- Municipality
- Coat of arms

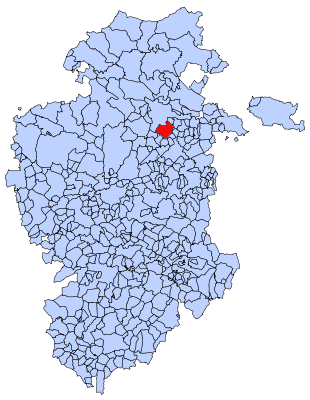
- Municipal location of Los Barrios de Bureba in Burgos province
- Country: Spain
- Autonomous community: Castile and León
- Province: Burgos
- Comarca: La Bureba

Area
  - Total: 46 km^{2} (18 sq mi)
- Elevation: 633 m (2,077 ft)

Population (2025-01-01)
  - Total: 179
  - Density: 3.9/km^{2} (10/sq mi)
- Time zone: UTC+1 (CET)
  - Summer (DST): UTC+2 (CEST)
- Postal code: 09249
- Website: http://www.losbarriosdebureba.es/

Los Barrios de Bureba is a municipality located in the province of Burgos, Castile and León, Spain. According to the 2004 census (INE), the municipality has a population of 243 inhabitants.
