= Carcedo de Bureba =

Coordinates: 42°35′N 3°30′W

- Municipality
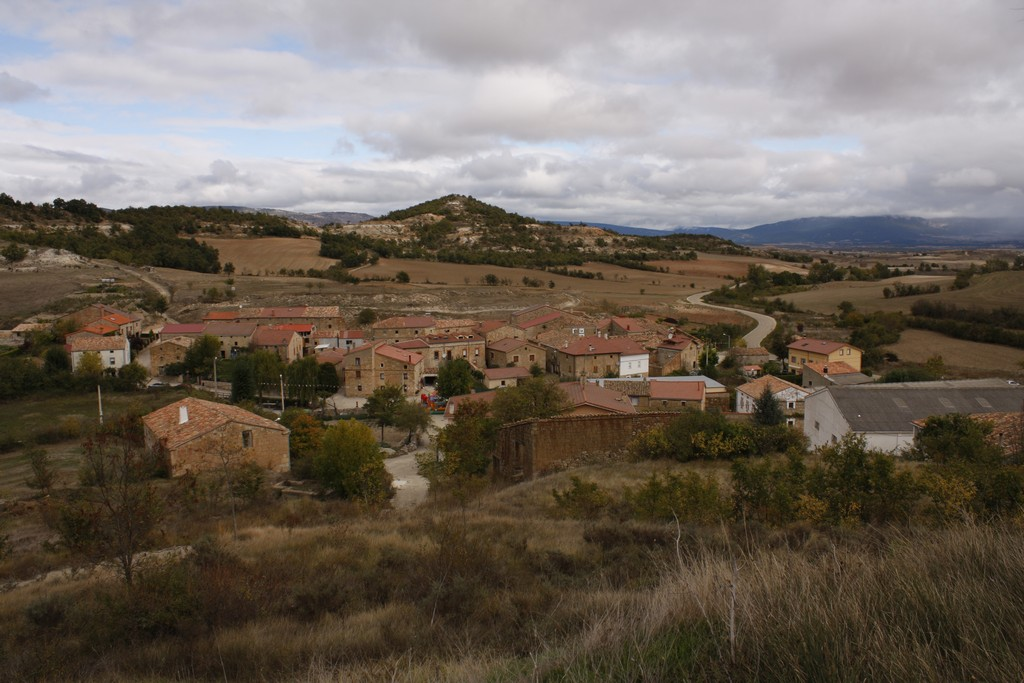
- View of Carcedo de Bureba, 2009
- Interactive map of Carcedo de Bureba
- Country: Spain
- Autonomous community: Castile and León
- Province: Burgos
- Comarca: La Bureba

Area
  - Total: 42.66 km^{2} (16.47 sq mi)
- Elevation: 780 m (2,560 ft)

Population (2025-01-01)
  - Total: 36
  - Density: 0.84/km^{2} (2.2/sq mi)
- Time zone: UTC+1 (CET)
  - Summer (DST): UTC+2 (CEST)
- Postal code: 09592
- Website: http://www.carcedodebureba.es/

Carcedo de Bureba is a municipality located in the province of Burgos, Castile and León, Spain. According to the 2004 census (INE), the municipality had a population of 46 inhabitants.
