= Villanueva de Teba =

Coordinates: 42°39′N 3°10′W

- municipality
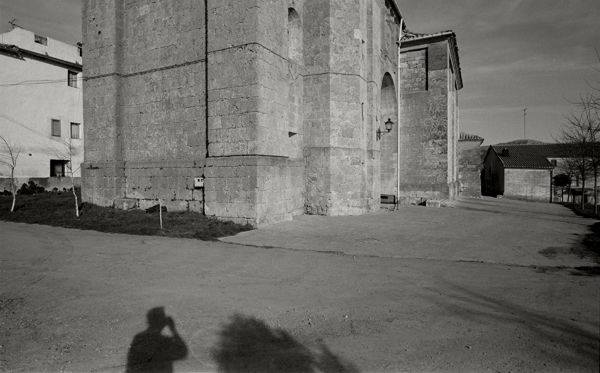

- Flag Coat of arms
- Interactive map of Villanueva de Teba
- Country: Spain
- Autonomous community: Castile and León
- Province: Burgos

Area
  - Total: 5 km^{2} (1.9 sq mi)

Population (2025-01-01)
  - Total: 43
  - Density: 8.6/km^{2} (22/sq mi)
- Time zone: UTC+1 (CET)
  - Summer (DST): UTC+2 (CEST)

Villanueva de Teba is a municipality located in the province of Burgos, Castile and León, Spain. According to the 2004 census (INE), the municipality has a population of 57 inhabitants.

It is named after the Countess of Teba, Eugenia María Fitz-James Stuart y Falcó (1880-1962) and her son Carlos Alfonso de Mitjans, 21st Count of Teba, who had a strong presence in the region.
