= Zuñeda =

Coordinates: 42°36′N 3°13′W

- municipality
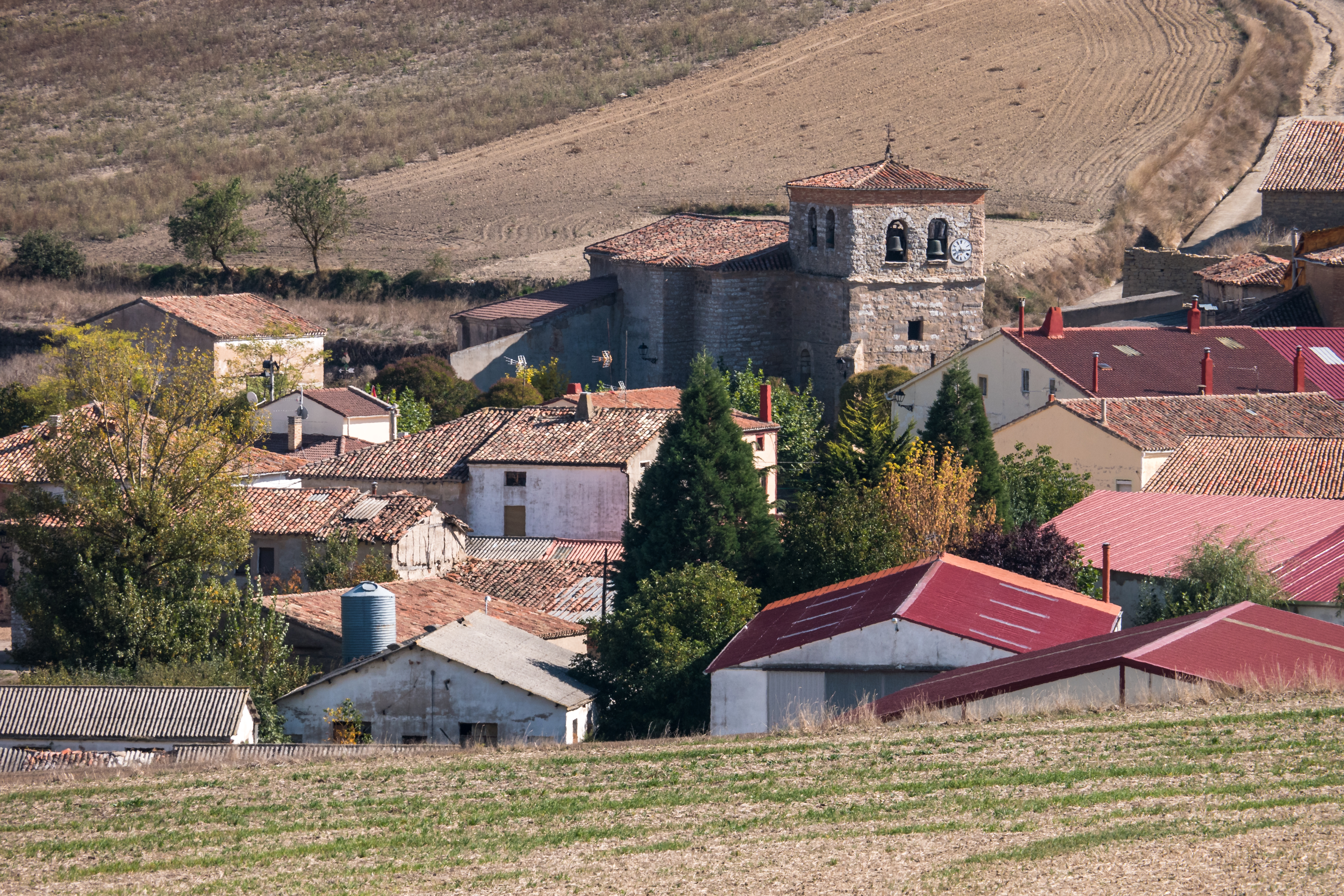
- Houses and church in Zuñeda

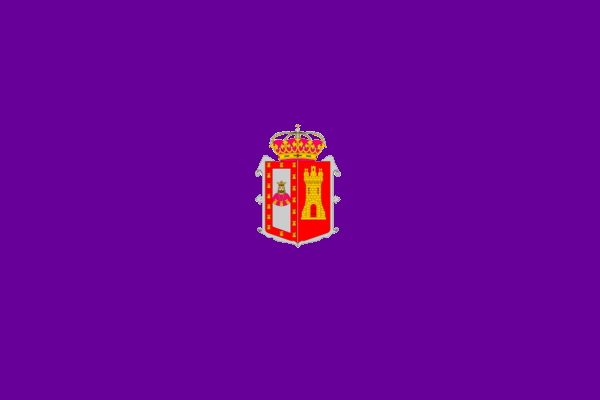
- Flag Coat of arms
- Interactive map of Zuñeda
- Country: Spain
- Autonomous community: Castile and León
- Province: Burgos

Area
  - Total: 12 km^{2} (4.6 sq mi)

Population (2025-01-01)
  - Total: 58
  - Density: 4.8/km^{2} (13/sq mi)
- Time zone: UTC+1 (CET)
  - Summer (DST): UTC+2 (CEST)

Zuñeda is a municipality located in the province of Burgos, Castile and León, Spain. According to the 2021 census (INE), the municipality has a population of 56 inhabitants.
