= Reinoso =

Coordinates: 42°31′N 3°23′W

- Municipality and town
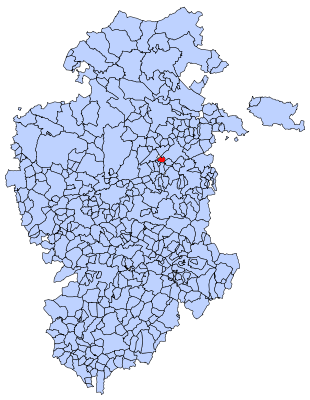
- Municipal location of Reinoso in Burgos province
- Country: Spain
- Autonomous community: Castile and León
- Province: Burgos
- Comarca: La Bureba

Area
  - Total: 8.51 km^{2} (3.29 sq mi)

Population (2025-01-01)
  - Total: 21
  - Density: 2.5/km^{2} (6.4/sq mi)
- Time zone: UTC+1 (CET)
  - Summer (DST): UTC+2 (CEST)
- Postal code: 09248
- Website: http://www.reinoso.es/

Reinoso is a municipality and town located in the province of Burgos, Castile and León, Spain. According to the 2004 census (INE), the municipality has a population of 22 inhabitants.
