= Rucandio =

Coordinates: 42°44′N 02°44′W

- Municipality and town
- Flag Coat of arms

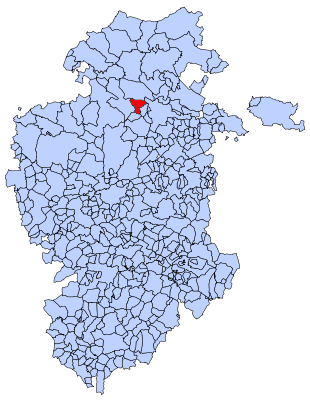
- Municipal location of Rucandio in Burgos province
- Country: Spain
- Autonomous community: Castile and León
- Province: Burgos
- Comarca: La Bureba

Area
  - Total: 32.63 km^{2} (12.60 sq mi)
- Elevation: 802 m (2,631 ft)

Population (2025-01-01)
  - Total: 72
  - Density: 2.2/km^{2} (5.7/sq mi)
- Time zone: UTC+1 (CET)
  - Summer (DST): UTC+2 (CEST)
- Postal code: 09593
- Website: http://www.rucandio.es/

Rucandio is a municipality and town located in the province of Burgos, Castile and León, Spain. According to the 2004 census (INE), the municipality had a population of 85 inhabitants.

== History ==
This territory was established as a municipality when the Ancien Régime overthrew. In that era there were 36 inhabitants.

== Demography ==
These tables below show the population evolution from the year 1860 to the year 2011.

	1860	1877	1887	1897	1900	1910	1920	1930
De facto population	271	253	248	205	223	233	237	427
De jure population		252	250	221	225	246	248	437
Households	69	70	65	59	65	60	53	113

	1940	1950	1960	1970	1981	1991	2001	2011
De facto population	501	451	408	278	157	144		
De jure population	521	485	421	278	157	144		
Households	109	109	102	87	57	66	55	40

== Main sights ==
These are notable sights in the municipality:

- Santo Ángel Shrine
- Natural Site of Caderechas Valley
- De los Infanzones Turret

== Festivities ==
These are the main festivities that are held in the municipality:

- Saint Mary Magdalene Festivity: This festivity is held on 22 July.
- Saint Lawrence Festivity: It is held on 10 August.
- Nuestra Señora de la Piedad Festivity: This festivity is held on 9 September.
- Saint Marina of Aguas Santas Festivity: It is held on 12 September.
- Nuestra Señora de Las Mercedes Festivity: This festivity is consecrated to the Virgin of Mercy. It is held on 24 September.
- San Cosme y San Damián: It is held on 27 September.
