= Castil de Peones =

Coordinates: 42°29′N 3°23′W

- Municipality
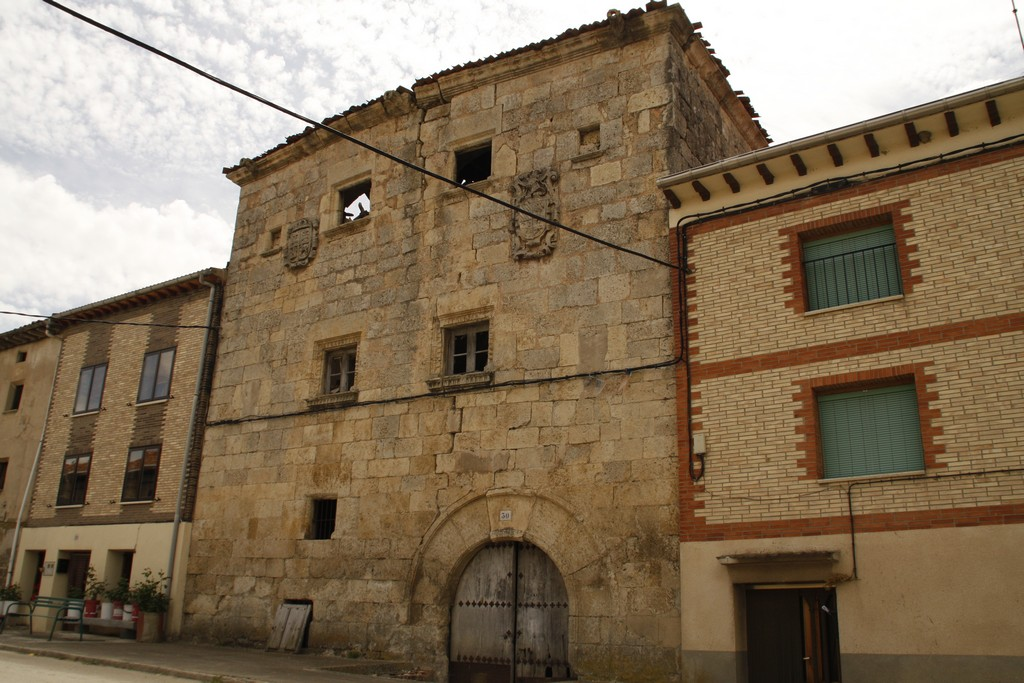
- La Casona tower (16th century)

- Flag Coat of arms

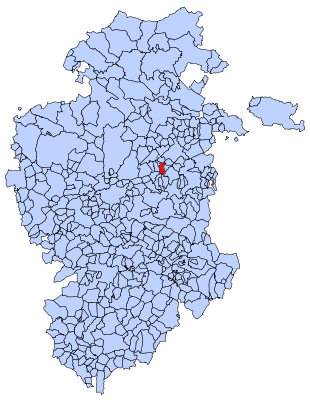
- Municipal location of Castil de Peones in Burgos province
- Country: Spain
- Autonomous community: Castile and León
- Province: Burgos
- Comarca: La Bureba

Area
  - Total: 13.98 km^{2} (5.40 sq mi)
- Elevation: 793 m (2,602 ft)

Population (2025-01-01)
  - Total: 26
  - Density: 1.9/km^{2} (4.8/sq mi)
- Time zone: UTC+1 (CET)
  - Summer (DST): UTC+2 (CEST)
- Postal code: 09258
- Website: http://www.castildepeones.es/

Castil de Peones is a municipality located in the province of Burgos, Castile and León, Spain. According to the 2004 census (INE), the municipality has a population of 28 inhabitants.
