= Vallarta de Bureba =

Coordinates: 42°35′N 3°12′W

- municipality
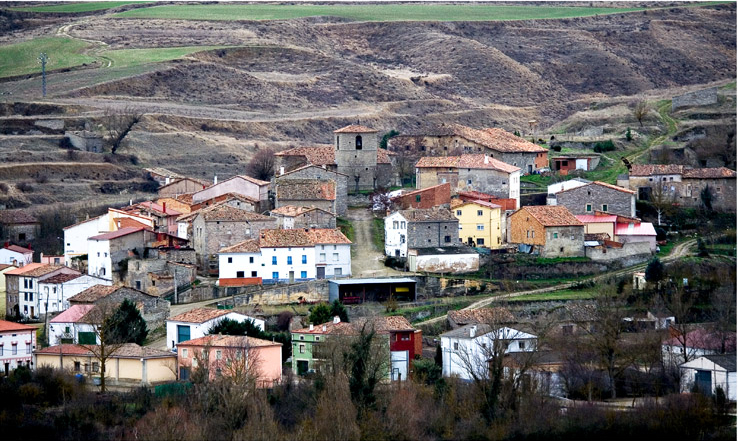
- View of Vallarta de Bureba

- Coat of arms
- Interactive map of Vallarta de Bureba
- Country: Spain
- Autonomous community: Castile and León
- Province: Burgos

Area
  - Total: 19 km^{2} (7.3 sq mi)

Population (2025-01-01)
  - Total: 41
  - Density: 2.2/km^{2} (5.6/sq mi)
- Time zone: UTC+1 (CET)
  - Summer (DST): UTC+2 (CEST)

Vallarta de Bureba is a municipality located in the province of Burgos, Castile and León, Spain. According to the 2004 census (INE), the municipality has a population of 61 inhabitants.
