= Castrojeriz =

- Municipality and town
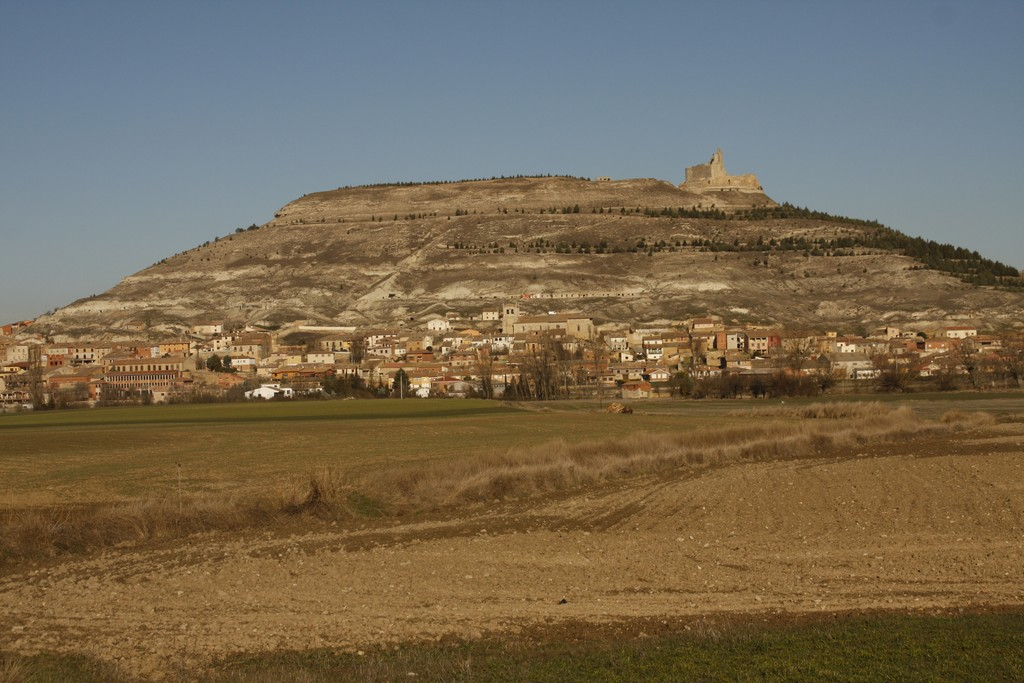
- View of Castrojeriz, 2010

- Coat of arms

- Location in Spain Castrojeriz (Castile and León)
- Coordinates: 42°17′16″N 4°8′20″W
- Autonomous community: Castile and León
- Province: Burgos
- Comarca: Odra-Pisuerga
- Founded: 882

Government
  - Mayor: Beatriz Francés Pérez

Area
  - Total: 136 km^{2} (53 sq mi)
- Elevation: 804 m (2,638 ft)

Population (2025-01-01)
  - Total: 794
  - Density: 5.84/km^{2} (15.1/sq mi)
- Postal code: 09110
- Area code: 947
- Website: Castrojeriz city council

Castrojeriz or Castrogeriz is a locality and municipality located in the province of Burgos, in the autonomous community of Castile and León (Spain), the comarca of Odra-Pisuerga, the judicial district of Burgos, head of the town council of the same name and former head of the Castrojeriz judicial district.

It is a popular stop along the French Way of the Camino de Santiago or The Way of Saint James, which crosses the city longitudinally for more than 1,500 meters.

== History ==
The village is located along the Odra River just before it joins the Pisuerga. Historically it was head of the Castrojeriz judicial district, one of the fourteen that formed the municipality of Burgos, in the period between 1785 and 1833. In the 1787 Floridablanca Census it fell under the jurisdiction of a lordship with its proprietor being the Marquesa de Camarasa, with an ordinary mayor.

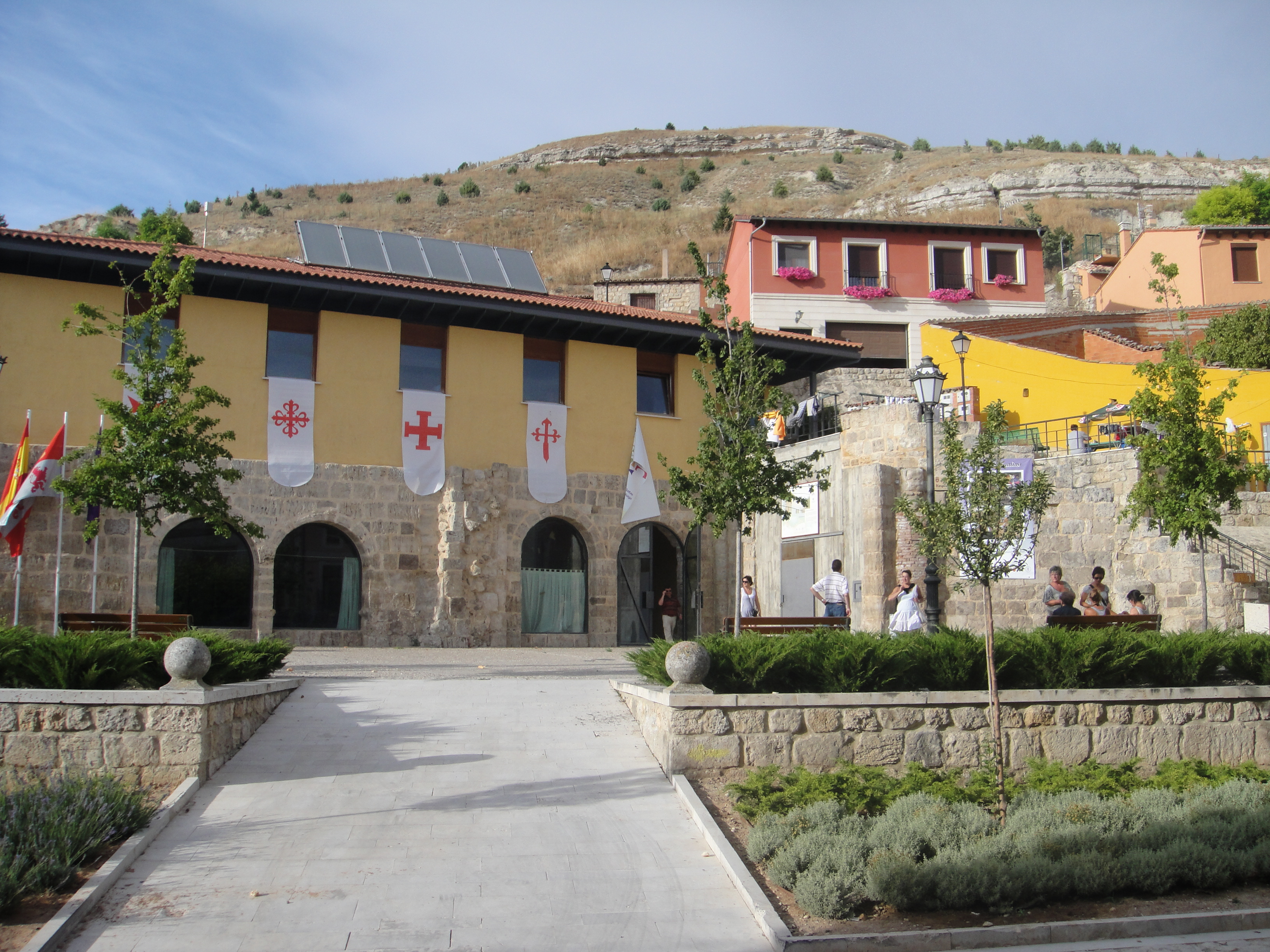
Old San Esteban de Castrojeriz church - a pilgrim boarding place

It is believed to have been the former Castrum Sigerici. The village is arranged like other villages along the Camino. On this street-route there are several churches and notable buildings. There is a castle, in ruins, which has a lot of history. The village was established by Count Muño (or Nuño Nuñez), who defended the fort at the end of the ninth century against the Arabs. Before that it had been a Celtiberian, Roman and Visigoth fortress.

In 974, Count García Fernández of Castile granted it a charter, the Charter of Castrojeriz, which is considered to be the 1st granted in Castile.

Historically, there was a Jewish community in Castrojeriz. In the same year that the town was granted its charter, 974, Count García Fernández ruled that the fine imposed for killing a Jew should not exceed the fine for killing a Christian peasant. The Jewish community in Castrojeriz was one of the earliest recorded in Spain. It ceased to exist after the 1492 expulsion of the Jews.

Castrojeriz is an example of Jacobean urbanism, with houses located around the street-route, which is the longest of all on the pilgrimage route. As an important stage in the Camino de Santiago it had several hospitals along this street.

There is a calvary which sports a Cross of Tau (Tau) instead of the Latin cross perhaps as a reminder of the Order of the Antonians who had a monastery and hospital on the outskirts of the town, where they healed and tended to the sick afflicted by St. Anthony Fire, called also the holy fire, a disease now known to be caused by ingesting a fungal parasite on rye.

== Population ==
As of 1 January 2010 the population of the municipality stood at 882 inhabitants, of which 447 are males and 435 females.

=== Population by nucleus ===
Nucleus	Inhabitants (2000)	Inhabitants (2010)	Notes
Castrojeriz	600	567	
Hinestrosa	74	56	
Tabanera	0	0	Unpopulated
Valbonilla	72	71	
Vallunquera	63	41	
Villasilos	112	103	
Villaveta	75	44	

== Heritage ==
=== The village ===
- Bien de Interés Cultural
- Category: Conjunto histórico (historical group or set)
- Observation: An integral part of the Camino de Santiago delimited by decree 324/99, of the 23 December
- Date — Commencement: 20 December 1974 — Declaration: 20 December 1974 — BOE Declaration: 31 January 1975

=== The Castle of Castrojeriz ===
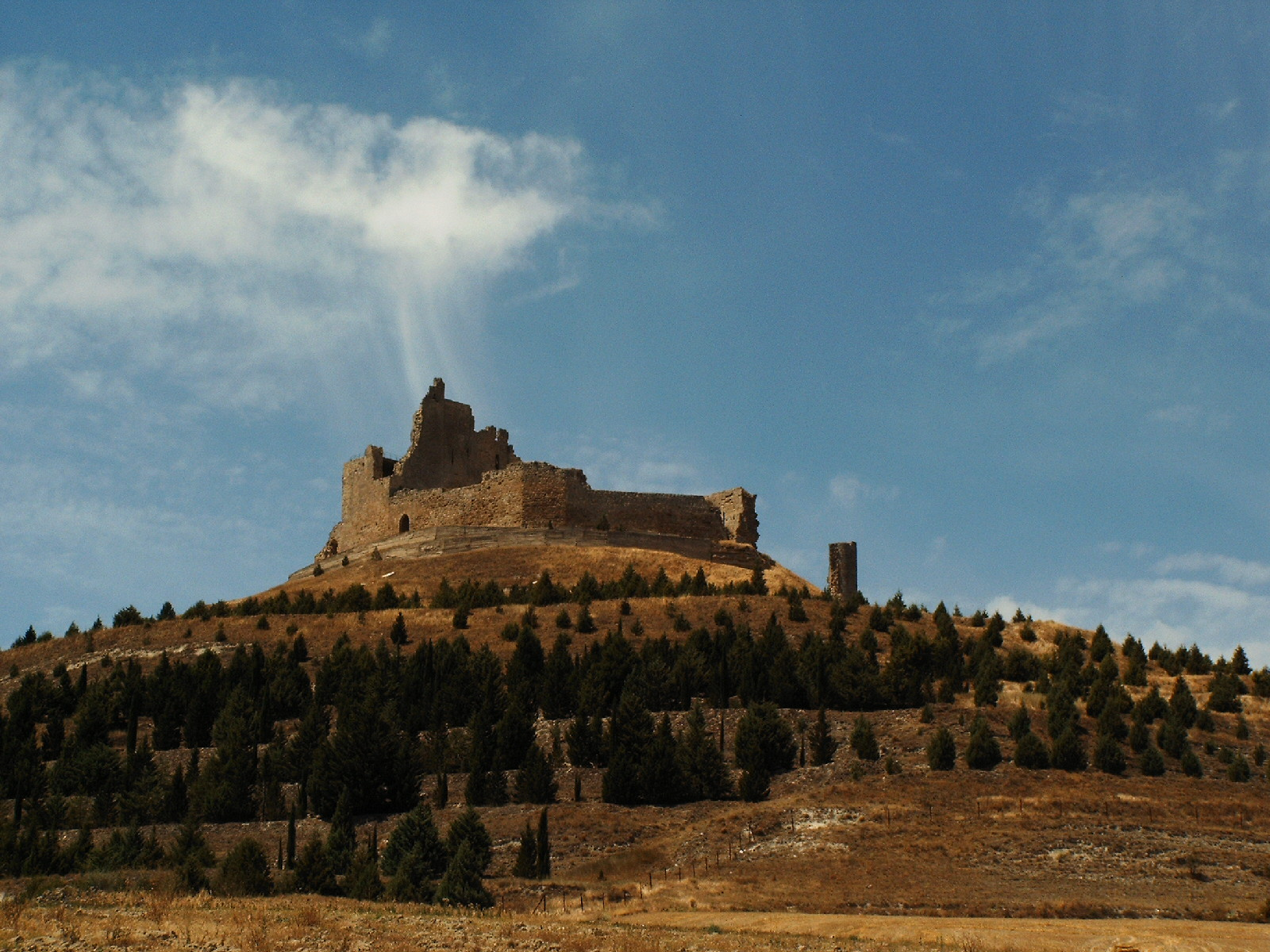
Ruins of the Castle of Castrojeriz.

- Bien de Interés Cultural
- Date — Commencement: 22 April 1949 — Declaration: 22 April 1949 — BOE Declaration: 5 May 1949

In 1359 queen Eleanor of Castile, daughter of king Ferdinand IV of Castile and wife of king Alfonso IV of Aragon, was murdered here by order of her nephew Pedro of Castile.

=== House called "El Fuerte" ===
- Bien de Interés Cultural
- Date — Commencement: 22 April 1949 — Declaration: 22/04/1949 — BOE Declaration: 5 May 1949

=== Tower ===
- Bien de Interés Cultural
- Date — Commencement: 22 April 1949 — Declaration: 22/04/1949 — BOE Declaration: 5 May 1949

=== Church of San Juan ===
- Bien de Interés Cultural
- Date — Commencement: 21 November 1980 — Declaration: 29 June 1990 — BOE Declaration: 3 July 1990

The present building was erected for burial of several families of lineage. It contains the following main elements of interest:

- Sixteenth century cloister - Three galleries or pandas still remain. It has a Mudejar style coffered ceiling with astrological references, decorated with the coats of arms of the Gómez Sandovals, who were lords of Castrojeriz between 1426 and 1476. There are some stamped crossings of Templar origin on the capitals of the columns.
- A funeral chapel built by Juan Gonzalez Gallo, located in the south aisle - It is sixteenth century. The altarpiece is composed of 12 panels attributed to Ambrosius Benson.
- Castro-Mujica Chapel, located in the first section of the north aisle - It was built by Juan and Pedro Henestrosa. There is the Gothic interment of Diego Mújica who died in 1527. It is depicted by a recumbent bust and the sarcophagus adorned with his coats of arms.
- The main altarpiece, built of golden pine in the eighteenth century Rococo style. Its construction was ordered by the Knight Commander and Preceptor General of the Order of San Antonio, Damián García Olloqui, for the San Antón Convent in the town, and transferred to the Church of San Juan when the Order of San Antonio was canonically attached to the Order of Malta in 1777 and finally became defunct in 1791.
- It has a choir loft with railings and stairs with Gothic tracery.

=== Ruins of the San Antón convent ===
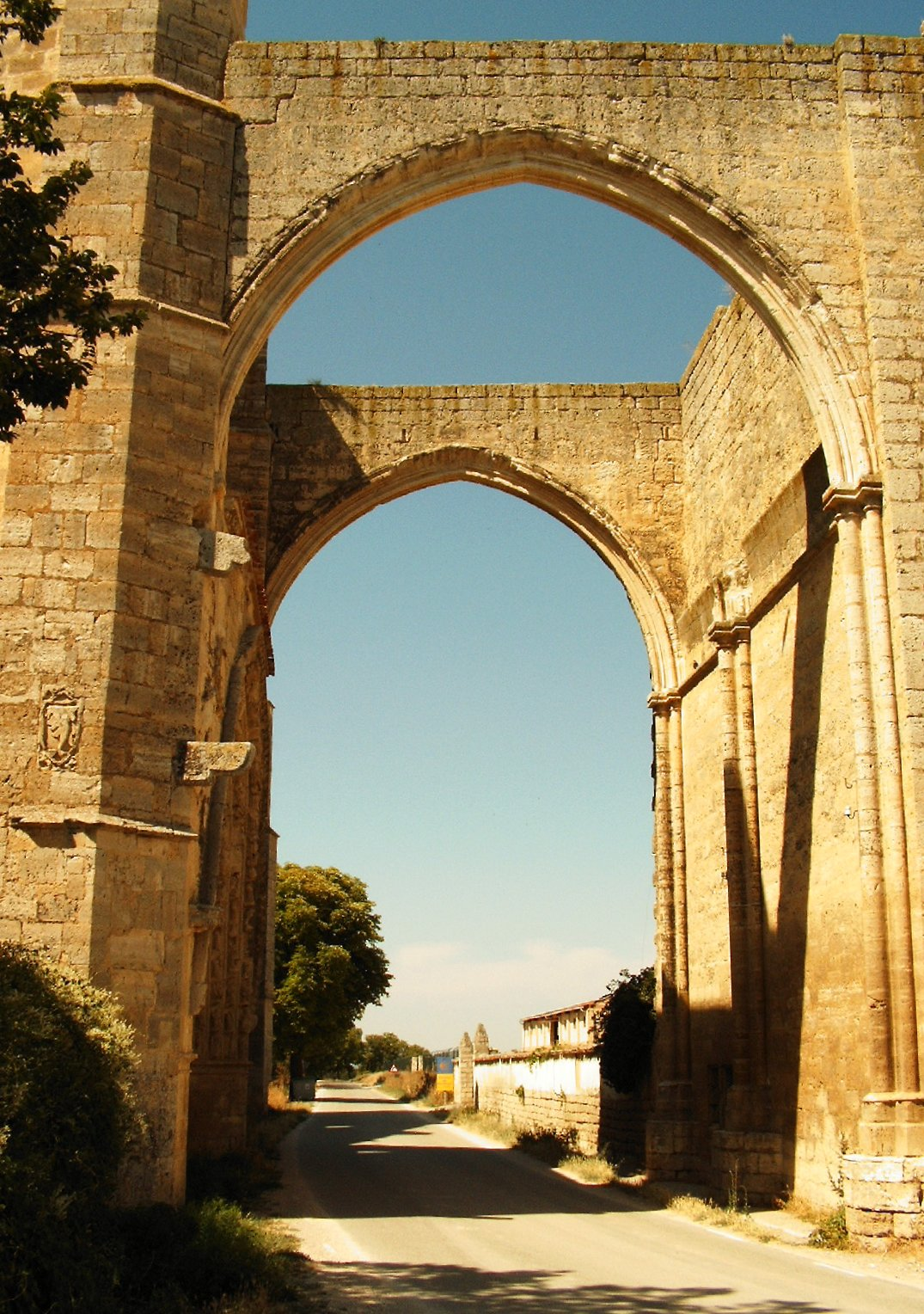
Arch on the ruins of the San Antón convent.

Just outside, Castrojeriz on what was formerly the palace and the garden of King Pedro I of Castile, are the ruins of the ancient monastery of San Antón, run by the Hospital Brothers of St. Anthony, who were dedicated to caring for the sick who came along the Camino de Santiago, especially those with the disease called St. Anthony's fire, sacred fire, fire of sick. Currently only the arch that formed a tunnel, through which pilgrims came and went, is left standing.

This monastery was under royal protection, that is why there are royal crests on the front of the church and on the keys of the vaults. It was founded by Alfonso VII in the twelfth century (1146), and was known as the royal xenodoquio of San Antonio Abad. The present ruins are from the fourteenth century. The hospital was very important, because it was the headquarters of the General Commandery of the Order of San Antonio in the various realms of the Crown of Castile and Portugal, with over twenty dependent encomiendas (house-monastery-hospital). The ceremonies that the Anthonian monks held to bless various objects were famous, to which many adherences came. The symbol of the Order was the tau cross.

== Famous persons ==
- Constance of Castile, Duchess of Lancaster (1354-1394) (Castrojeriz, July 1354 - Leicester castle, 24 March 1394). Second daughter of Peter the Cruel, King of Castille, and of María de Padilla, married to John of Gaunt, Duke of Lancaster and third child of king Edward III of England.
- Laín Calvo (Castrojeriz or Castro Xeriz, 798 -? 870 approximately). Supreme judge of Castille.Wikisource

== See also ==
- Way of St. James

== Bibliography ==
- Abásolo Álvarez; José Antonio (1978). Carta arqueológica de la provincia de Burgos: partidos judiciales de Castrojeriz y Villadiego. Diputación Provincial de Burgos, D.L. ISBN 84-7009-061-5.
- Nadal Subías, Eva & Pérez Grijalbo, Rodrigo (2004). Valores naturales del camino de Santiago a su paso por Castrojeriz. Adeco-Camino, D.L. BU-376.- 2004. ISBN 84-96230-04-X.
