= Iglesias =

Iglesias may refer to:

- Iglesias, Sardinia, a city in a comune in the province of South Sardinia, region of Sardinia, Italy
- Iglesias, Province of Burgos, a municipality in the province of Burgos, in the autonomous community of Castile and León, Spain
- Province of Carbonia-Iglesias an ex province in the region of Sardinia, Italy
- Iglesias (surname)
