= Antonio de la Cuesta y Sáinz =

Spanish writer (1864–1924)

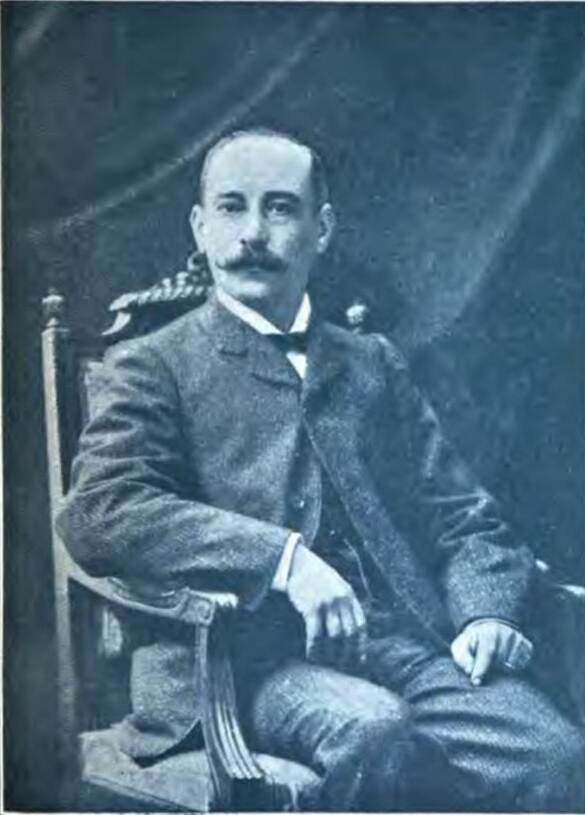
- Portrait on his poetry book Algo de Arriba (1904)
- Born: Antonio María Bernabé de la Cuesta y Sáinz; 1864; Los Balbases, Burgos, Spain
- Died: 1924 (aged 60); Madrid, Spain
- Occupations: Journalist, poet and novelist
- Political party: Integrist Party
- Movement: Carlism
- Spouse: Santa de Urquiza y Amézaga
- Awards: Pro Ecclesia et Pontifice

Antonio de la Cuesta y Sáinz (1864–1924) was a Spanish journalist and poet. A prolific writer, his works range from articles and essays to poems and novellas. While residing at Bilbao he ran the traditionalist newspaper "La Cantabria", and founded and directed religious magazine "El Pan de los Pobres". He was awarded the pro Ecclesia et Pontifice cross by the Pope.

== Biography ==
His parents were Pedro de la Cuesta y Rodríguez, a Carlist army officer, and María Sáinz y Fernández, native from Salamanca. Both of them were banished to Burgos, where they had at least 3 children. His older brother Pedro served as a judge in Cuba, Madrid and Equatorial Guinea, and was lieutenant of the royal army in the Caribbean. His younger brother Julio was also a lieutenant in Cuba and died in Malabo in 1908.

Antonio de la Cuesta was born in 1864 at Los Balbases. He married arabar Santa de Urquiza y Amézaga in Bilbao. The couple had two children, Antonio and María.

Antonio became a traditionalist following his father and started his political activities at the Traditionalist Communion, later adhering to the Integrist secession under Ramón Nocedal in 1888.

Following the papal exhortation, de la Cuesta consecrated his literary activity to the promotion of Catholic morality and philosophy as an author of cuentos, short novels and poems. He directed the traditionalist newspaper "La Cantabria" between 1892 and 1897.

De la Cuesta also sought to promote Catholicism through his magazine "El Pan de los pobres". Founded the 13th April 1886, the publication had the objectives of fostering devotion to Saint Anthony of Padua and contributing to the intellectual formation of Catholics in Spain. His descendants would later cede the magazine's property in 1976 to the Society of Saint Vincent de Paul, which keeps publishing it nowadays.

Antonio de la Cuesta y Sáinz died at Madrid in 1924 due to his cardiorespiratory illness while travelling south on his doctor's order, who prescribed him to avoid Bilbao's cold climate. He was buried with his family at the Cemetery of Begoña.

== Works ==
=== Press ===
He collaborated with the following media (non-exhaustive list):

- El Siglo Futuro
- Los Apuntes: revista semanal independiente
- El Eco de Ciudadela
- La Victoria: semanario de Béjar
- La Defensa: diario de avisos y noticias
- La Vega del Segura: defensor de los intereses morales y materiales de la región.
- La Lid Católica.
- El Grano de Arena: revista católica consagrada al Corazón de Jesús.

=== Novellas ===
- Concha y Loreto. Colecc. Biblioteca Familiar. Lecturas morales y recreativas. Imp. de la Casa de Misericordia (Bilbao, 1899)
- El Alacrán. Colecc. Biblioteca Familiar. Lecturas morales y recreativas. Imp. de la Casa de Misericordia (Bilbao, 1899)

=== Poetry ===
- Rosas y Espinas. Colección de Poesías.(Valladolid, 1899)
- A la Virtud: Oda Imp. de la Casa de Misericordia (Bilbao, 1899)
- Algo de Arriba: Poesías... Imp. de la Casa de Misericordia (Bilbao, 1904)

=== Religious literature ===
- La Adoración Nocturna. Imp. Florentino de Elosu (Durango, 1905)
- La mujer rehabilitada por María : Sintético estudio histórico-crítico.... Imp. Florentino de Elosu (Durango, 1906)

=== Plays ===
- Hasta la honra se compra. Drama en verso (en tres actos). (Valladolid, 1860)

== Honorific distinctions ==
- Holy Cross of the Order Pro Ecclesia et Pontifice (Holy See).

== Bibliography ==
- Marqués de Arriluce de Ybarra (1968). La casa Urrutia de Avellaneda y familias enlazadas españolas y americanas. Bilbao.
- Enciclopedia Espasa. Enciclopedia universal ilustrada europeo-americana. Barcelona: Editorial Espasa-Calpe.
