= Odra-Pisuerga =

Coordinates: 42°20′09″N 4°05′33″W

- Comarca
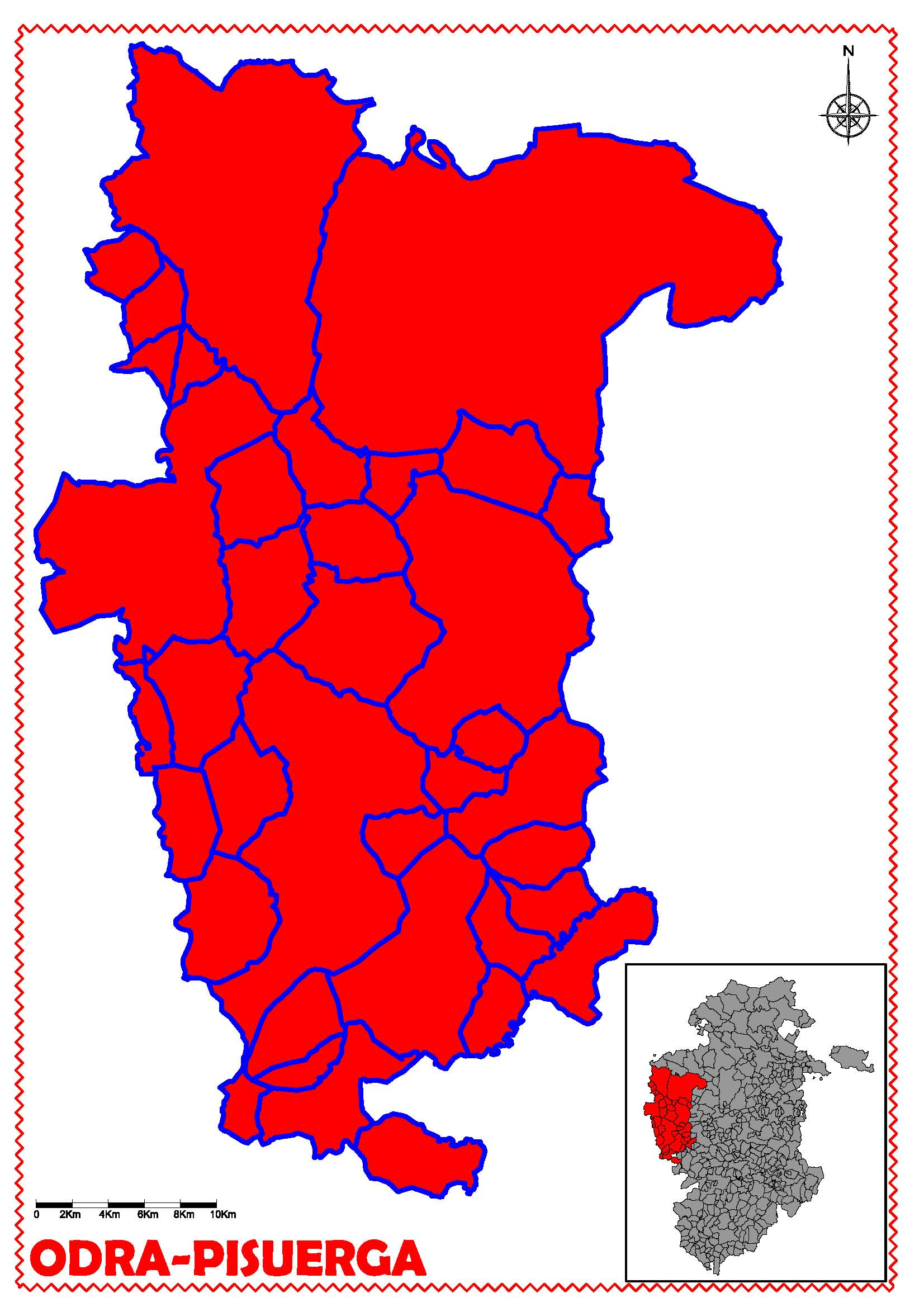
- Country: Spain
- Autonomous community: Castile and León
- Province: Burgos
- Capital: Villadiego
- Time zone: UTC+1 (CET)
  - Summer (DST): UTC+2 (CEST)
- Largest municipality: Melgar de Fernamental

Odra-Pisuerga is a comarca (county, but without administrative roles) located in the west of the province of Burgos, in the autonomous community of Castile and León, Spain. It is bounded by the west and south-west by the province of Palencia, south-east by the Arlanza comarca, west by the Alfoz de Burgos and north by the Páramos comarca.

== Municipalities ==
- Arenillas de Riopisuerga
- Balbases, Los
- Barrio de Muñó
- Belbimbre
- Castellanos de Castro
- Castrillo de Riopisuerga
- Castrillo Mota de Judíos
- Castrojeriz
- Grijalba
- Hontanas
- Iglesias
- Itero del Castillo
- Manciles
- Melgar de Fernamental
- Padilla de Abajo
- Padilla de Arriba
- Palacios de Riopisuerga
- Palazuelos de Muñó
- Pampliega
- Pedrosa del Páramo
- Pedrosa del Príncipe
- Rebolledo de la Torre
- Revilla Vallejera
- Rezmondo
- Sasamón
- Sordillos
- Sotresgudo
- Susinos del Páramo
- Tamarón
- Tobar
- Vallejera
- Valles de Palenzuela
- Villadiego
- Villaldemiro
- Villamayor de Treviño

== Geography ==
The comarca is bounded in the west by the Pisuerga river, and in the east by its affluent, the Odra and Pisuerga river, giving name to the region.

== See also ==
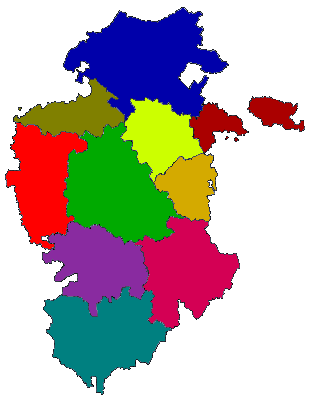
Comarcas of the province of Burgos.: Páramos Alfoz de Burgos Odra y Pisuerga Arlanza Ribera del Duero / Merindades Ebro La Bureba Montes de Oca Sierra de la Demanda

- Province of Burgos
