= Villaute =

Village in Burgos, Spain

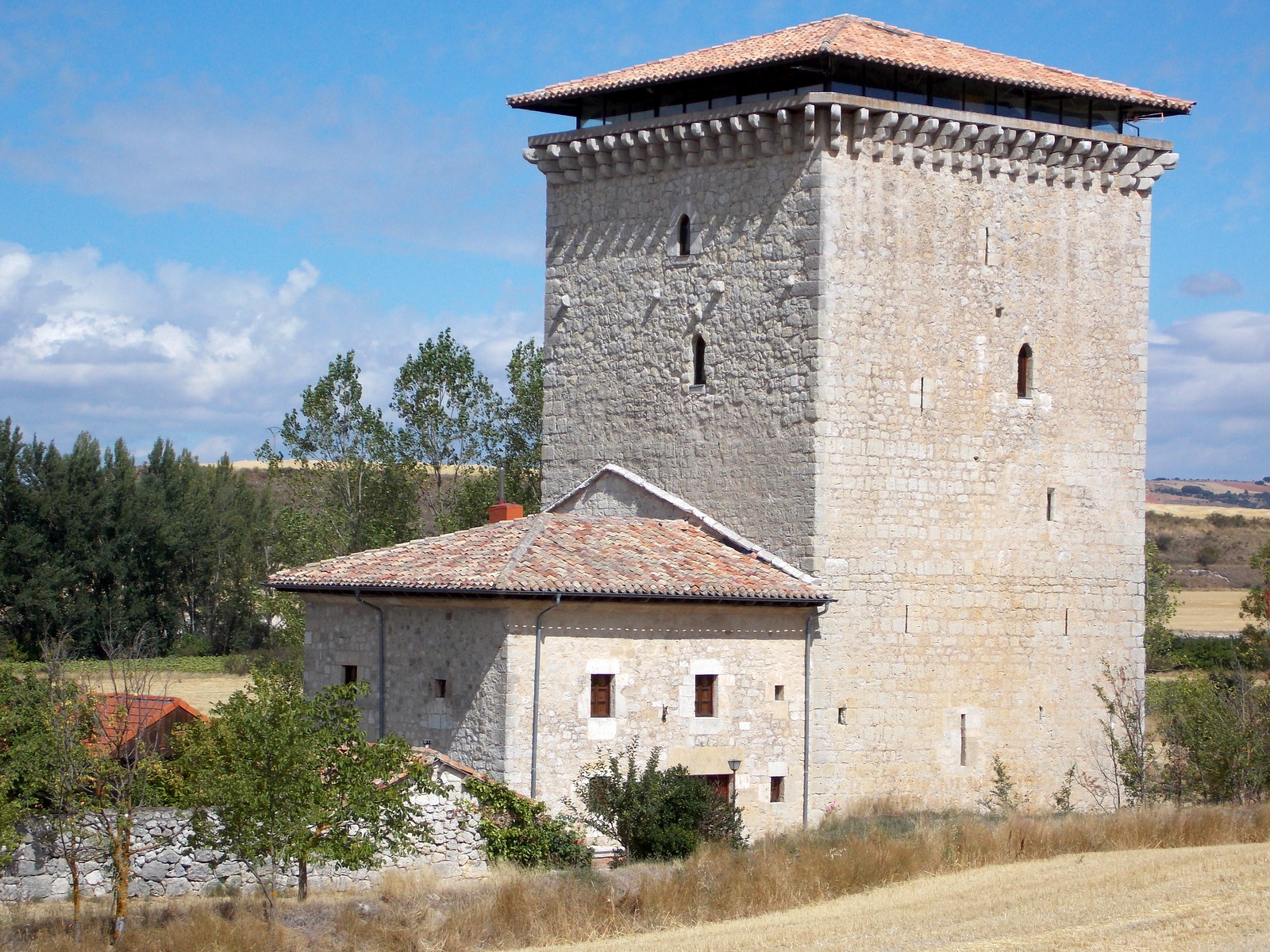
- Torreón de Villaute

- Location in Spain
- Coordinates: 42°32′37.8″N 3°57′34.8″W
- Country: Spain
- Autonomous community: Castile and León
- Province: Burgos
- Municipality: Villadiego
- Founded: 1208

Government
  - Mayor: Alfonso Fernando López Martínez (Partido Popular)
- Elevation: 870 m (2,850 ft)

Population (2013)
  - Total: 13
- Time zone: UTC + 1
- Postal code: 09125
- Area code: 947
- Distances: 122 km (76 mi) to Valladolid; 159 km (99 mi) to Bilbao; 244 km (152 mi) to Madrid; 618 km (384 mi) to Barcelona
- Rivers: Brullés
- Demonym: Burgalés/Burgalesa

Villaute is a small village located in the western part of the province of Burgos, Spain. It is approximately 45 km from the provincial capital of Burgos and 5 km from the town of Villadiego.

The main sites in the village include the 12th-century Church of St. Martin, one of the few churches in the world with two apses, and the 15th-century defensive tower (castillo), which was declared a national monument on April 22, 1949.
