= Santa Maria in Betlem =

Church in Pavia, Italy

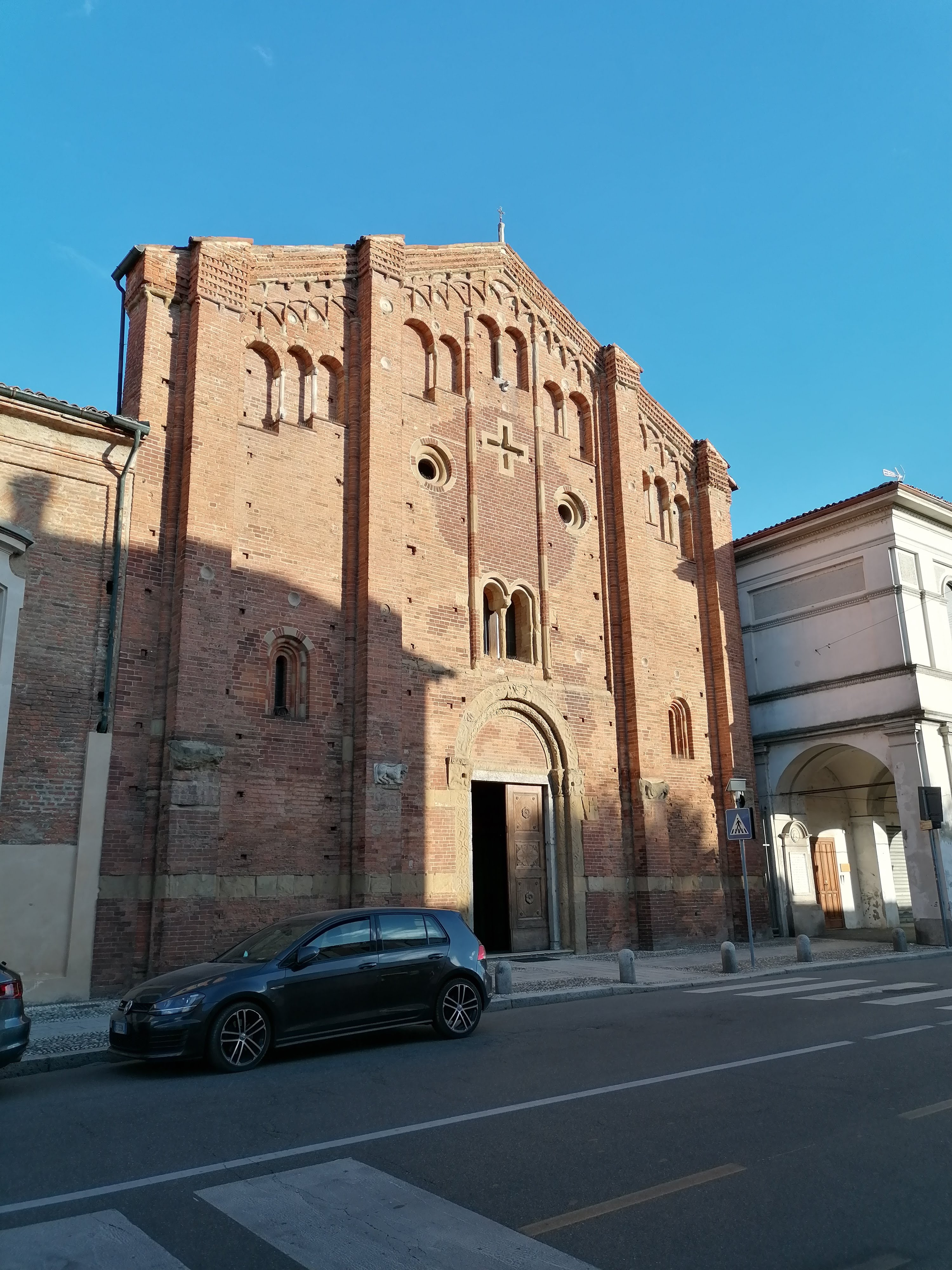

Religion
- Affiliation: Catholic
- Province: Pavia
- Year consecrated: ninth century
- Status: Active

Location
- Location: Pavia, Italy
- Interactive map of Santa Maria in Betlem
- Coordinates: 45°10′38.63″N 9°9′02.04″E

Architecture
- Type: Church
- Style: Romanesque
- Completed: 1130

The church of Santa Maria in Betlem, founded around 1130, stands in the characteristic district of the Borgo of Pavia, located, after the Ponte Coperto, on the other bank of the Ticino river from the city center.

== History ==
The name of the church, Santa Maria in Betlem, derives from the fact that the road axis of Borgo Ticino was the director for pilgrims going to the Holy Land, and for the dependence (opposed by the bishop of Pavia) of the church on the bishop of Bethlehem. The current church, dating from the late twelfth century, stands on the area of a previous building from the Carolingian period. In 1952, during the restoration of the church, the remains of the Carolingian building were identified and the perimeter of the Carolingian church was traced on the floor of the church (which can be accessed through a trap door).

Near the church stood the Oltreticino Hospital, which housed pilgrims, the sick and the poor. The first documents mentioning the church and the hospital date back to 1130. In 1383 the hospital was merged with the nearby hospital of Saint Anthony the Great. The hospital was closed in 1808 and its portico, dating back to the 17th century, remains next to the church. The hospital was run by the Anthonians friars of Vienne in France. The interior of the church underwent profound changes between 1735 and 1739, to adapt the Romanesque church to the Baroque style. The 1952 restorations have almost eliminated the baroque layer, restoring the interior of the church to its original appearance.

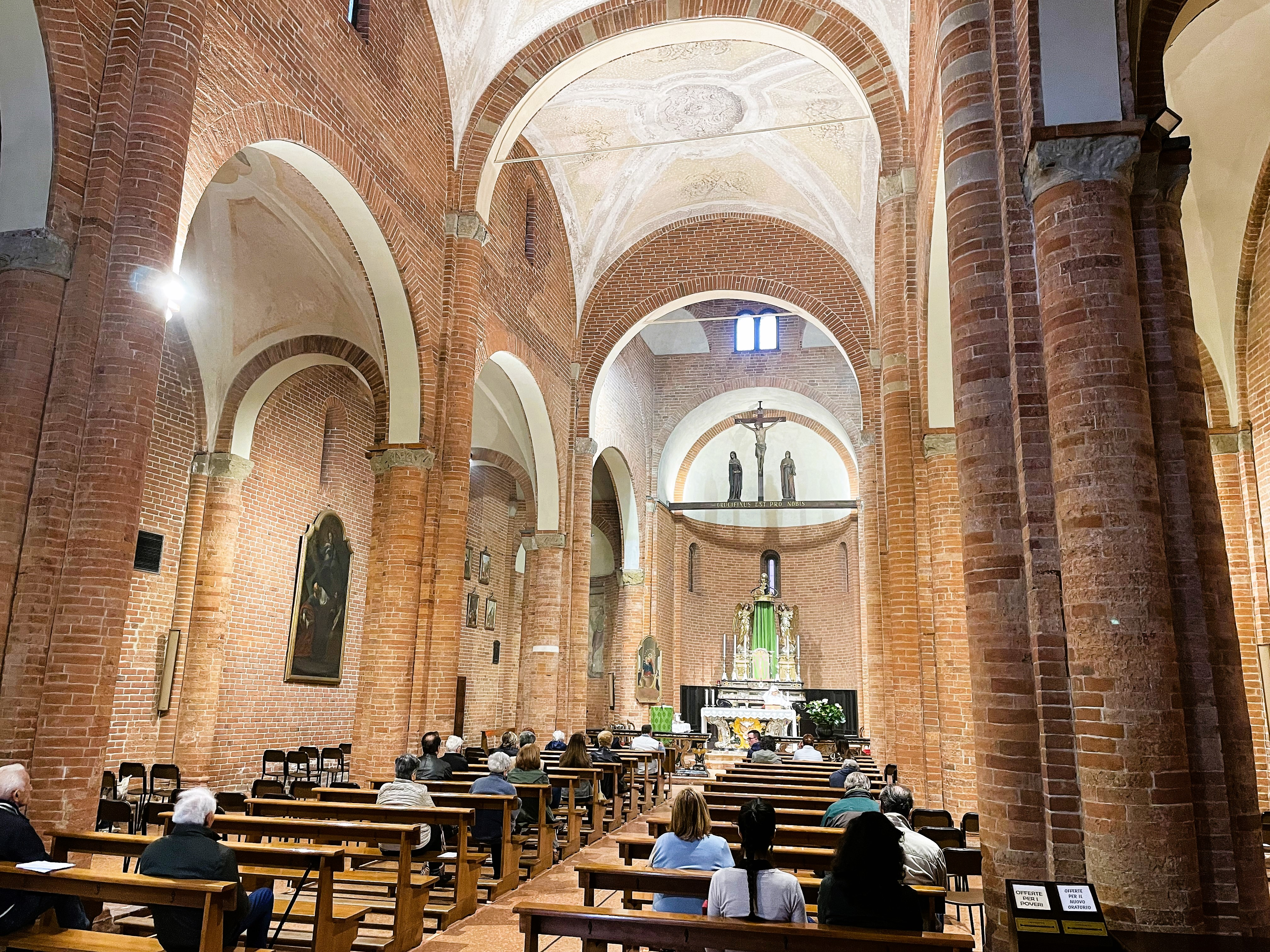
Interior.

== Architecture ==
Santa Maria in Betlem has, like many other Romanesque churches in Pavia, a large sandstone portal with a slight splay. The façade is completed by blind loggias. On the façade there are still some Arab and Byzantine dishes dating back to the 12th century. Internally, the church is marked by three naves. At the end of the central nave is the dome. Inside the first chapel on the left, inside a large 18th century marble altar, is the miraculous painted wooden statue of the Madonna della Stella, probably a 13th-century French work. The frescoes on the vault were painted by Paolo Barbotti in 1851. The bell tower, dating back to the 13th century, was raised in the modern age.

== Bibliography ==
- Anna Segagni Malacart, L'architettura romanica pavese, in Storia di Pavia, III/3, L’arte dall’XI al XVI secolo, Milano, Banca Regionale Europea, 1996, pp. 115– 227
