= Belbimbre =

Coordinates: 42°10′N 4°00′W

- Municipality and town
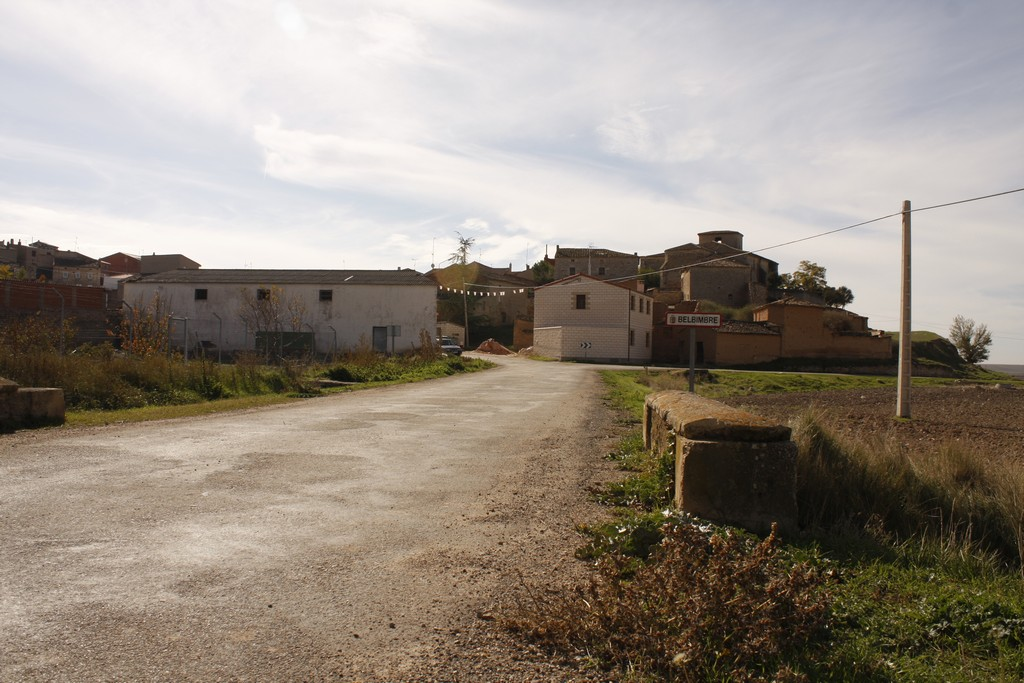
- View of Belbimbre, 2009

- Flag Coat of arms
- Interactive map of Belbimbre
- Country: Spain
- Autonomous community: Castile and León
- Province: Burgos
- Comarca: Odra-Pisuerga

Area
  - Total: 10 km^{2} (3.9 sq mi)
- Elevation: 796 m (2,612 ft)

Population (2025-01-01)
  - Total: 53
  - Density: 5.3/km^{2} (14/sq mi)
- Time zone: UTC+1 (CET)
  - Summer (DST): UTC+2 (CEST)
- Postal code: 09226
- Website: http://www.belbimbre.es/

Belbimbre is a municipality and town located in the province of Burgos, Castile and León, Spain. According to the 2004 census (INE), the municipality has a population of 80 inhabitants.
