= Revilla Vallejera =

Coordinates: 42.233°N 4.217°W

- Municipality and town
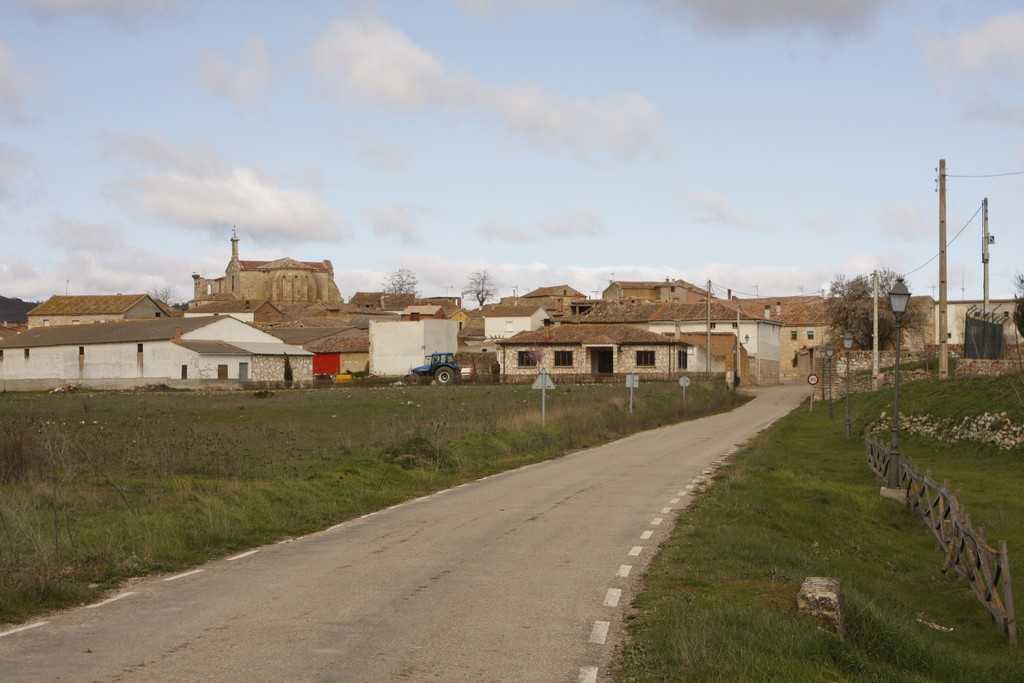
- View of Revilla Vallejera, 2010

- Flag Coat of arms
- Interactive map of Revilla Vallejera
- Country: Spain
- Autonomous community: Castile and León
- Province: Burgos
- Comarca: Odra-Pisuerga

Area
  - Total: 27.46 km^{2} (10.60 sq mi)
- Elevation: 787 m (2,582 ft)

Population (2025-01-01)
  - Total: 112
  - Density: 4.08/km^{2} (10.6/sq mi)
- Time zone: UTC+1 (CET)
  - Summer (DST): UTC+2 (CEST)
- Postal code: 09260
- Website: http://revillavallejera.burgos.es/

Revilla Vallejera is a municipality and town located in the province of Burgos, Castile and León, Spain. According to the 2004 census (INE), the municipality has a population of 119 inhabitants.
