= Castellanos de Castro =

Coordinates: 42°20′N 4°02′W

- Municipality
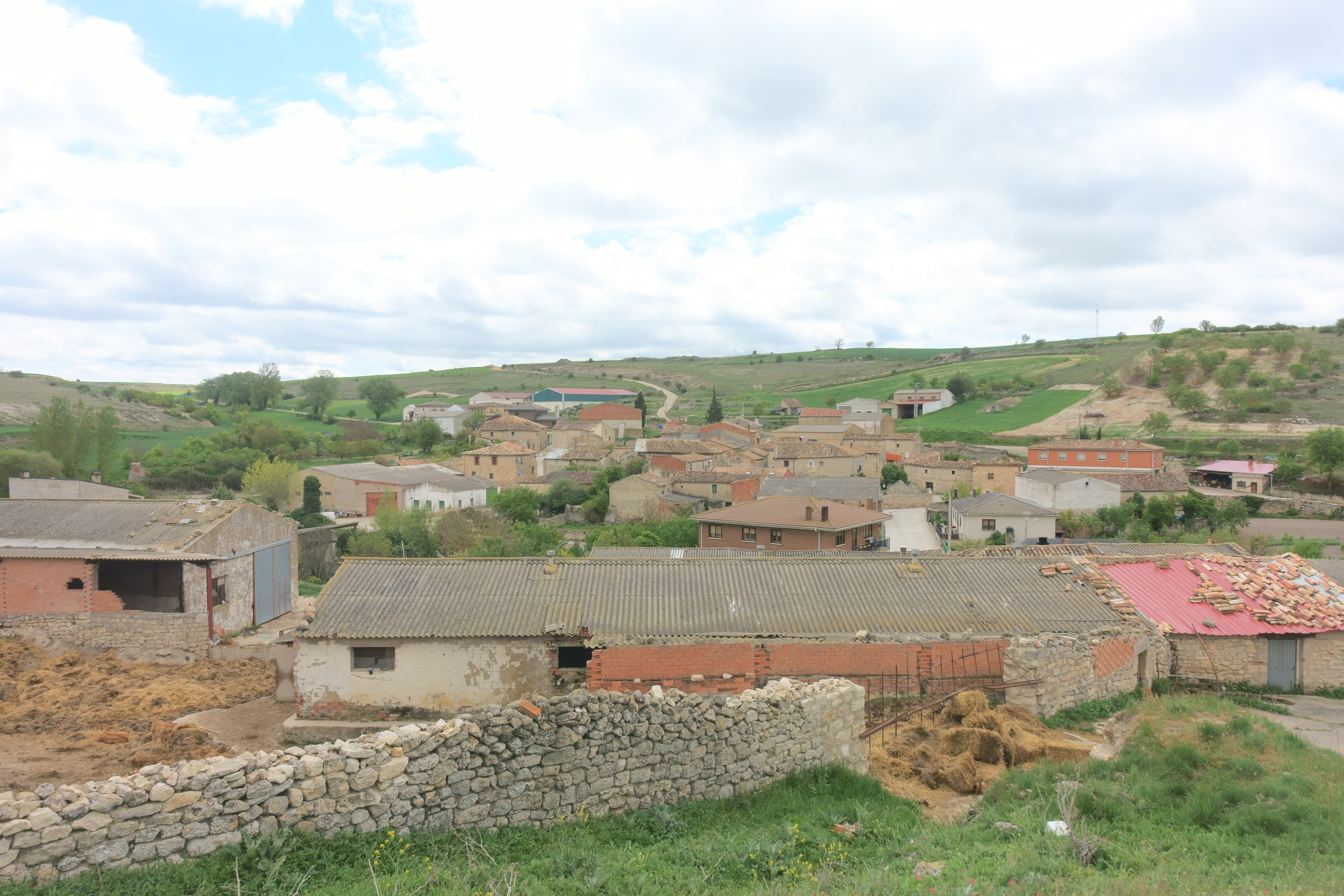
- View of Castellanos de Castro

- Flag Coat of arms
- Interactive map of Castellanos de Castro
- Country: Spain
- Autonomous community: Castile and León
- Province: Burgos
- Comarca: Odra-Pisuerga

Area
  - Total: 10 km^{2} (3.9 sq mi)
- Elevation: 881 m (2,890 ft)

Population (2025-01-01)
  - Total: 48
  - Density: 4.8/km^{2} (12/sq mi)
- Time zone: UTC+1 (CET)
  - Summer (DST): UTC+2 (CEST)
- Website: http://www.castellanosdecastro.es/

Castellanos de Castro (formerly known also as Castellanos del Infante) is a municipality located in the province of Burgos, Castile and León, Spain. According to the 2004 census (INE), the municipality has a population of 63 inhabitants.
