= Manciles =

Coordinates: 42°27′N 3°57′W

- Municipality and town
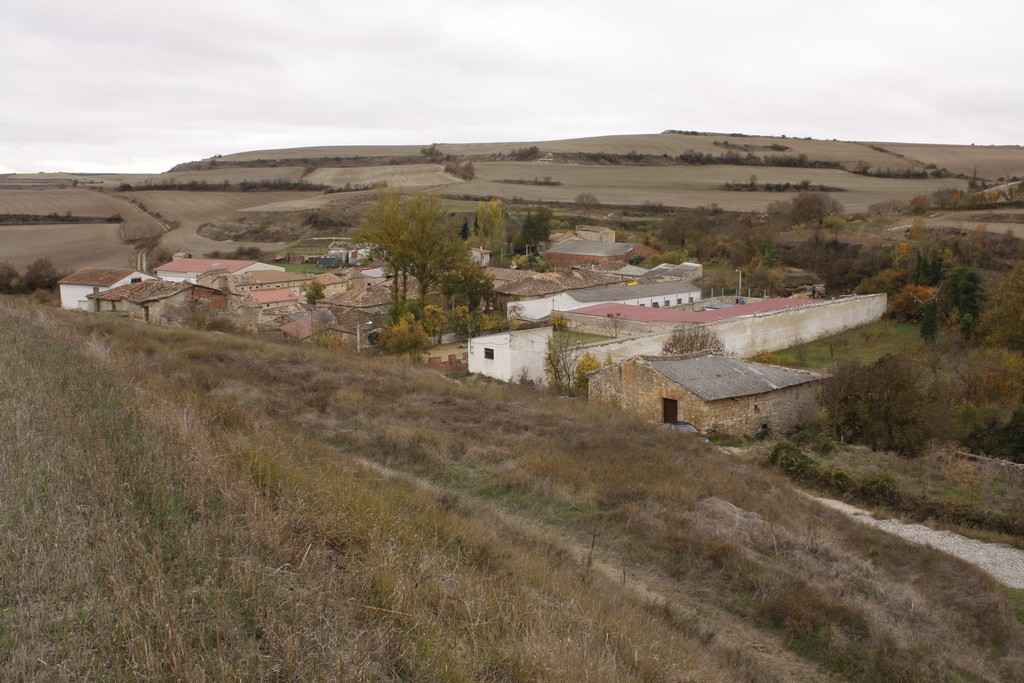
- View of Manciles, 2009
- Interactive map of Manciles
- Country: Spain
- Autonomous community: Castile and León
- Province: Burgos
- Comarca: Odra-Pisuerga

Area
  - Total: 6 km^{2} (2.3 sq mi)
- Elevation: 885 m (2,904 ft)

Population (2025-01-01)
  - Total: 21
  - Density: 3.5/km^{2} (9.1/sq mi)
- Time zone: UTC+1 (CET)
  - Summer (DST): UTC+2 (CEST)
- Postal code: 09133
- Website: https://www.manciles.es/

Manciles is a municipality and town located in the province of Burgos, Castile and León, Spain. According to the 2012 census (INE), the municipality has a population of 25 inhabitants.
