= Padilla de Arriba =

Coordinates: 42°26′N 4°11′W

- Municipality and town
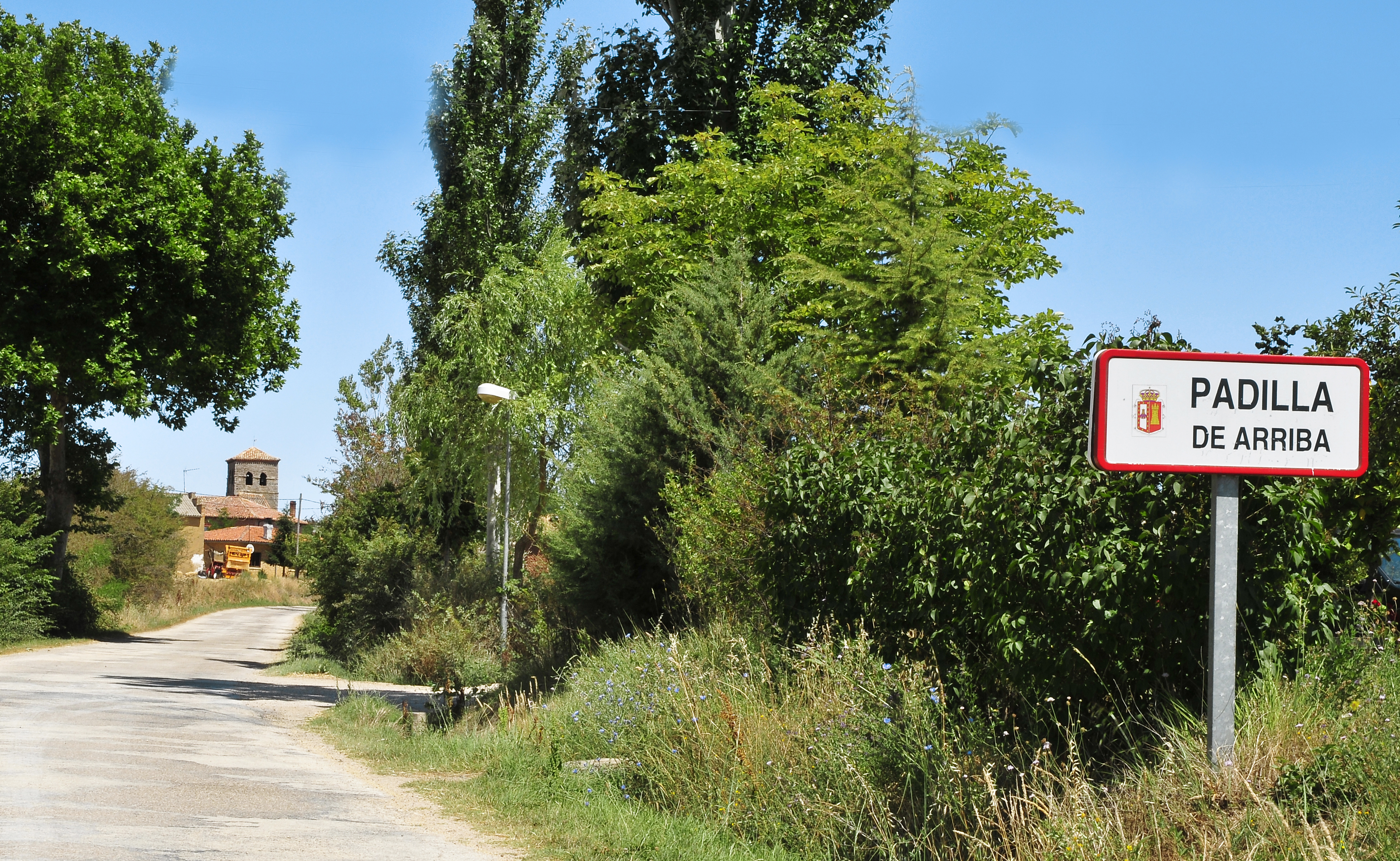
- Entrance of Padilla de Arriba Village

- Coat of arms
- Interactive map of Padilla de Arriba
- Country: Spain
- Autonomous community: Castile and León
- Province: Burgos
- Comarca: Odra-Pisuerga

Area
  - Total: 23 km^{2} (8.9 sq mi)
- Elevation: 824 m (2,703 ft)

Population (2025-01-01)
  - Total: 86
  - Density: 3.7/km^{2} (9.7/sq mi)
- Time zone: UTC+1 (CET)
  - Summer (DST): UTC+2 (CEST)
- Postal code: 09108
- Website: http://www.padilladearriba.es/

Padilla de Arriba is a municipality and town located in the province of Burgos, Castile and León, Spain. According to the 2022 census (INE), the municipality has a population of 84 inhabitants.
