= Barrio de Muñó =

Coordinates: 42°11′N 4°00′W

- Municipality and town
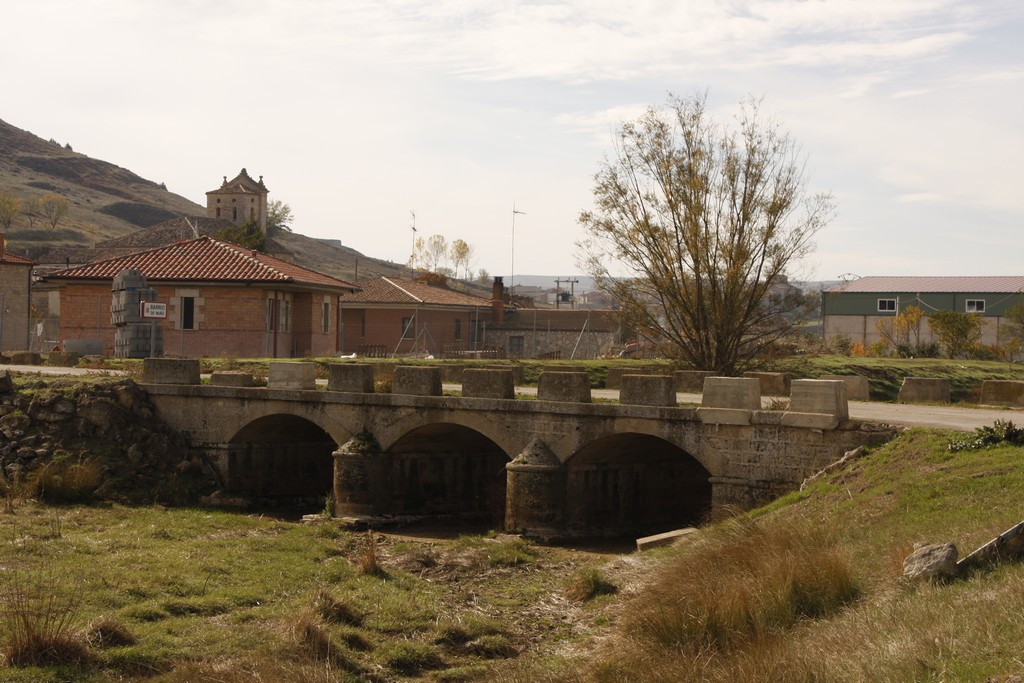
- View of Barrio de Muñó, 2009
- Interactive map of Barrio de Muñó
- Country: Spain
- Autonomous community: Castile and León
- Province: Burgos
- Comarca: Odra-Pisuerga

Area
  - Total: 4 km^{2} (1.5 sq mi)
- Elevation: 718 m (2,356 ft)

Population (2025-01-01)
  - Total: 32
  - Density: 8.0/km^{2} (21/sq mi)
- Time zone: UTC+1 (CET)
  - Summer (DST): UTC+2 (CEST)
- Postal code: 09226

Barrio de Muñó is a municipality and town located in the province of Burgos, Castile and León, Spain. According to the 2004 census (INE), the municipality has a population of 32 inhabitants.
