= Padilla de Abajo =

Coordinates: 42°24′N 4°10′W

- Municipality and town
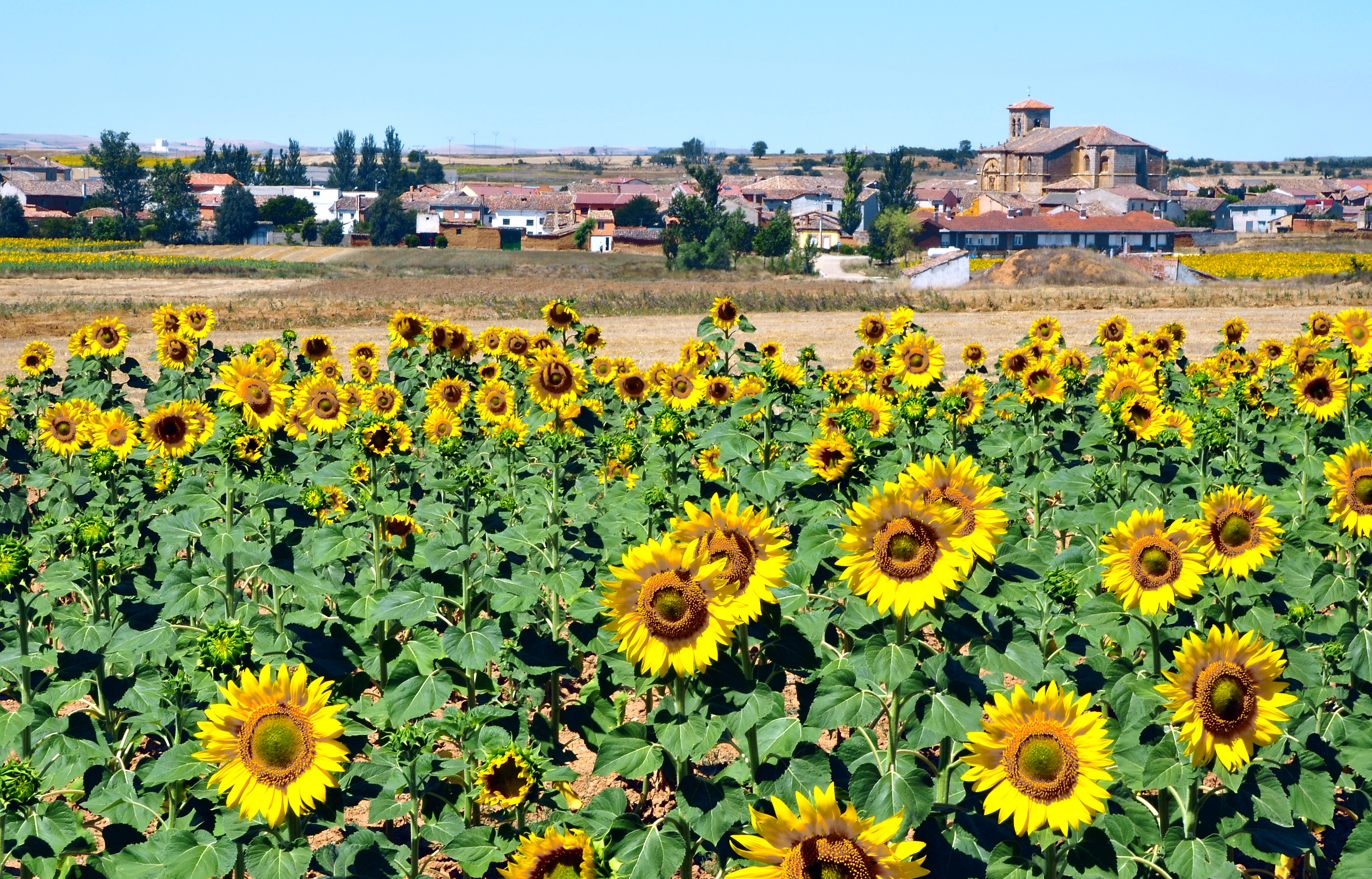
- View of Padilla de Abajo

- Flag Coat of arms
- Interactive map of Padilla de Abajo
- Country: Spain
- Autonomous community: Castile and León
- Province: Burgos
- Comarca: Odra-Pisuerga

Government
  - Mayor: Mª Pilar Gómez Bahillo (PP)

Area
  - Total: 27.76 km^{2} (10.72 sq mi)
- Elevation: 800 m (2,600 ft)

Population (2025-01-01)
  - Total: 71
  - Density: 2.6/km^{2} (6.6/sq mi)
- Time zone: UTC+1 (CET)
  - Summer (DST): UTC+2 (CEST)
- Postal code: 09109
- Website: http://www.padilladeabajo.es/

Padilla de Abajo is a small village and municipality located in the province of Burgos, in the kingdom of Spain. It has a Romanesque chapel that hosts a figure of the Virgin Mary called Nuestra Señora del Torreon. Many of its inhabitants still have "Padilla" as their family name.
