= Arenillas de Riopisuerga =

- Municipality and town
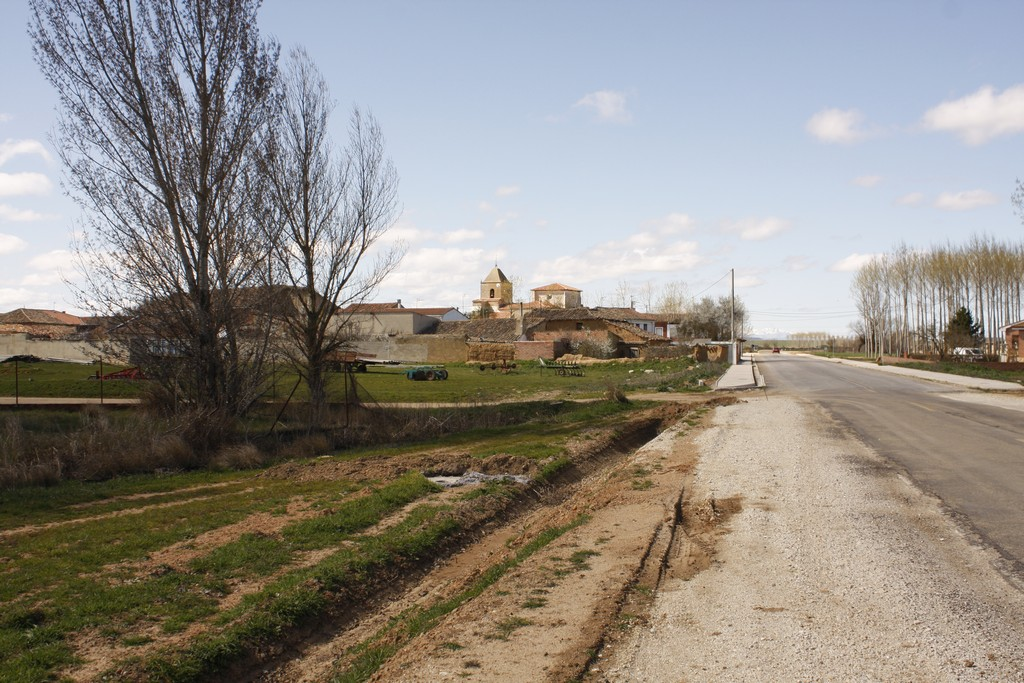
- View of Arenillas de Riopisuerga, 2010

- Location within Castile and León Location within Spain
- Coordinates: 42°21′N 4°14′W
- Country: Spain
- Autonomous community: Castile and León
- Province: Burgos
- Comarca: Odra-Pisuerga

Area
  - Total: 27.99 km^{2} (10.81 sq mi)
- Elevation: 791 m (2,595 ft)

Population (2004)
  - Total: 221
  - Density: 7.90/km^{2} (20.4/sq mi)
- Time zone: UTC+1 (CET)
  - Summer (DST): UTC+2 (CEST)
- Postal code: 09107
- Website: http://www.arenillasderiopisuerga.es/

Arenillas de Riopisuerga is a municipality and town located in the province of Burgos, Castile and León, Spain. According to the 2004 census (INE), the municipality had a population of 221 inhabitants.
