= Hontanas =

Coordinates: 42°19′N 4°02′W

- Municipality
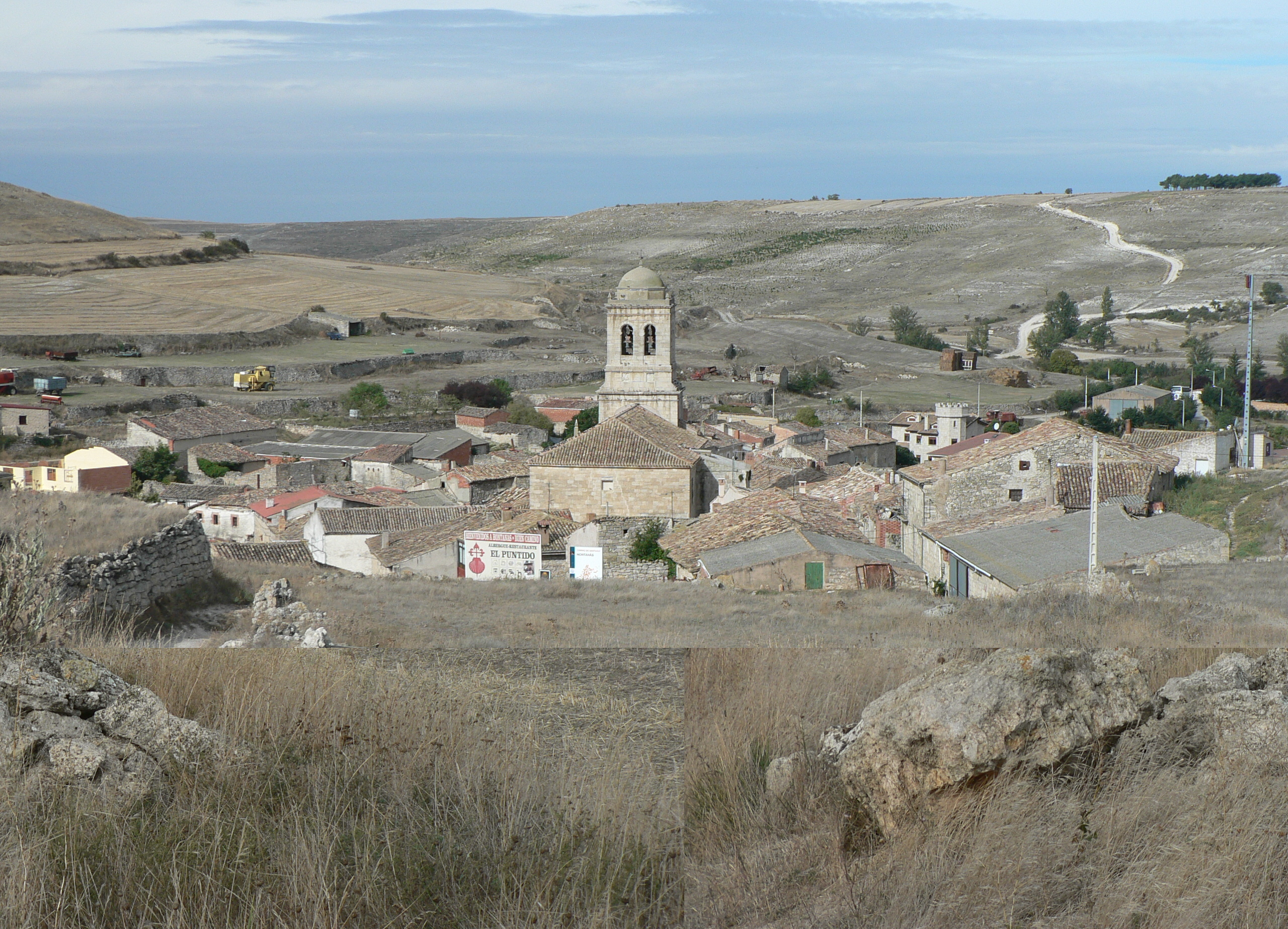
- View of Hontanas, 2006

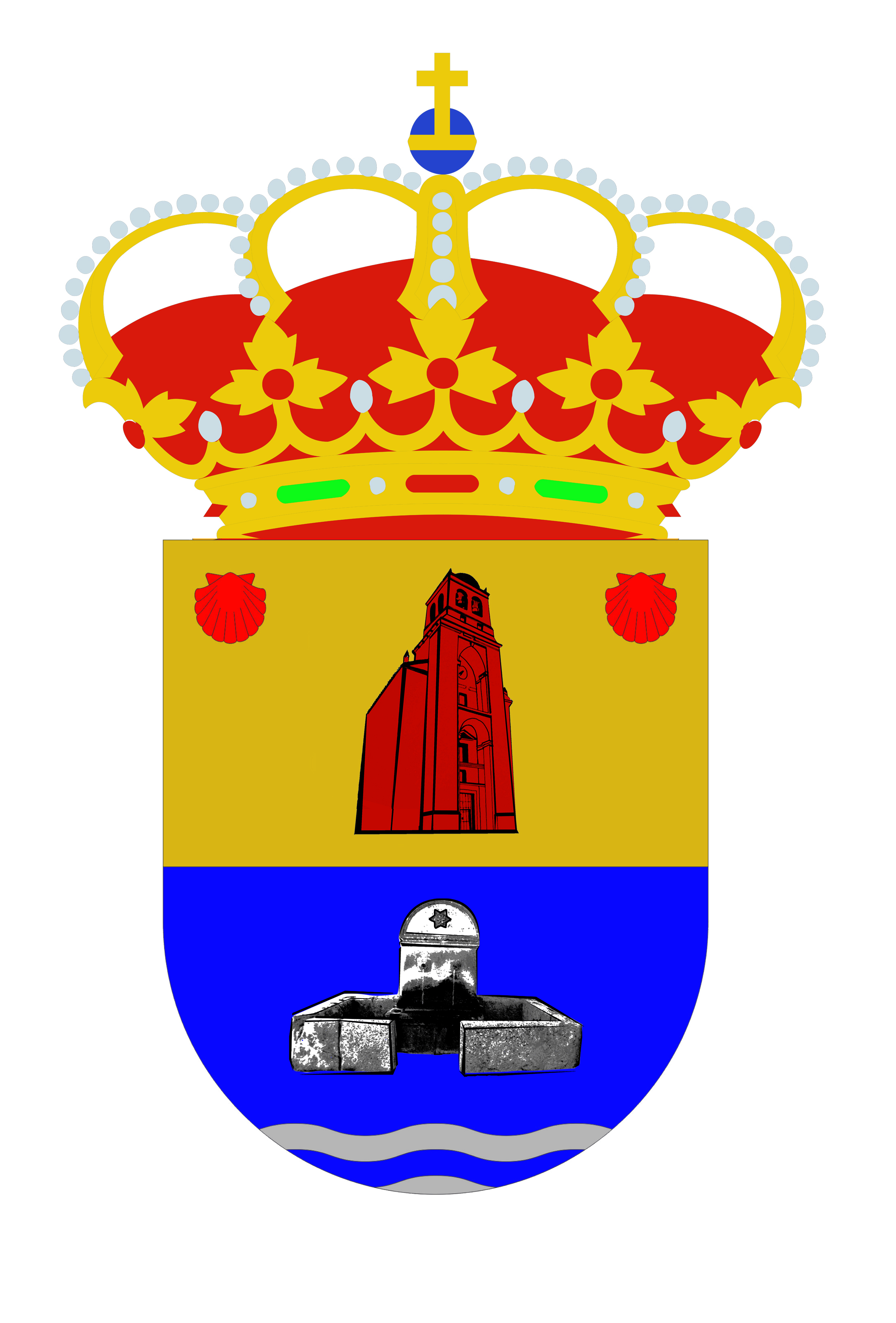
- Coat of arms
- Interactive map of Hontanas
- Country: Spain
- Autonomous community: Castile and León
- Province: Burgos
- Comarca: Odra-Pisuerga

Area
  - Total: 10 km^{2} (3.9 sq mi)
- Elevation: 870 m (2,850 ft)

Population (2025-01-01)
  - Total: 69
  - Density: 6.9/km^{2} (18/sq mi)
- Time zone: UTC+1 (CET)
  - Summer (DST): UTC+2 (CEST)
- Postal code: 09227
- Website: http://www.hontanas.es/

Hontanas is a municipality located in the province of Burgos, Castile and León, Spain. According to the 2004 census (INE), the municipality has a population of 70 inhabitants.
