= Palacios de Riopisuerga =

Coordinates: 42°21′N 4°15′W

- Municipality
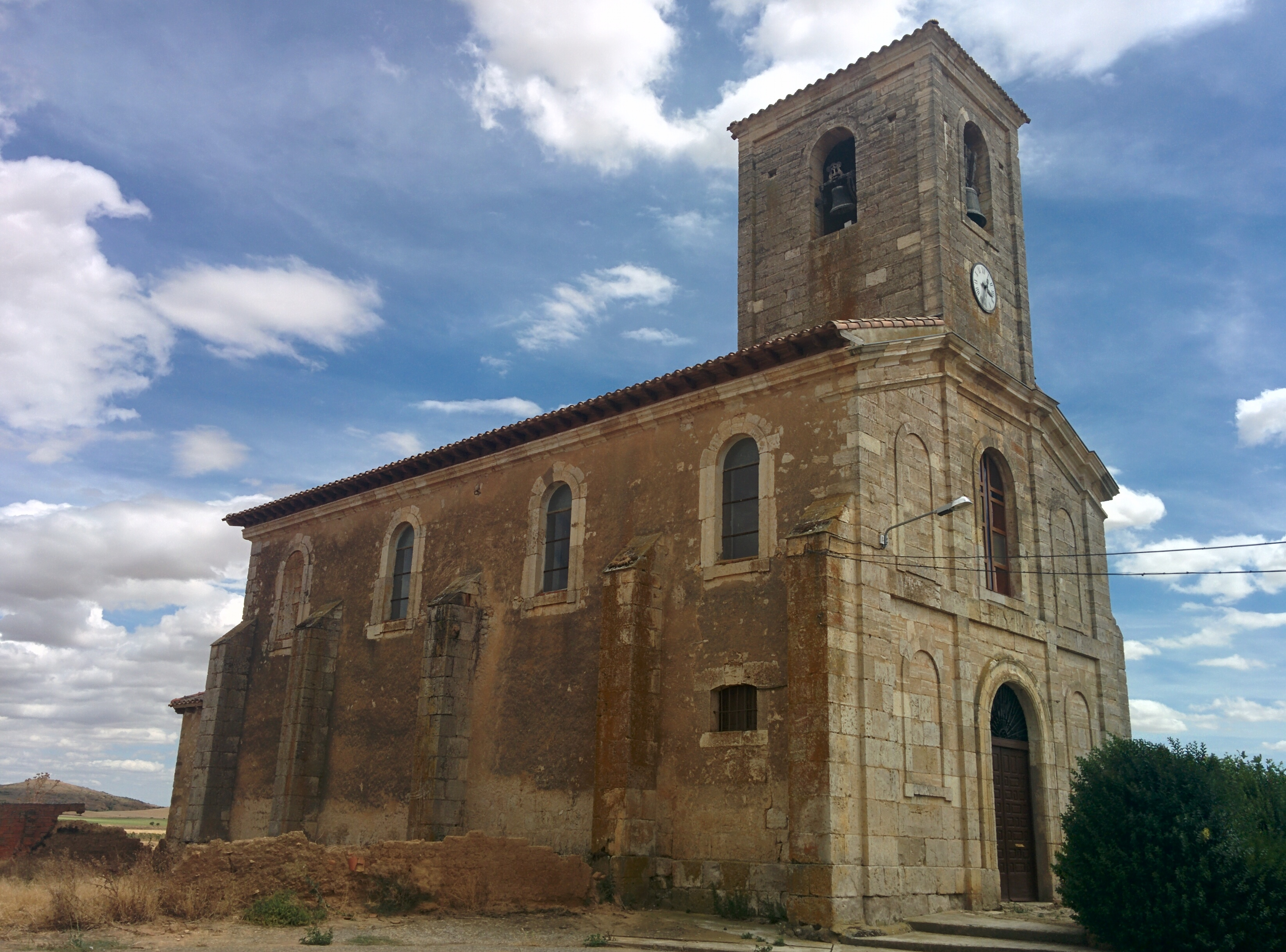
- Interactive map of Palacios de Riopisuerga
- Country: Spain
- Autonomous community: Castile and León
- Province: Burgos
- Comarca: Odra-Pisuerga

Area
  - Total: 10 km^{2} (3.9 sq mi)
- Elevation: 791 m (2,595 ft)

Population (2025-01-01)
  - Total: 19
  - Density: 1.9/km^{2} (4.9/sq mi)
- Time zone: UTC+1 (CET)
  - Summer (DST): UTC+2 (CEST)
- Postal code: 09107
- Climate: Cfb
- Website: http://www.palaciosderiopisuerga.es/

Palacios de Riopisuerga is a municipality and town located in the province of Burgos, Castile and León, Spain. According to the 2004 census (INE), the municipality has a population of 30 inhabitants.
