= Rezmondo =

Coordinates: 42°31′N 4°14′W

- Municipality and town
- Flag Coat of arms
- Interactive map of Rezmondo
- Country: Spain
- Autonomous community: Castile and León
- Province: Burgos
- Comarca: Odra-Pisuerga

Area
  - Total: 6.70 km^{2} (2.59 sq mi)
- Elevation: 835 m (2,740 ft)

Population (2025-01-01)
  - Total: 18
  - Density: 2.7/km^{2} (7.0/sq mi)
- Time zone: UTC+1 (CET)
  - Summer (DST): UTC+2 (CEST)
- Postal code: 09108
- Website: http://www.rezmondo.es/

Rezmondo is a municipality and town located in the province of Burgos, Castile and León, Spain. According to the 2009 census (INE), the municipality has a population of 20 inhabitants.

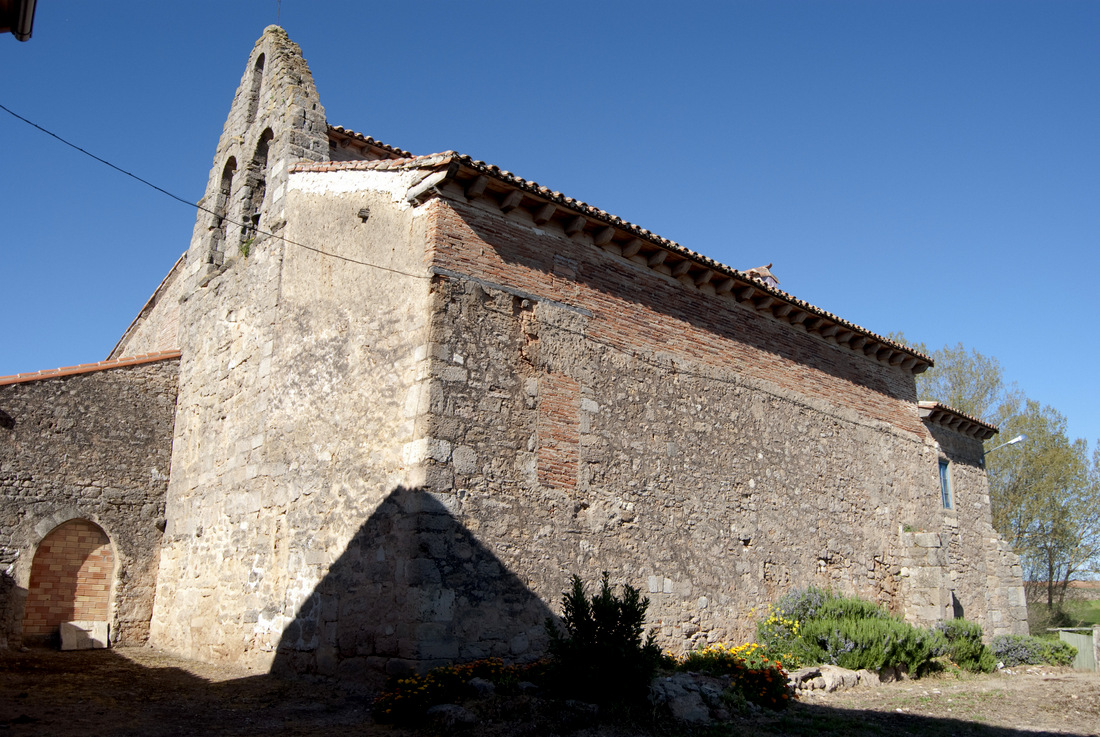
Rezmondo Church
