= Grijalba =

- Municipality and town
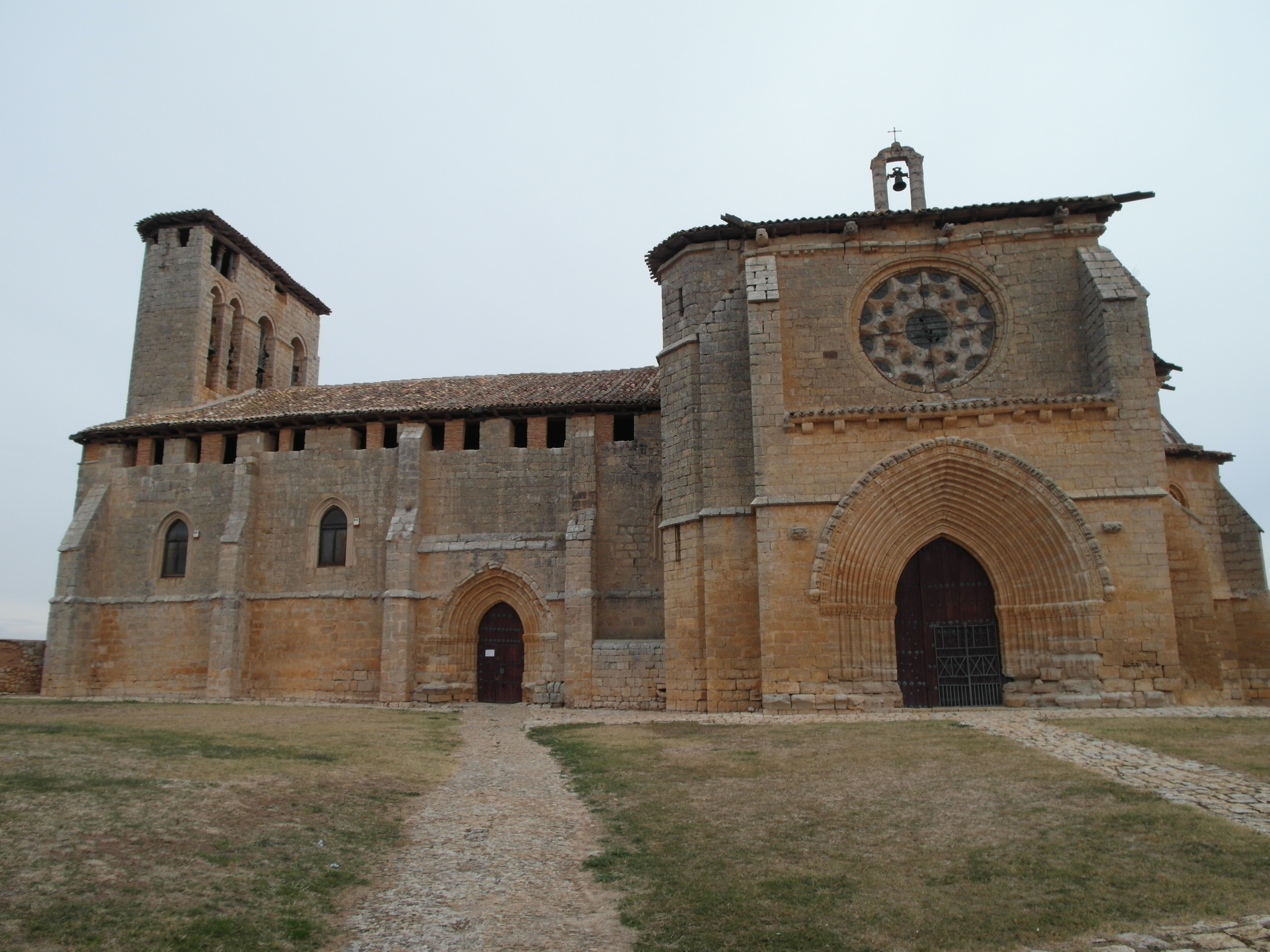
- Nuestra Señora de los Reyes church (13th century)
- Interactive map of Grijalba
- Coordinates: 42°25′43″N 4°7′9″W
- Country: Spain
- Autonomous community: Castile and León
- Province: Burgos
- Comarca: Odra-Pisuerga

Area
  - Total: 20 km^{2} (7.7 sq mi)
- Elevation: 815 m (2,674 ft)

Population (2025-01-01)
  - Total: 114
  - Density: 5.7/km^{2} (15/sq mi)
- Time zone: UTC+1 (CET)
  - Summer (DST): UTC+2 (CEST)
- Postal code: 09128
- Website: http://www.grijalba.es/

Grijalba is a municipality located in the province of Burgos, Castile and León, Spain. According to the 2004 census (INE), the municipality has a population possibly as few as 123 inhabitants.
