= Sordillos =

Coordinates: 42°28′N 4°06′W

- Municipality and town
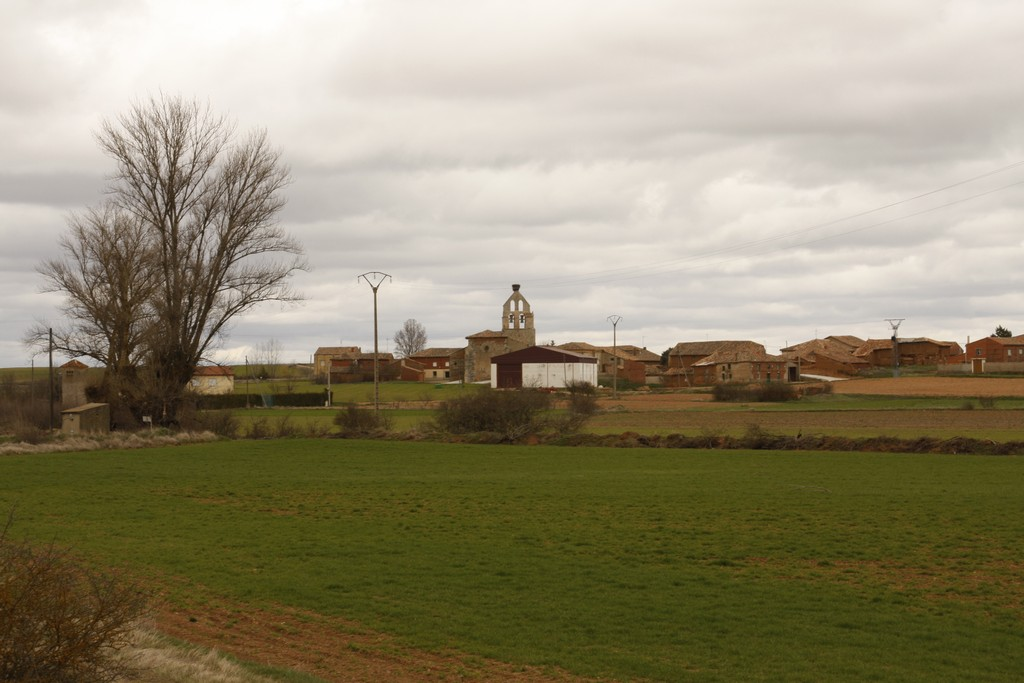
- View of Sordillos, 2010

- Coat of arms
- Interactive map of Sordillos
- Country: Spain
- Autonomous community: Castile and León
- Province: Burgos
- Comarca: Odra-Pisuerga

Area
  - Total: 9 km^{2} (3.5 sq mi)

Population (2025-01-01)
  - Total: 23
  - Density: 2.6/km^{2} (6.6/sq mi)
- Time zone: UTC+1 (CET)
  - Summer (DST): UTC+2 (CEST)
- Postal code: 09128
- Website: http://www.sordillos.es/

Sordillos is a municipality and town located in the province of Burgos, Castile and León, Spain. According to the 2004 census (INE), the municipality had a population of 31 people.
