= Susinos del Páramo =

Coordinates: 42°28′N 3°55′W

- Municipality and town
- Flag Coat of arms
- Interactive map of Susinos del Páramo
- Country: Spain
- Autonomous community: Castile and León
- Province: Burgos
- Comarca: Odra-Pisuerga

Area
  - Total: 11 km^{2} (4.2 sq mi)
- Elevation: 905 m (2,969 ft)

Population (2025-01-01)
  - Total: 115
  - Density: 10/km^{2} (27/sq mi)
- Time zone: UTC+1 (CET)
  - Summer (DST): UTC+2 (CEST)
- Postal code: 09133
- Website: http://www.susinosdelparamo.es/

Susinos del Páramo is a municipality and town located in the province of Burgos, Castile and León, Spain. According to the 2004 census (INE), the municipality has a population of 115 inhabitants.

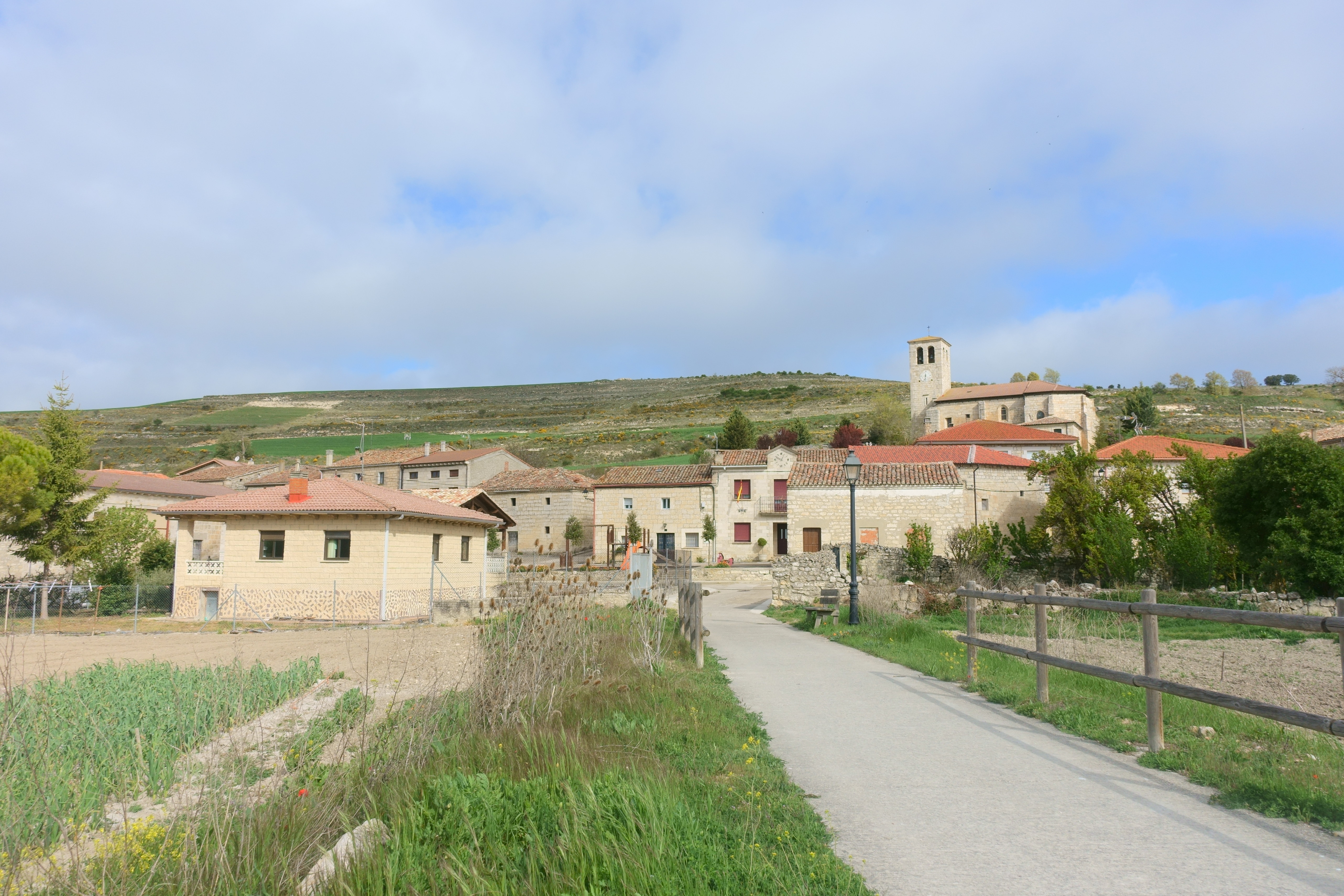
View of Susinos del Páramo, Burgos, Spain
