= Odra (Pisuerga) =

River in Spain

Coordinates: 42.6864°N 4.1031°W

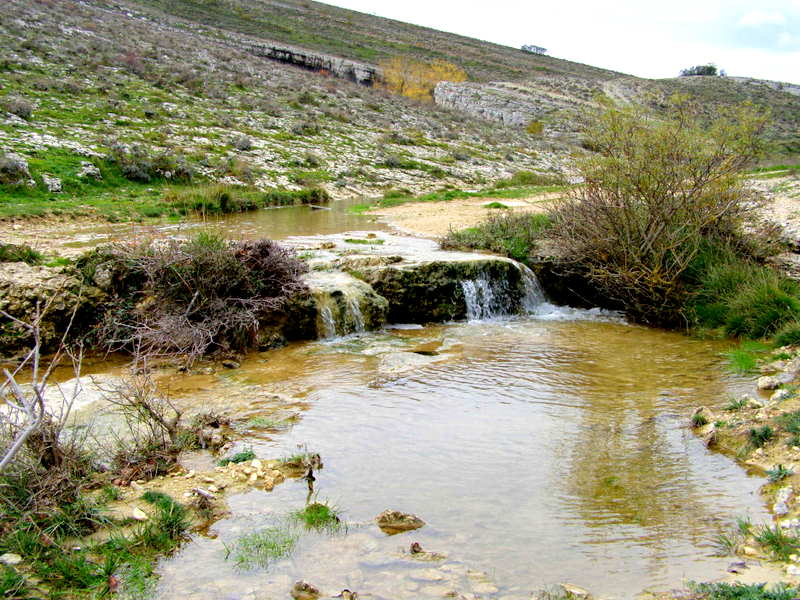
- The river Odra near its sources in Fuenteodra (Páramos)

Location
- Country: Spain

Physical characteristics
- Source: Fuente de la Magdalena
  - location: Fuenteodra, Humada, Páramos, Burgos, Castile and León, Spain
- Mouth: Junta los Ríos, Pisuerga
  - location: Pedrosa del Príncipe, Odra-Pisuerga, Burgos, Castile and León, Spain
  - elevation: 757 m (2,484 ft)
- Length: 65.5 km (40.7 mi)
- Basin size: 798 km^{2} (308 sq mi)

Basin features
- Tributaries
  - left: Brullés

The Odra is a river in Spain. Its springs are located to the north of Amaya mountain in the province of Burgos, from where it flows southward until reaching the Pisuerga River. The main tributary is the Brullés River.

== See also ==
- List of rivers of Spain
