= Pedrosa del Páramo =

Coordinates: 42°26′N 3°58′W

- Municipality and town
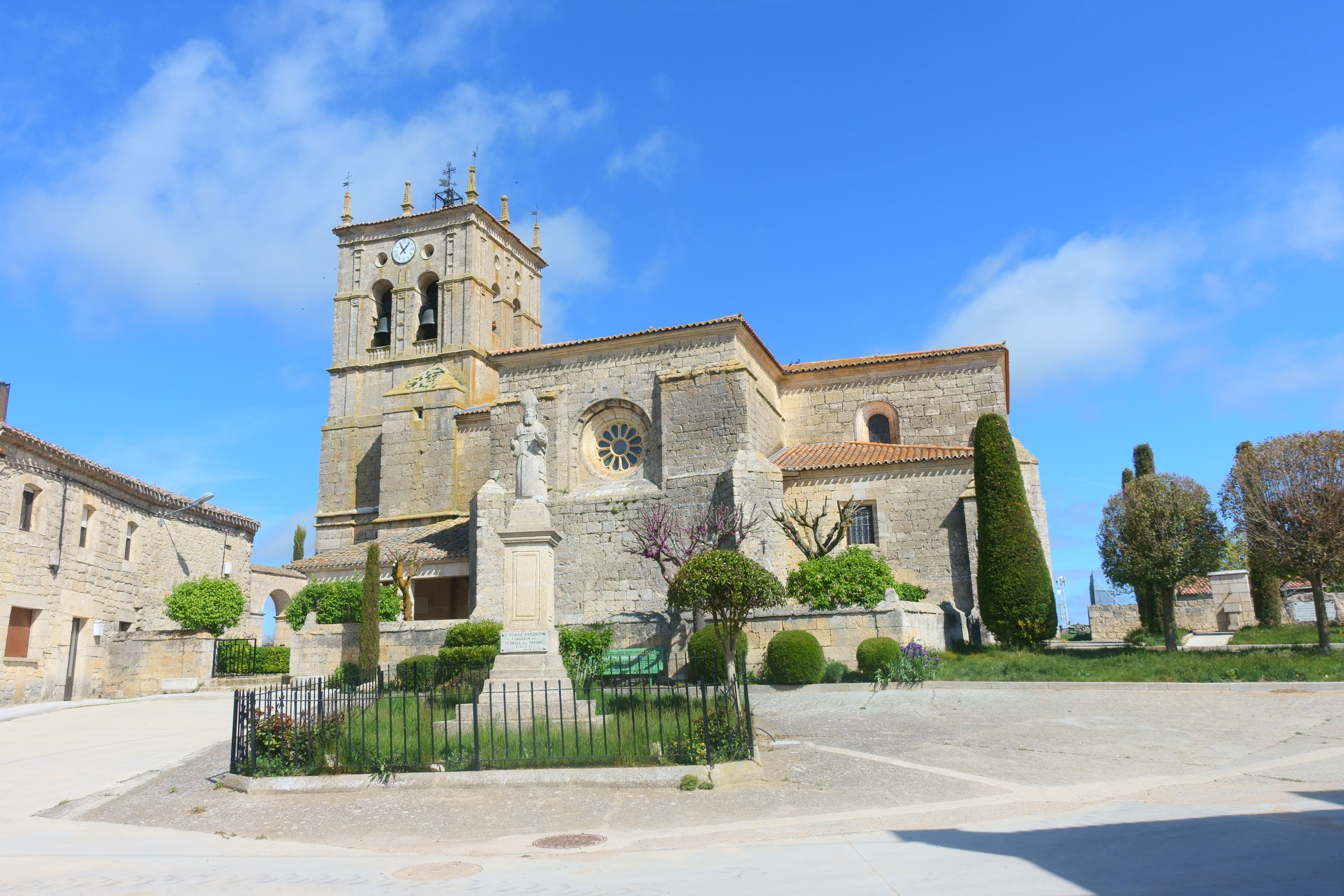
- Church of San Pedro, Pedrosa del Páramo (Burgos, Spain).

- Flag Coat of arms
- Interactive map of Pedrosa del Páramo
- Country: Spain
- Autonomous community: Castile and León
- Province: Burgos
- Comarca: Odra-Pisuerga

Area
  - Total: 11 km^{2} (4.2 sq mi)
- Elevation: 975 m (3,199 ft)

Population (2025-01-01)
  - Total: 88
  - Density: 8.0/km^{2} (21/sq mi)
- Time zone: UTC+1 (CET)
  - Summer (DST): UTC+2 (CEST)
- Postal code: 09133
- Website: http://www.pedrosadelparamo.es/

Pedrosa del Páramo is a municipality located in the province of Burgos, Castile and León, Spain. According to the 2004 census (INE), the municipality has a population of 103 inhabitants.
