= Pedrosa del Príncipe =

Coordinates: 42°15′N 4°12′W

- Municipality and town
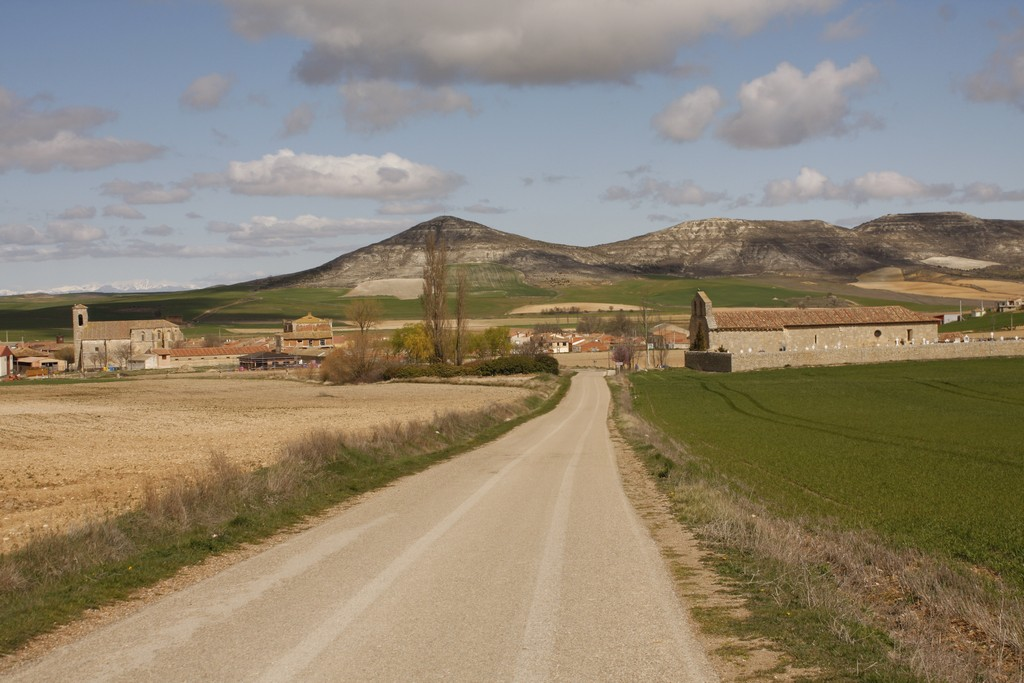
- View of Pedrosa del Príncipe, 2010

- Flag Coat of arms
- Interactive map of Pedrosa del Príncipe
- Country: Spain
- Autonomous community: Castile and León
- Province: Burgos
- Comarca: Odra-Pisuerga

Area
  - Total: 28 km^{2} (11 sq mi)
- Elevation: 771 m (2,530 ft)

Population (2025-01-01)
  - Total: 155
  - Density: 5.5/km^{2} (14/sq mi)
- Time zone: UTC+1 (CET)
  - Summer (DST): UTC+2 (CEST)
- Postal code: 09119
- Website: http://www.pedrosadelprincipe.es/

Pedrosa del Príncipe is a municipality and town located in the province of Burgos, Castile and León, Spain. According to the 2004 census (INE), the municipality has a population of 217 inhabitants.
