= Los Balbases =

Coordinates: 42°13′N 4°04′W

- Municipality
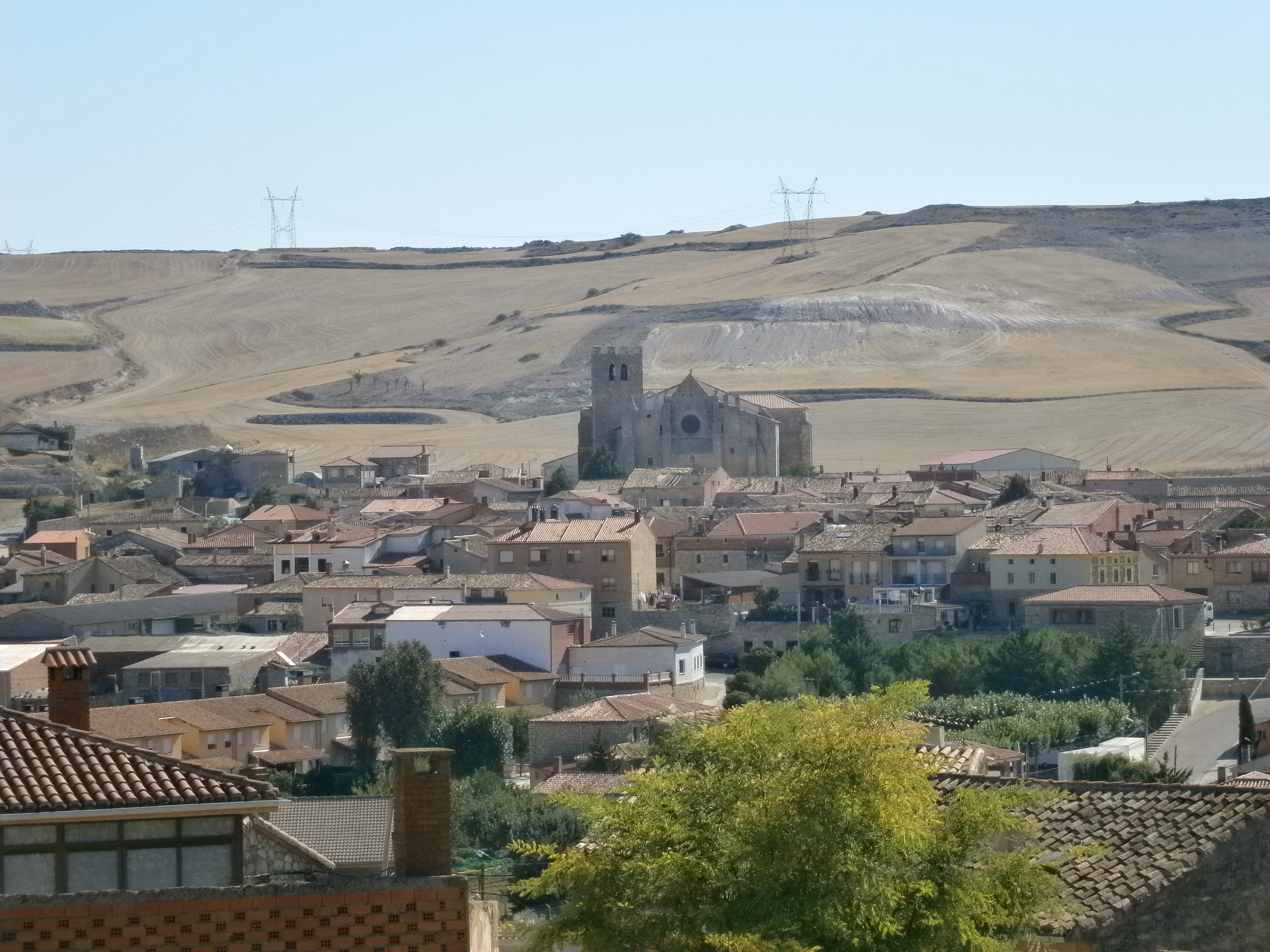
- View of Los Balbases, 2011

- Coat of arms
- Interactive map of Los Balbases
- Country: Spain
- Autonomous community: Castile and León
- Province: Burgos
- Comarca: Odra-Pisuerga

Area
  - Total: 64 km^{2} (25 sq mi)
- Elevation: 812 m (2,664 ft)

Population (2025-01-01)
  - Total: 298
  - Density: 4.7/km^{2} (12/sq mi)
- Time zone: UTC+1 (CET)
  - Summer (DST): UTC+2 (CEST)
- Postal code: 09119
- Website: http://www.losbalbases.es/

Los Balbases is a municipality located in the province of Burgos, Castile and León, Spain. According to the 2004 census (INE), the municipality has a population of 348 inhabitants.

== Sport ==
The 3rd Stage of the 2024 Vuelta a Burgos Feminas passes through Los-Balases on the 18th of may.
