= Villamayor de Treviño =

Coordinates: 42°28′N 4°07′W

Villamayor de Treviño, Spain
- Interactive map of Villamayor de Treviño, Spain
- Country: Spain
- Autonomous community: Castile and León
- Province: Burgos
- Municipality: Villamayor de Treviño

Area
  - Total: 18 km^{2} (6.9 sq mi)

Population (2025-01-01)
  - Total: 59
  - Density: 3.3/km^{2} (8.5/sq mi)
- Time zone: UTC+1 (CET)
  - Summer (DST): UTC+2 (CEST)

Villamayor de Treviño is a municipality located in the province of Burgos, Castile and León, Spain. According to the 2004 census (INE), the municipality has a population of 99 inhabitants.

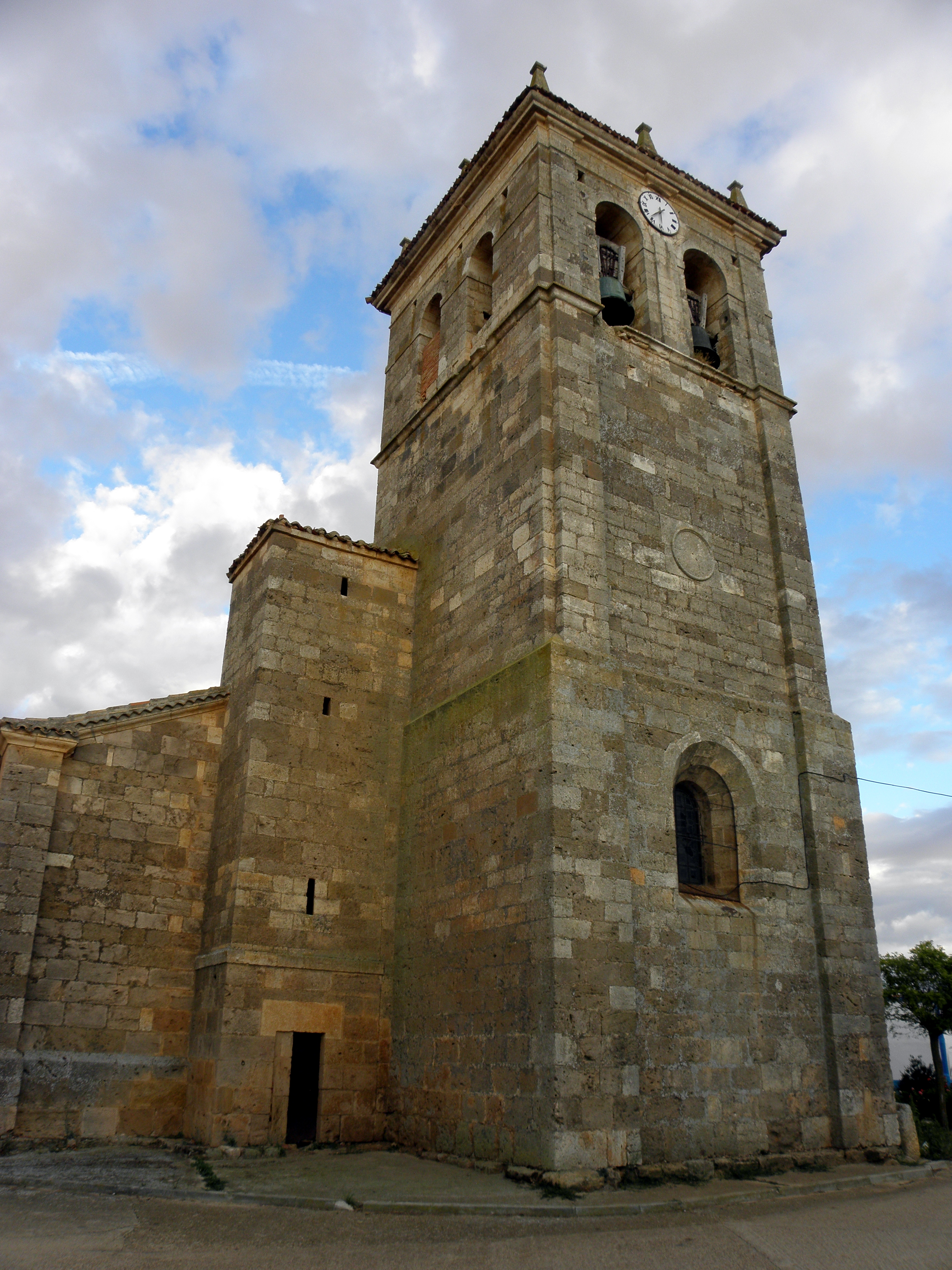
Church of Santa María in Villamayor de Treviño
