= Villadiego =

- Municipality
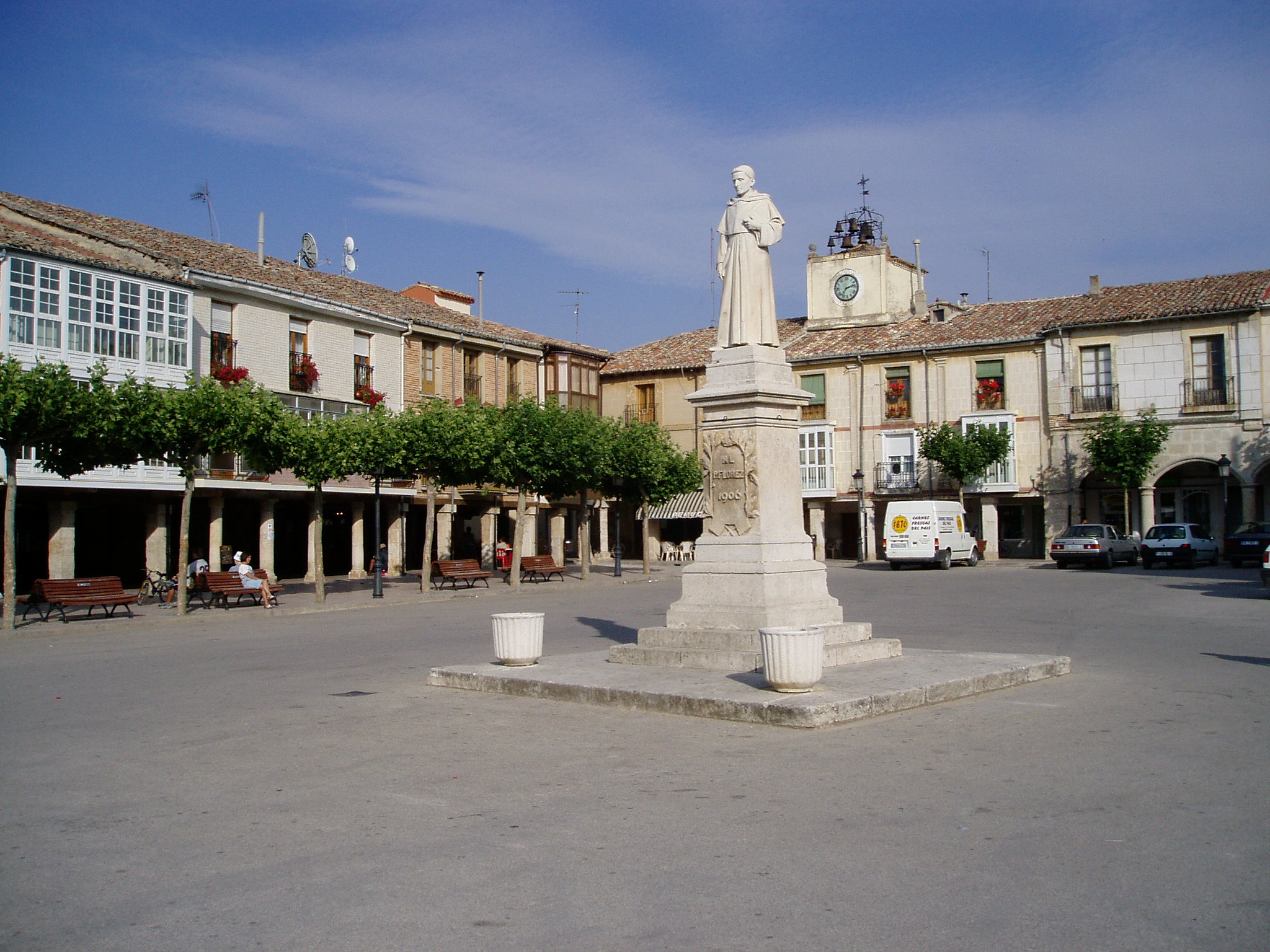
- Villadiego Plaza Porticada

- Flag Coat of arms

- Location Villadiego (Castile and León) Villadiego (Spain)
- Coordinates: 42°30′57″N 04°00′36″W
- Country: Spain
- Autonomous community: Castile and León
- Province: Burgos
- Comarca: Odra-Pisuerga

Area
  - Total: 32,796 km^{2} (12,663 sq mi)
- Elevation: 840 m (2,760 ft)

Population (2025-01-01)
  - Total: 1,453
  - Density: 4.99/km^{2} (12.9/sq mi)
- Time zone: UTC+1 (CET)
  - Summer (DST): UTC+2 (CEST)
- Website: http://www.villadiego.es/

Villadiego is a Spanish town and municipality in the comarca of Odra-Pisuerga, in west of the province of Burgos, Castilla y León. It is seat of the comarca of Odra-Pisuerga. It is located 39 kilometres away from Burgos.

According to demographic data of 2013, it has a population of 1,637 inhabitants, making it the second largest town in the west of the province.

The town was founded by Count Diego Porcelos in the 9th century.

It has large monuments around its most historical part of the town, of which a highlight is the Plaza Porticada and its traditional architecture.

== Location ==
Villadiego is 38 km from Burgos, the provincial capital. It belongs to the Odra-Pisuerga region. Its area is 327,96 km ² and has a population of 1,637 inhabitants (INE 2013). Belonging to the Judicial District of Burgos.

It is the largest municipality of Burgos. It lies northwest of the province, including also terms municipal Humada, Basconcillos del Tozo, Úrbel del Castillo at north; Huérmeces at east; Las Hormazas, Tobar, Manciles, Pedrosa del Páramo, Villegas, Sordillos and Villamayor de Treviño at south; and Sotresgudo at west.

It comprises three historic countries: Amaya, former jurisdiction depended on the strength of the same name, which dominated from the towering Pisuerga the left bank of the river; Los Ordejones, mountainous area where the towns of Villavedón and Villusto are located; the Treviño region is between the Odra River and rivers comprising Brullés Villahizán Villavedón and Treviño.

== Demography ==
In 2013 the population of the municipality was of 1,637 people, 893 men and 744 women

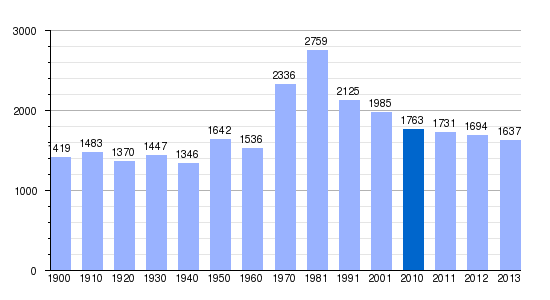
Villadiego population during recent history

The census does not reflect the seasonal nature of much of the population without being registered in Villadiego, live or spend several months of the year in Villadiego. They are mostly people who, with the decline of agriculture in the mid-twentieth century, migrated to the city of Burgos or other provinces and, after retirement, are returning to their hometowns. There are also many homes occupied only on weekends in Villadiego and districts.

== History ==
It was founded by Don Diego Rodriguez Porcelos, Lord of Amaya, in the ninth century.

In the Middle Ages, Villadiego was home to a Jewish community until the 1492 expulsion of the Jews.

In this town was born Enrique Flórez, eighteenth-century historian and author of Sacred Spain.

In the 1787 Census of Floridablanca had the category of town with Mayor and Court of Lordship, being its holder Duque of Frias, head of the party of Villadiego of the Municipality of Burgos, which included in the category of single towns 3 villas, 5 places, 3 farms, 1 inn and one uninhabited, and 7 quadrilles and its own jurisdiction, namely :

- Quadrille Amaya, with 8 places, an inn and one district.
- Quadrille Cañizal, with 6 places.
- Quadrille Treviño County, with 14 places and an inn.
- Quadrille Odra, with 6 places.
- Quadrille Olmos, a villa and 8 places.
- Quadrille Tozo, with 13 places and an inn.
- Quadrille Sandoval, a villa and 5 places.
- Quadrille Valdelucio, with 16 places.
- Jurisdiction Villadiego, a villa, 10 places and a quarter.

== Notable locations ==
The entire town was declared historical on December 29, 1994.

=== Civil architecture ===
- Main Square of Villadiego. Traces of medieval arcaded square.
- Statue of Fray Enrique Flórez, 1906, Aniceto Marinas' work in the center of the Main Square.
- Velasco's palace, of the sixteenth century.
- Porras, Varona, Bustillo, Santa Cruz and Borja houses.
- Artesian well.
- The bullring, built in 1957.

=== Religious architecture ===
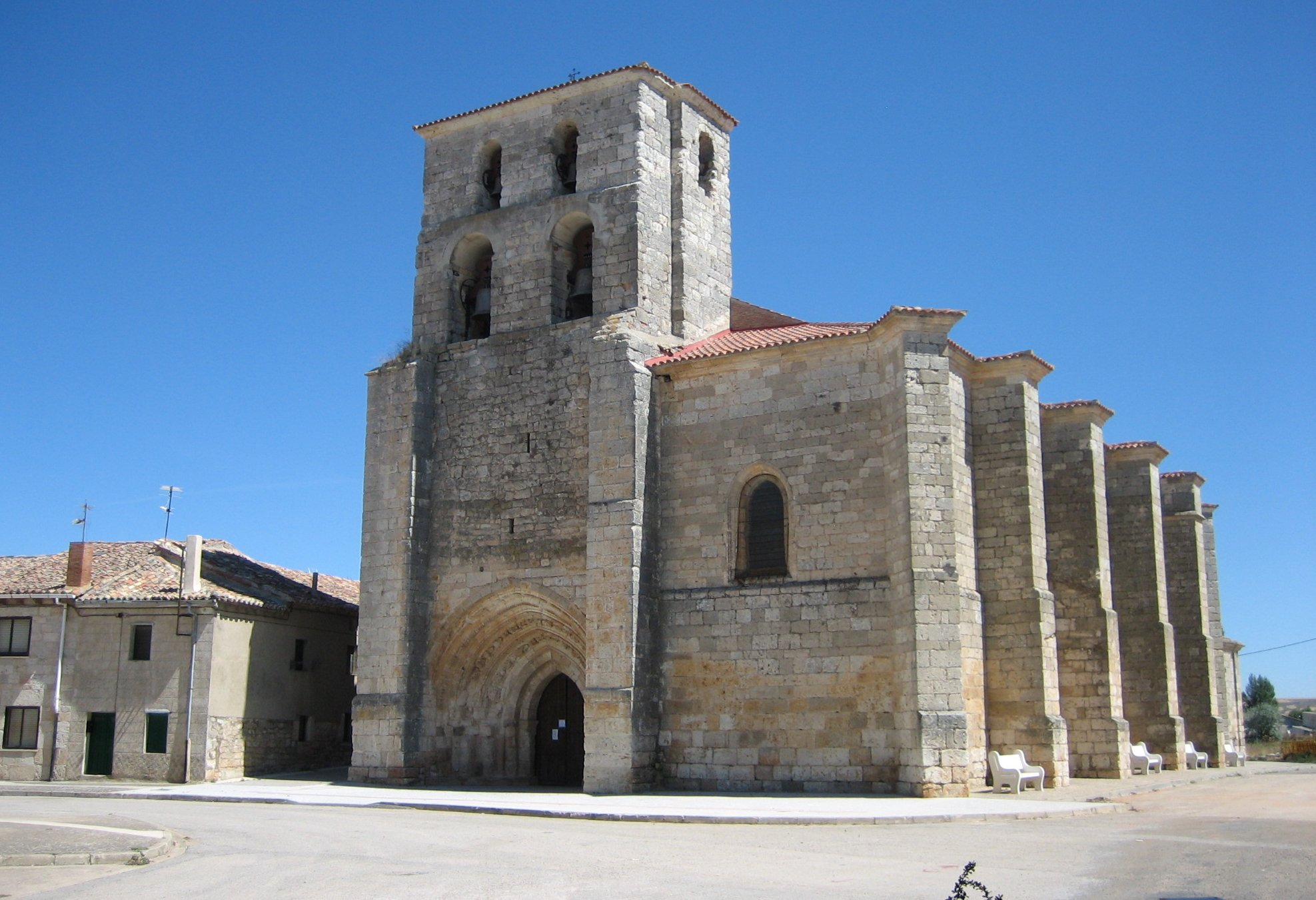
Santa Maria church, Villadiego

- Church of San Lorenzo, built in the fourteenth and fifteenth centuries.
- St. Mary's Church, gothic building of the sixteenth century.
- Convent of San Miguel de los Angeles, gothic church built in the sixteenth century.
- Christ hermitage of the fifteenth century.

=== Museums ===
- Museum of sacred art and religious art at the Church of San Lorenzo.
- Pictorial, ethnographic and paleolithic museums are found on Jail's Arch Street and Vega Street.

=== Sports and leisure ===
- Football field, swimming pool and sports center.
- Villadiego auditorium. Opened in 2011.

== Traditions ==
In the Main Square traditional market, where until recently farmers and ranchers traded in the area with its products, a "party" is held every Monday morning. The festivals are held in the provincial capital in mid-August, in honor of Our Lady of the Assumption and San Roque. In those days a lot of emigrants return to Villadiego to concentrate with their families and friends. A lot of people of Villadiego participate in these festivals with their "troop" of friends to prepare floats, go to the Bulls, organize competitions, etc.

Since the late 1990s there have been attempts to recover the tradition of Judas' function, celebrated during the afternoon and evening of Easter Sunday. This currently consists of a large and colorful parade of costumed soldiers in the manner of the nineteenth century, followed by the staging of a battle, capture, trial and burning of Judas, all accompanied by music, lights and fireworks.
