= Iglesias, Province of Burgos =

Coordinates: 42°18′N 3°59′W

Iglesias
- Municipality and town
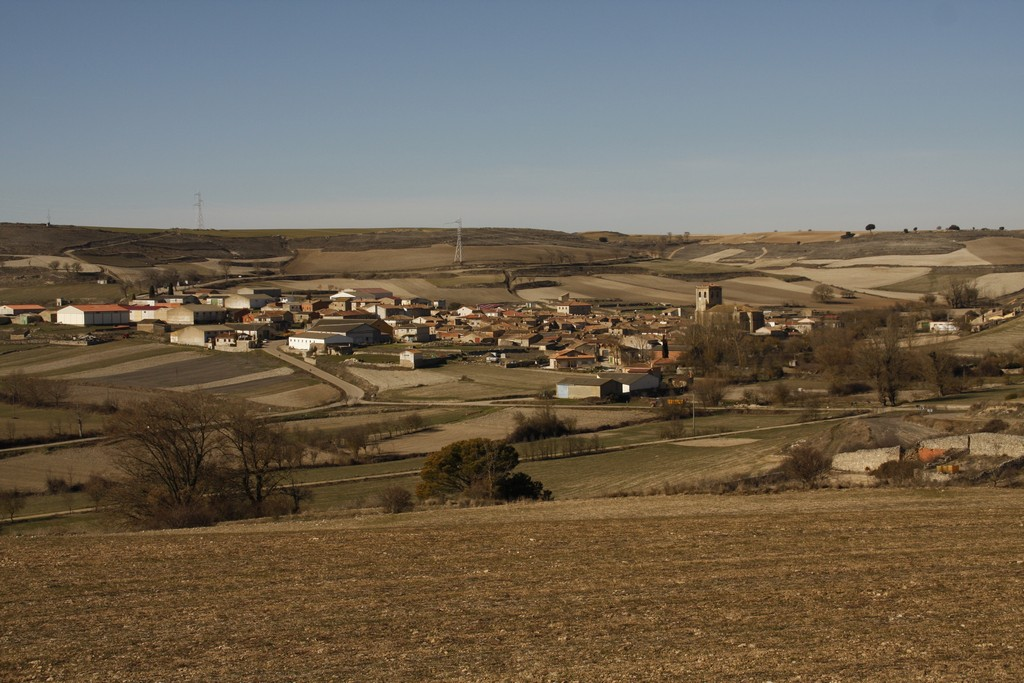
- View of Iglesias, 2010

- Flag Coat of arms
- Interactive map of Iglesias
- Country: Spain
- Autonomous community: Castile and León
- Province: Burgos
- Comarca: Odra-Pisuerga

Area
  - Total: 35 km^{2} (14 sq mi)
- Elevation: 844 m (2,769 ft)

Population (2025-01-01)
  - Total: 136
  - Density: 3.9/km^{2} (10/sq mi)
- Time zone: UTC+1 (CET)
  - Summer (DST): UTC+2 (CEST)
- Postal code: 09227
- Website: http://www.iglesias.es/

Iglesias (pronounced [iˈɡleːzjas]) is a municipality located in the province of Burgos, Castile and León, Spain.
