= Anthonians =

Anthonians applies to four Catholic Religious communities or Orders and a single Chaldean one, all under the patronage of St. Anthony the Hermit, father of monasticism, or professing to follow his rule.

== Disciples of St. Anthony (Antonians) ==
Men drawn to his hermitage in the Thebaid (Egypt) by the fame of his holiness, and forming the first monastic communities. Having changed his abode for the sake of solitude, the saint was again surrounded by followers (according to Rufinus, 6,000), living apart or in common. These he guided solely by his word and example.

The rule bearing his name was compiled from his letters and precepts. There are still in the Orient a number of monasteries claiming St. Anthony's rule, but in reality their rules date no further back than St. Basil.

The Maronite Antonians were divided into two congregations called St. Isaiah and St. Eliseus, or St. Anthony. Their constitutions were approved by Clement XII, the former in 1740, the latter in 1732. The former has 19 convents and 10 hospices; the latter, which has been subdivided, 10 convents and 8 hospices under the Aleppo branch, and 31 convents and 27 hospices under the Baladite branch.

== Antonines (Hospital Brothers of St. Anthony) ==
A congregation founded by a certain Gaston of Dauphiné (c. 1095) and his son, in thanksgiving for miraculous relief from "St. Anthony's fire", a disease then epidemic. Near the Church of St. Anthony at Saint-Antoine-l'Abbaye (then called Saint-Didier de la Mothe) they built a hospital, which became the central house of the order. The members devoted themselves to the care of the sick, particularly those afflicted with the disease above mentioned, they wore a black habit with the Greek letter Tau (St. Anthony's cross) in blue.

At first laymen, they received monastic vows from Pope Honorius III (1218), and were constituted canons regular with the Rule of St. Augustine by Boniface VIII (1297). The congregation spread through France, Spain, and Italy, and gave the Church a number of distinguished scholars and prelates. Among their privileges was that of caring for the sick of the papal household. With wealth came relaxation of discipline and a reform was ordained (1616) and partially carried out. In 1777 the congregation was canonically united with the Knights of Malta but was suppressed during the French Revolution.

== Antonians ==
A congregation of orthodox Armenians founded during the seventeenth century at the time of the persecutions of Catholic Armenians. Abram Atar Poresigh retired to the Libanus with three companions, and founded the monastery of the Most Holy Saviour under the protection of St. Anthony, to supply members for mission work.

A second foundation was made on Mount Lebanon, and a third in Rome (1753), which was approved by Clement XIII. Some members of this congregation took a prominent part in the Armenian Schism (1870–80).

== Congregation of Saint Anthony ==
Founded in Flanders in 1615, and placed under the rule of St. Augustine by Pope Paul V, and under the jurisdiction of the provincial of the Belgian Augustinians. The only monastery was called Castelletum.

== Chaldean Antonians ==
Of the Congregation of Saint-Homisdas, founded by Gabriel Dambo (1809) in Mesopotamia. They have 4 convents and several parishes and stations.
