= Páramos (comarca) =

Coordinates: 42°42′N 3°59′W

- Comarca
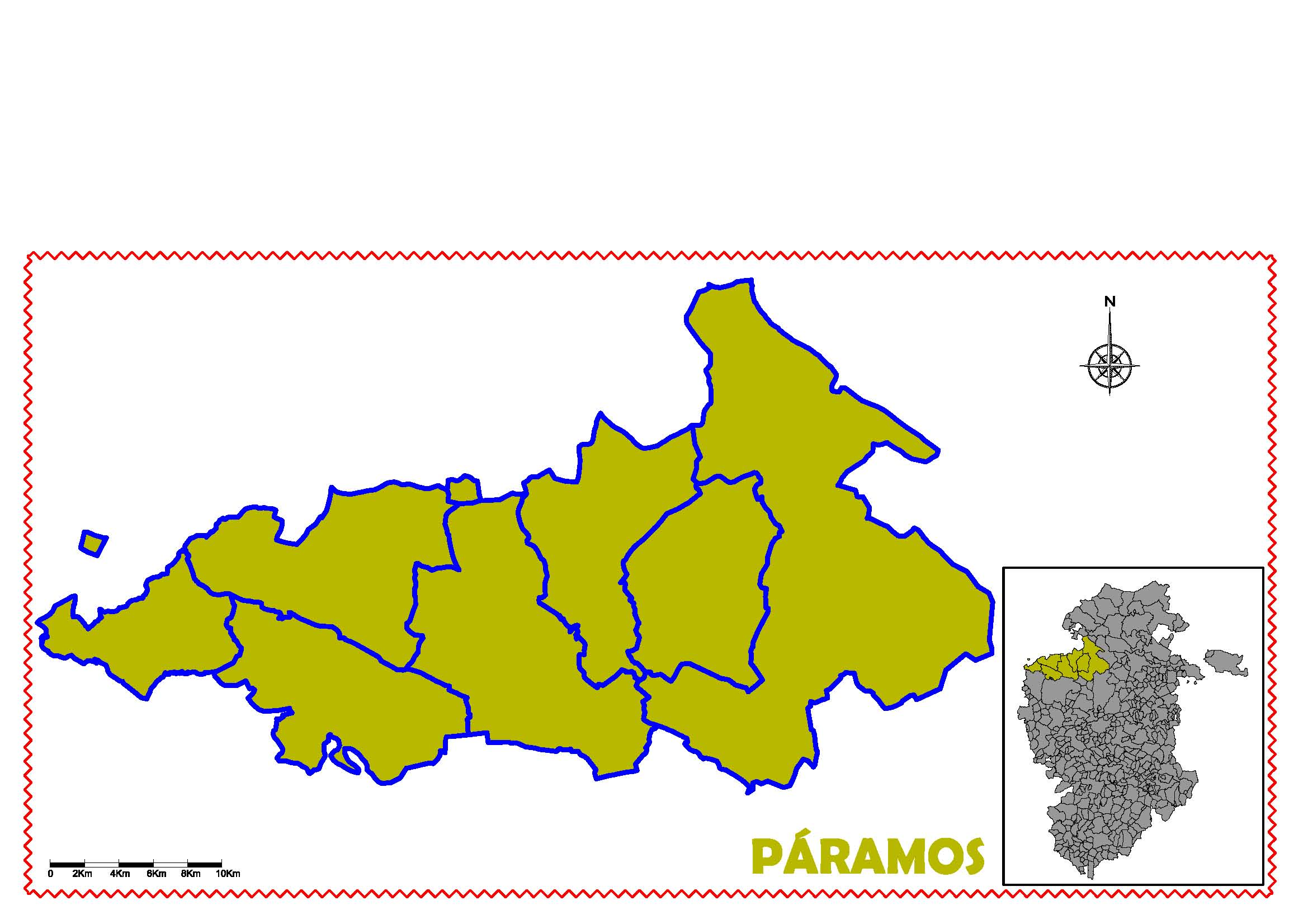
- Country: Spain
- Autonomous community: Castile and León
- Province: Burgos
- Capital: Sedano
- Municipalities: List: See text

Area
  - Total: 862 km^{2} (333 sq mi)
- Elevation: 810 m (2,660 ft)

Population (2004)
  - Total: 3,029
  - Density: 3.51/km^{2} (9.10/sq mi)
- Time zone: UTC+1 (CET)
  - Summer (DST): UTC+2 (CEST)
- Largest municipality: Sedano

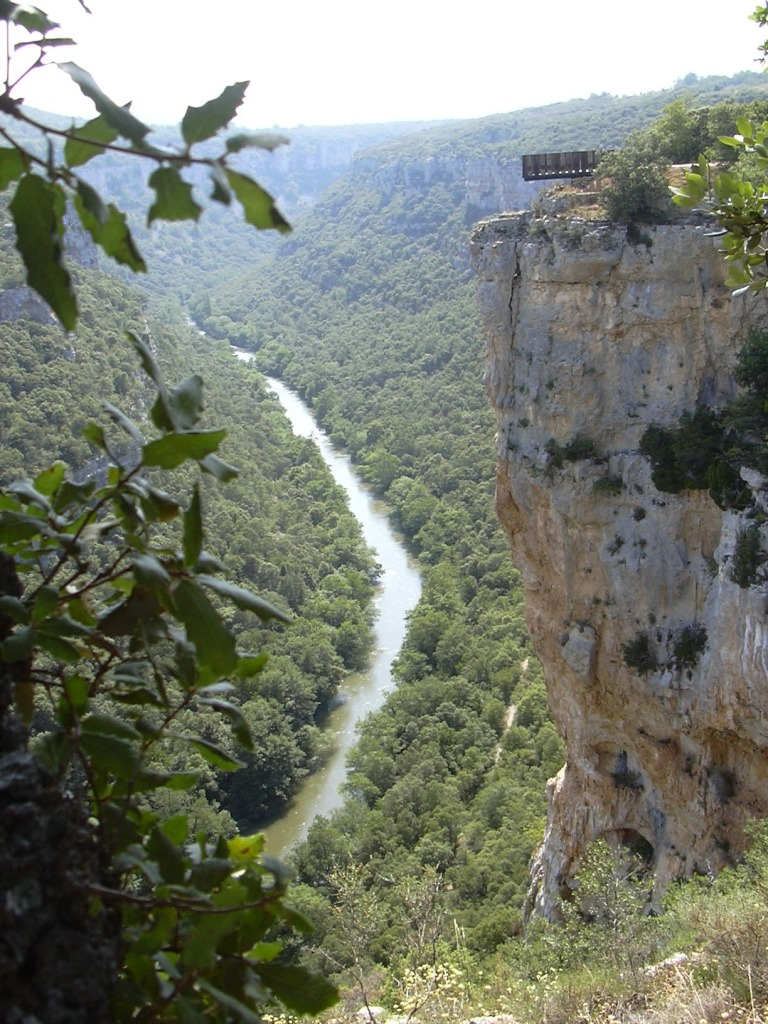
The Ebro gorges near Pesquera de Ebro

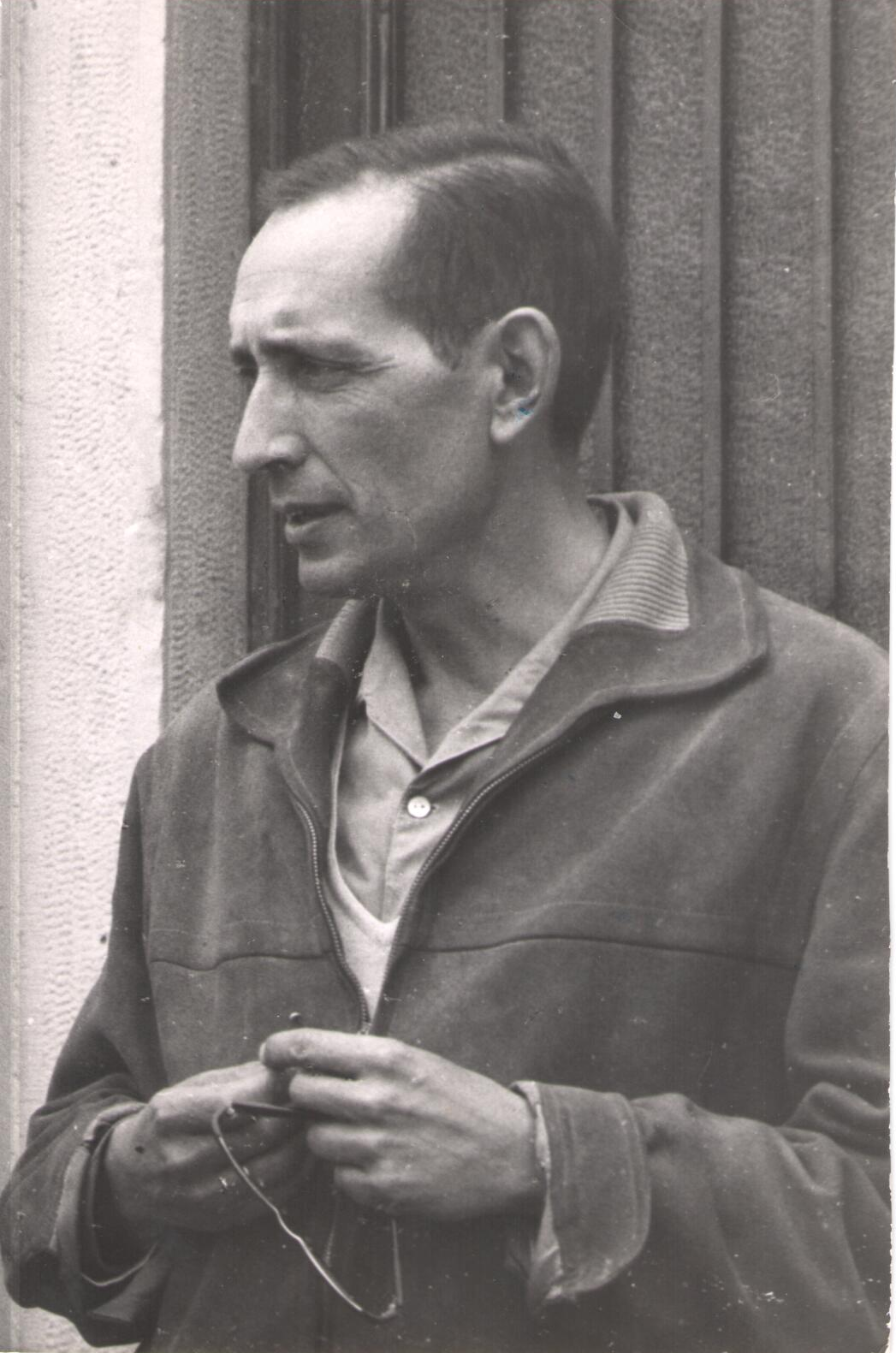
Miguel Delibes in Valle de Sedano, 1960.

Páramos, also known as "Sedano y Las Loras", is a comarca located northwest of the province of Burgos in the autonomous community of Castile and León. It is bounded on the north-east by the Merindades, north-west by Cantabria, west by the Province of Palencia, and in the south by the Alfoz de Burgos and Odra-Pisuerga comarcas.

== Administrative Entities ==
Municipalities and villages:

- Sargentes de la Lora
  - Ayoluengo
  - Moradillo del Castillo
  - San Andrés de Montearados
  - Santa Coloma del Rudrón
  - Valdeajos
- Basconcillos del Tozo (El Tozo)
  - Arcellares
  - Barrio Panizares
  - Fuente Úrbel
  - Hoyos del Tozo
  - La Piedra
  - La Rad
  - Prádanos del Tozo
  - San Mamés de Abar
  - Talamillo del Tozo
  - Trasahedo
- Sedano
  - Cortiguera
  - Cubillo del Butrón
  - Escalada
  - Gredilla de Sedano
  - Moradillo de Sedano
  - Nidáguila
  - Nocedo
  - Orbaneja del Castillo
  - Pesquera de Ebro
  - Quintanaloma
  - Quintanilla Escalada
  - Terradillos de Sedano
  - Turzo
  - Valdelateja
- Valle del Rudrón
  - Tubilla del Agua
  - Bañuelos del Rudrón
  - Covanera
  - San Felices del Rudrón
  - Tablada del Rudrón
- Rebolledo de la Torre
  - Albacastro
  - Castrecias
  - La Rebolleda
  - Valtierra de Albacastro
  - Villela
- Valle de Valdelucio
  - Barrio-Lucio
  - Corralejo
  - Escuderos
  - Fuentecaliente de Lucio
  - Llanillo
  - Mundilla
  - Paul
  - Pedrosa de Valdelucio
  - Quintanas de Valdelucio
  - Renedo de La Escalera
  - Riba de Valdelucio
  - Solanas de Valdelucio
  - Villaescobedo
- Humada
  - Congosto
  - Fuencaliente de Puerta
  - Fuenteodra
  - Los Ordejones
  - Ordejón de Abajo
  - Ordejón de Arriba
  - Rebolledo de Traspeña
  - San Martín de Humada
  - Villamartín de Villadiego
- Úrbel del Castillo
  - La Nuez de Arriba
  - Quintana del Pino

== History ==
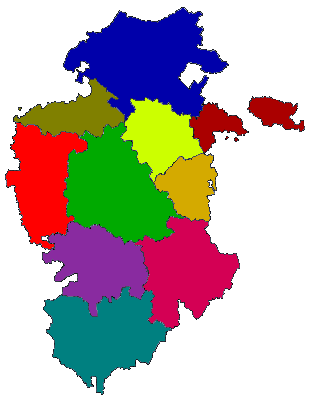
Shires of the province of Burgos.: Páramos Alfoz de Burgos Odra y Pisuerga Arlanza Ribera del Duero / Merindades Ebro La Bureba Montes de Oca Sierra de la Demanda

== See also ==
- Province of Burgos
- Valle del Rudrón
