= Valle de Sedano =

Coordinates: 42.7154°N 3.74961°W

- municipality
- Flag Coat of arms

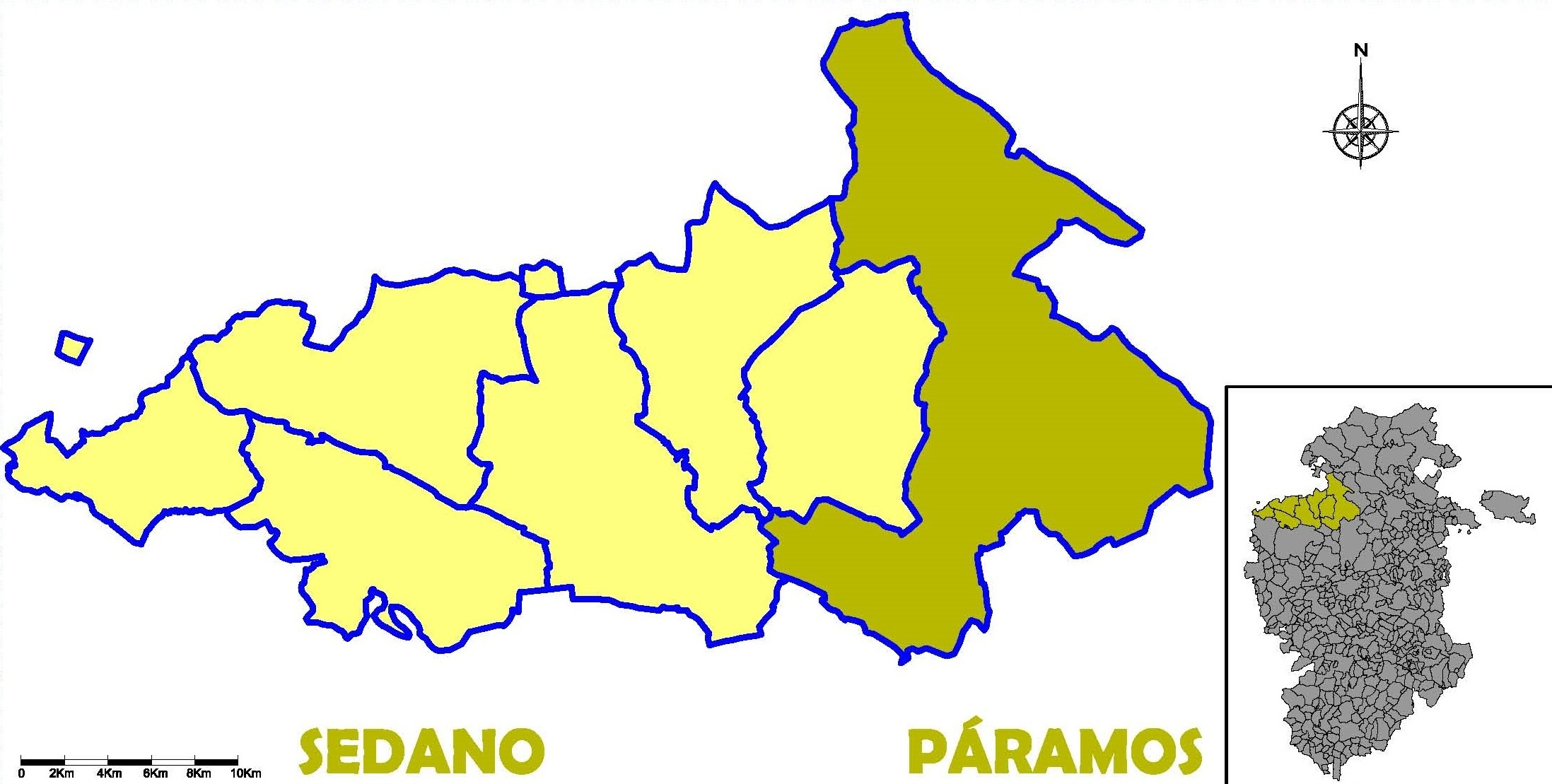
- Country: Spain
- Autonomous community: Castile and León
- Province: Burgos
- Comarca: Páramos

Area
  - Total: 264 km^{2} (102 sq mi)

Population (2025-01-01)
  - Total: 402
  - Density: 1.52/km^{2} (3.94/sq mi)
- Time zone: UTC+1 (CET)
  - Summer (DST): UTC+2 (CEST)

Valle de Sedano is a municipality located in the province of Burgos, Castile and León, Spain. According to the 2004 census (INE), the municipality has a population of 541 inhabitants.

== Geography ==
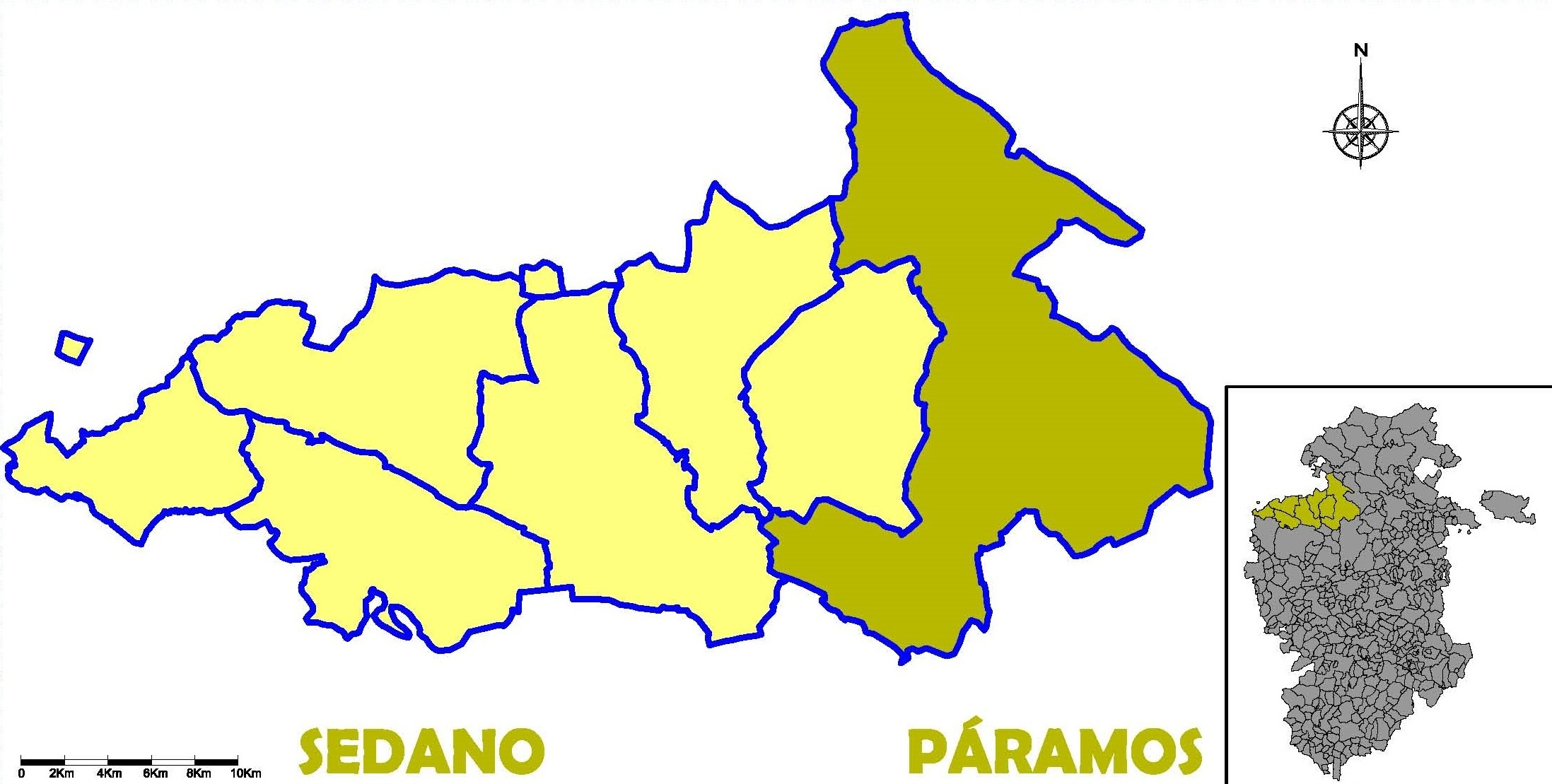
Location of the municipality of Valle de Sedano in the Páramos region

It has an area of 264 km² with a population of 409 inhabitants and a population density of 1.55 inhabitants/km².

The Sedano Valley is a land shaped by its people and its topography, which is reflected in its traditions and architecture. Nearby is the Ebro Canyon as it passes through Orbaneja del Castillo, a natural and scenic area in northern Spain. The Sedano region boasts a collection of Romanesque art. Hiking trails, Romanesque art, and vernacular architecture define the valley's offerings.

The Sedano Valley and La Lora area contains a collection of dolmens and megalithic sites erected some 5,000 years ago, one of the largest in Europe. These dolmens generally belong to the type known as "passage graves," consisting of a circular chamber accessed by a passage or corridor oriented to the southeast. In La Lora, more than 30 funerary monuments have been cataloged, but only five have been restored or reconstructed: El Moreco in Huidobro, Las Arnillas in Moradillo de Sedano (undoubtedly the most spectacular), La Cotorrita in Porquera de Butrón, La Cabaña in Sargentes de la Lora, and Valdemuriel in Tubilla del Agua. Furthermore, an Archaeological Classroom has been opened in Sedano, where the meaning and characteristics of these burial structures are explained, presented, and recreated.

Since 2017, the municipality has been included in the Las Loras Geopark, the first UNESCO geopark in Castile and León.

== History ==
Valle de Sedano, in the district of Burgos, one of fourteen districts that made up the Intendency of Burgos, during the period between 1785 and 1833, according to the Floridablanca Census, comprising the town of Sedano, 26 villages, and 1 neighborhood. During the Late Middle Ages and the Old Regime, the lordship of these lands belonged to the Marquis of Aguilar de Campoo. The writer Miguel Delibes spent his summers in this town.

Today they belong to the municipalities of Los Altos (2), Sargentes de la Lora (6) and Valle de Sedano (14).

== Villages ==
- Sedano
- Cortiguera
- Cubillo del Butrón
- Escalada
- Gredilla de Sedano
- Huidobro
- Moradillo de Sedano
- Nidáguila
- Nocedo
- Orbaneja del Castillo
- Pesquera de Ebro
- Quintanaloma
- Quintanilla Escalada
- Terradillos de Sedano
- Turzo
- Valdelateja

== See also ==
- Páramos
- Valle del Rudrón
