= Basconcillos del Tozo =

Coordinates: 42°42′N 3°59′W

- Municipality and town
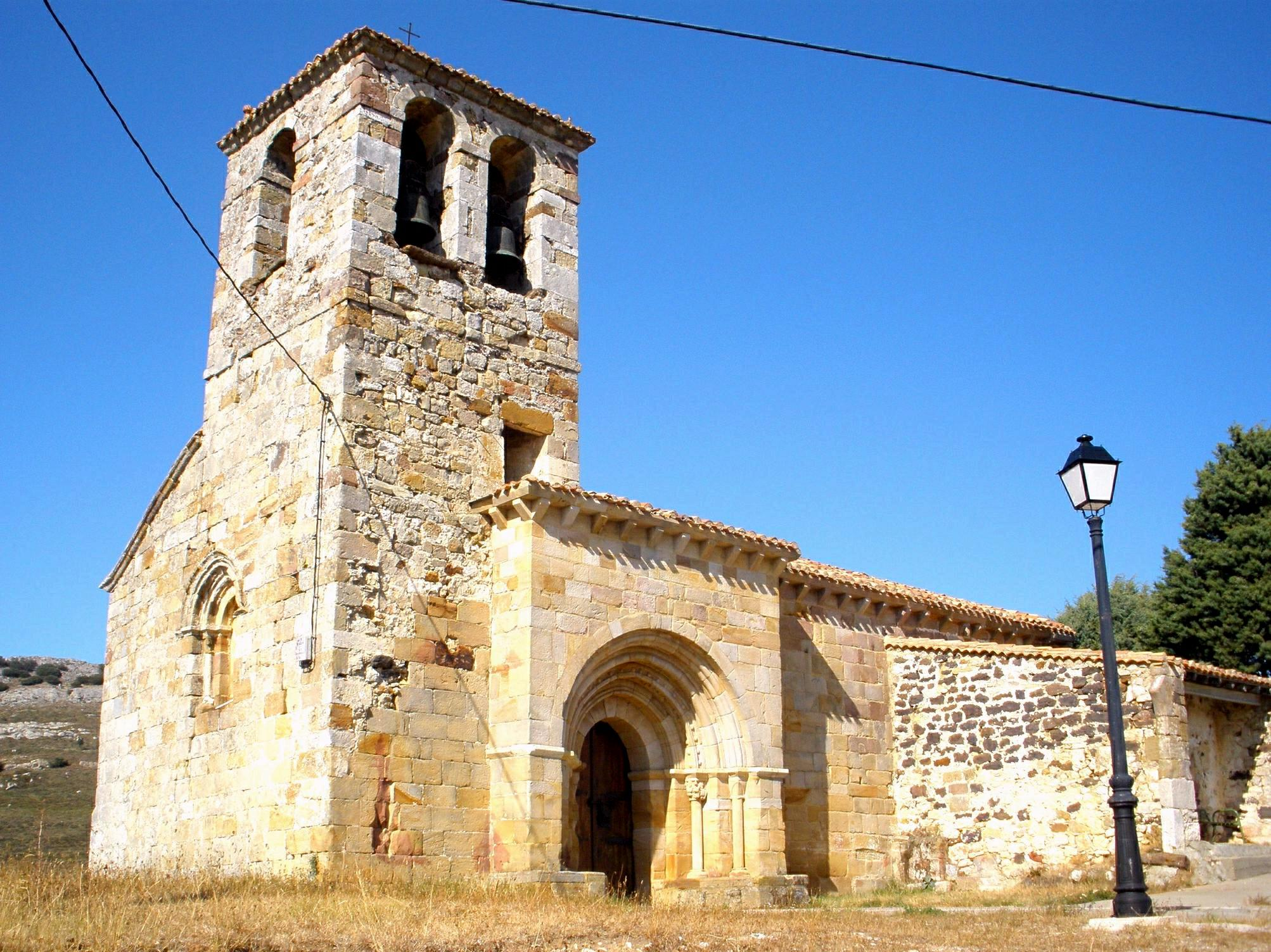
- San Cosme y San Damian church (13th century)

- Flag Coat of arms

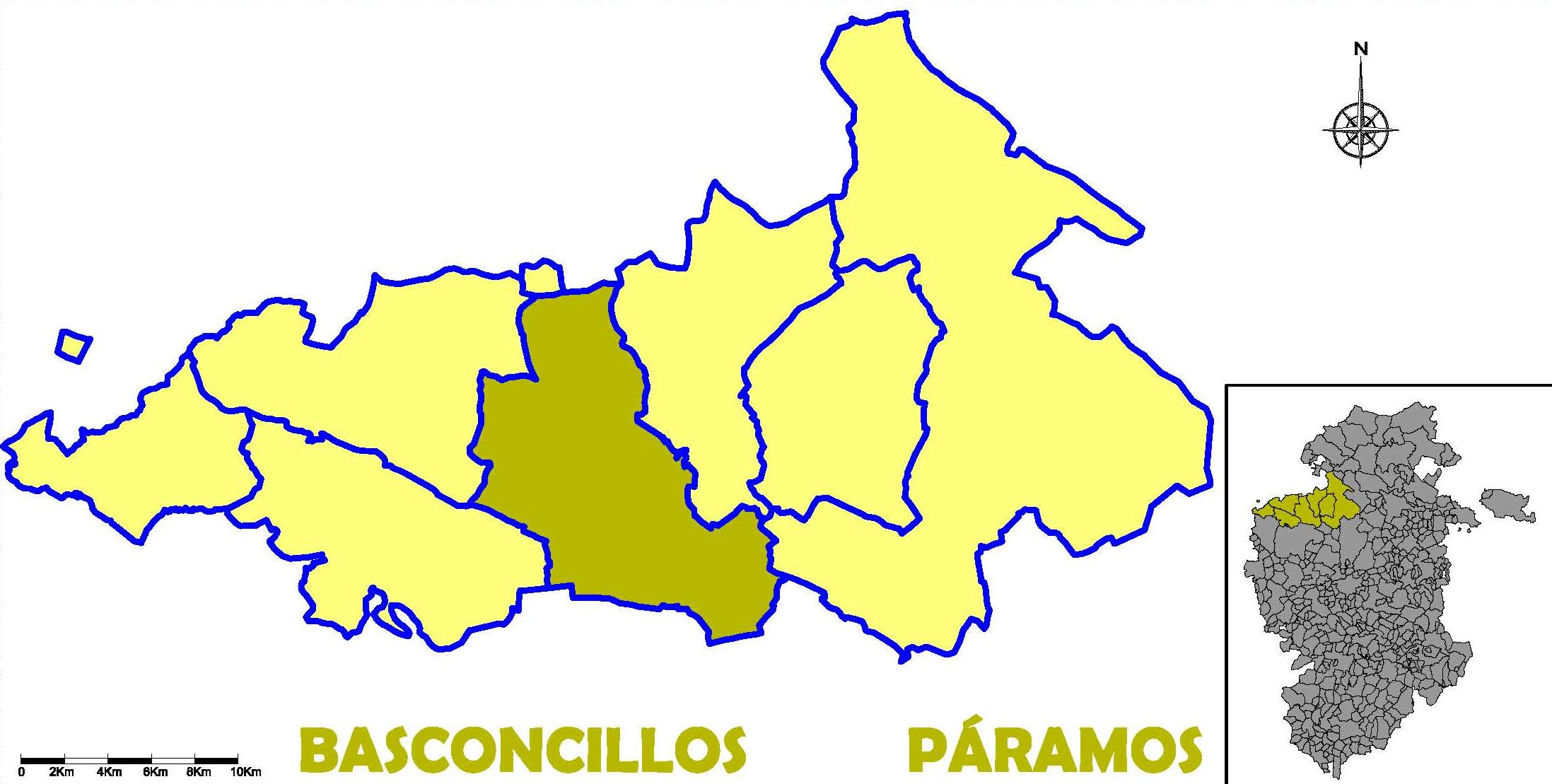
- Municipal location of Basconcillos de Tozo in the Páramos comarca
- Country: Spain
- Autonomous community: Castile and León
- Province: Burgos
- Comarca: Páramos

Area
  - Total: 121 km^{2} (47 sq mi)
- Elevation: 917 m (3,009 ft)

Population (2025-01-01)
  - Total: 276
  - Density: 2.28/km^{2} (5.91/sq mi)
- Time zone: UTC+1 (CET)
  - Summer (DST): UTC+2 (CEST)
- Postal code: 09126
- Website: http://www.basconcillosdeltozo.es/

Basconcillos del Tozo is a municipality and town located in the province of Burgos, Castile and León, Spain. According to the 2004 census (INE), the municipality has a population of 371 inhabitants.

The municipality of Basconcillos del Tozo is made up of twelve towns: Basconcillos del Tozo (seat or capital), Arcellares, Barrio Panizares, Fuente úrbel, Hoyos del Tozo, La Piedra, La Rad, Prádanos del Tozo, San Mamés de Abar, Santa Cruz del Tozo, Talamillo del Tozo and Trasahedo.

== See also ==
- Páramos (comarca)
- Valle del Rudrón
