= Valle de Valdelucio =

Coordinates: 42°43′5.61″N 4°05′32.4″W

- municipality
- Flag Coat of arms

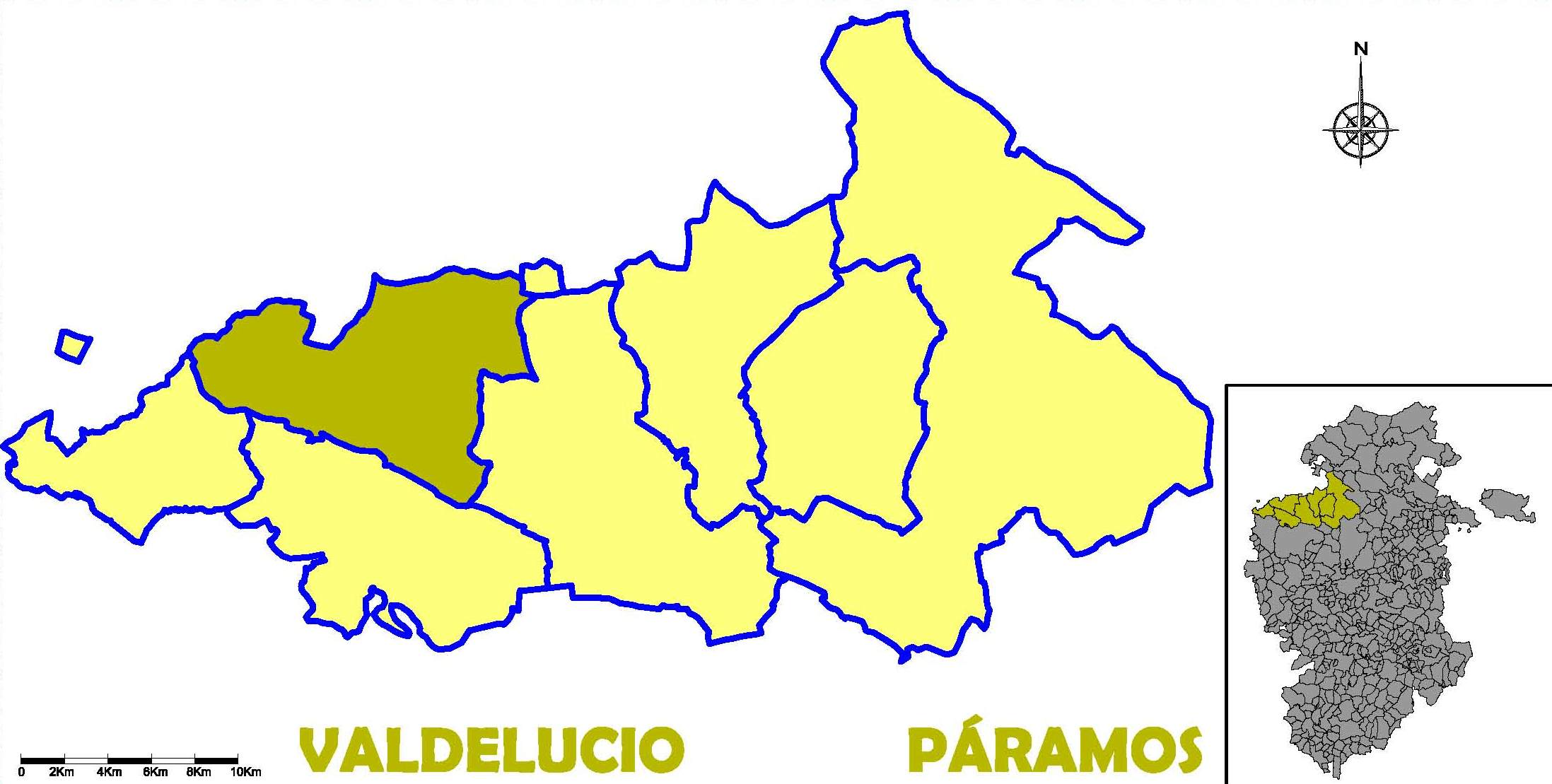
- Country: Spain
- Autonomous community: Castile and León
- Province: Burgos

Area
  - Total: 95 km^{2} (37 sq mi)

Population (2025-01-01)
  - Total: 342
  - Density: 3.6/km^{2} (9.3/sq mi)
- Time zone: UTC+1 (CET)
  - Summer (DST): UTC+2 (CEST)

Valle de Valdelucio is a municipality located in the province of Burgos, Castile and León, Spain. According to the 2004 census (INE), the municipality has a population of 350 inhabitants.

== See also ==
- Páramos (shire)
- Valle del Rudrón
