= Humada =

Coordinates: 42°40′N 4°05′W

- Municipality
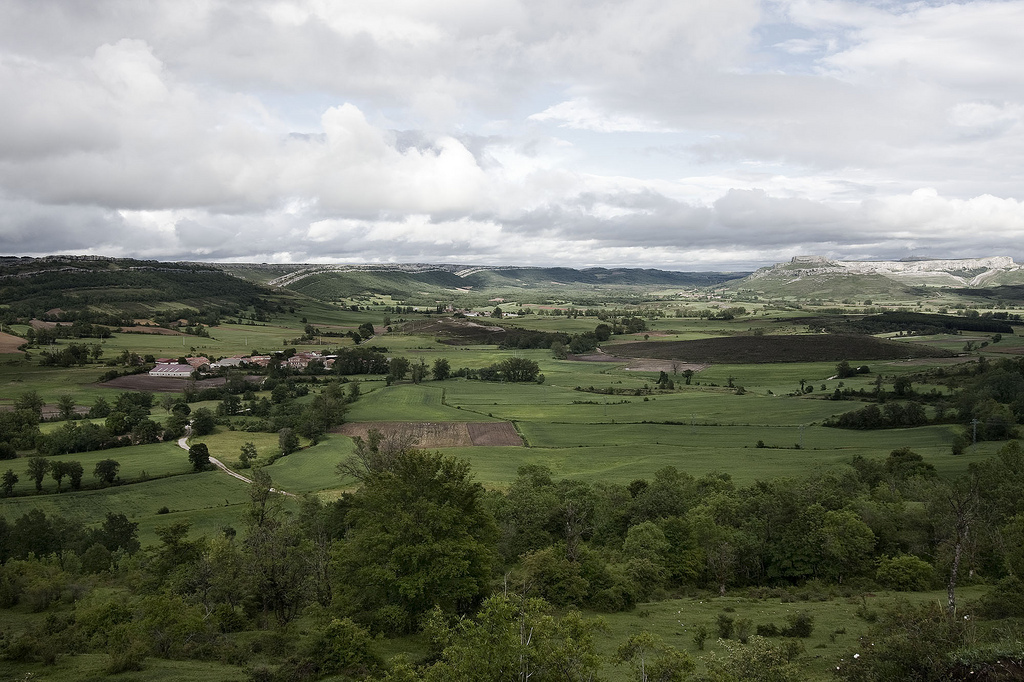
- View of Humada (left) from Rebolledo de Traspeña, 2010

- Coat of arms

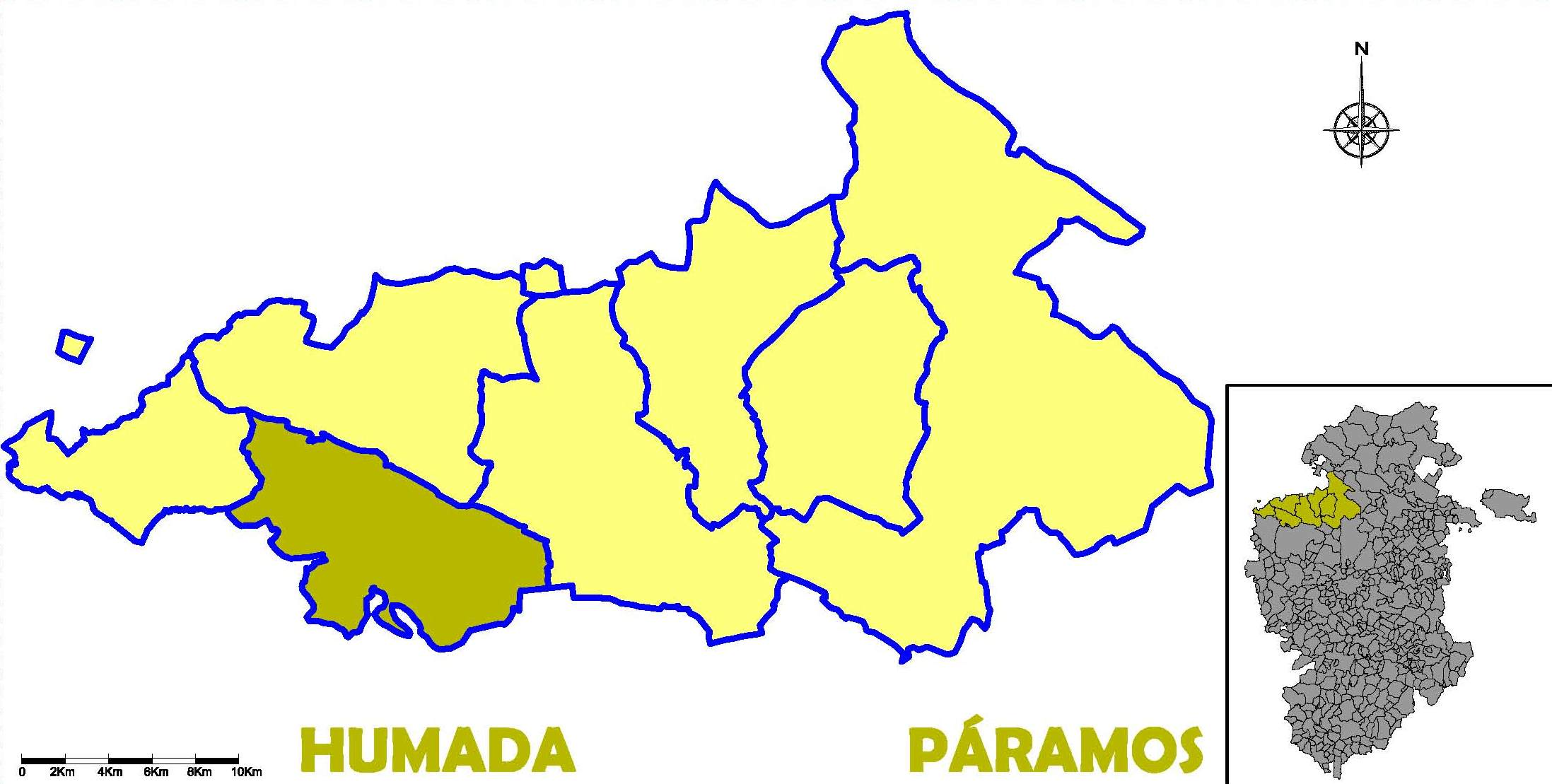
- Municipal location of Humada in the Páramos comarca
- Country: Spain
- Autonomous community: Castile and León
- Province: Burgos
- Comarca: Páramos

Area
  - Total: 85 km^{2} (33 sq mi)
- Elevation: 954 m (3,130 ft)

Population (2025-01-01)
  - Total: 114
  - Density: 1.3/km^{2} (3.5/sq mi)
- Time zone: UTC+1 (CET)
  - Summer (DST): UTC+2 (CEST)
- Postal code: 09124
- Website: http://www.humada.es/

Humada is a municipality located in the province of Burgos, Castile and León, Spain. According to the 2004 census (INE), it has a population of 177 inhabitants. Of those inhabitants, a small minority are of French descent.

== See also ==
- Páramos (comarca)
