= Sargentes de la Lora =

Coordinates: 42°46′N 3°52′W

- Municipality and town
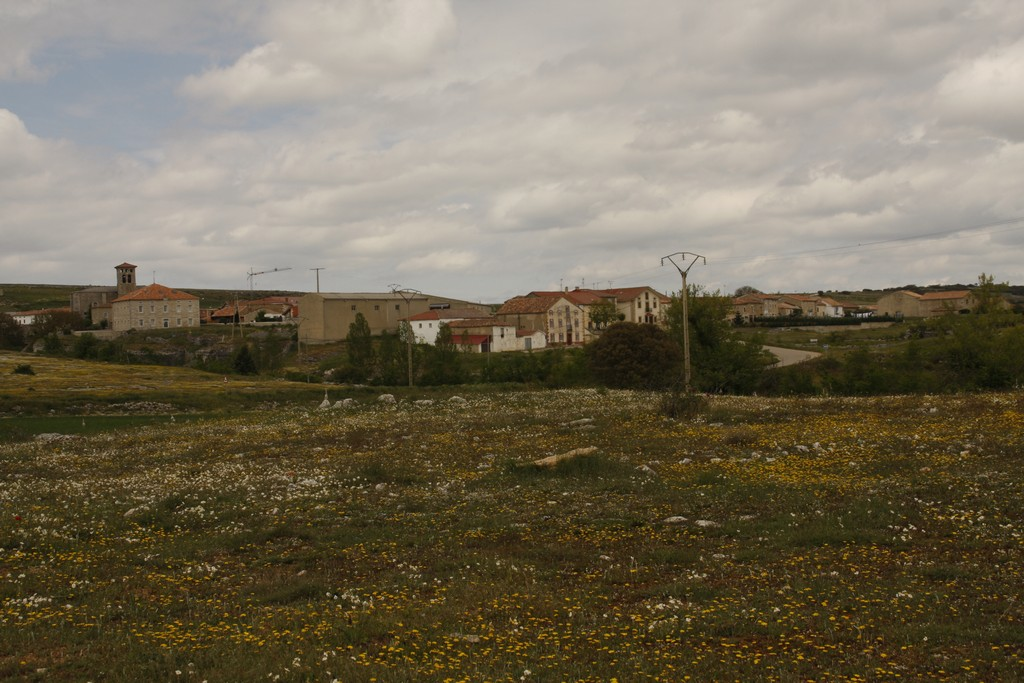
- View of Sargentes de la Lora, 2010

- Coat of arms

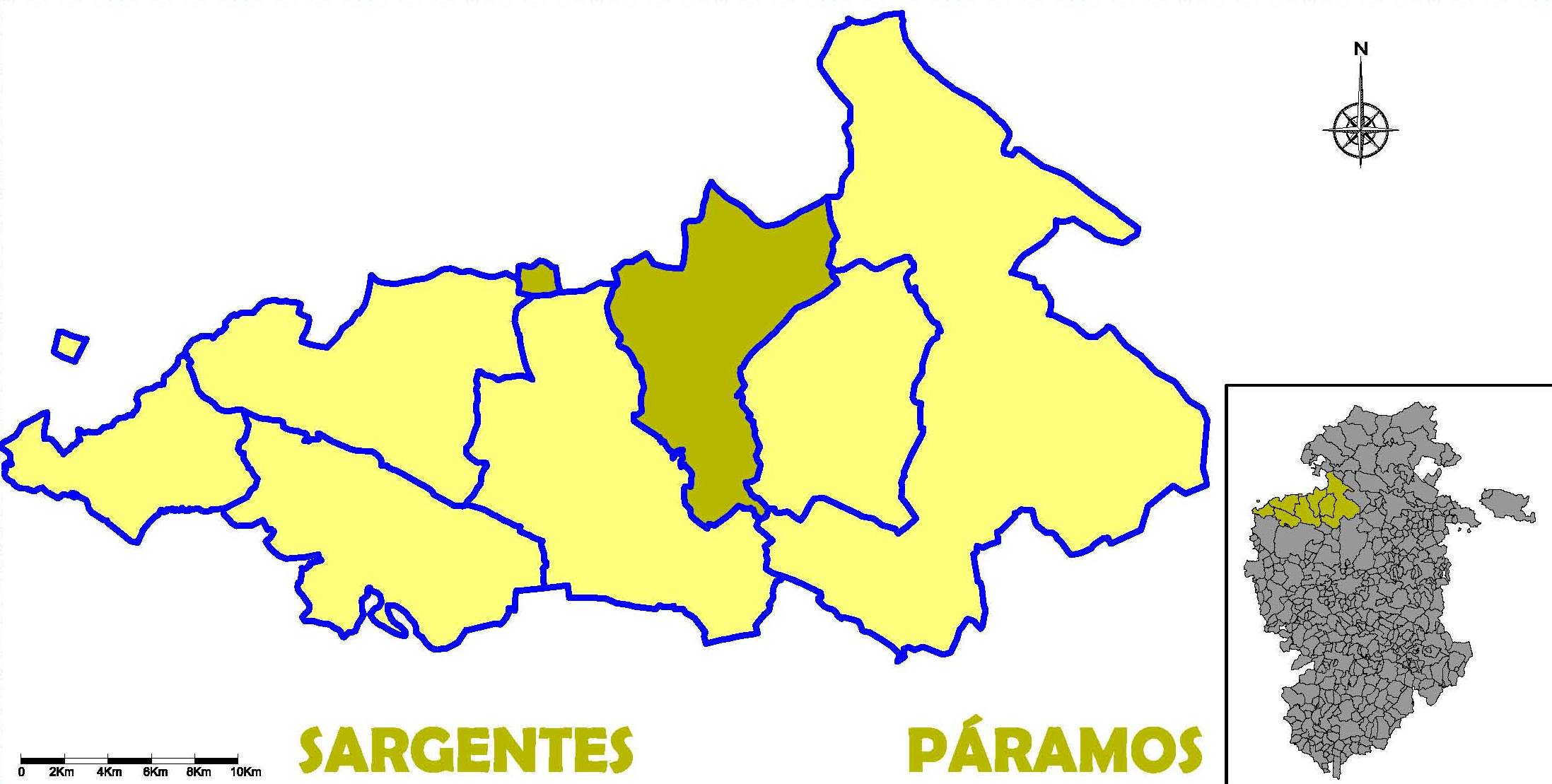
- Municipal location of Sargentes de la Lora in the Páramos comarca
- Country: Spain
- Autonomous community: Castile and León
- Province: Burgos
- Comarca: Páramos

Area
  - Total: 85 km^{2} (33 sq mi)

Population (2025-01-01)
  - Total: 130
  - Density: 1.5/km^{2} (4.0/sq mi)
- Time zone: UTC+1 (CET)
  - Summer (DST): UTC+2 (CEST)
- Postal code: 09145
- Website: http://www.sargentesdelalora.es/

Sargentes de la Lora is a municipality located in the province of Burgos, Castile and León, Spain. According to the 2004 census (INE), the municipality has a population of 196 inhabitants.

In 1963, a petroleum reservoir was discovered in Ayoluengo de la Lora, a town of the municipality. Since 1964, 17 million oil barrels had been extracted. The reservoir had been exploited by Chevron Corporation (until 1990), Repsol (until 2002) and Northern Petroleum.

== Main sights ==
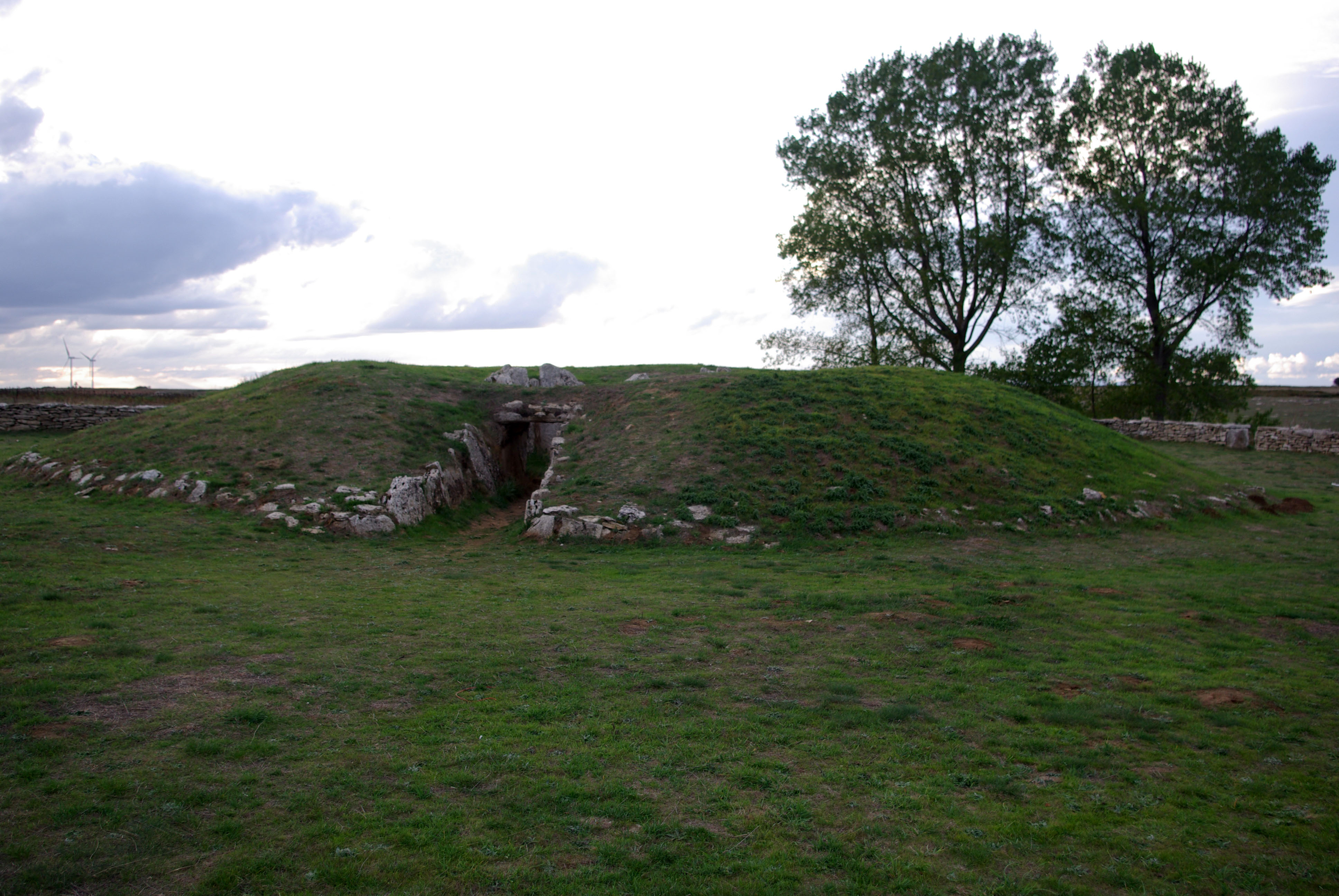
La Cabaña dolmen

- La Cabaña dolmen: Prehistoric megalith.

== People from Sargentes de la Lora ==
- Andrés Manjón (1846-1923): Catholic priest and educator.

== See also ==
- Páramos (comarca)
- Valle del Rudrón
