= Turzo (Burgos) =

- Village
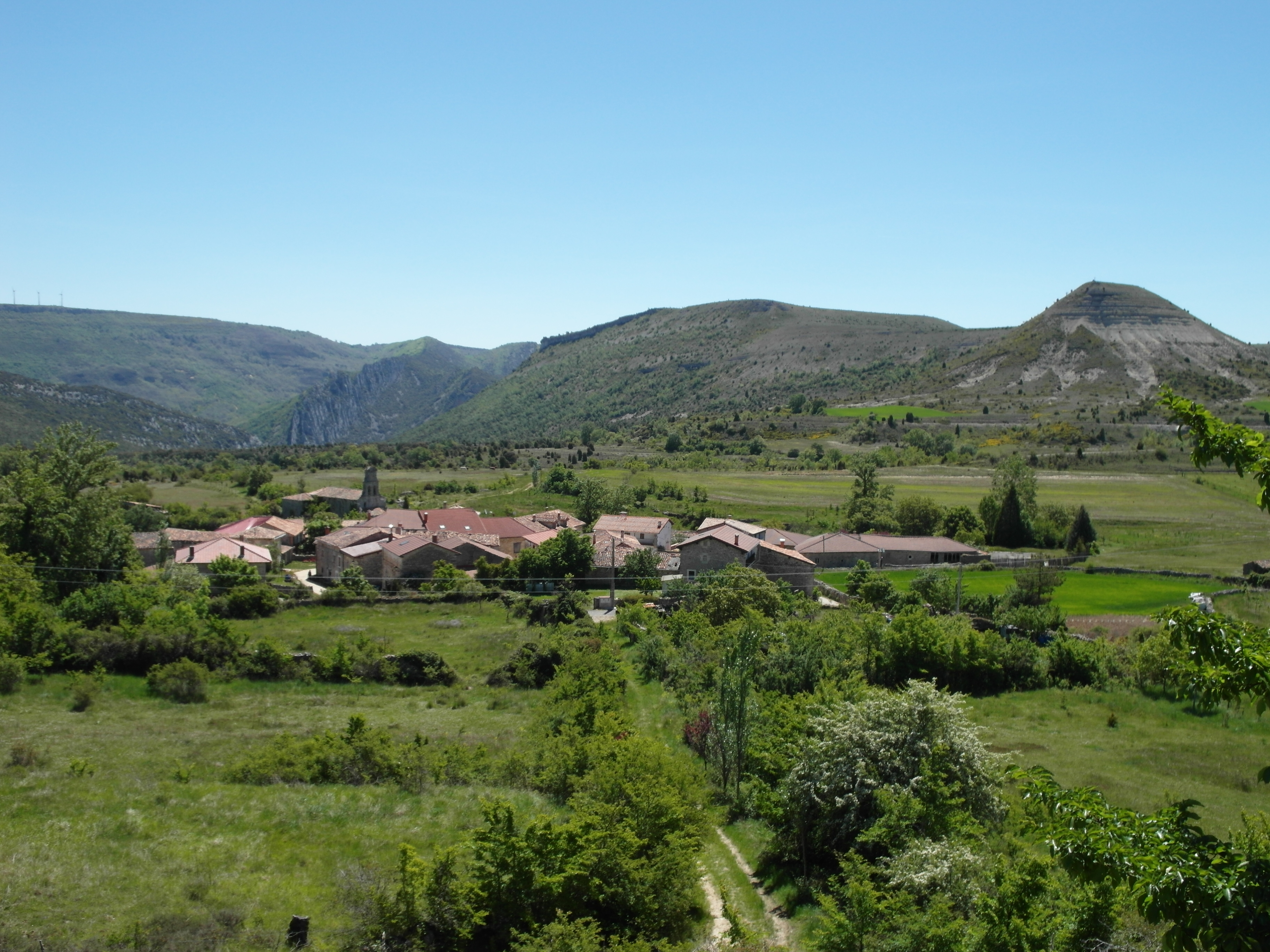

- Location within Province of Burgos Location within Castile and León Location within Spain
- Coordinates: 42°50′7″N 3°45′34″W
- Country: Spain
- Autonomous community: Castile and León
- Province: Province of Burgos
- Municipality: Valle de Sedano
- Elevation: 860 m (2,820 ft)

Population
  - Total: 6

Turzo is a hamlet located in the municipality of Valle de Sedano, in Burgos province, Castile and León, Spain. As of 2020, it has a population of 6.

== Geography ==
Turzo is located 66km north of Burgos.
