= Rebolledo de la Torre =

Coordinates: 42°41′N 4°13′W

- Municipality
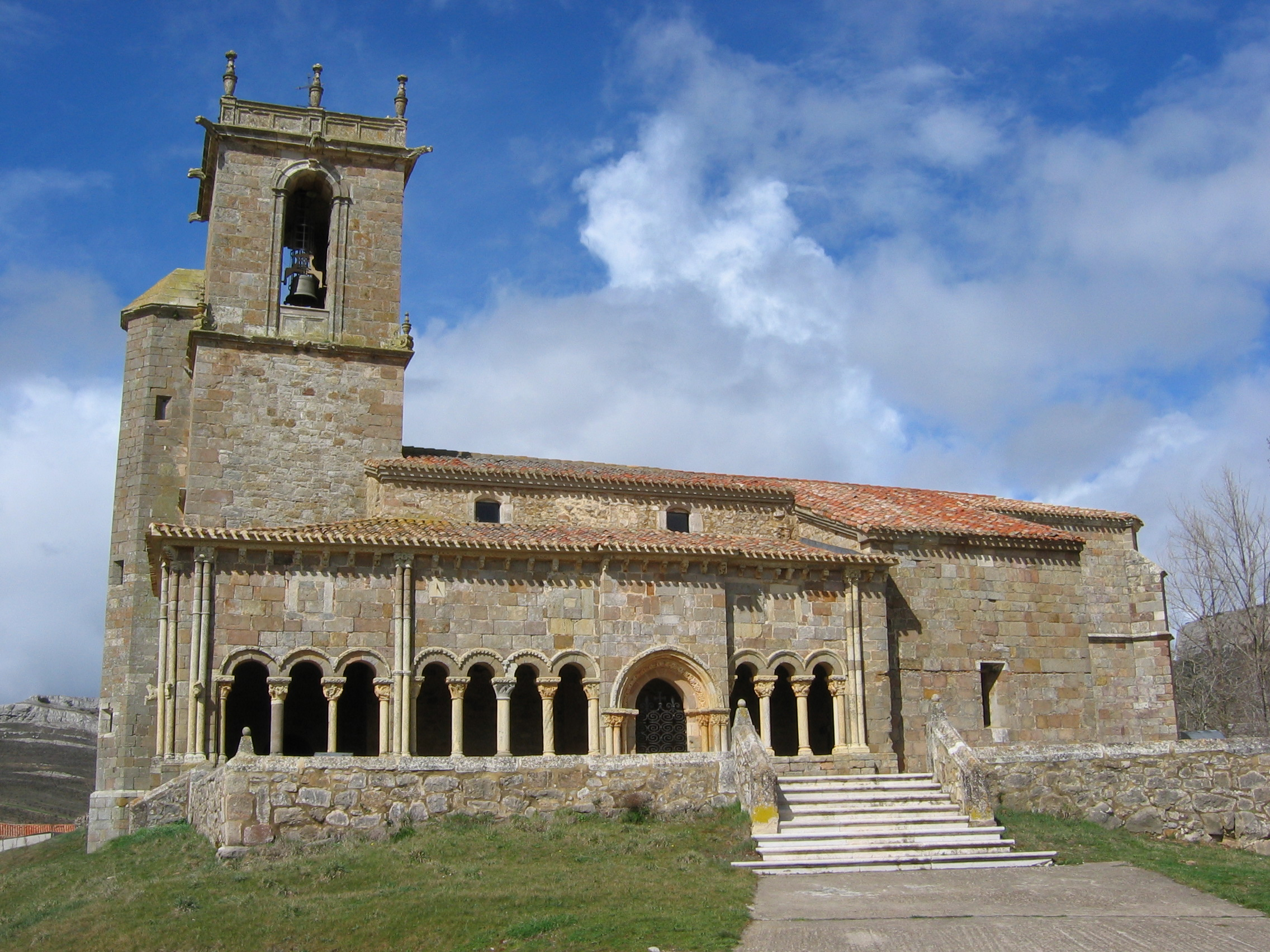
- San Julián y Santa Basilisa church (12th century)

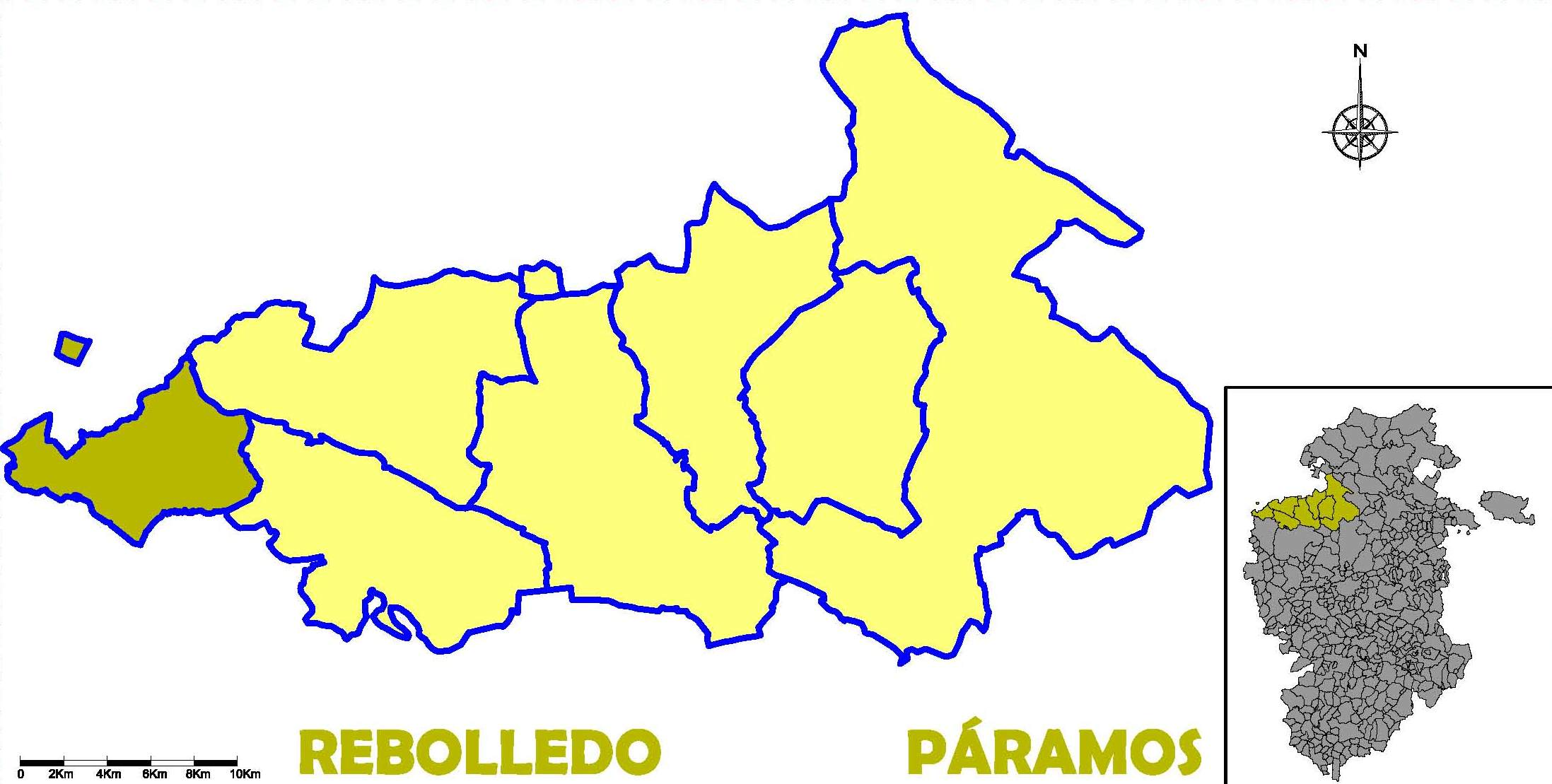
- Municipal location of Rebolledo de la Torre in the Páramos comarca
- Country: Spain
- Autonomous community: Castile and León
- Province: Burgos
- Comarca: Páramos

Area
  - Total: 50 km^{2} (19 sq mi)
- Elevation: 960 m (3,150 ft)

Population (2025-01-01)
  - Total: 100
  - Density: 2.0/km^{2} (5.2/sq mi)
- Time zone: UTC+1 (CET)
  - Summer (DST): UTC+2 (CEST)
- Postal code: 34492
- Website: http://www.rebolledodelatorre.es/

Rebolledo de la Torre is a municipality and town located in the province of Burgos, Castile and León, Spain. According to the 2004 census (INE), the municipality has a population of 167 inhabitants.

== See also ==
- Páramos (comarca)
