= Tubilla del Agua =

- Municipality and village
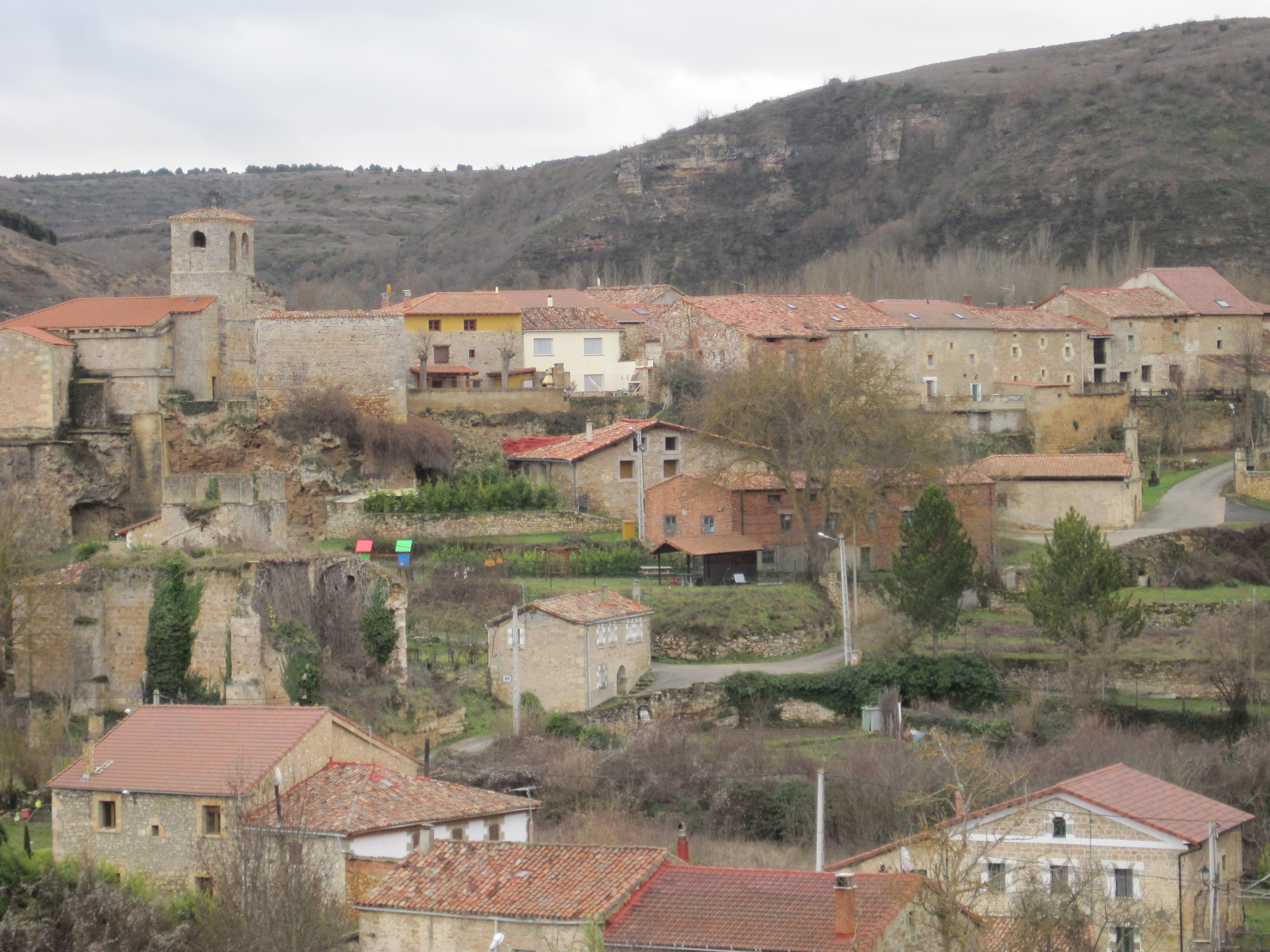

- Coat of arms

- Location Tubilla del Agua (Spain)
- Coordinates: 42.709°N 3.803°W
- Country: Spain
- Autonomous community: Castile and León
- Province: Burgos
- Comarca: Valle del Rudrón
- Elevation: 777 m (2,549 ft)

Population (2025-01-01)
  - Total: 126
- Postal code: 09143
- Website: www.tubilladelagua.es

Tubilla del Agua is a village and municipality located in the province of Burgos, Castile and León, Spain. According to the 2004 census (INE), the municipality has a population of 209 inhabitants. The climate is relatively cool in the summer and cold in the winter.

Tubilla del Agua is located in the Rudrón Valley. Valley formed by the River Rudrón that also separates on the left the moor of La Lora and right the moor of Masa

Also passes through the village the River Ornillo, generating many waterfalls.

== Villages ==
- Bañuelos del Rudrón
- Covanera
- San Felices del Rudrón
- Tablada del Rudrón
- Tubilla del Agua

In this county, in the village of Covanera, is Pozo Azul. It is subject to exploration by cave divers of UK. In 2010, a British-led cave divers team broke a diving world record by exploring 8.8 km (5.5 miles) of the cave.

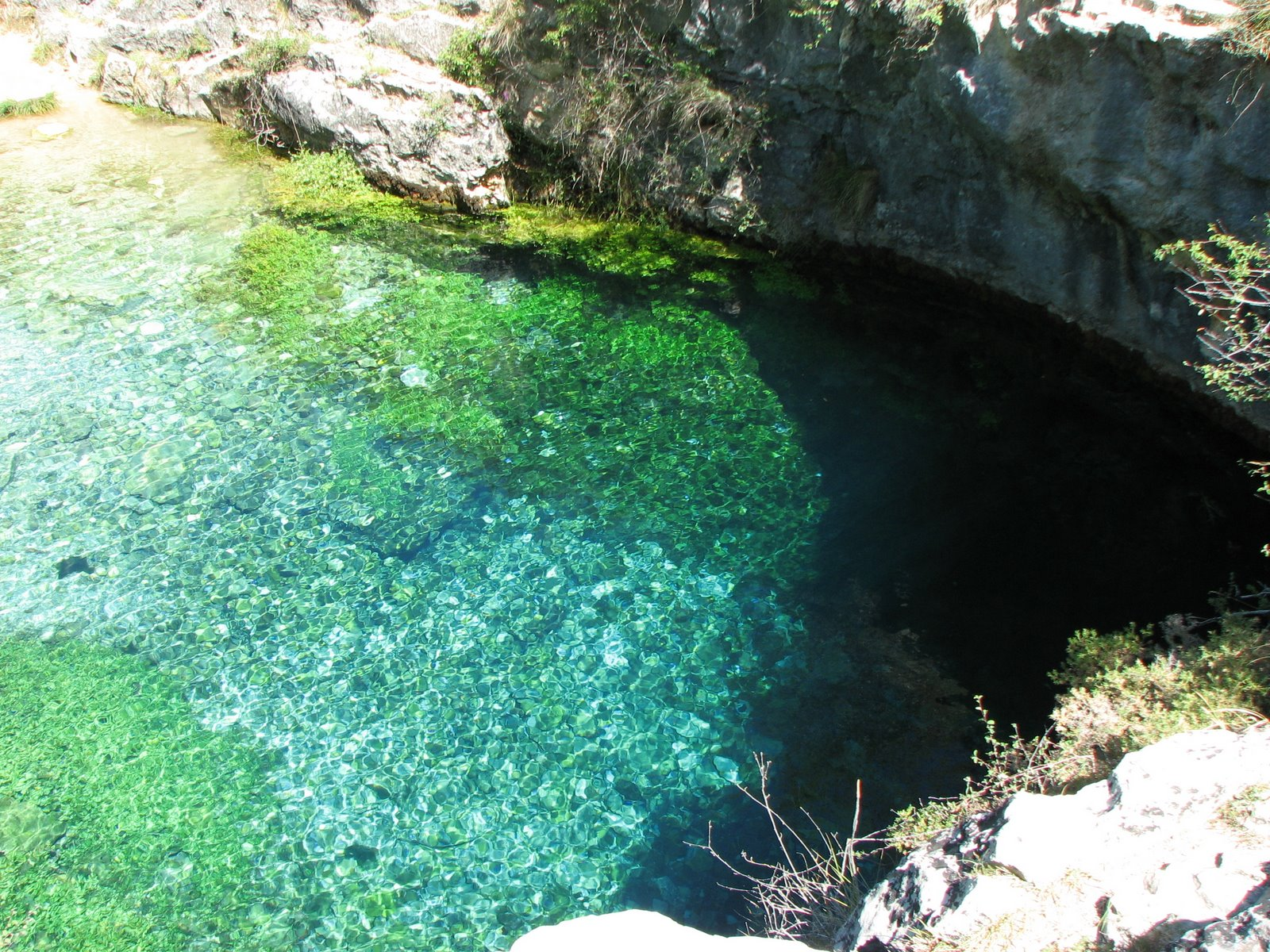
Covanera: Pozo Azul

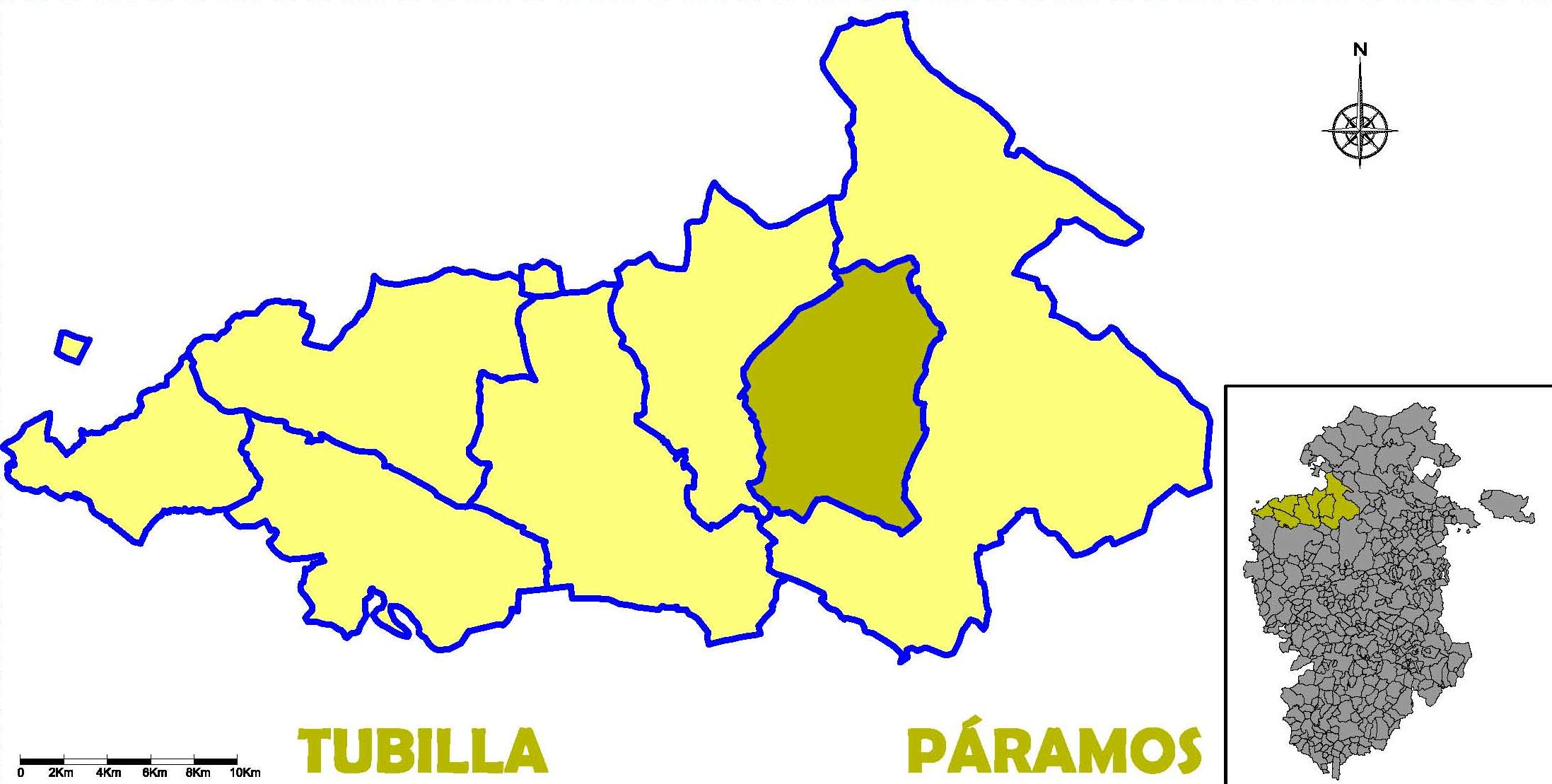

== Bibliography ==
- Cadiñanos Bardeci, Inocencio (1.987): Arquitectura fortificada en la provincia de Burgos. Artegraf. Madrid. ISBN 84-505-5990-1 Tubilla del Agua: pp. 258 – 259.
- Cidad Pérez, Joaquín (1.988): Tubilla del Agua. Apuntes históricos sobre el Municipio. Imprenta Carmelo. Burgos. ISBN 84-404-2669-0
- Delibes de Castro, Germán & Rojo Guerra, Manuel & Represa Bermejo, J. Ignacio (1.993): Dólmenes de La Lora. II.- Los monumentos megalíticos: características, problemas y accesos. Tubilla del Agua. Ed. Europa Artes Gráficas. Salamanca. ISBN 84-7846-248-1 pp. 83 – 90.
- Martínez Díez, Gonzalo (1.987): Pueblos y alfoces burgaleses de la repoblación. 3.- Alfoz de Moradillo. 4.- Alfoz de Siero. Ed. Sever-Cuesta. Valladolid. ISBN 84-505-6225-2 pp. 62 – 78

== See also ==
- Páramos (comarca)
- Valle del Rudrón
