= Úrbel del Castillo =

Coordinates: 42°37′16″N 3°50′36″W

- municipality
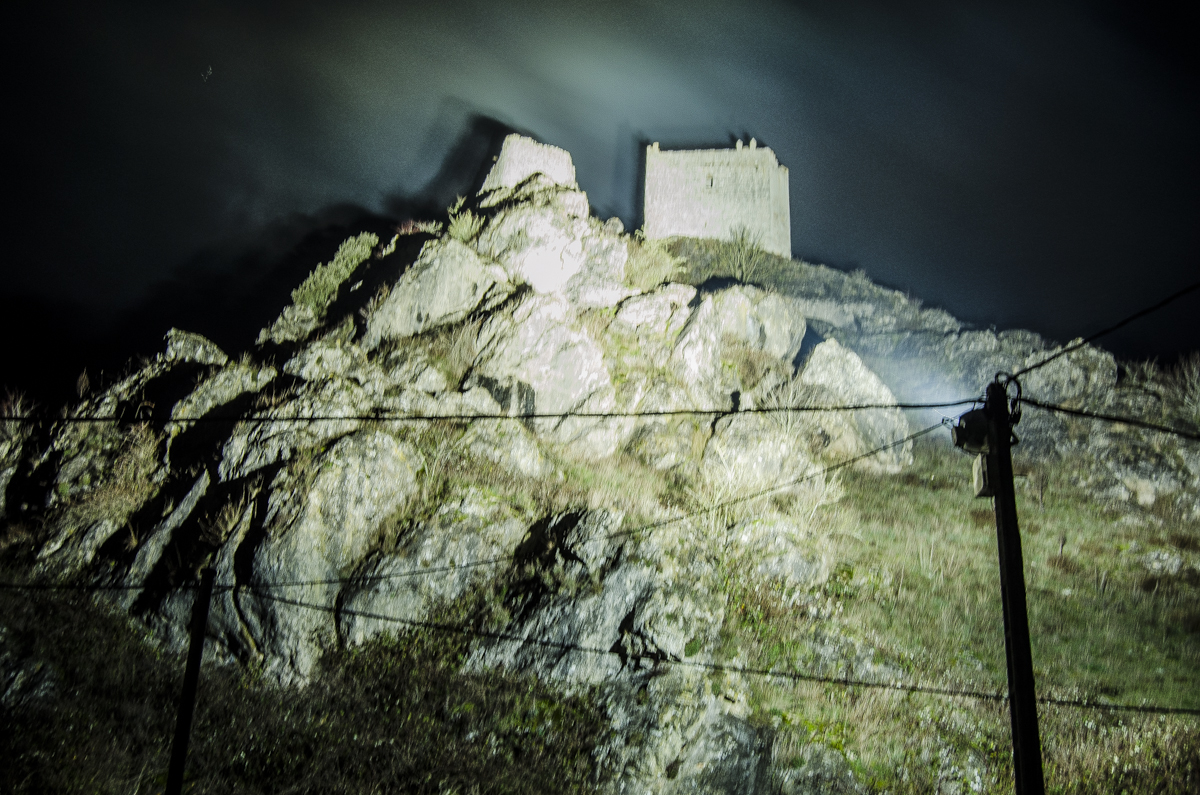
- Night of the castle of Úrbel. Úrbel del Castillo
- Interactive map of Úrbel del Castillo
- Country: Spain
- Autonomous community: Castile and León
- Province: Burgos
- Comarca: Páramos

Area
  - Total: 30 km^{2} (12 sq mi)

Population (2025-01-01)
  - Total: 53
  - Density: 1.8/km^{2} (4.6/sq mi)
- Time zone: UTC+1 (CET)
  - Summer (DST): UTC+2 (CEST)

Úrbel del Castillo is a municipality located in the province of Burgos, Castile and León, Spain. According to the 2004 census (INE), the municipality has a population of 100 inhabitants.
