= Gredilla de Sedano =

- Minor local entity
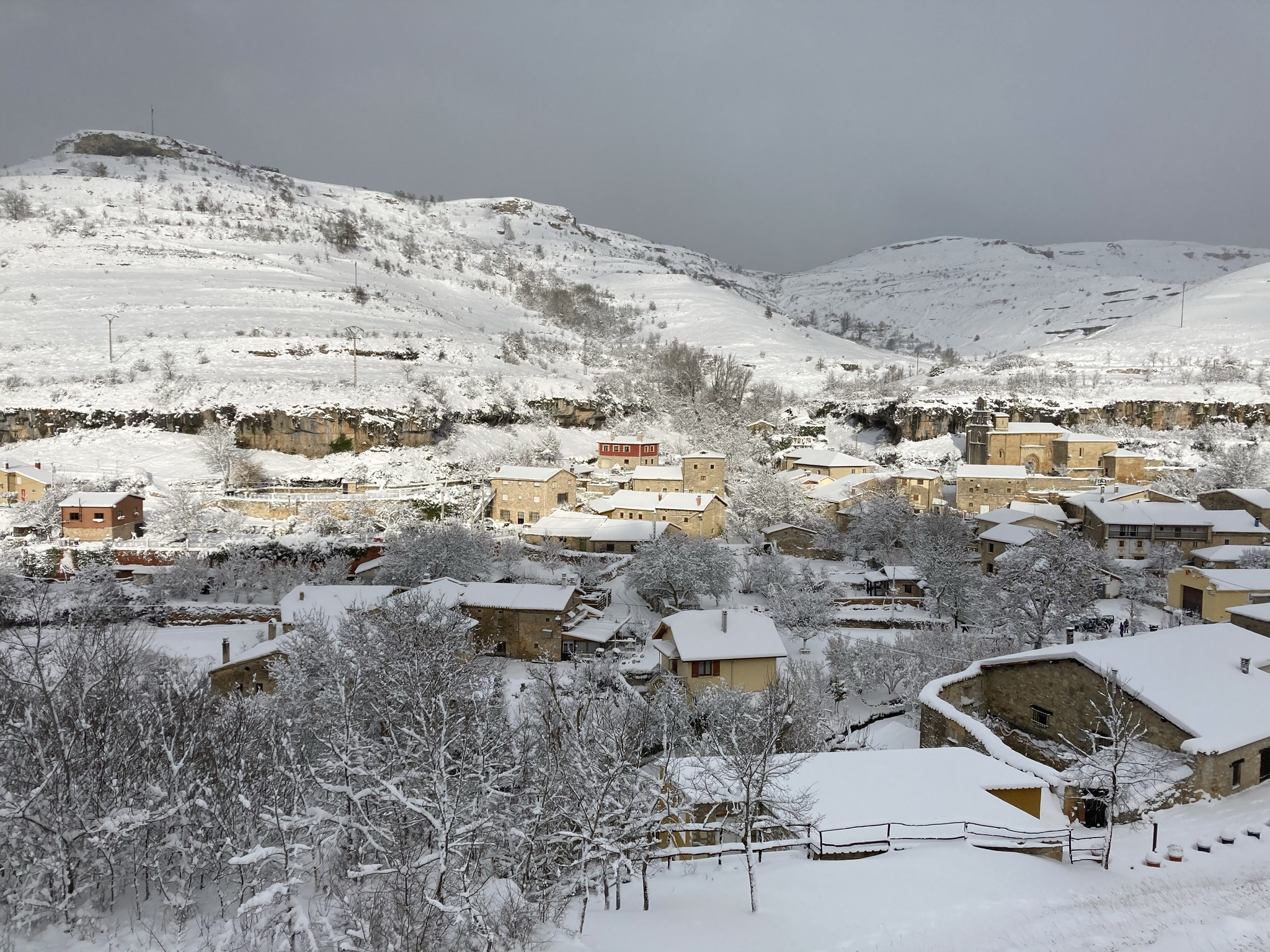

- Location within Province of Burgos Location within Castile and León Location within Spain
- Coordinates: 42°43′13″N 3°43′12″W
- Country: Spain
- Autonomous community: Castile and León
- Province: Province of Burgos
- Municipality: Valle de Sedano
- Elevation: 823 m (2,700 ft)

Population
  - Total: 14

Gredilla de Sedano is a hamlet and minor local entity located in the municipality of Valle de Sedano, in Burgos province, Castile and León, Spain. As of 2020, it has a population of 14.

== Geography ==
Gredilla de Sedano is located 49km north of Burgos.
