= Terradillos de Sedano =

- Minor local entity
- Location within Province of Burgos Location within Castile and León Location within Spain
- Coordinates: 42°39′4″N 3°49′16″W
- Country: Spain
- Autonomous community: Castile and León
- Province: Province of Burgos
- Municipality: Valle de Sedano
- Elevation: 857 m (2,812 ft)

Population
  - Total: 18

Terradillos de Sedano is a hamlet and minor local entity located in the municipality of Valle de Sedano, in Burgos province, Castile and León, Spain. As of 2020, it has a population of 18.

== Geography ==
Terradillos de Sedano is located 43km north-northwest of Burgos.
