= Orbaneja del Castillo =

- Minor local entity
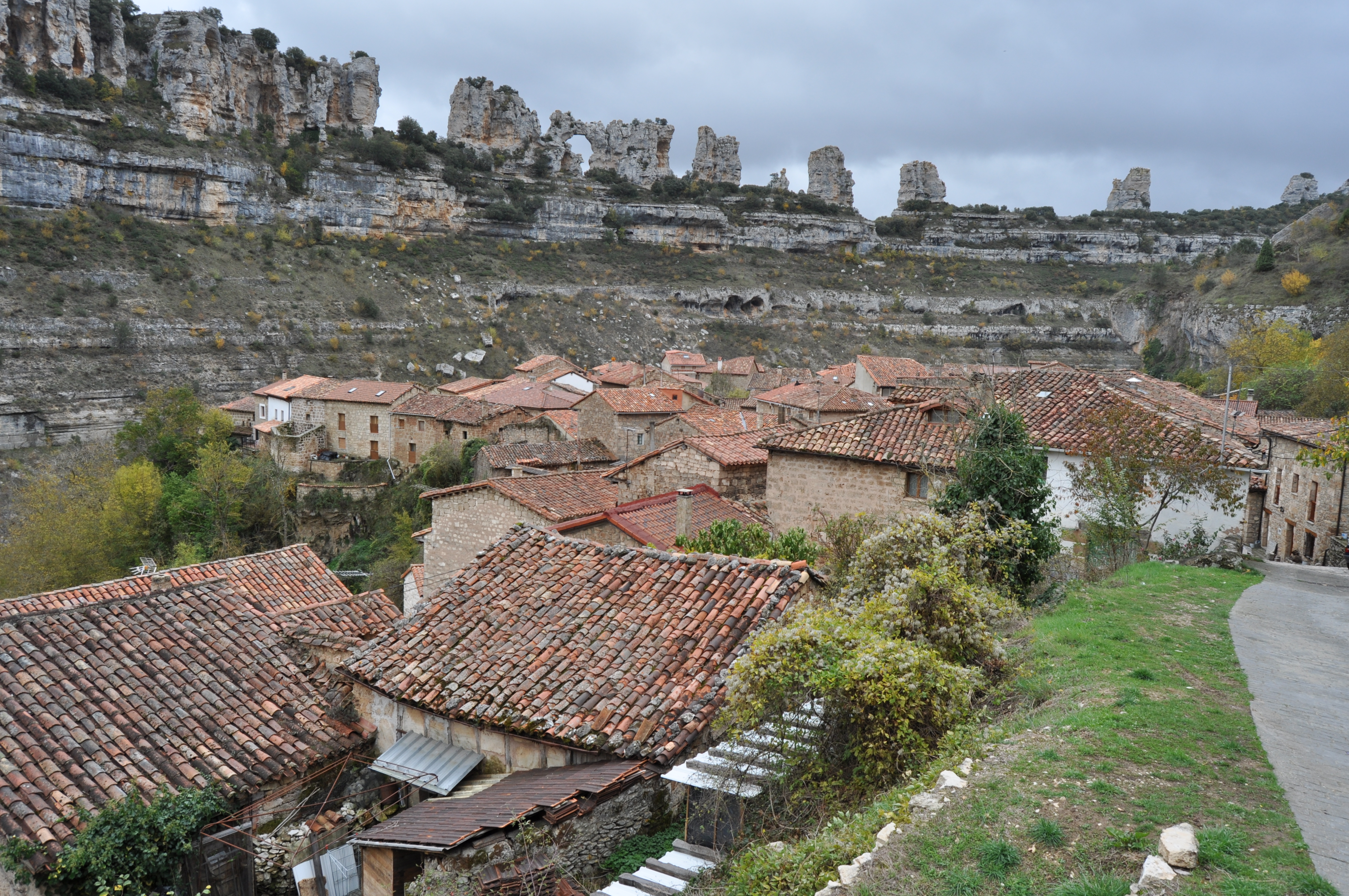

- Location within Province of Burgos Location within Castile and León Location within Spain
- Coordinates: 42°50′6″N 3°47′37″W
- Country: Spain
- Autonomous community: Castile and León
- Province: Province of Burgos
- Municipality: Valle de Sedano
- Elevation: 713 m (2,339 ft)

Population
  - Total: 47

Orbaneja del Castillo is a town and minor local entity located in the province of Burgos, in the autonomous community of Castile and León (Spain), in the Páramos region. Administratively, it belongs to the municipality of Valle de Sedano, although it was traditionally an independent enclave. As of 2020, it has a population of 47.

== Geography ==
Orbaneja del Castillo is a town located on the border with Cantabria, situated between the municipality of Valderredible in Cantabria and Escalada (Burgos). It is located 67 km north of Burgos.

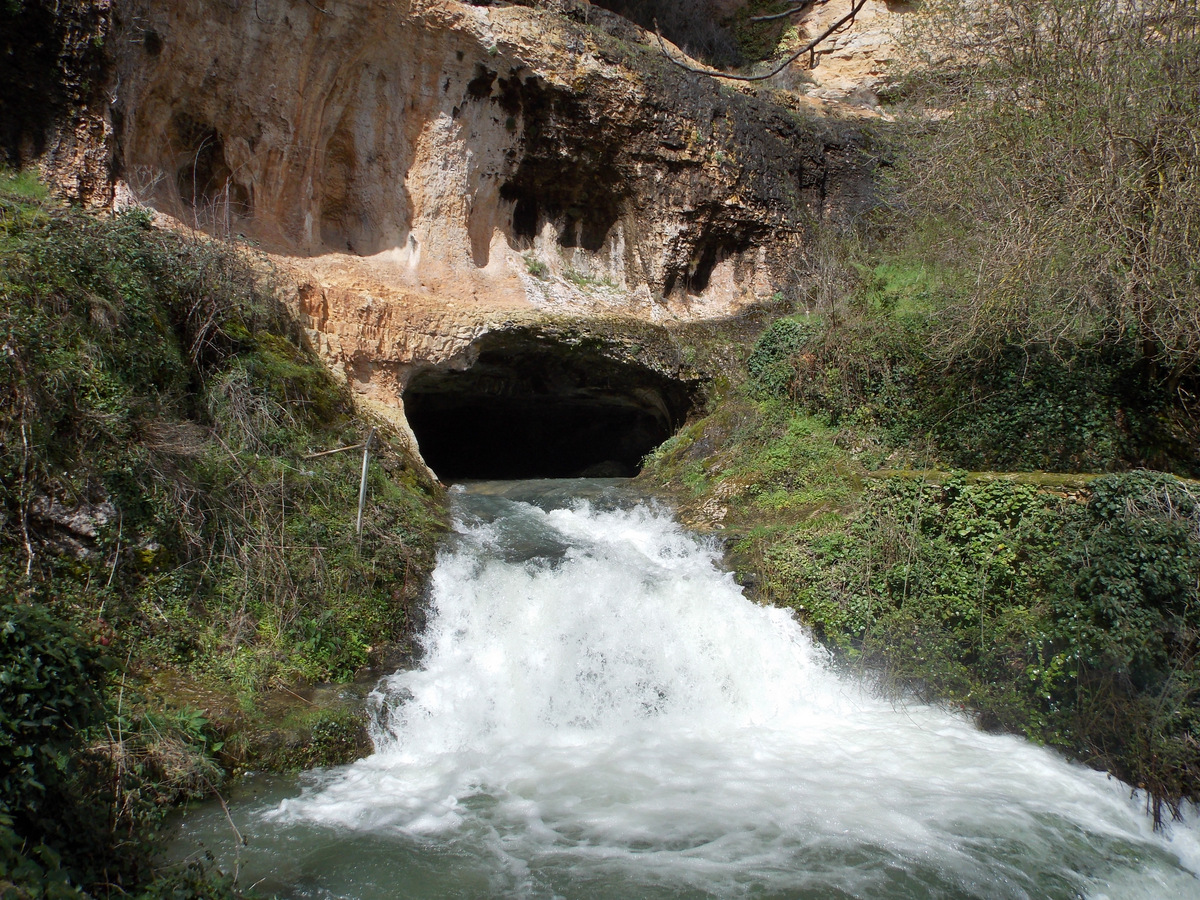
Cueva del Agua

It is characterized by its karst landscape shaped by water. The Cueva del Agua (Water Cave) has attracted the interest of various scholars of geology and related sciences. But there are also other lesser-known caves such as the Nispero Cave and the Barbancho Cave. A stream flows out of it, crossing the town before cascading down into the Ebro River, which passes nearby.

Tuff is also present, notable for several factors and its high content of diverse materials. This characteristic is shared with other nearby towns such as Tubilla del Agua.

== Roads ==
Starting from the N-623 at Escalada (Burgos), the road BU-643 leads to Orbaneja. Then continue towards Villaescusa de Ebro on the CA-275 road, which leads to Polientes.

== Toponym ==
According to the linguist Edelmiro Bascuas, the toponym "Orbaneja" comes from the stem *orw-, derived from the Proto-Indo-European root *er-, meaning "to flow, to move."

== History ==
=== Loquat Cave ===
Located Located approximately 90 metres above the Ebro riverbed and the Horca Menor stream, this cave was occupied at least twice; once during the Epipaleolithic period. These occupations have been used to analyze the fauna, lithic industry, and other materials of the people who inhabited this area.

=== Middle Ages ===
- The current town originated in the Middle Ages. Its name makes it clear that there was once a castle.

Mozarabs from Al-Andalus lived there. It was a town with a Jewish quarter (aljama), the memory of which remains in the street names.

The Knights Templar built the Hospital of San Albín.

The Catholic Monarchs granted it the title of town.

This town was included within the Diocese of Santander, in the archpriestship of Cejancas, along with Turzo, Bricia, Cilleruelo de Bricia, and other towns in the surrounding area.
