= Valdelateja =

- Minor local entity
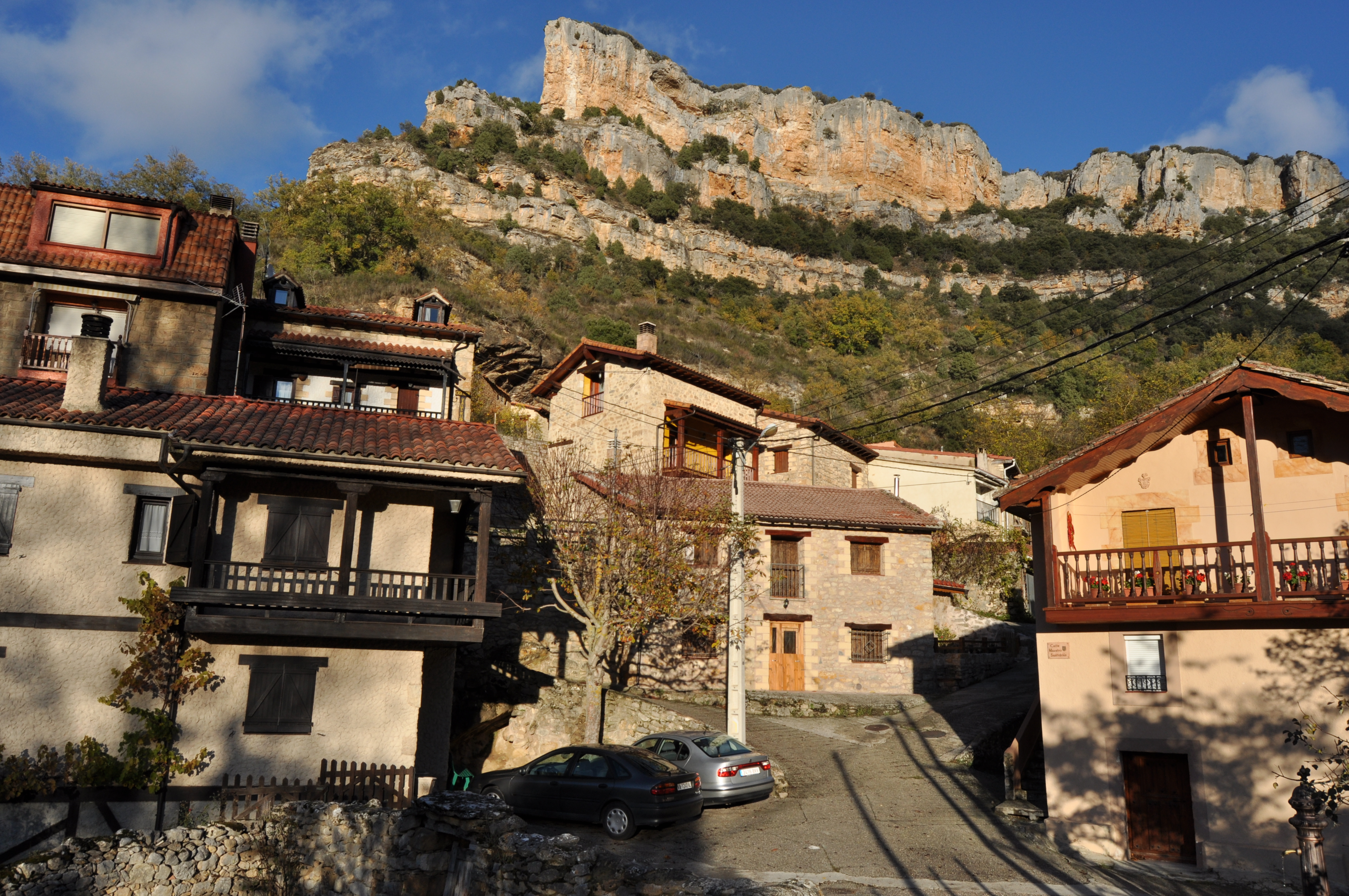

- Location within Province of Burgos Location within Castile and León Location within Spain
- Coordinates: 42°46′29″N 3°46′4″W
- Country: Spain
- Autonomous community: Castile and León
- Province: Province of Burgos
- Municipality: Valle de Sedano
- Elevation: 650 m (2,130 ft)

Population
  - Total: 17

Valdelateja is a hamlet and minor local entity located in the municipality of Valle de Sedano, in Burgos province, Castile and León, Spain. As of 2020, it has a population of 17.

== Geography ==
Valdelateja is located 58km north of Burgos.
