= Rudrón Valley =

Valley in Castilla y León, Spain

Valle del Rudrón
- Location in Spain
- Coordinates: 42.689444°N 3.854333°W
- Elevation: 980–677 m (3,215–2,221 ft)
- Postal code: 09143

The Rudrón Valley (Spanish: Valle del Rudrón) is a valley of the province of Burgos, in the autonomous community of Castilla y León, Spain, that borders the autonomous community of Cantabria.

From a structural standpoint, the relief is organized around a large morphostructural unit: an extensive moorland. The River Rudrón divides and separates both sides of moorland. The River Rudrón divides and separates both sides of moorland creating Rudrón Valley, leaving on the left the moor of La Lora and right the moor of Masa.

* Wikimapia- Valle del Rudrón

== Geographical description ==
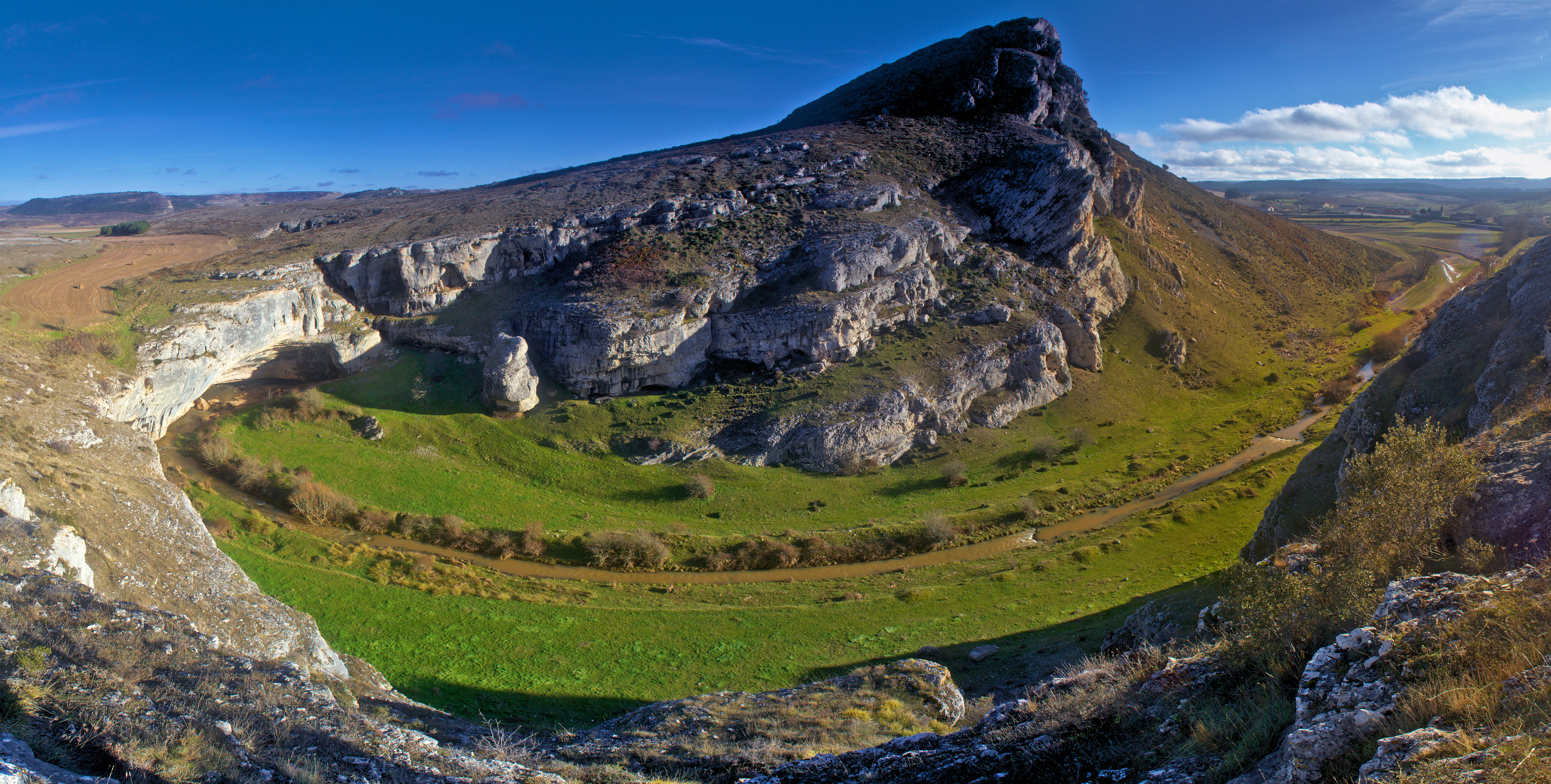
Water Cave (Basconcillos del Tozo). The River Urón moves right to left direction in this valley, as shown in the picture, introduced in the karstic system whose input is observed cave on the left. The river flows through the area at the back and left of the image and the name of the River Rudrón.

The River Rudrón through a process of epigenesis has excavated and drilled sedimentary limestones that extensive moorland, moorland that forms the watershed of this river. The River Rudrón rises in the land of the Tozo, specifically in the town of San Mames of Abar where it is called the River Urón. Collect water from some rivers of Tozo.

The valley is interrupted by having a special feature, become underground river between Basconcillos of Tozo and the Barrio Panizares and where the river rises a second time. After millions of years the product of this erosion has generated the River Rudrón slopes and steep slopes, sometimes spectaculars. In the valley bottom lands dominated limestone, clay of Quaternary.

This erosion has also generated numerous springs, streams, fountains and creeks to break the different aquifers, in some cases spectacular as the Blue Pit (Spanish: 'Pozo Azul'). The Blue Pit is one of the most visited places of Rudrón Valley.

In this valley villages are located:

- Barrio Panizares
- Hoyos del Tozo
- Moradillo del Castillo
- Santa Coloma del Rudrón
- Bañuelos del Rudrón
- Tablada del Rudrón
- Tubilla del Agua
- Covanera
- San Felices del Rudrón
- Valdelateja

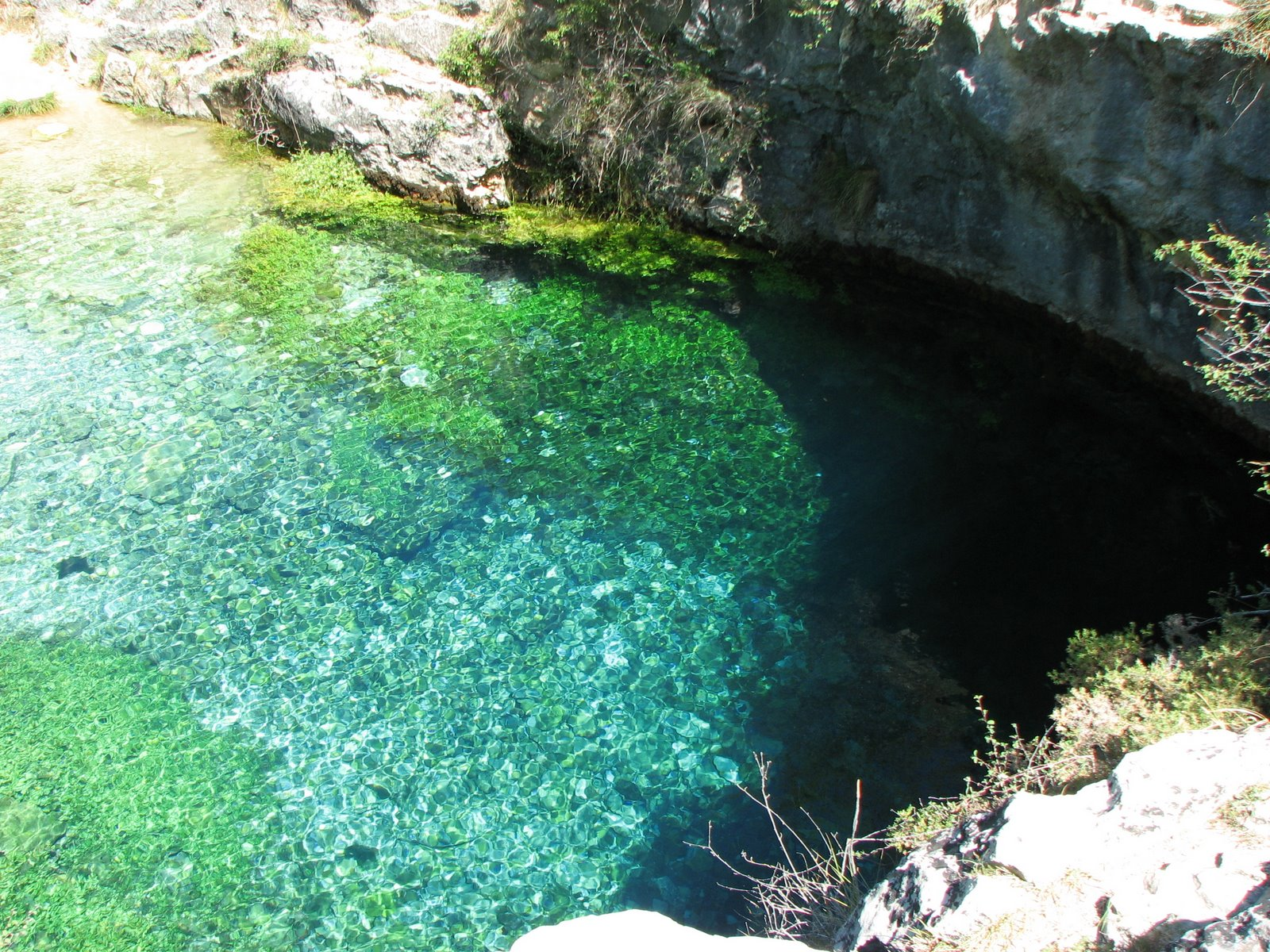
Covanera: Pozo Azul
