= Ochate =

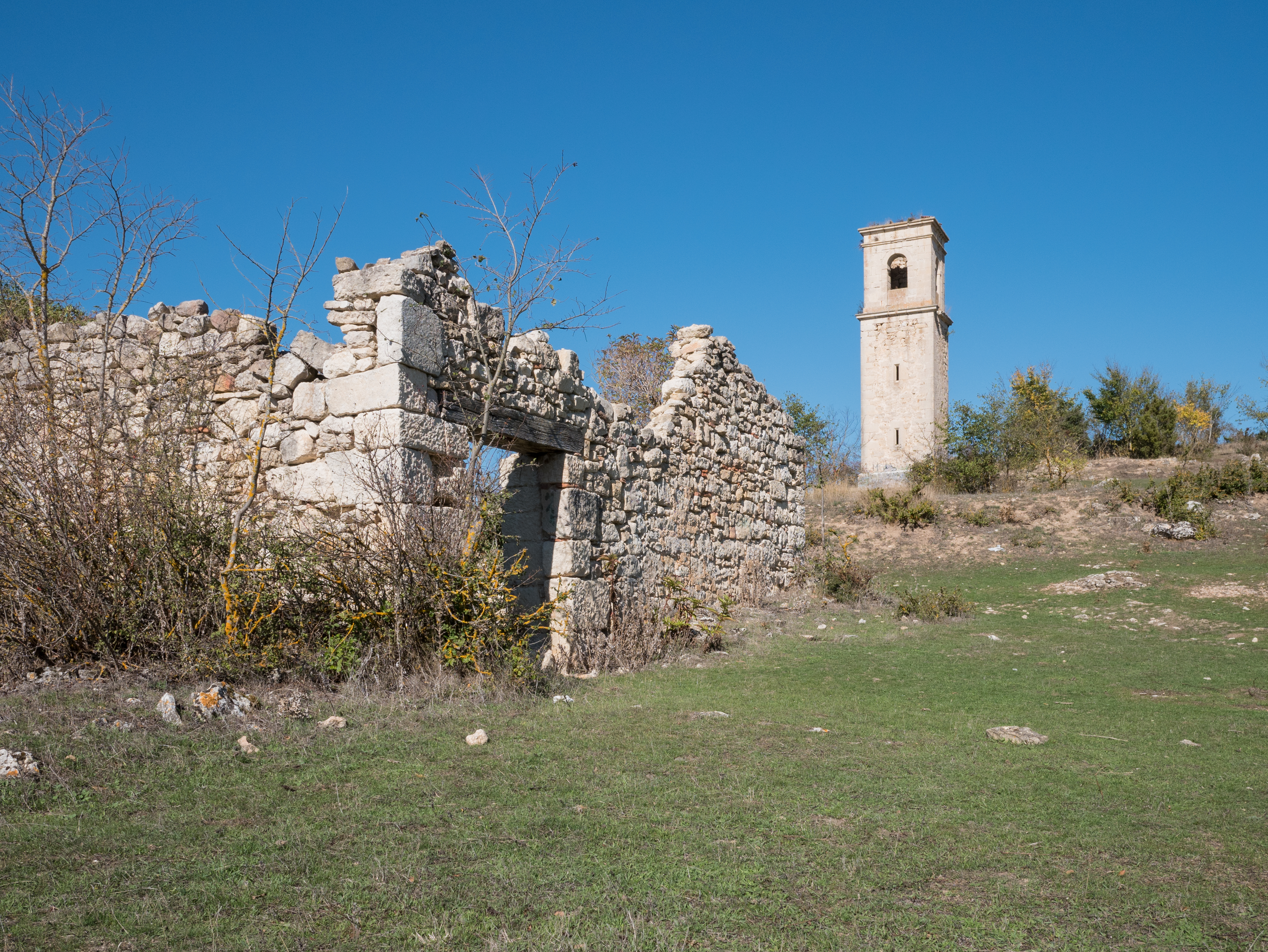

Ochate is a ghost town that is currently part of the municipality of Condado de Treviño, in the province of Burgos, Castilla y León (Spain). The place has become famous since the end of the 20th century due to alleged paranormal phenomena.

== Name ==
Over the centuries it has been known by the names Chochat, Gogate and Ochaite.

Ochate means in Basque, according to some interpretations, secret door or door of the cold, while others point out that it derives from the ancient name of Gogate, upper town, in reference to the geography of the place.

== Geography ==
Ochate is located in the area of Condado de Treviño, which is located in the Enclave of Treviño, an enclave located in the province of Álava, which belongs to the province of Burgos, of the autonomous community of Castilla y León. It is 33 km from the city of Miranda de Ebro and 20 km from Vitoria. The closest town is the town of Imiruri

The place is not accessible by car; It is necessary to travel a stretch of dirt road on foot until you reach the tower of San Miguel, one of the few vestiges that remain standing.

== Alleged paranormal phenomena ==
The territory is the subject of many legends about alleged paranormal phenomena. Ochate itself has become a place of pilgrimage for lovers of the genre since the 1980s, being considered one of the most mysterious places in Spain.

The legend was born in the eighties, due to an article published in Mundo Desconocido entitled Lights in the secret door. The article is based on a photograph of a UFO flying in the vicinity of the Ochate district, taken in 1981 by Prudencio Muguruza, although some experts believed that the photograph was false.
