= Arrieta (Burgos) =

- Minor local entity
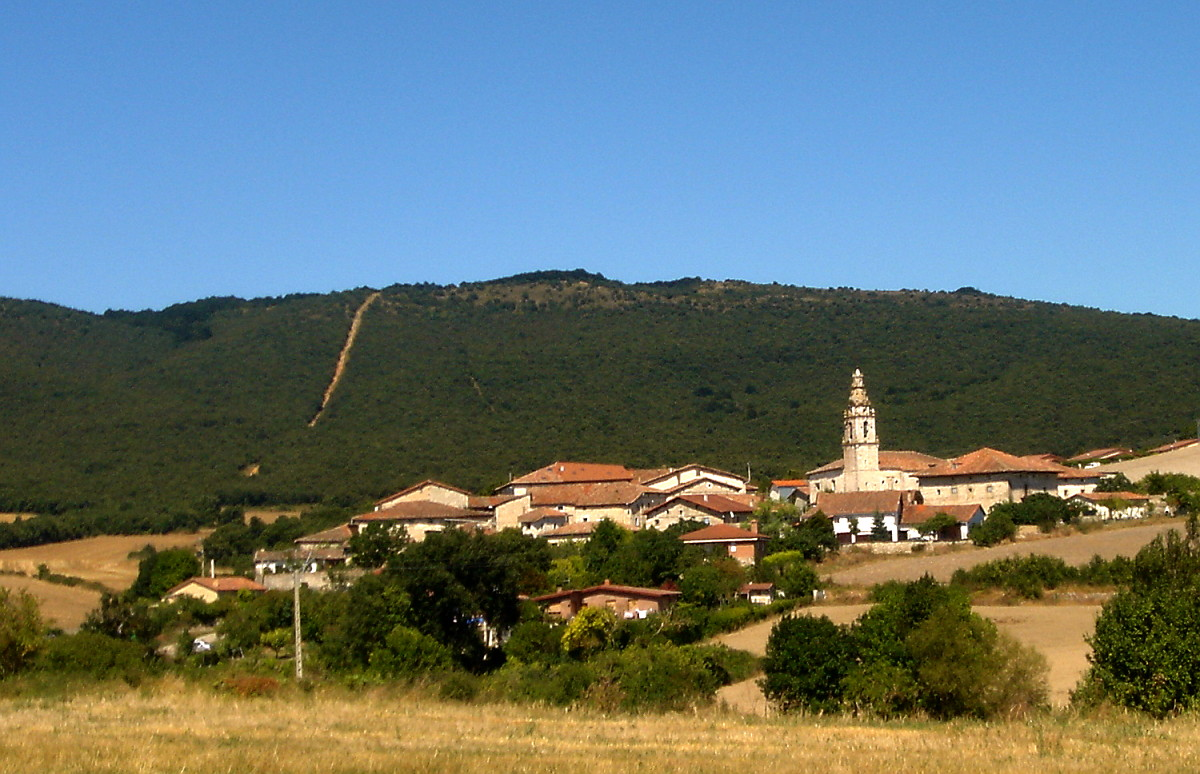

- Location within Province of Burgos Location within Castile and León Location within Spain
- Coordinates: 42°45′58″N 2°43′32″W
- Country: Spain
- Autonomous community: Castile and León
- Province: Province of Burgos
- Municipality: Condado de Treviño
- Elevation: 642 m (2,106 ft)

Population
  - Total: 38

Arrieta is a hamlet and minor local entity located in the municipality of Condado de Treviño, in Burgos province, Castile and León, Spain. As of 2020, it has a population of 38.

== Geography ==
Arrieta is located 105km east-northeast of Burgos.
