= San Martín de Zar =

- Minor local entity
- San Martín Zar
- Location within Province of Burgos Location within Castile and León Location within Spain
- Coordinates: 42°41′41″N 2°43′36″W
- Country: Spain
- Autonomous community: Castile and León
- Province: Province of Burgos
- Municipality: Condado de Treviño
- Elevation: 656 m (2,152 ft)

Population
  - Total: 5

San Martín de Zar or San Martín Zar is a hamlet and minor local entity located in the municipality of Condado de Treviño, in Burgos province, Castile and León, Spain. As of 2020, it has a population of 5.

== Geography ==
San Martín de Zar is located 110 km east-northeast of Burgos.
