= Torre (Treviño) =

- Minor local entity
- Location within Province of Burgos Location within Castile and León Location within Spain
- Coordinates: 42°41′39″N 2°40′26″W
- Country: Spain
- Autonomous community: Castile and León
- Province: Province of Burgos
- Municipality: Condado de Treviño
- Elevation: 593 m (1,946 ft)

Population
  - Total: 8

Torre is a hamlet and minor local entity located in the municipality of Condado de Treviño, in Burgos province, Castile and León, Spain. As of 2020, it has a population of 8.

== Geography ==
Torre is located 109km east-northeast of Burgos.
