= Dordóniz =

- Minor local entity
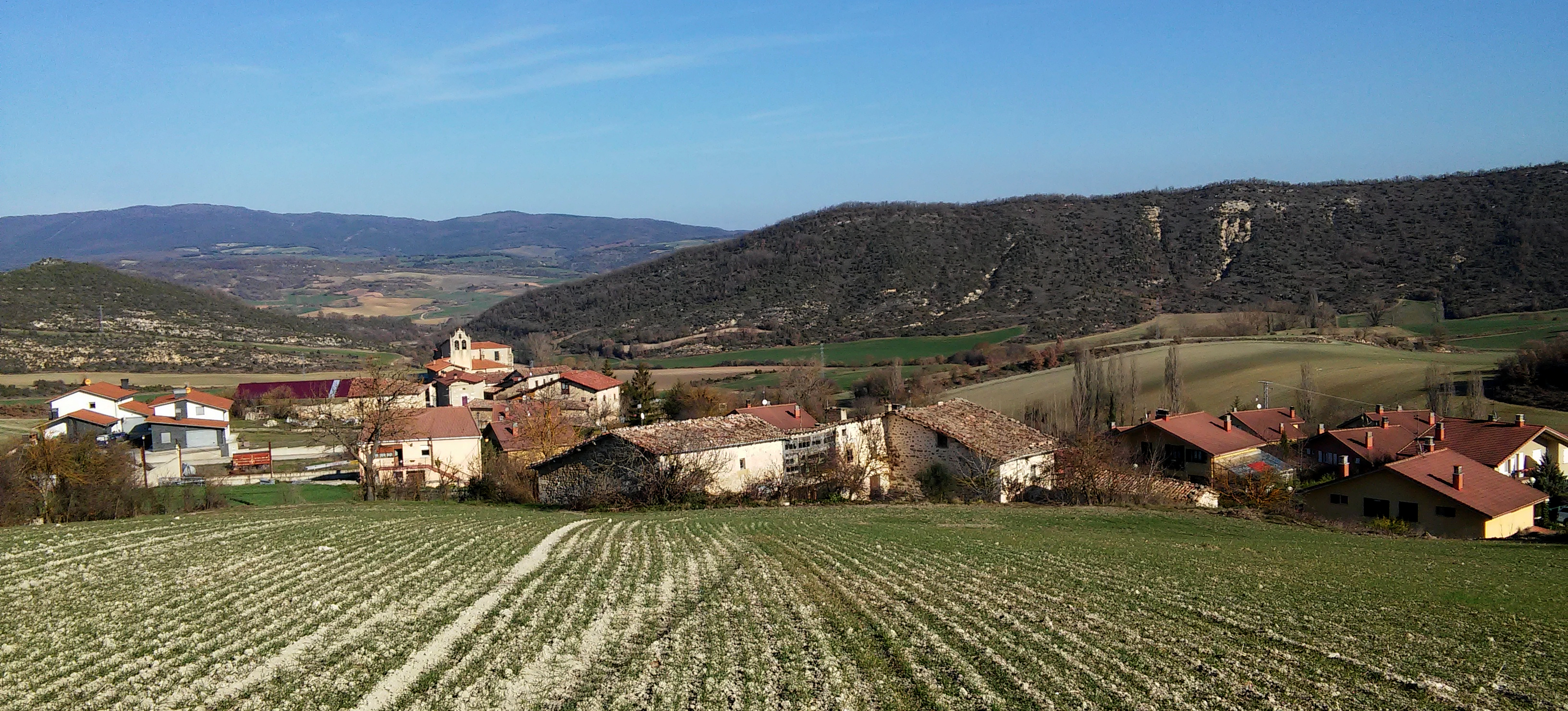

- Location within Province of Burgos Location within Castile and León Location within Spain
- Coordinates: 42°43′0″N 2°44′11″W
- Country: Spain
- Autonomous community: Castile and León
- Province: Province of Burgos
- Municipality: Condado de Treviño
- Elevation: 616 m (2,021 ft)

Population
  - Total: 38

Dordóniz is a hamlet and minor local entity located in the municipality of Condado de Treviño, in Burgos province, Castile and León, Spain. As of 2020, it has a population of 38.

== Geography ==
Dordóniz is located 105km east-northeast of Burgos.
