= Muergas =

- Minor local entity
- Location within Province of Burgos Location within Castile and León Location within Spain
- Coordinates: 42°43′36″N 2°48′20″W
- Country: Spain
- Autonomous community: Castile and León
- Province: Province of Burgos
- Municipality: Condado de Treviño
- Elevation: 607 m (1,991 ft)

Population
  - Total: 3

Muergas is a hamlet and minor local entity located in the municipality of Condado de Treviño, in Burgos province, Castile and León, Spain. As of 2020, it has a population of 3.

== Geography ==
Muergas is located 98km east-northeast of Burgos.
