= Golernio =

- Minor local entity
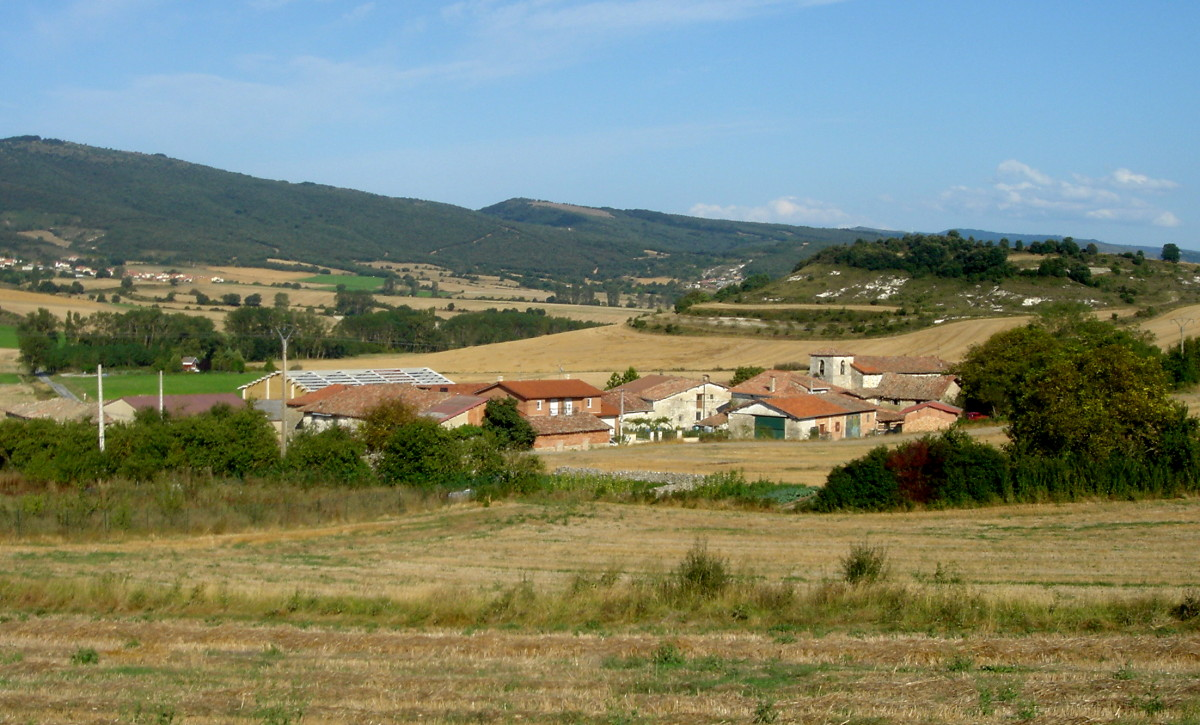

- Location within Province of Burgos Location within Castile and León Location within Spain
- Coordinates: 42°45′52″N 2°45′18″W
- Country: Spain
- Autonomous community: Castile and León
- Province: Province of Burgos
- Municipality: Condado de Treviño
- Elevation: 649 m (2,129 ft)

Population
  - Total: 9

Golernio is a hamlet and minor local entity located in the municipality of Condado de Treviño, in Burgos province, Castile and León, Spain. As of 2020, it has a population of 9.

== Geography ==
Golernio is located 103km east-northeast of Burgos.
