= Ozana, Spain =

Ozana
- Minor local entity
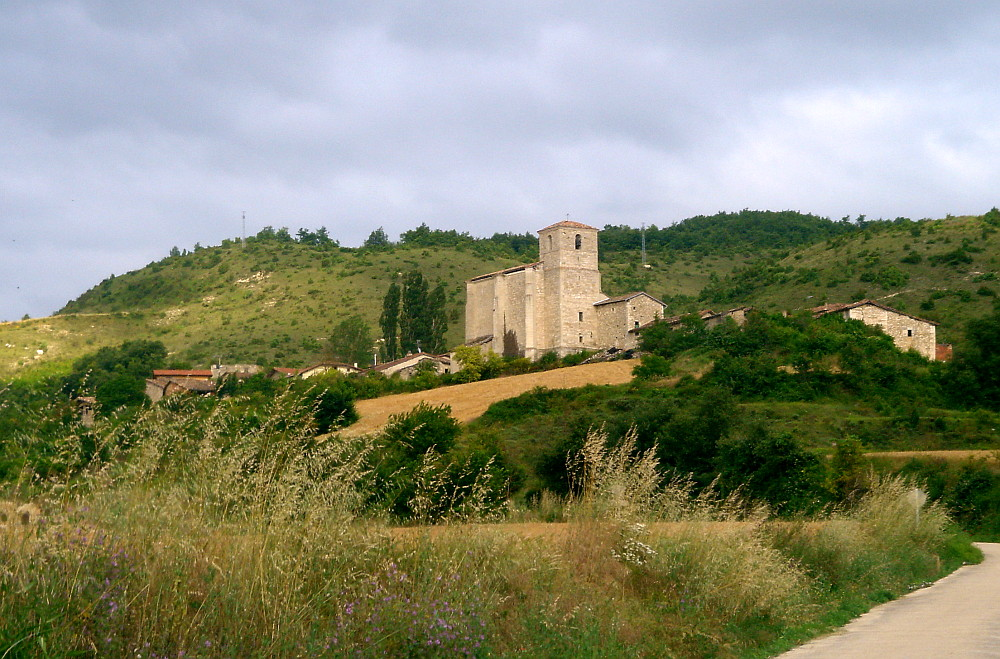

- Location within Province of Burgos Location within Castile and León Location within Spain
- Coordinates: 42°42′41″N 2°47′40″W
- Country: Spain
- Autonomous community: Castile and León
- Province: Province of Burgos
- Municipality: Condado de Treviño
- Elevation: 554 m (1,818 ft)

Population
  - Total: 12

Ozana is a hamlet and minor local entity located in the municipality of Condado de Treviño, in Burgos province, Castile and León, Spain. As of 2020, it has a population of 12.

== Geography ==
Ozana is located 101km east-northeast of Burgos.
