= Taravero =

- Minor local entity
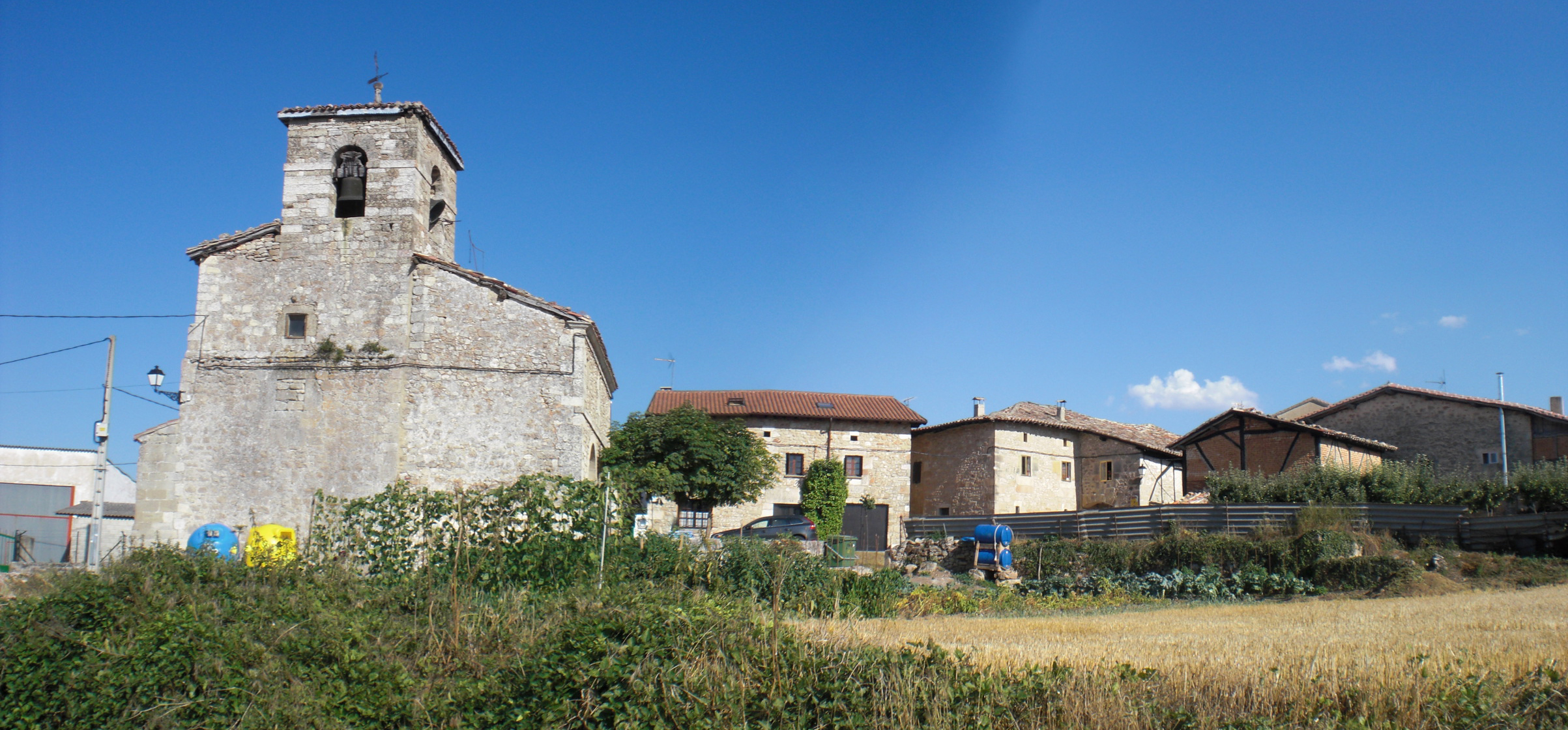

- Location within Province of Burgos Location within Castile and León Location within Spain
- Coordinates: 42°41′26″N 2°44′9″W
- Country: Spain
- Autonomous community: Castile and León
- Province: Province of Burgos
- Municipality: Condado de Treviño
- Elevation: 656 m (2,152 ft)

Population
  - Total: 13

Taravero is a hamlet and minor local entity in the municipality of Condado de Treviño, in Burgos province, Castile and León, Spain. As of 2020, it had a population of 13.

== Geography ==
Taravero is located 102km east-northeast of Burgos.
