= Condado de Treviño =

Condado de Treviño, Spain
- Coat of arms
- Nickname: Treviño
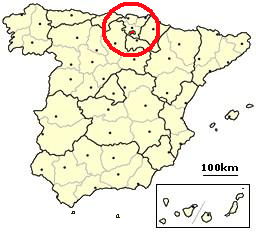
- Coordinates: 42°44′5″N 2°44′50″W
- Country: Spain
- Autonomous community: Castile and León
- Province: Burgos
- Comarca: Ebro

Government
  - Mayor (Alcalde): Ernesto Argote (CDC)

Area
  - Total: 260.71 km^{2} (100.66 sq mi)
- Elevation: 552 m (1,811 ft)

Population (2025-01-01)
  - Total: 1,468
  - Density: 5.631/km^{2} (14.58/sq mi)
  - Demonym: treviñeses
- INE
- Time zone: UTC+1 (CET)
  - Summer (DST): UTC+2 (CEST)
- Postal code: 09215/09216/09217/09294
- Patron saint: Saint Formerio

Condado de Treviño ("County of Treviño"; Basque: Trebiñuko Konderria) is a municipality in the province of Burgos, autonomous community of Castile and León, Spain. This municipality and the geographically smaller La Puebla de Arganzón make up the enclave of Treviño. Although the enclave is part of Burgos (and, hence, part of the autonomous community of Castile and León) it is surrounded by the province of Álava, part of the autonomous community of the Basque Country. The seat of the municipality is Treviño.

As of 2015, the municipality had a population of 1,362.

== History ==
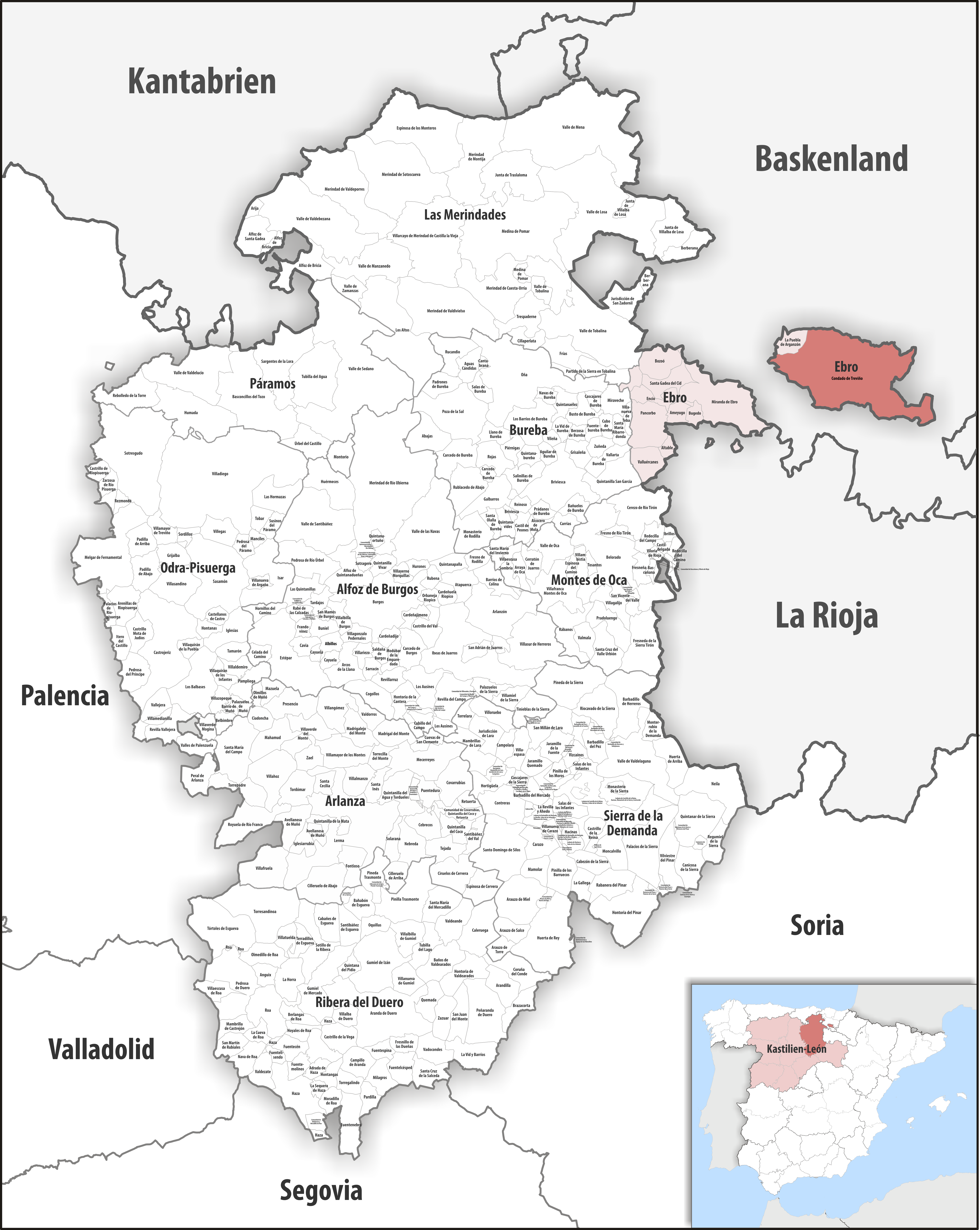
Location of Condado de Treviño in the province of Burgos

An abundance of prehistoric remains testify that Condado de Treviño has been inhabited since ancient times. In pre-Roman times, the Varduls, Caristios and Autrigones all lived here at one time or another, attesting to the region's strategic importance.

In the hamlet of Laño one can still see artificial caves that were inhabited by hermits more than 1500 years ago. The Las Gobas caves preserve inscriptions and drawings of animals.

Treviño, the capital of Condado de Treviño was founded some time between 1151 and 1161 by Navarrese king Sancho VI ("Sancho El Sabio", "Sancho the Wise"). In 1200 it was conquered by Alfonso VIII of Castile.

As a crossroads in the Middle Ages, the city of Treviño had an important Jewish quarter. Another early village was Sáseta on the Camino del Vino y el Pescado, the "road of wine and fish" that connected the Ebro valley to the Cantabrian coast.

On 8 April 1366, Henry II of Castile ceded to Pedro Manrique I de Lara, for services rendered, a seigneury consisting of Treviño de Uda and its outlying villages. In 1453 it became the Condado de Treviño as Gómez Manrique, the great-grandson of Pedro Manrique was given the title of Count. The Catholic Monarchs would later (in 1483) grant the title of Duke of Nájera to Gómez Manrique's son Pedro Manrique de Lara, a title that continues in the family down to the present day. In the 16th century these Counts of Treviño, Dukes de Nájera, would build a palace at Treviño, which is now the ayuntamiento (town hall) of the municipality.

Under the 1785 territorial disposition by the Count of Floridablanca, the Condado de Treviño formed part of the partido de Miranda de Ebro; it was divided into the town of Treviño and four cuadrillas: the Cuadrilla de Abajo, the Cuadrilla de río Somoayuda, Cuadrilla de Val de Lauri and the Cuadrilla de Val de Tobera.

== The enclave ==
After Castile conquered Álava (1200), most of the region was left under the relatively egalitarian fueros typical of the Basque Country. Treviño was not. However, reportedly Treviño was annexed to Castile somewhat later after the fall of Vitoria-Gasteiz. First a royal seigneury, and later under the rule of a noble family, Treviño remained tied to Castile. In 1358 and 1417 Treviño joined the fraternities made up of several towns in the heartland and fringes of Álava, the core of the present-day province. However, the Castilian king, failing to honour his oaths, assigned Treviño to the Manrique de Lara aristocrats, to become to counts of Treviño (County in 1453).

The county made several petitions for its reincorporation to Álava. The first took place in 1646, led by the members and representatives of the local council backed up by 390 supportive signatures (households) from 44 spots all across the county, when the petition was turned down by the Crown of Castile and probably the count. The enclave of Treviño was one of the few enclaves preserved in the 1833 territorial division of Spain, an island of Old Castile in the midst of Álava. Two further attempts ensued for the re-incorporation to Álava before the Civil War, 1917–19 and 1936, both within the context of the works to design a Basque statute of autonomy.

In 1998 a referendum was held to poll its inhabitants on the possible attachment of the county to the province of Álava. The votation resulted in a turnout of 76% with a 68% advocating to join Álava. A like referendum was held first time in 1940 just after the civil war, with a 98% of the voters supporting the same option, which nowadays is backed primarily, but not only, by Basque nationalists. The Regional Council of Castile and León has opposed in modern times any such popular consultations on the matter or any binding effect of its results.

== Politics ==
The municipal elections of 2015 in the Condado de Treviño gave 2 council seats to independent "Ciudadanos del Condado" (Citizens of the Condado), 2 to the also independent (and pro-Basque) Agrupación Electoral Independiente del Condado de Treviño (Independent Group of the Condado de Trebiño), 2 to the centre-right People's Party, one for the independent "Condado para todos" (Condado for All), one to the left-wing Basque nationalist Euskal Herria Bildu, one to the centre-right Basque Nationalist Party and none to the centre-left Spanish Socialist Workers' Party.

== Demography ==
Añastro, Pariza and the above-mentioned Sáseta were once independent municipalities. Beginning with the 1857 census, the figures for the municipality of Condado de Treviño incorporate Pariza and Sáseta; beginning with the census of 1930 it incorporates Añastro as well. The adjacent La Puebla de Arganzón forms part of the same enclave, but remains a municipality in its own right.

Demographic evolution 1842–1920
1842	1857	1860	1877	1887	1897	1900	1910	1920
1940	4440	4393	3865	3801	3684	3701	3622	3694

Demographic evolution 1930–2008
1930	1940	1950	1960	1970	1981	1991	2001	2008
3946	3729	3554	2926	2182	1346	907	1139	1399

== Hamlets and towns ==
As can be seen from the numbers in the previous section, throughout most of the second half of the 20th century the population of Condado de Treviño declined steadily. Most of the population was moving to Vitoria, and in 1974 several pedanías—hamlets—ceased to have any formal existence and were simply aggregated into Treviño. The following juntas vecinales—local governments—were dissolved that year: Ajarte, Araico, Ascarza, Burgueta, Dordóniz, Grandival, Meana, Mesanza, Moscador, Pedruzo, Samiano, San Martín de Galvarín, San Vicentejo, Sáseta, and Zurbitu.

As of 2008 there are 36 minor local entities, the status within the autonomous community of Castile and León for a recognized community smaller than a municipality. They are as follows:

- Aguillo
- Albaina
- Añastro
- Argote
- Armentia
- Arrieta
- Ascarza
- Bajauri
- Burgueta
- Busto de Treviño
- Cucho
- Dordóniz
- Doroño
- Franco
- Fuidio
- Golernio
- Grandival
- Imiruri
- Laño
- Marauri
- Muergas
- Obécuri
- Ocilla y Ladrera
- Ogueta
- Ozana
- Pangua
- Pariza
- Samiano
- San Martín de Zar
- San Vicentejo
- Saraso
- Taravero
- Torre
- Treviño
- Uzquiano
- Villanueva Tobera

In addition, the following hamlets have no formal status:

- Ajarte
- Araico
- Arana
- Caricedo
- Meana
- Mesanza
- Moraza
- Moscador de Treviño
- Ochate
- Pedruzo
- San Esteban
- San Martín de Galvarín
- Sáseta
- Uralde
- Zurbitu

== Heritage sites and other places of interest ==
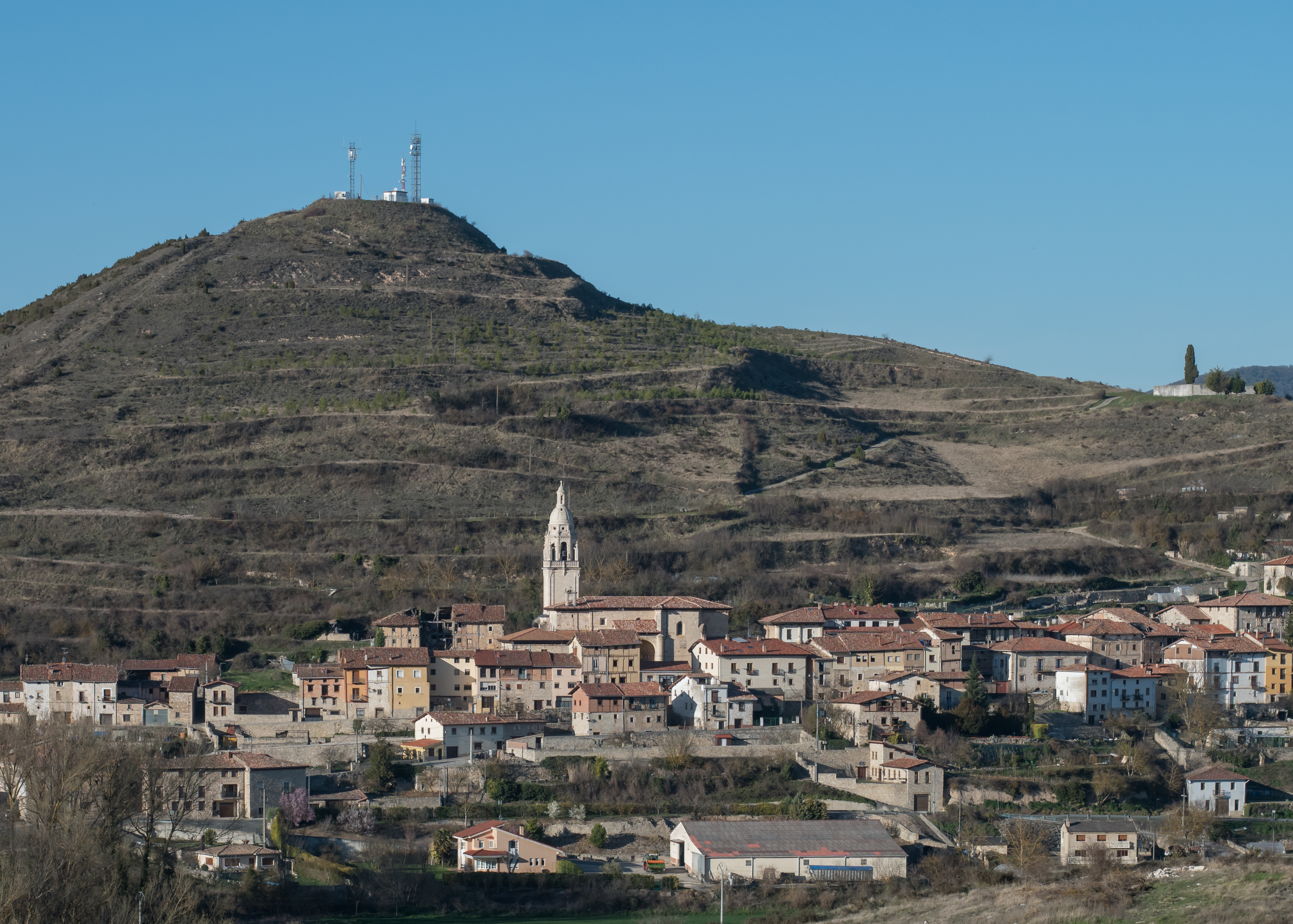
View of Treviño, the capital of the municipality.

Four sites within Condado de Treviño are formally recognized by the Spanish Ministry of Culture as part of Spain's Patrimonio Histórico (literally "historic patrimony", heritage sites):

- The Cuevas de Laño, artificial caves inhabited by hermits more than 1500 years ago, declared part of the Patrimonio Histórico 23 June 1978.
- The prehistoric caves of "Montico" in Albaina, declared 21 August 1976.
- The artistic-historic assemblage of the town of Treviño, declared 28 September 1983.
- Ermita (Hermitage) de la Purísima Concepción, in San Vicentejo, declared 11 March 1994.

Other places of interest include the forests of Obécuri and Bajauri; Izki Natural Park, with the largest massing of Quercus pyrenaica in Europe; the gorge of the river Ayuda; the route from Sáseta to Oquina, crossing Laño-Laguardia; the Aguillo-Ajarte crossing of Palogán mountain; the town of Pariza; the town of Cucho, whose buildings have been completely restored; and the hermitages of San Formerio, San Vicentejo, Ermita de Albaina, and Ermita de Pariza.

== Towns of Condado de Treviño ==
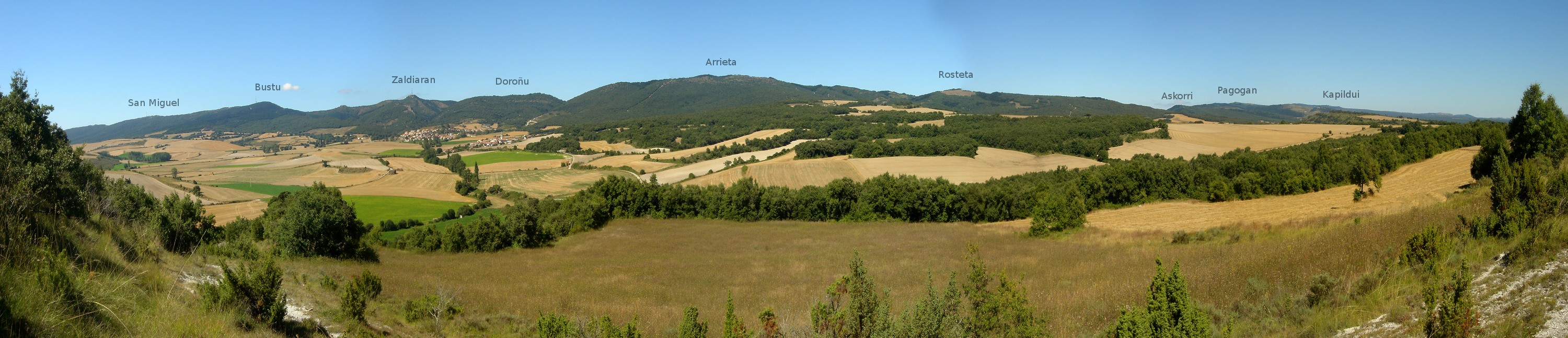
Panoramic view of the Montes de Vitoria on the northern border with the province of Álava.

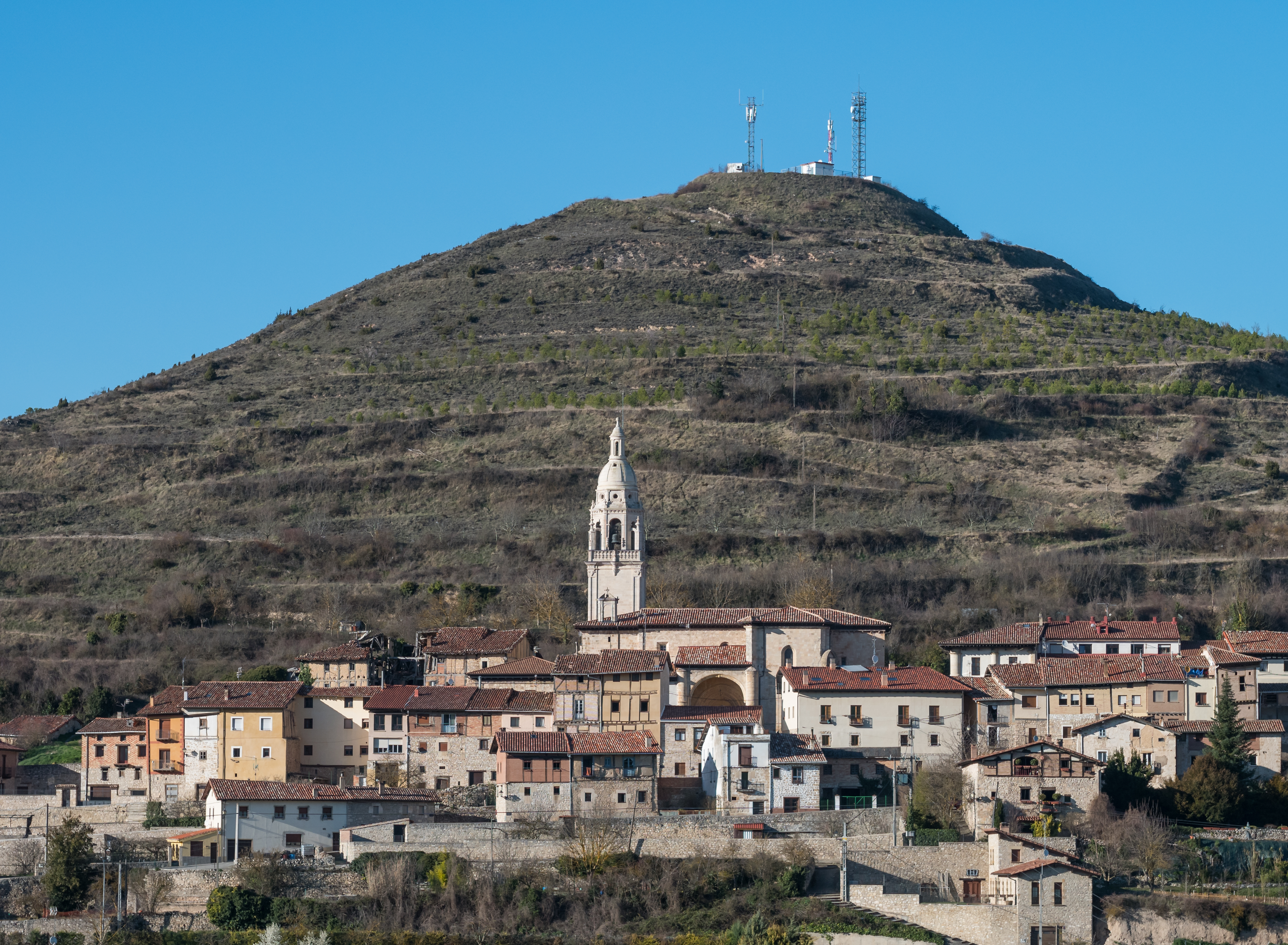
Treviño, the capital of Condado de Treviño

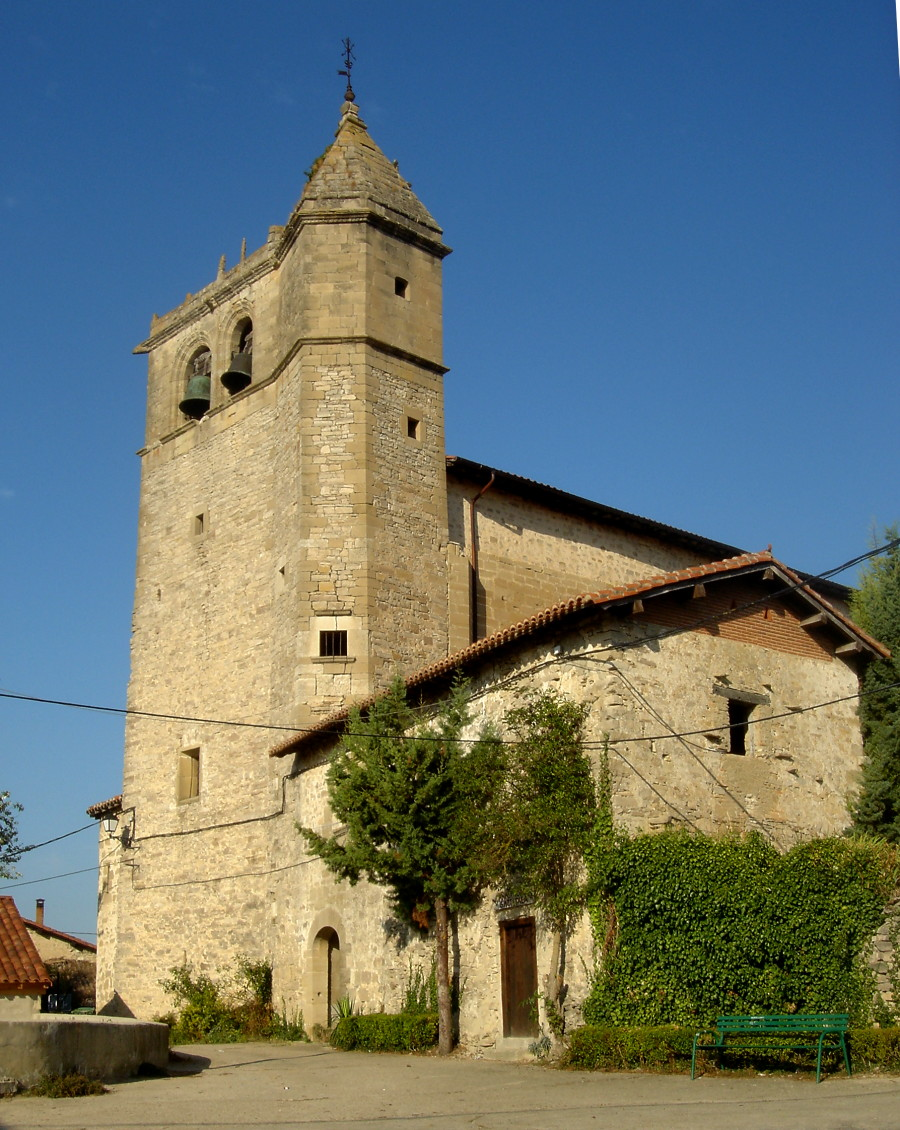
San Andrés Church (16th century) in Añastro

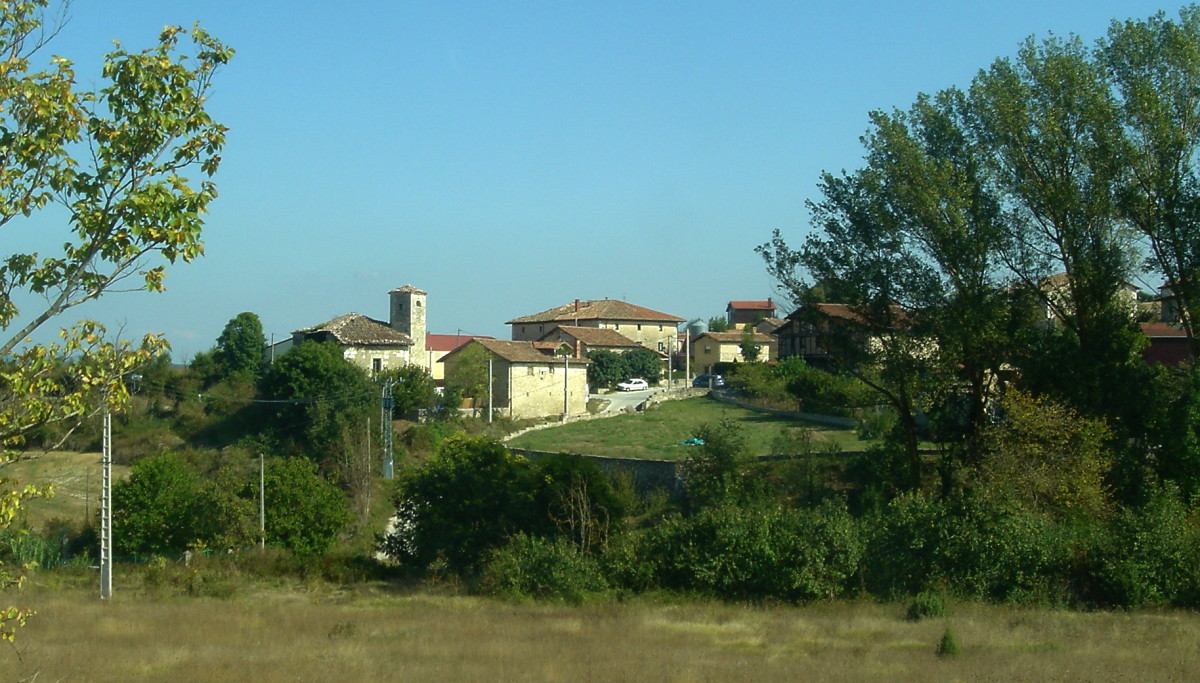
Armentia

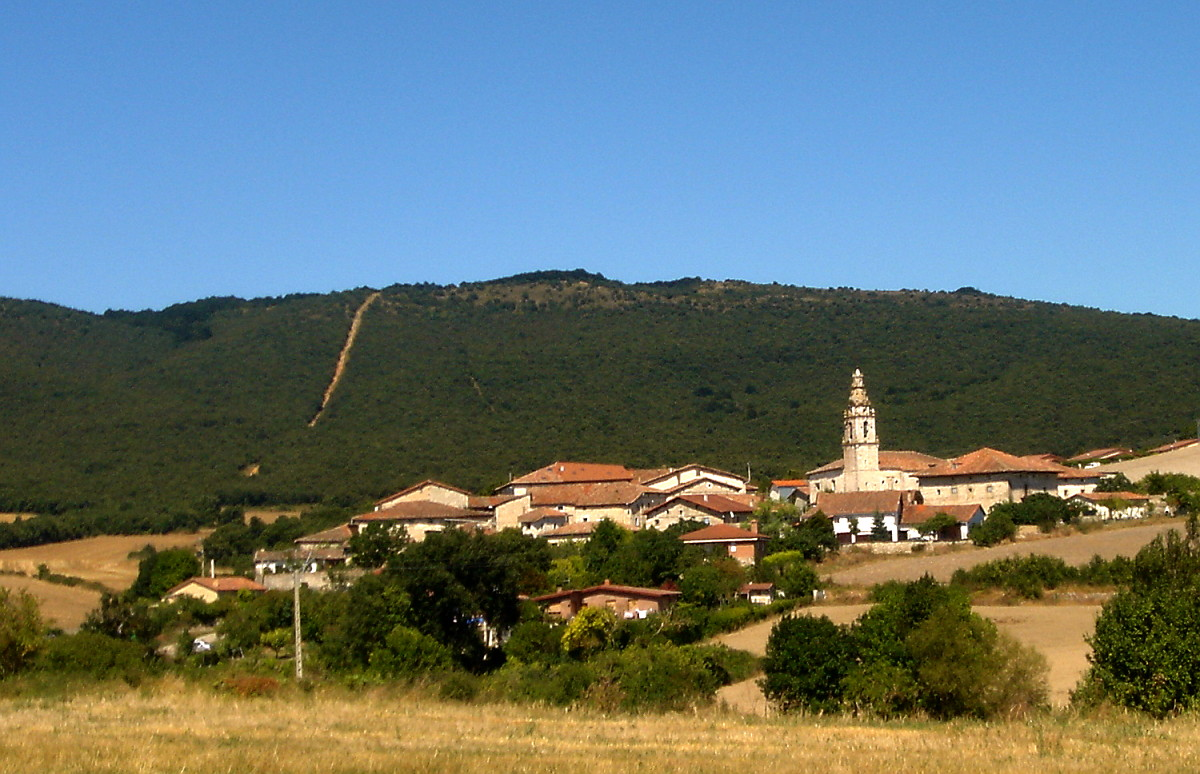
Arrieta (Burgos)

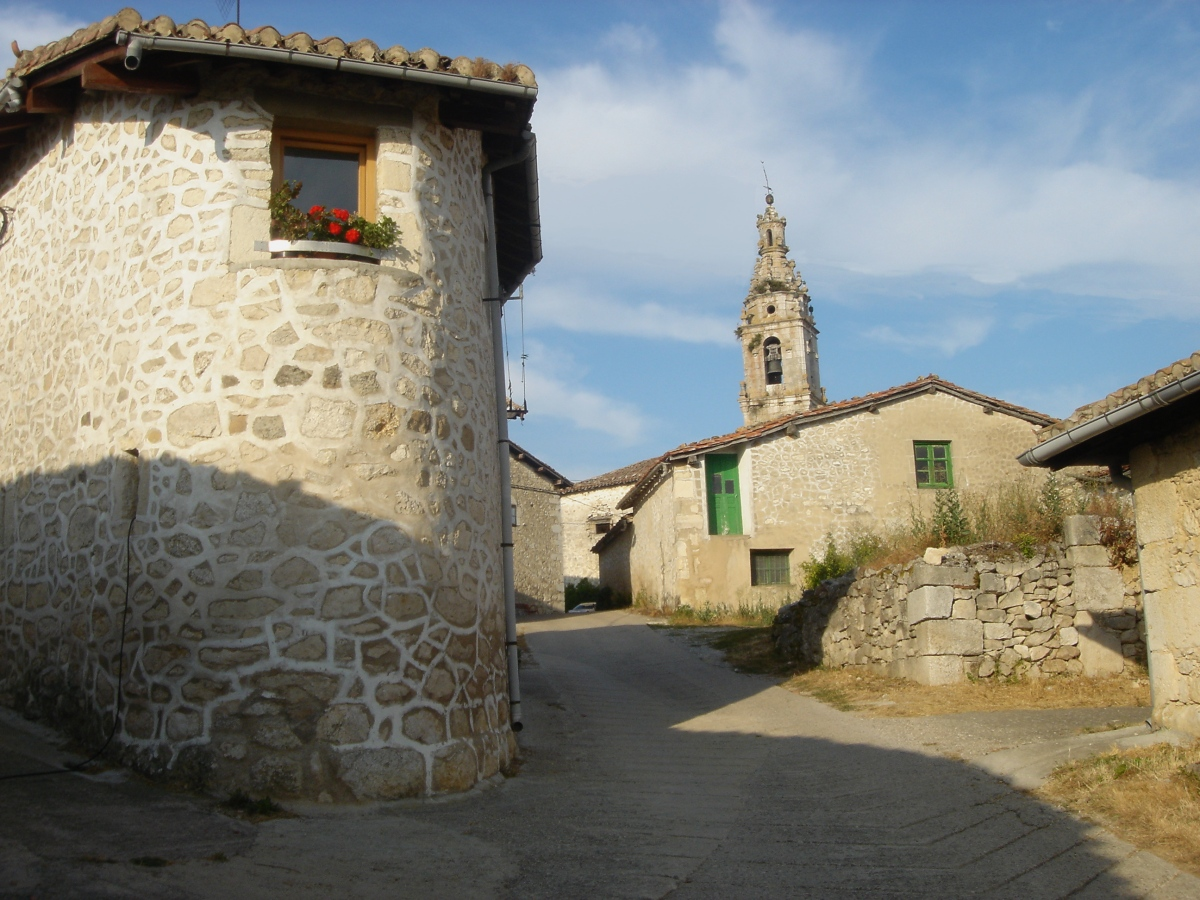
A street in Arrieta

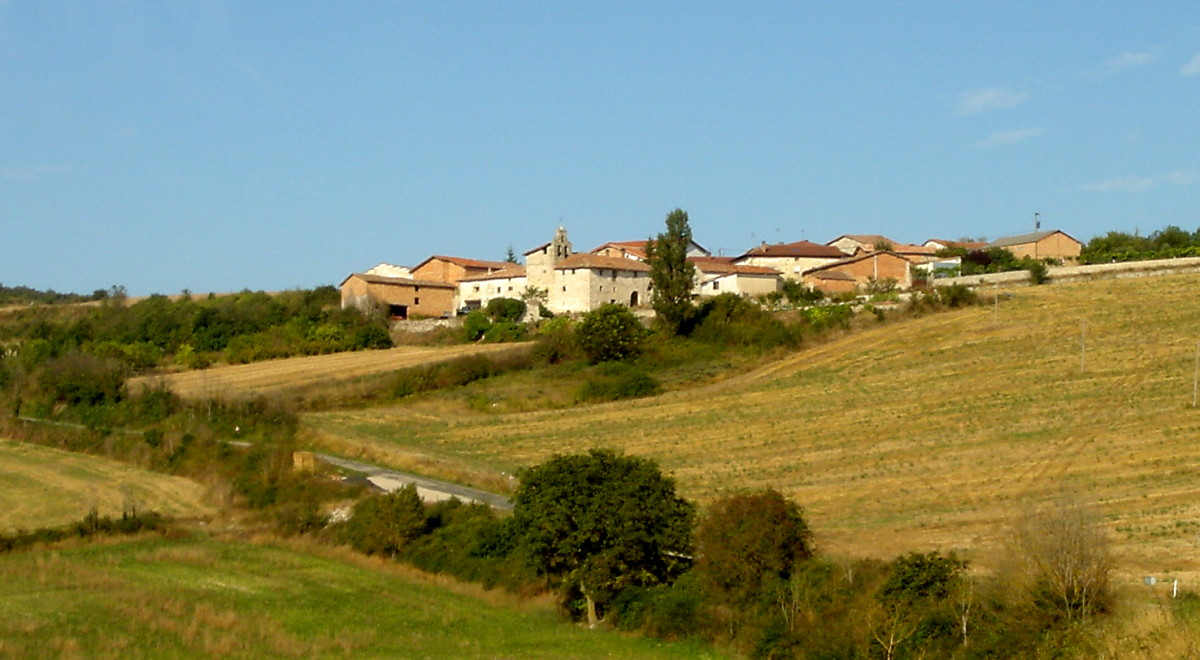
Busto de Treviño

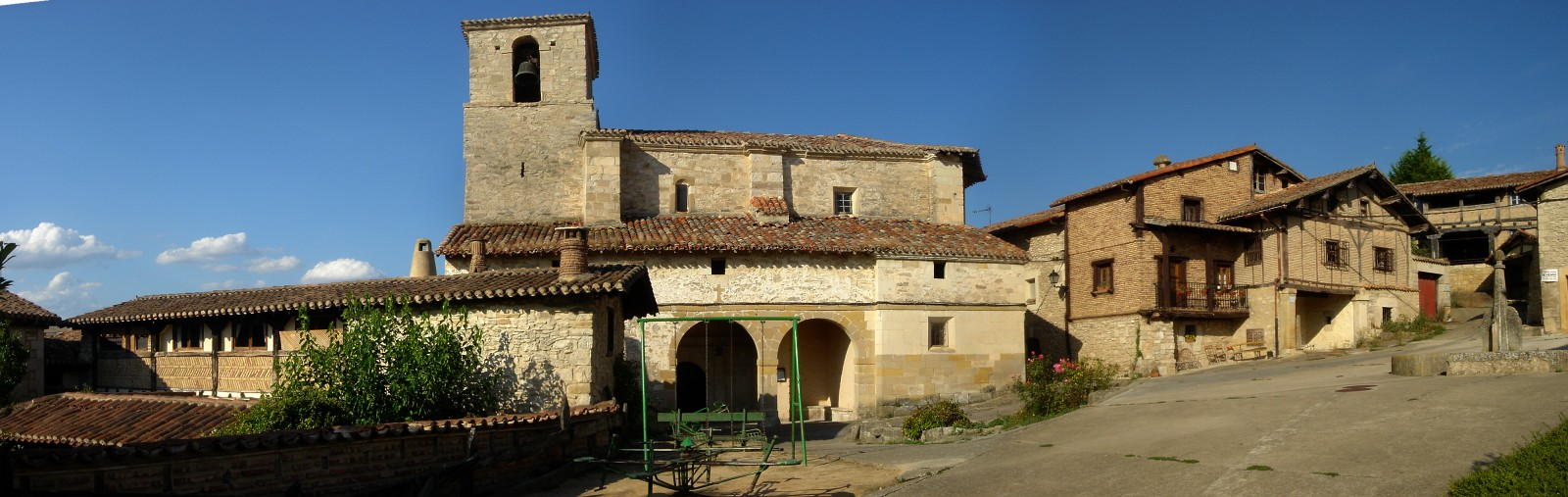
Invención de la Santa Cruz Church in Cucho

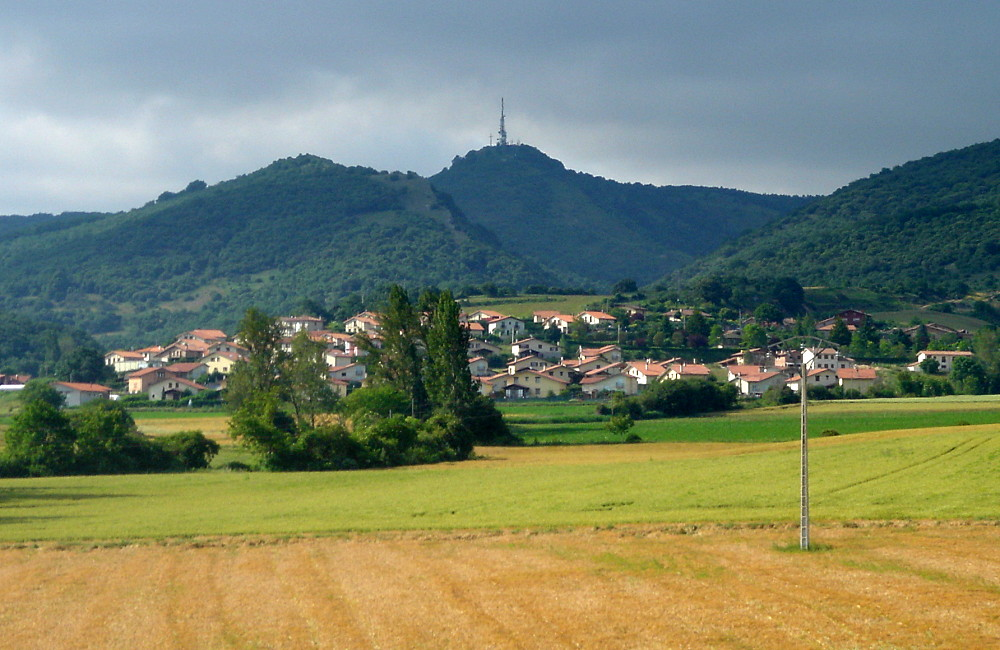
Doroño

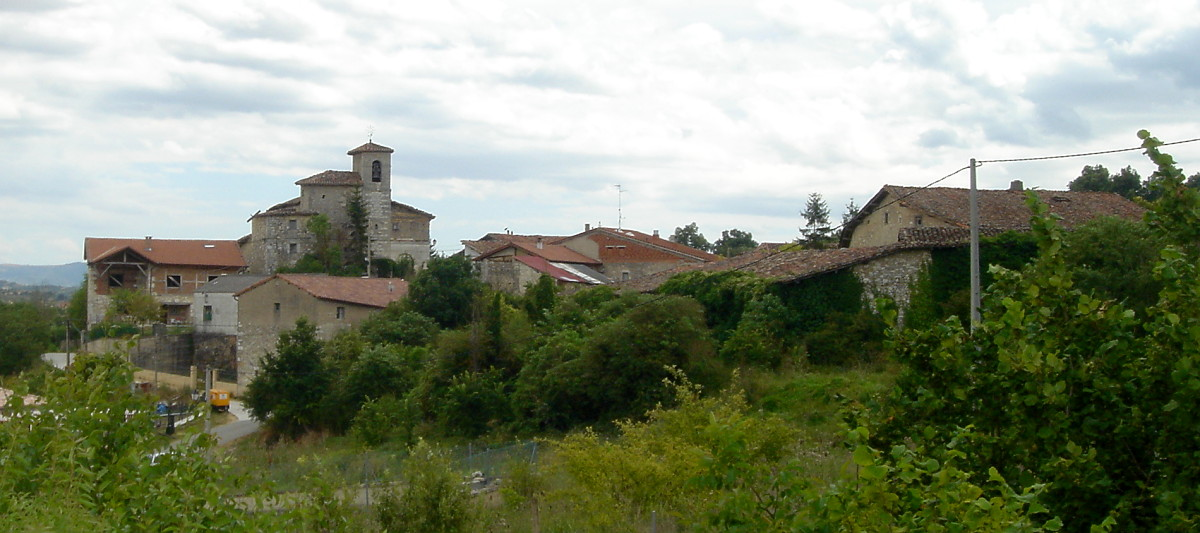
Franco town.

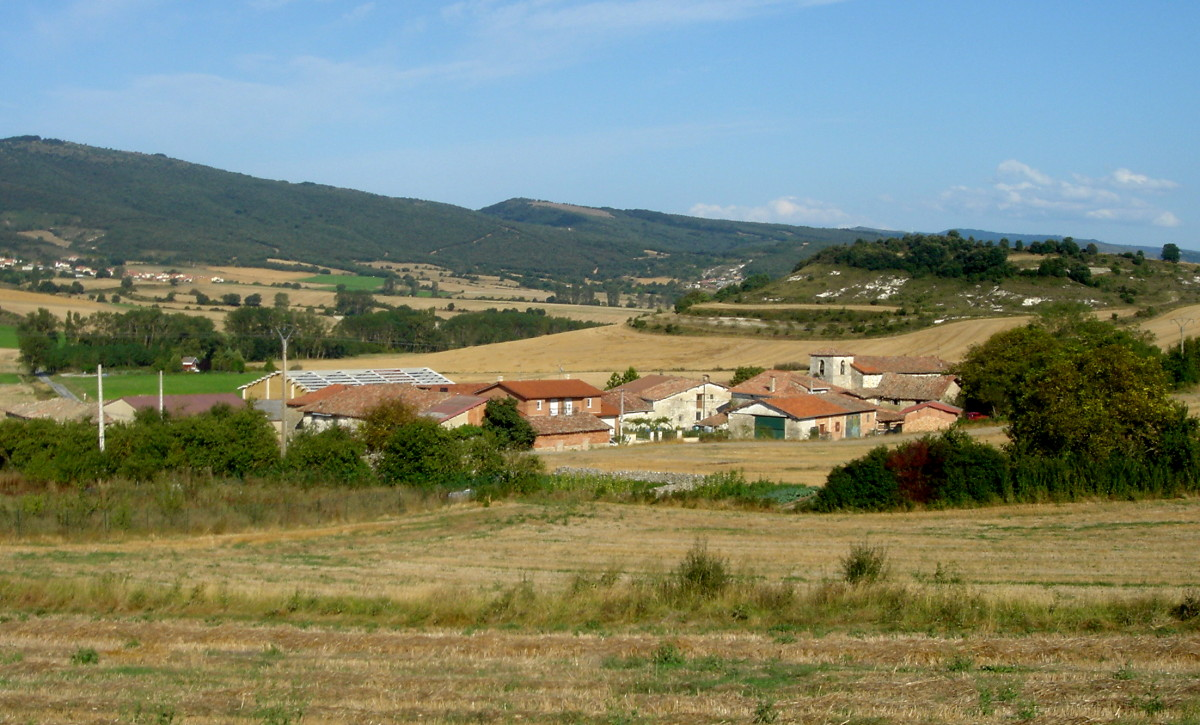
Golernio

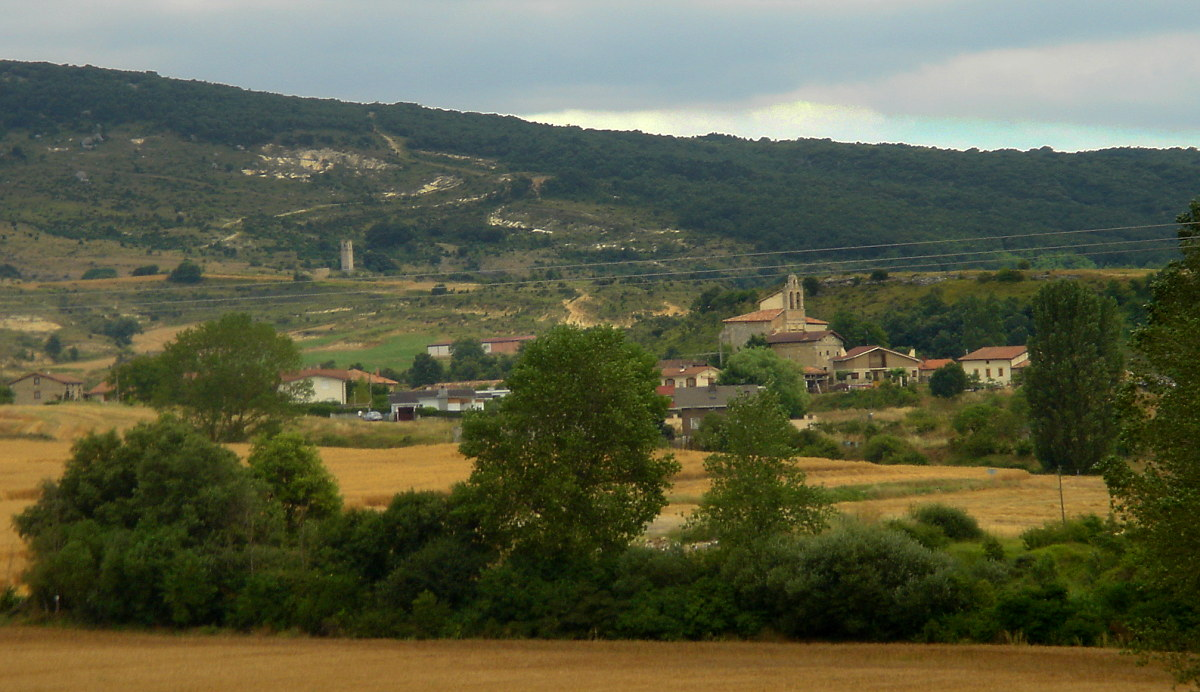
Imiruri

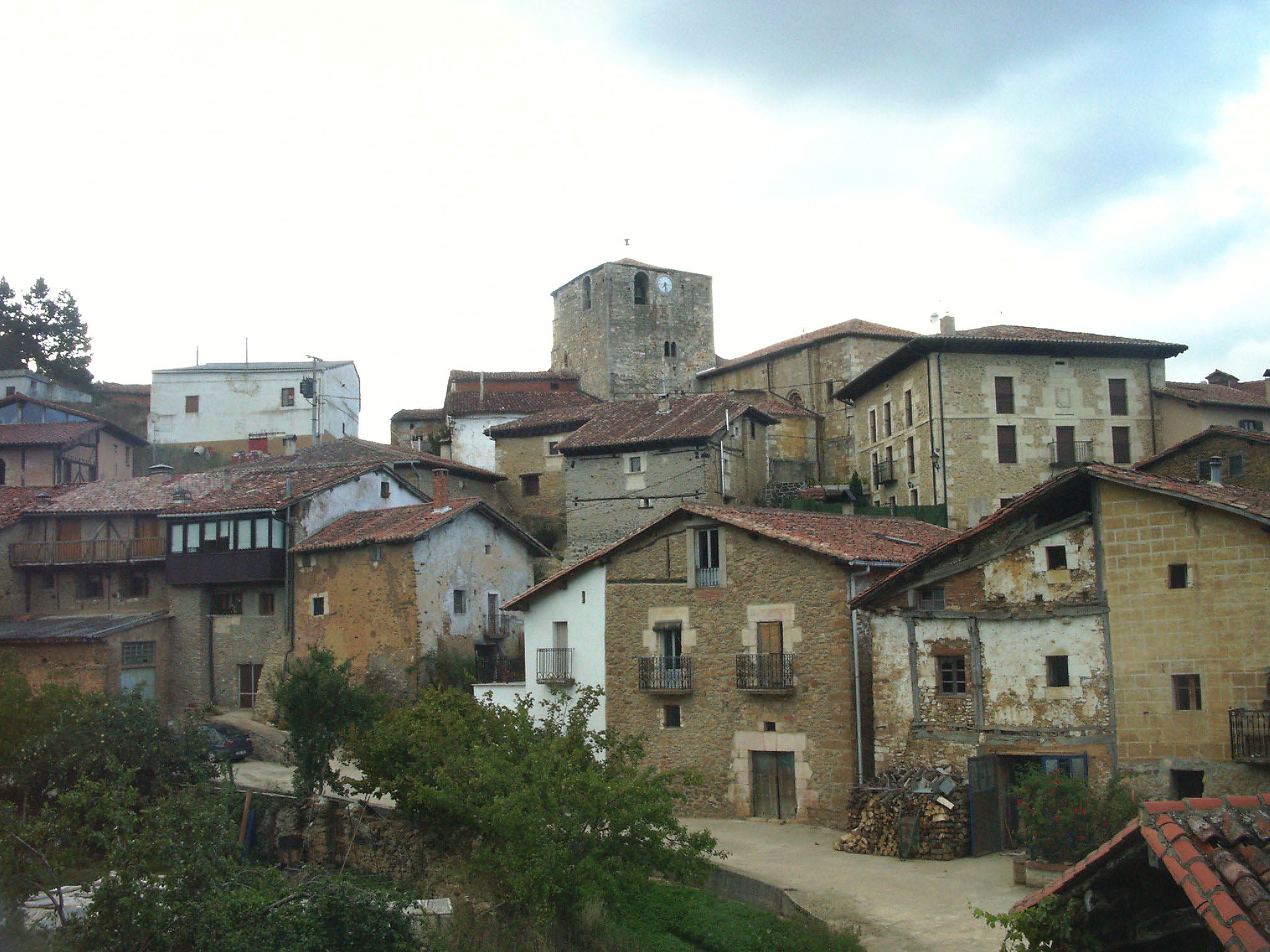
Obécuri

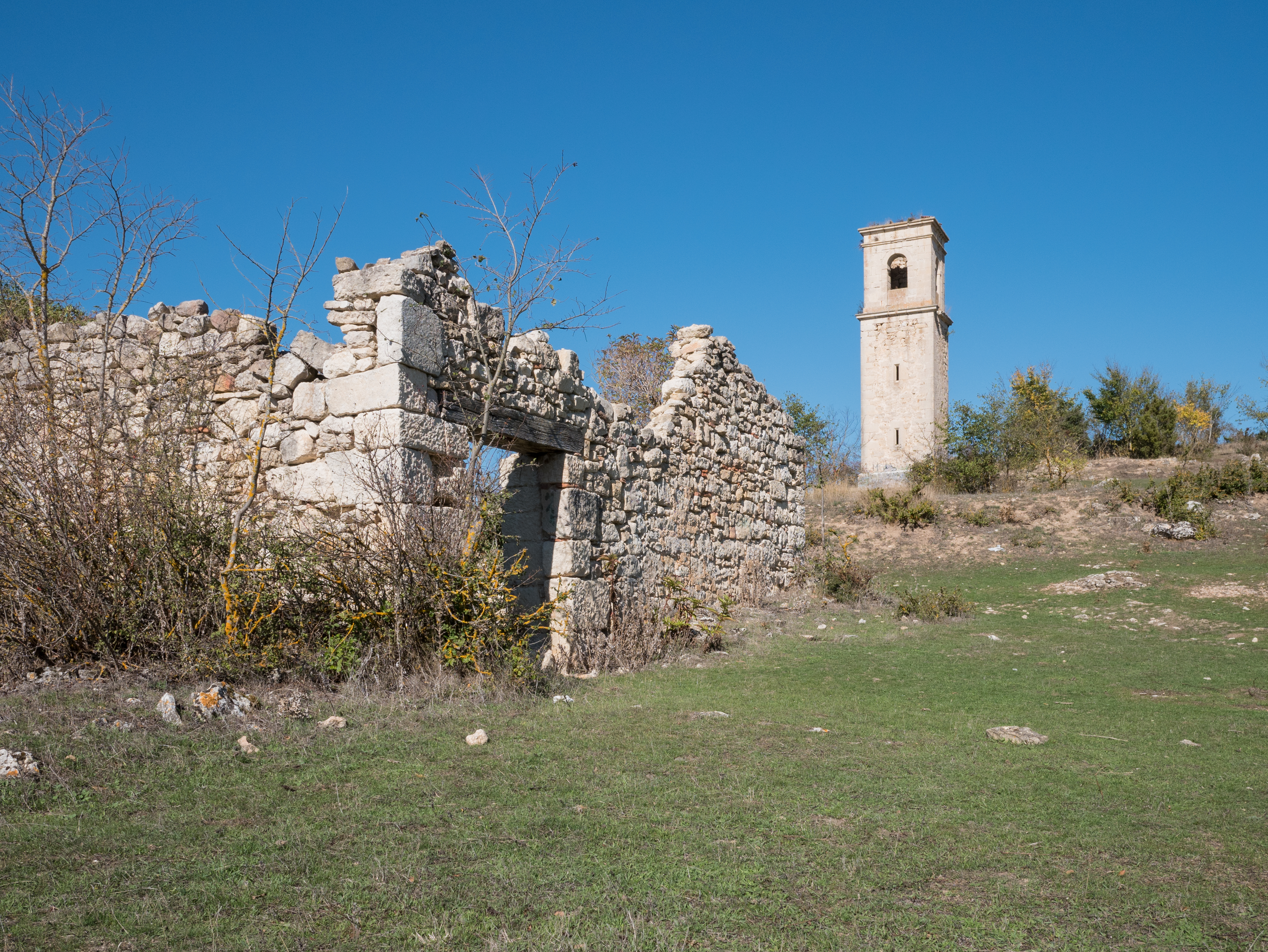
The abandoned town of Ochate, with the tower of the ancient San Miguel Church

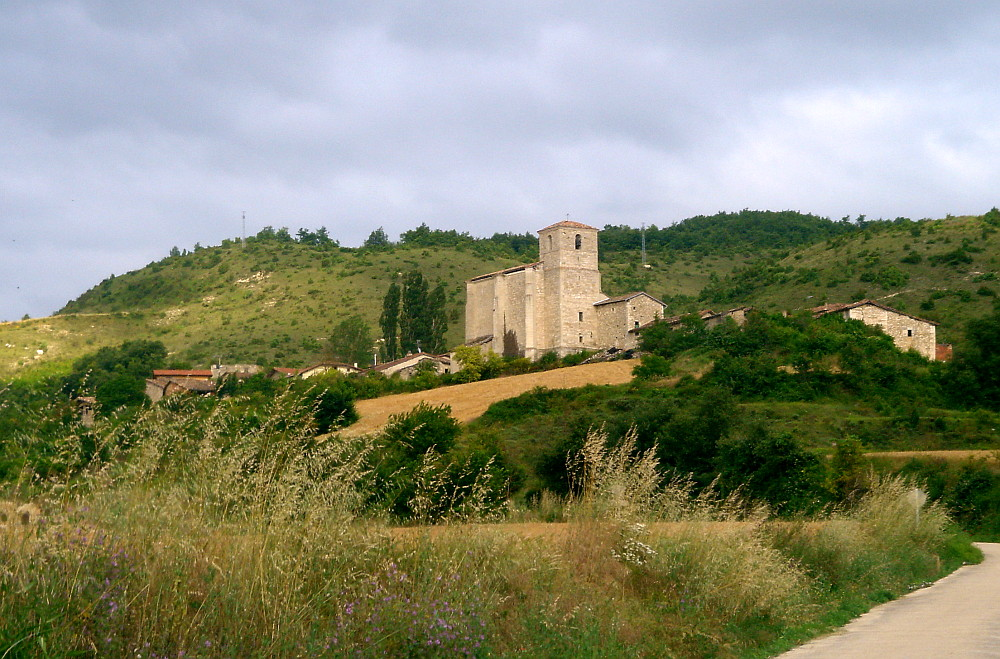
Asunción de Nuestra Señora Church in Ozana

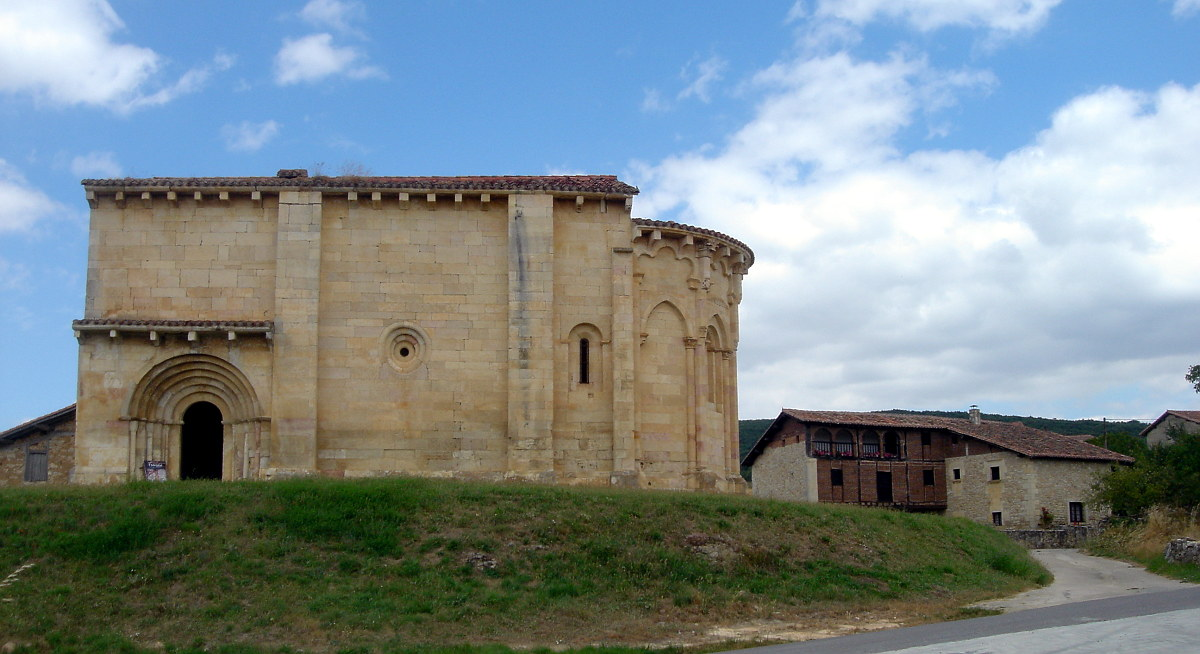
La Concepción Hermitage (12th century) in San Vicentejo

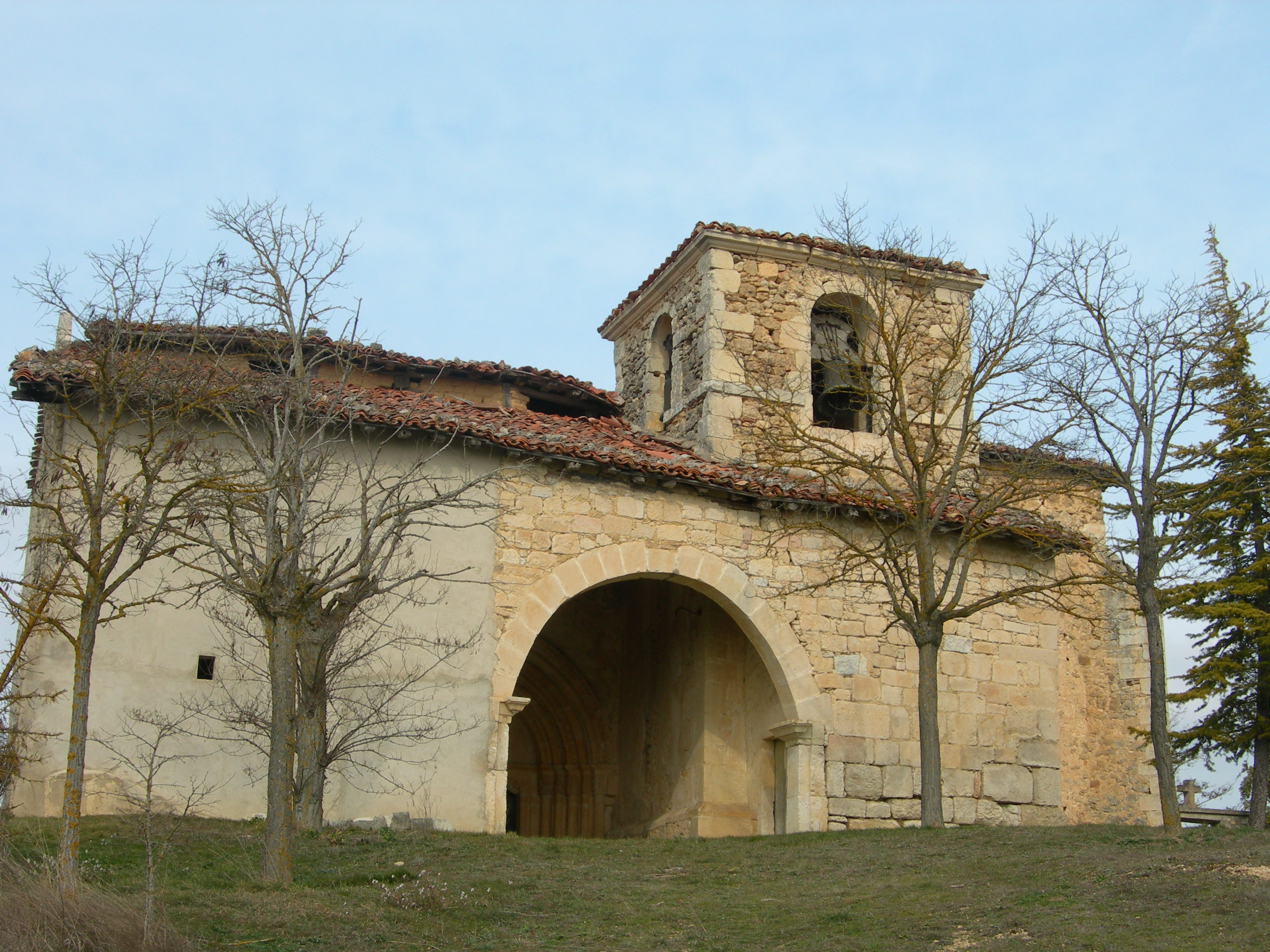
San Andrés Church (12th century) in Saraso

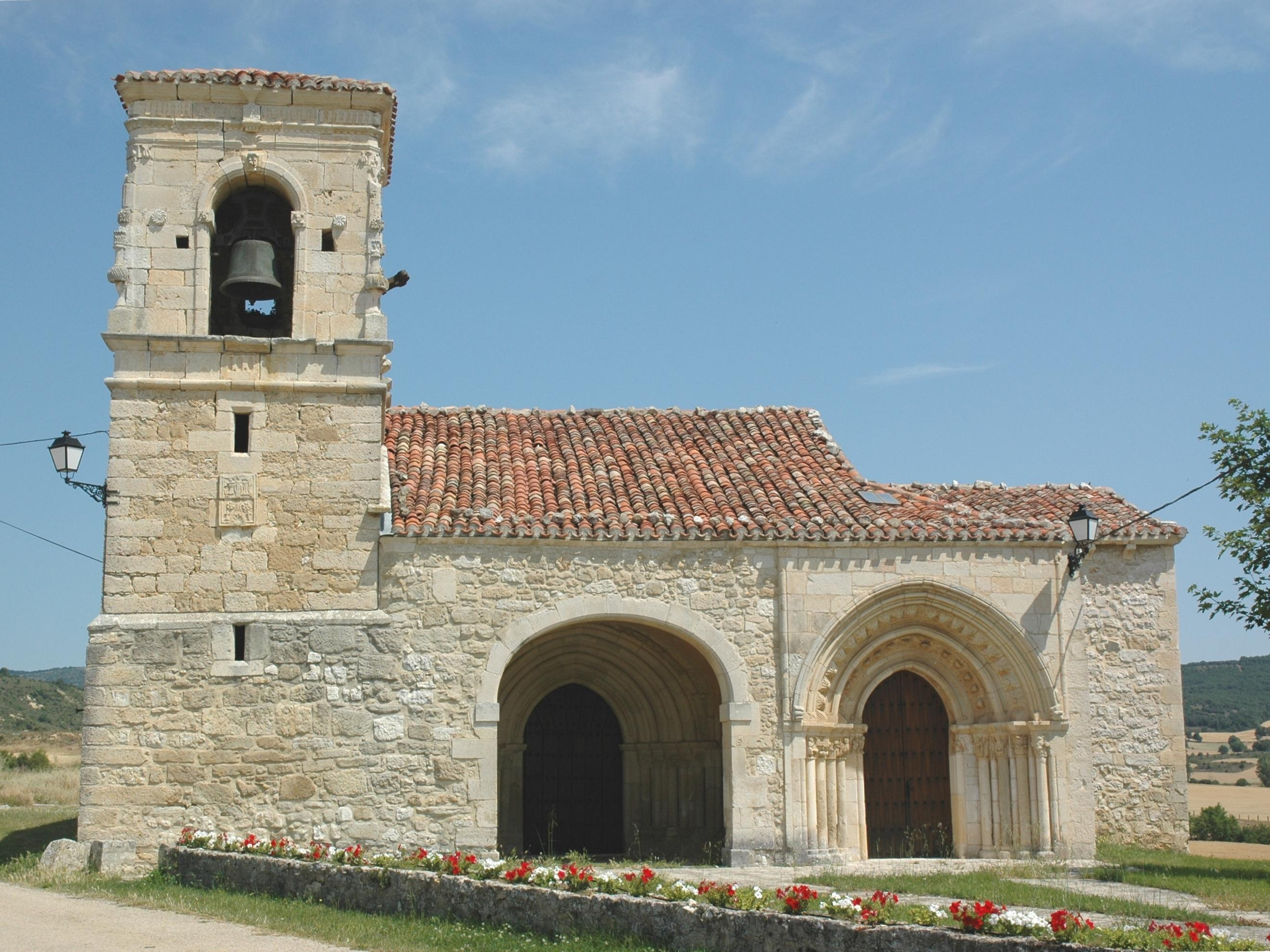
Late Romanesque church in Uzquiano
