= Busto de Treviño =

- Minor local entity
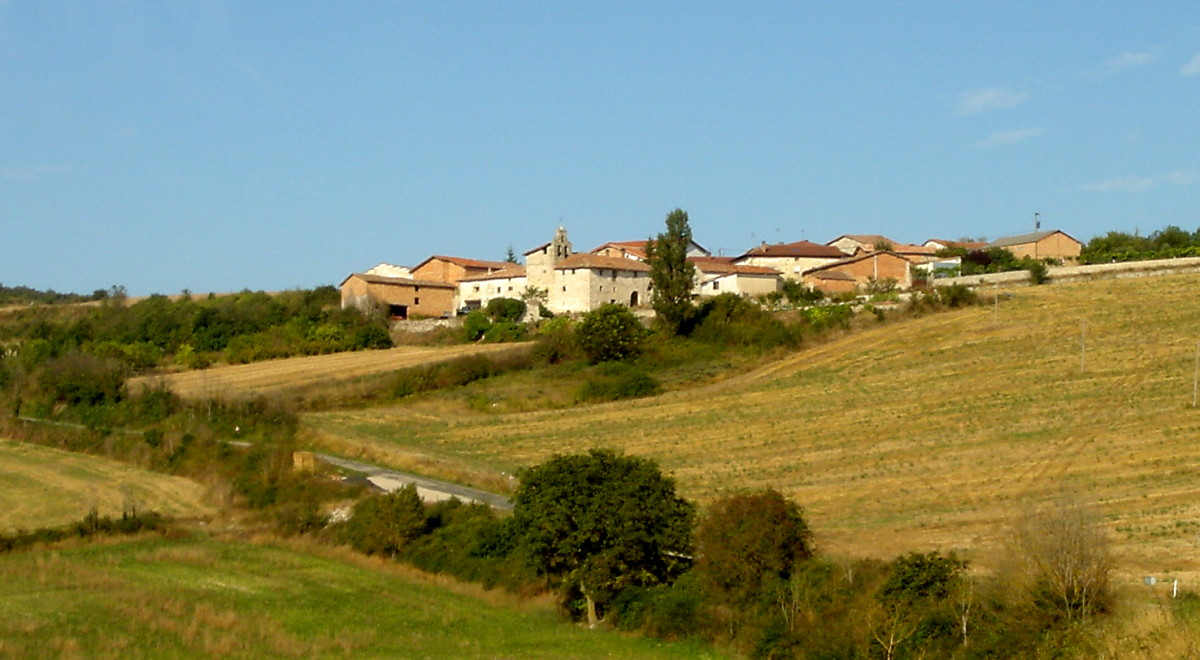

- Location within Province of Burgos Location within Castile and León Location within Spain
- Coordinates: 42°44′57″N 2°45′38″W
- Country: Spain
- Autonomous community: Castile and León
- Province: Province of Burgos
- Municipality: Condado de Treviño
- Elevation: 649 m (2,129 ft)

Population
  - Total: 8

Busto de Treviño is a hamlet and minor local entity located in the municipality of Condado de Treviño, in Burgos province, Castile and León, Spain. As of 2020, it has a population of 8.

== Geography ==
Busto de Treviño is located 101km east-northeast of Burgos.
