= Saraso =

- Minor local entity
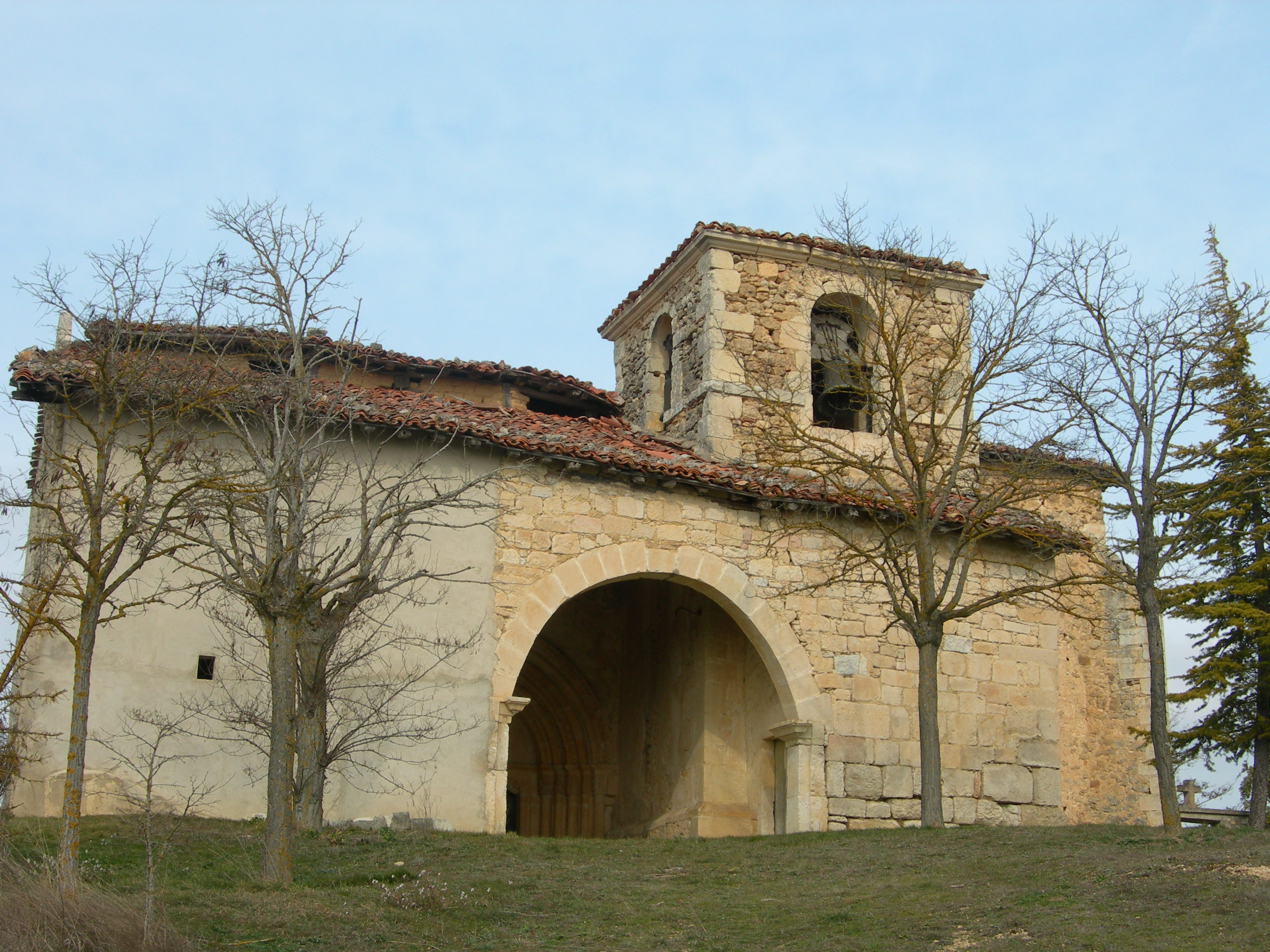

- Location within Province of Burgos Location within Castile and León Location within Spain
- Coordinates: 42°42′55″N 2°39′45″W
- Country: Spain
- Autonomous community: Castile and León
- Province: Province of Burgos
- Municipality: Condado de Treviño
- Elevation: 586 m (1,923 ft)

Population
  - Total: 18

Saraso is a hamlet and minor local entity located in the municipality of Condado de Treviño, in Burgos province, Castile and León, Spain. As of 2020, it has a population of 18.

== Geography ==
Saraso is located 109km east-northeast of Burgos.
