= Ocilla y Ladrera =

- Minor local entity
- Location within Province of Burgos Location within Castile and León Location within Spain
- Coordinates: 42°45′49″N 2°46′48″W
- Country: Spain
- Autonomous community: Castile and León
- Province: Province of Burgos
- Municipality: Condado de Treviño
- Elevation: 627 m (2,057 ft)

Population
  - Total: 5

Ocilla y Ladrera is a hamlet and minor local entity located in the municipality of Condado de Treviño, in Burgos province, Castile and León, Spain. As of 2020, it has a population of 5.

== Geography ==
Ocilla y Ladrera is located 99km east-northeast of Burgos.
