= Pangua =

- Minor local entity
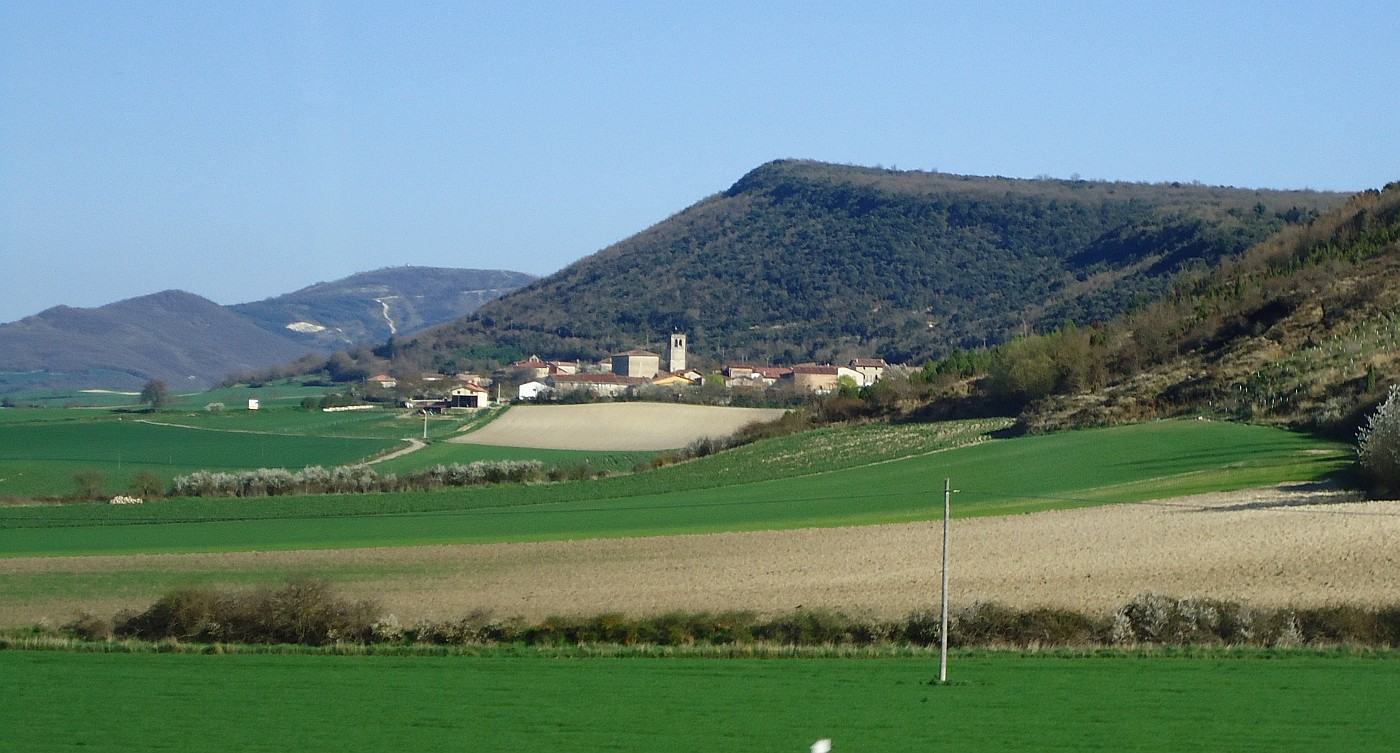

- Location within Province of Burgos Location within Castile and León Location within Spain
- Coordinates: 42°44′19″N 2°49′38″W
- Country: Spain
- Autonomous community: Castile and León
- Province: Province of Burgos
- Municipality: Condado de Treviño
- Elevation: 526 m (1,726 ft)

Population
  - Total: 11

Pangua is a hamlet and minor local entity located in the municipality of Condado de Treviño, in Burgos province, Castile and León, Spain. As of 2020, it has a population of 11.

== Geography ==
Pangua is located 93km east-northeast of Burgos.
