= Pariza =

- Minor local entity
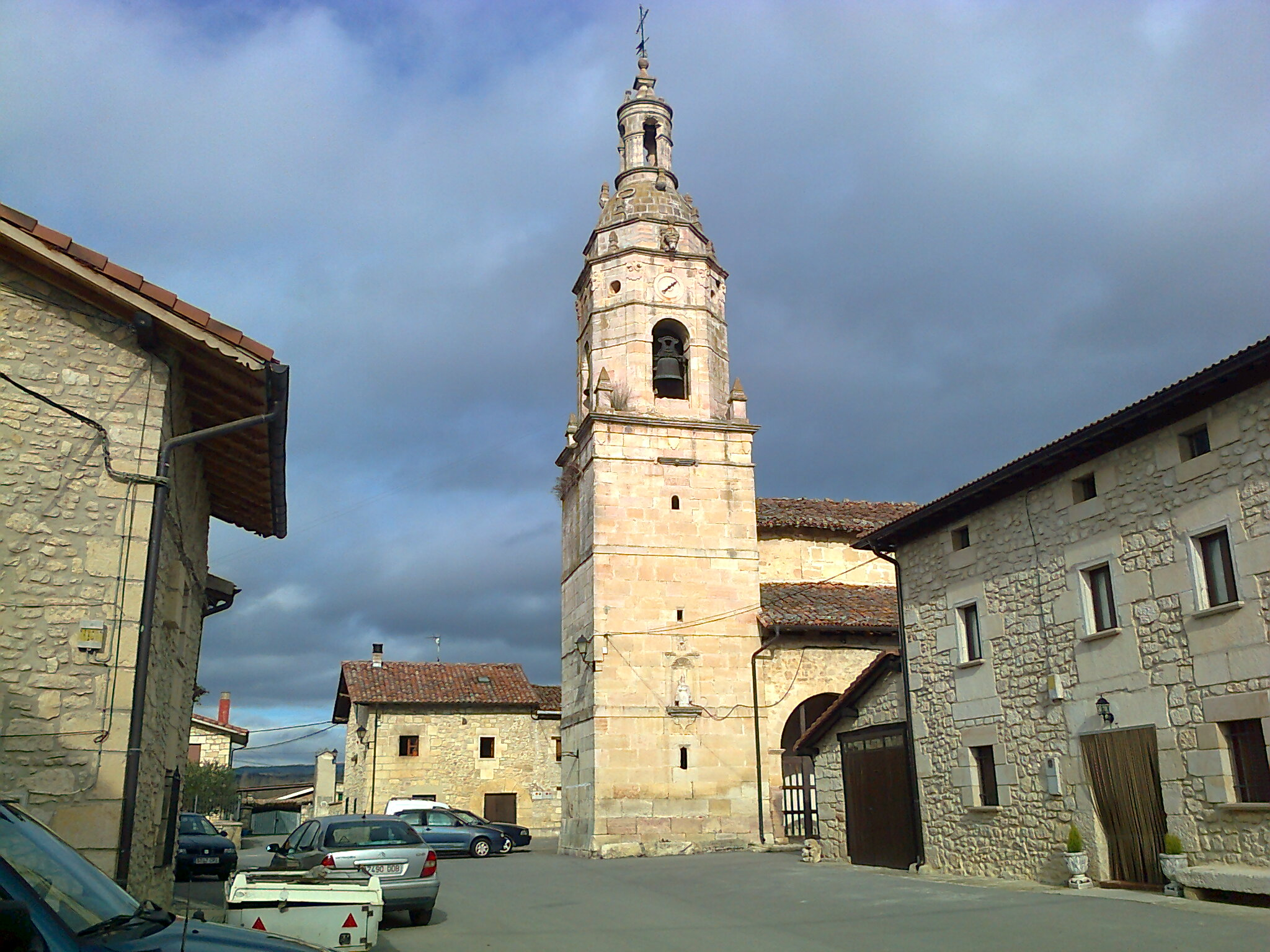

- Location within Province of Burgos Location within Castile and León Location within Spain
- Coordinates: 42°41′36″N 2°37′5″W
- Country: Spain
- Autonomous community: Castile and León
- Province: Province of Burgos
- Municipality: Condado de Treviño
- Elevation: 623 m (2,044 ft)

Population
  - Total: 19

Pariza is a hamlet and minor local entity located in the municipality of Condado de Treviño, in Burgos province, Castile and León, Spain. As of 2020, it has a population of 19.

== Geography ==
Pariza is located 113km east-northeast of Burgos.
