= San Vicentejo =

- Minor local entity
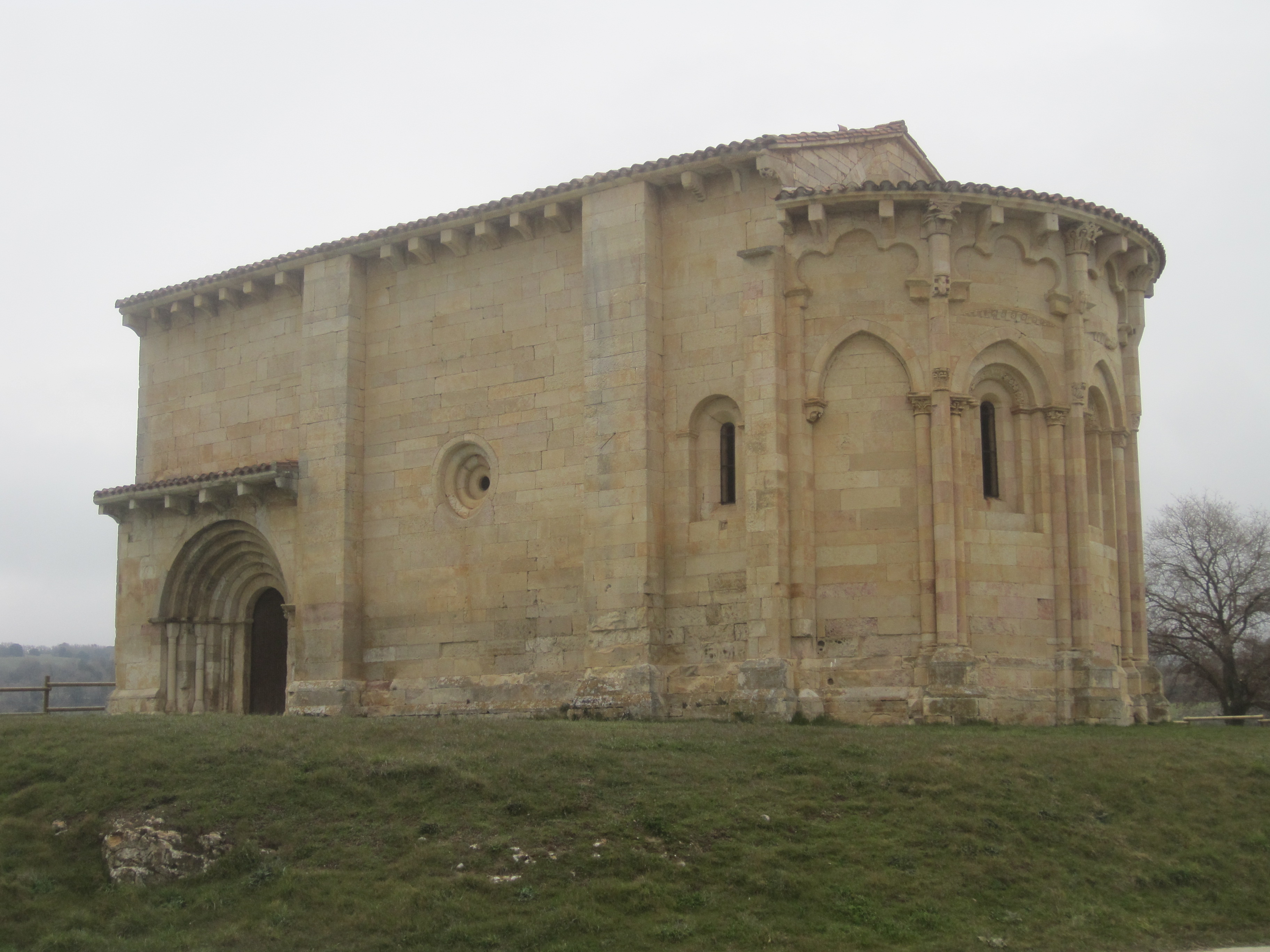

- Location within Province of Burgos Location within Castile and León Location within Spain
- Coordinates: 42°45′3″N 2°40′41″W
- Country: Spain
- Autonomous community: Castile and León
- Province: Province of Burgos
- Municipality: Condado de Treviño
- Elevation: 622 m (2,041 ft)

Population
  - Total: 4

San Vicentejo is a hamlet and minor local entity located in the municipality of Condado de Treviño, in Burgos province, Castile and León, Spain. As of 2020, it has a population of 4.

== Geography ==
San Vicentejo is located 107km east-northeast of Burgos.
