= Obécuri =

- Minor local entity
- Obecuri
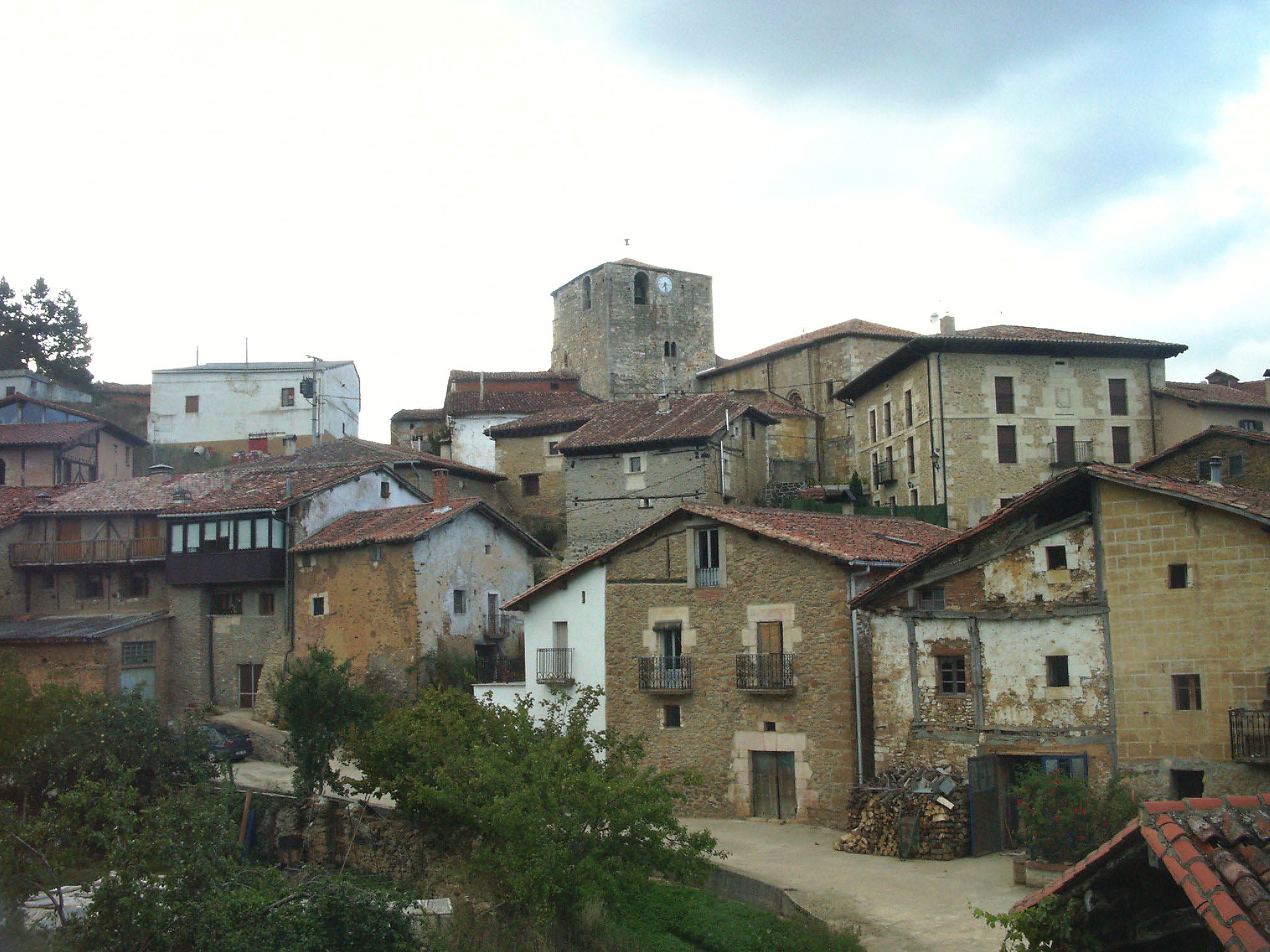

- Location within Province of Burgos Location within Castile and León Location within Spain
- Coordinates: 42°38′56″N 2°31′54″W
- Country: Spain
- Autonomous community: Castile and León
- Province: Province of Burgos
- Municipality: Condado de Treviño
- Elevation: 730 m (2,400 ft)

Population
  - Total: 16

Obécuri or Obecuri is a hamlet and minor local entity located in the municipality of Condado de Treviño, in Burgos province, Castile and León, Spain. As of 2020, it has a population of 16.

== Geography ==
Obécuri is located 124km east-northeast of Burgos.
