= Samiano =

- Minor local entity
- Location within Province of Burgos Location within Castile and León Location within Spain
- Coordinates: 42°41′31″N 2°39′53″W
- Country: Spain
- Autonomous community: Castile and León
- Province: Province of Burgos
- Municipality: Condado de Treviño
- Elevation: 592 m (1,942 ft)

Population
  - Total: 15

Samiano is a hamlet and minor local entity located in the municipality of Condado de Treviño, in Burgos province, Castile and León, Spain. As of 2020, it has a population of 15.

== Geography ==
Samiano is located 110km east-northeast of Burgos.
