= Burgueta =

- Minor local entity
- Location within Province of Burgos Location within Castile and León Location within Spain
- Coordinates: 42°44′24″N 2°50′42″W
- Country: Spain
- Autonomous community: Castile and León
- Province: Province of Burgos
- Municipality: Condado de Treviño
- Elevation: 534 m (1,752 ft)

Population
  - Total: 42

Burgueta is a hamlet and minor local entity located in the municipality of Condado de Treviño, in Burgos province, Castile and León, Spain. As of 2020, it has a population of 42.

== Geography ==
Burgueta is located 89km east-northeast of Burgos.
