= Villanueva Tobera =

- Minor local entity
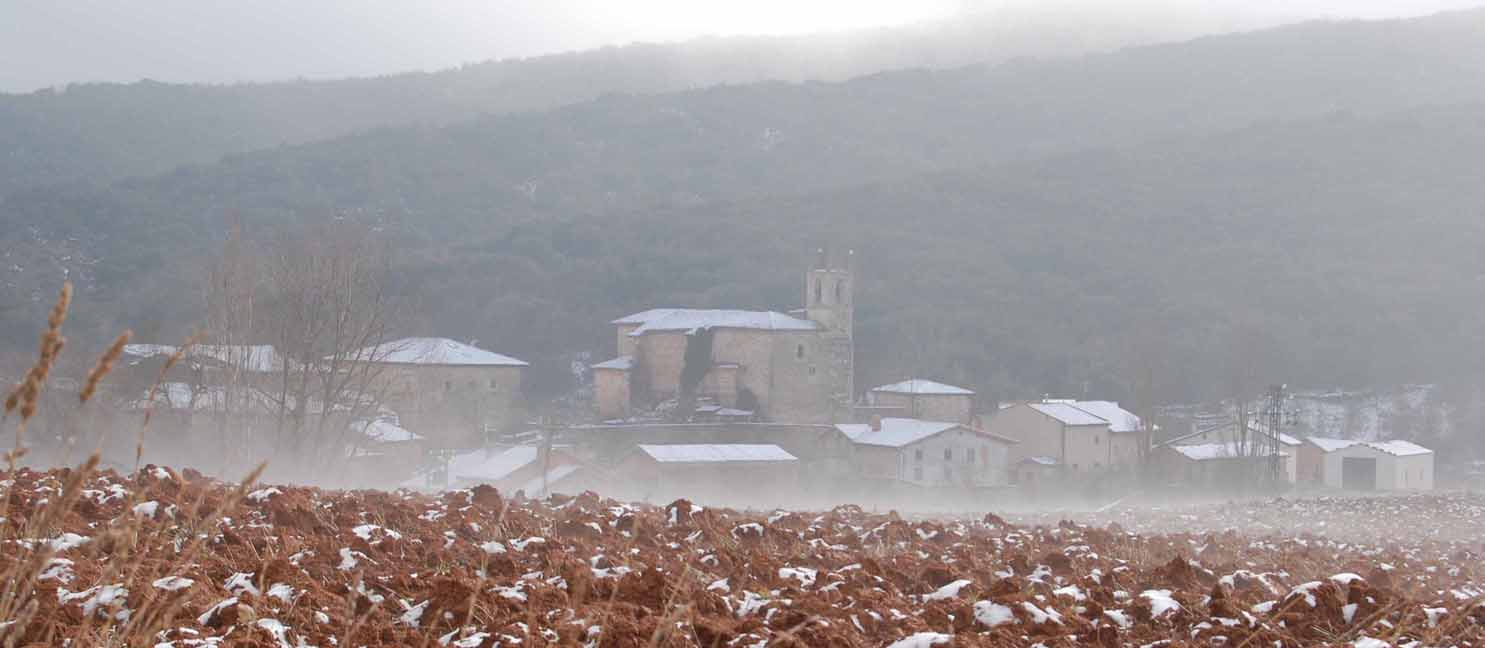

- Location within Province of Burgos Location within Castile and León Location within Spain
- Coordinates: 42°41′12″N 2°45′57″W
- Country: Spain
- Autonomous community: Castile and León
- Province: Province of Burgos
- Municipality: Condado de Treviño
- Elevation: 575 m (1,886 ft)

Population
  - Total: 11

Villanueva Tobera is a hamlet and minor local entity located in the municipality of Condado de Treviño, in Burgos province, Castile and León, Spain. As of 2020, it has a population of 11.

== Geography ==
Villanueva Tobera is located 99km east-northeast of Burgos.
