= Franco (Treviño) =

- Minor local entity
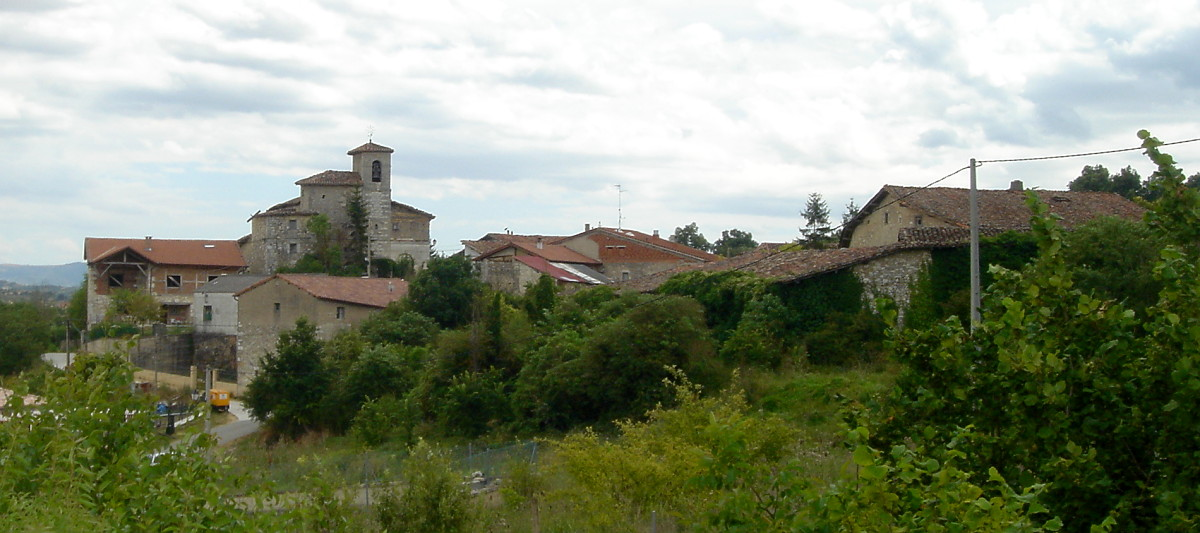

- Location within Province of Burgos Location within Castile and León Location within Spain
- Coordinates: 42°43′19″N 2°42′40″W
- Country: Spain
- Autonomous community: Castile and León
- Province: Province of Burgos
- Municipality: Condado de Treviño
- Elevation: 557 m (1,827 ft)

Population
  - Total: 66

Franco is a hamlet and minor local entity located in the municipality of Condado de Treviño, in Burgos province, Castile and León, Spain. As of 2020, it has a population of 66.

== Geography ==
Franco is located 104 kilometres (65 mi) east-northeast of Burgos.
