= Doroño =

- Minor local entity
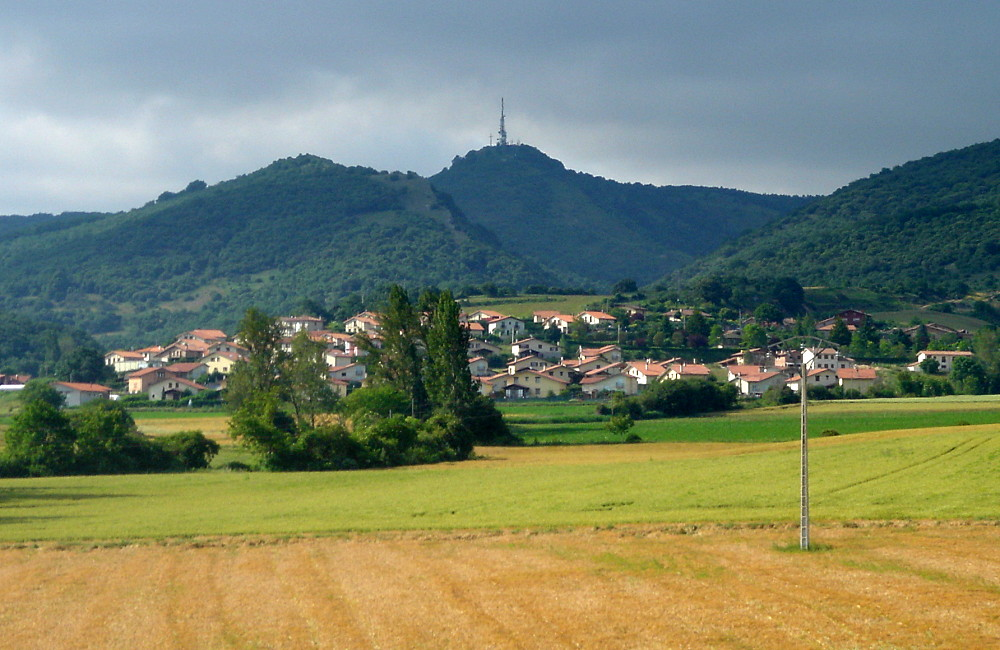

- Location within Province of Burgos Location within Castile and León Location within Spain
- Coordinates: 42°46′39″N 2°43′41″W
- Country: Spain
- Autonomous community: Castile and León
- Province: Province of Burgos
- Municipality: Condado de Treviño
- Elevation: 682 m (2,238 ft)

Population
  - Total: 150

Doroño is a village and minor local entity located in the municipality of Condado de Treviño, in Burgos province, Castile and León, Spain. As of 2020, it has a population of 150.

== Geography ==
Doroño is located 106km east-northeast of Burgos.
