= Fuidio =

- Minor local entity
- Location within Province of Burgos Location within Castile and León Location within Spain
- Coordinates: 42°41′32″N 2°38′59″W
- Country: Spain
- Autonomous community: Castile and León
- Province: Province of Burgos
- Municipality: Condado de Treviño
- Elevation: 585 m (1,919 ft)

Population
  - Total: 26

Fuidio is a hamlet and minor local entity located in the municipality of Condado de Treviño, in Burgos province, Castile and León, Spain. As of 2020, it has a population of 26.

== Geography ==
Fuidio is located 111km east-northeast of Burgos.
