= Ogueta, Spain =

Ogueta
- Minor local entity
- Location within Province of Burgos Location within Castile and León Location within Spain
- Coordinates: 42°42′45″N 2°38′43″W
- Country: Spain
- Autonomous community: Castile and León
- Province: Province of Burgos
- Municipality: Condado de Treviño
- Elevation: 614 m (2,014 ft)

Population
  - Total: 6

Ogueta is a hamlet and minor local entity located in the municipality of Condado de Treviño, in Burgos province, Castile and León, Spain. As of 2020, it has a population of 6.

== Geography ==
Ogueta is located 110km east-northeast of Burgos.
