= Grandival =

- Minor local entity
- Location within Province of Burgos Location within Castile and León Location within Spain
- Coordinates: 42°42′52″N 2°47′4″W
- Country: Spain
- Autonomous community: Castile and León
- Province: Province of Burgos
- Municipality: Condado de Treviño
- Elevation: 574 m (1,883 ft)

Population
  - Total: 24

Grandival is a hamlet and minor local entity located in the municipality of Condado de Treviño, in Burgos province, Castile and León, Spain. As of 2020, it has a population of 24.

== Geography ==
Grandival is located 100km east-northeast of Burgos.
