= Añastro =

- Minor local entity
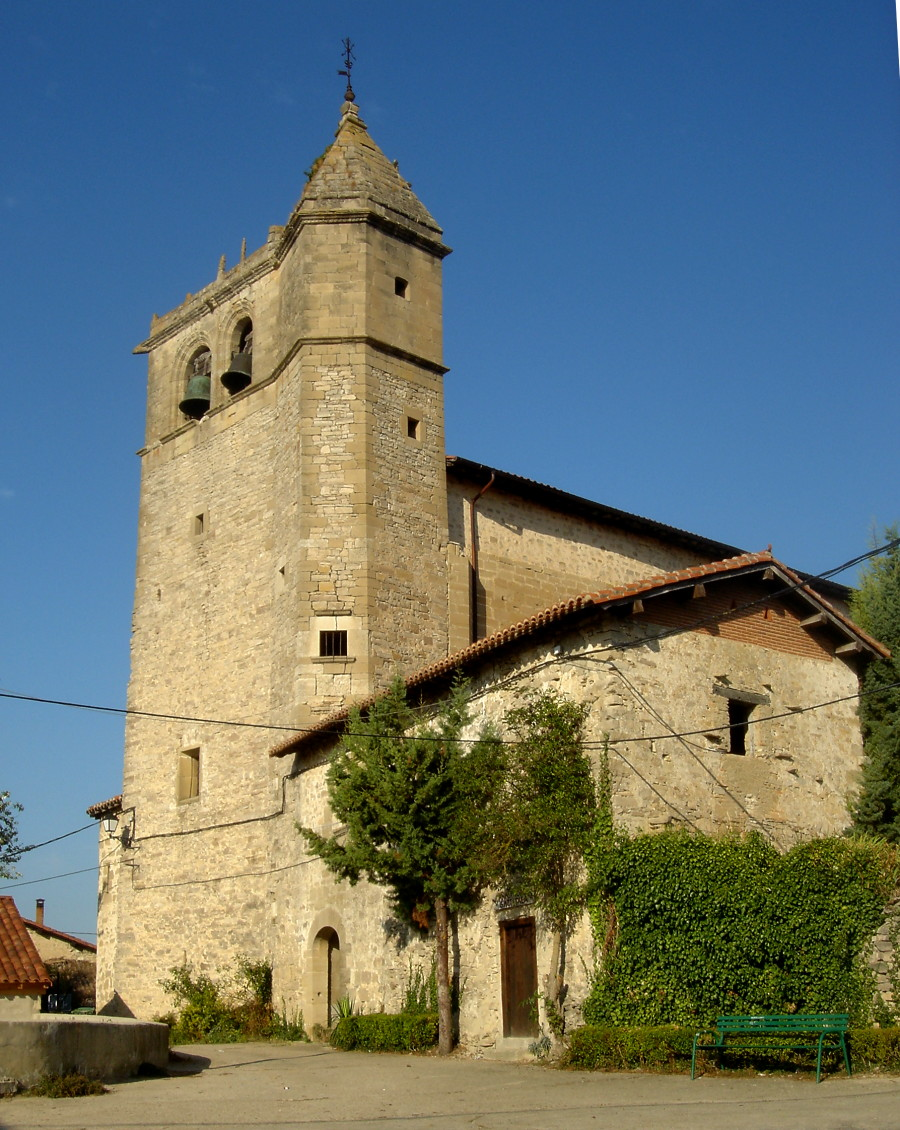

- Location within Province of Burgos Location within Castile and León Location within Spain
- Coordinates: 42°44′28″N 2°47′24″W
- Country: Spain
- Autonomous community: Castile and León
- Province: Province of Burgos
- Municipality: Condado de Treviño
- Elevation: 584 m (1,916 ft)

Population
  - Total: 104

Añastro is a village and minor local entity located in the municipality of Condado de Treviño, in Burgos province, Castile and León, Spain. As of 2020, it has a population of 104.

== Geography ==
Añastro is located 96km east-northeast of Burgos.
