= Armentia (Burgos) =

- Minor local entity
- Armentía
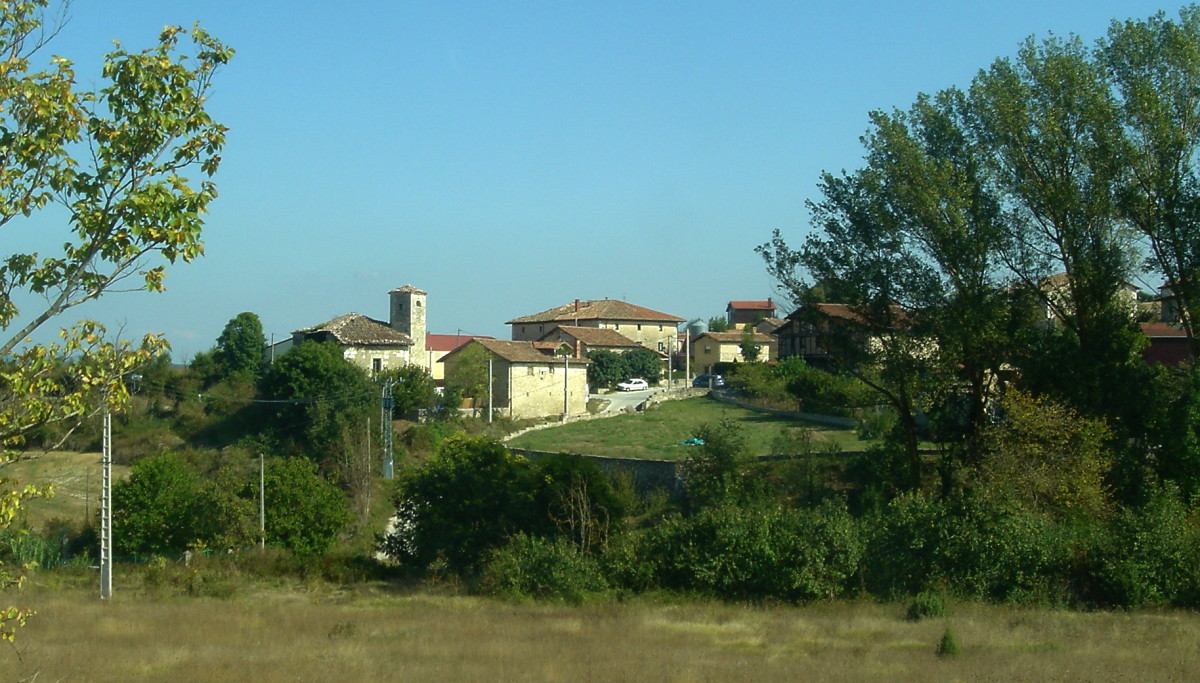

- Location within Province of Burgos Location within Castile and León Location within Spain
- Coordinates: 42°42′52″N 2°42′12″W
- Country: Spain
- Autonomous community: Castile and León
- Province: Province of Burgos
- Municipality: Condado de Treviño
- Elevation: 603 m (1,978 ft)

Population
  - Total: 129

Armentia or Armentía is a village and minor local entity located in the municipality of Condado de Treviño, in Burgos province, Castile and León, Spain. As of 2020, it has a population of 129.

== Geography ==
Armentia is located 106km east-northeast of Burgos.
