= Bajauri (Burgos) =

- Minor local entity
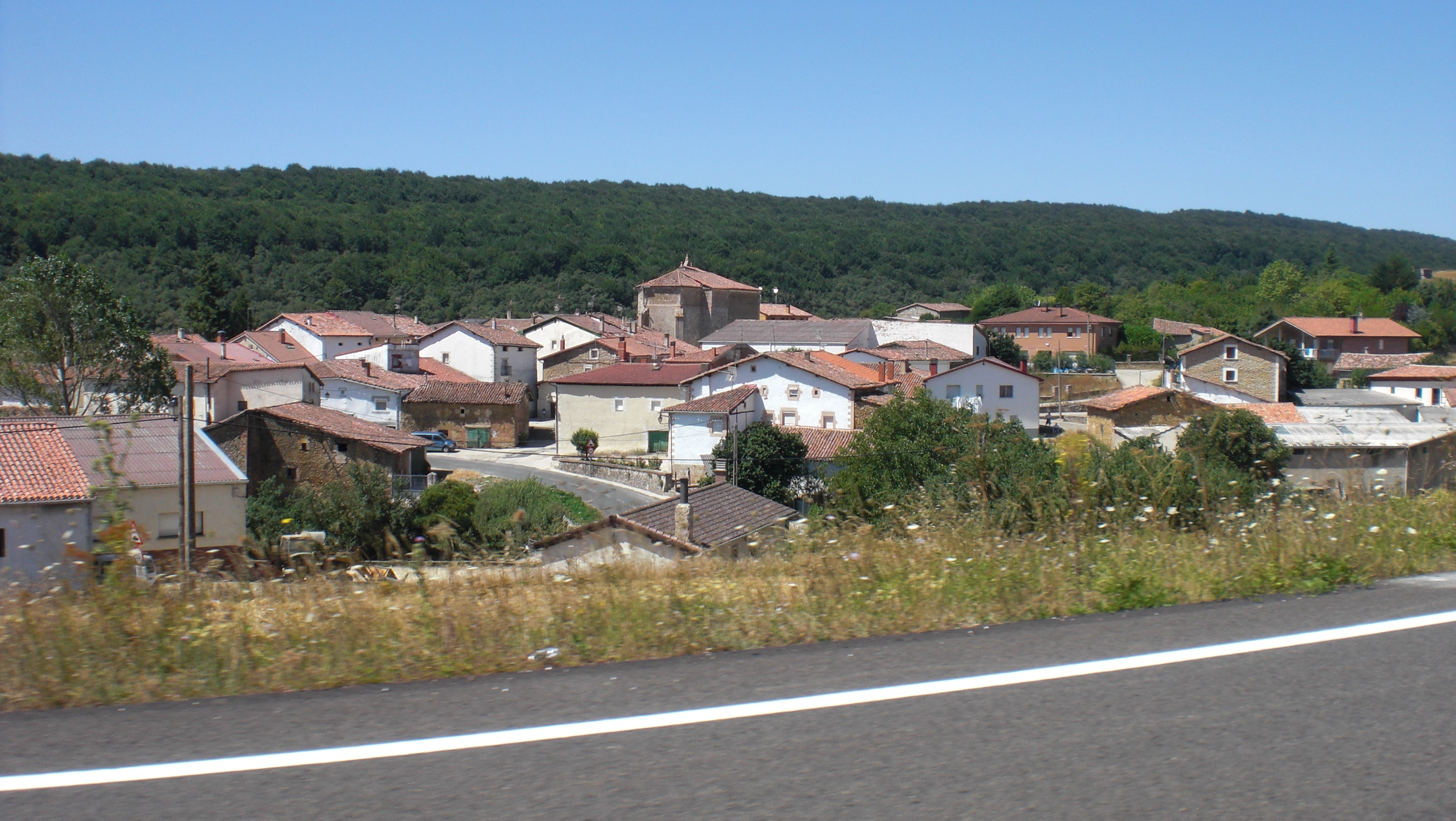

- Location within Province of Burgos Location within Castile and León Location within Spain
- Coordinates: 42°39′10″N 2°34′6″W
- Country: Spain
- Autonomous community: Castile and León
- Province: Province of Burgos
- Municipality: Condado de Treviño
- Elevation: 787 m (2,582 ft)

Population
  - Total: 19

Bajauri is a hamlet and minor local entity located in the municipality of Condado de Treviño within the Treviño enclave, an exclave of the province of Burgos, Castile and León, Spain.

The name is of Basque origin. The settlement has a 1000 year history, having been recorded in the Becerro Galicano by the monks of San Millan who came here to collect taxes. As of 2020, it had a population of 19.

== Geography ==
Bajauri is located 121km east-northeast of Burgos.
