= Imiruri =

- Minor local entity
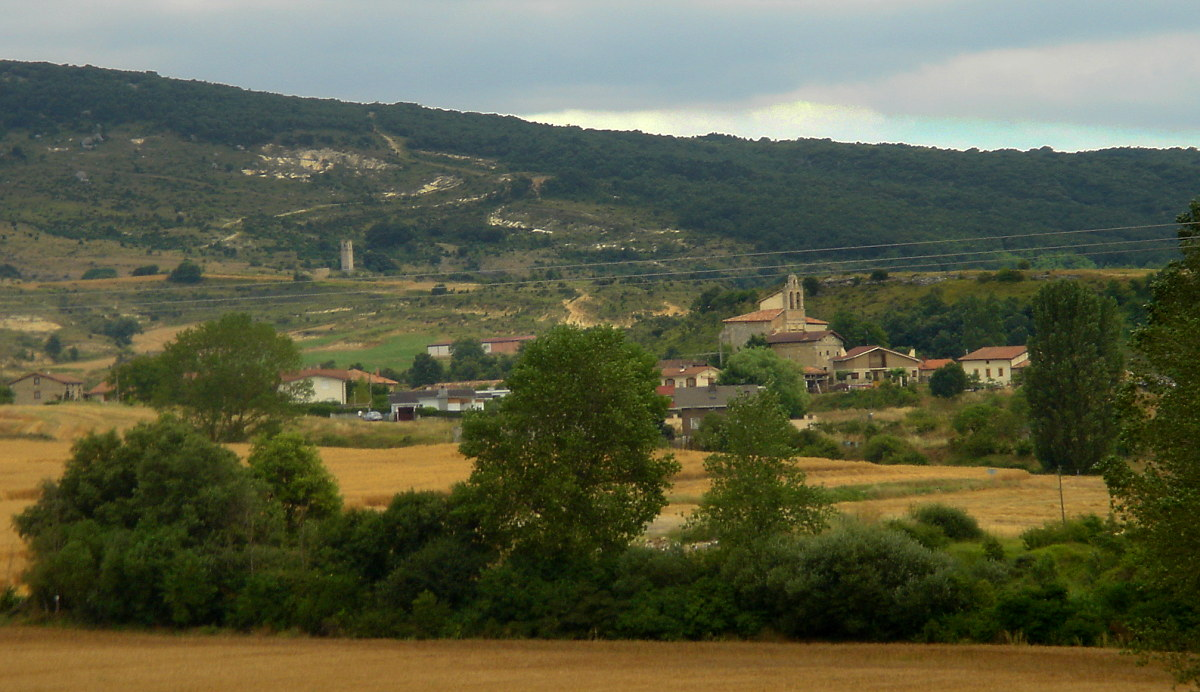

- Location within Province of Burgos Location within Castile and León Location within Spain
- Coordinates: 42°44′39″N 2°40′32″W
- Country: Spain
- Autonomous community: Castile and León
- Province: Province of Burgos
- Municipality: Condado de Treviño
- Elevation: 602 m (1,975 ft)

Population
  - Total: 28

Imiruri is a hamlet and minor local entity located in the municipality of Condado de Treviño, in Burgos province, Castile and León, Spain. As of 2020, it has a population of 28.

The church is dedicated to Saint Roman.

== Geography ==
Imiruri is located 108km east-northeast of Burgos.
