= Mountains of Miranda de Ebro and Ameyugo =

Special area of conservation in Spain

Coordinates: 42°38′25″N 2°57′16″W

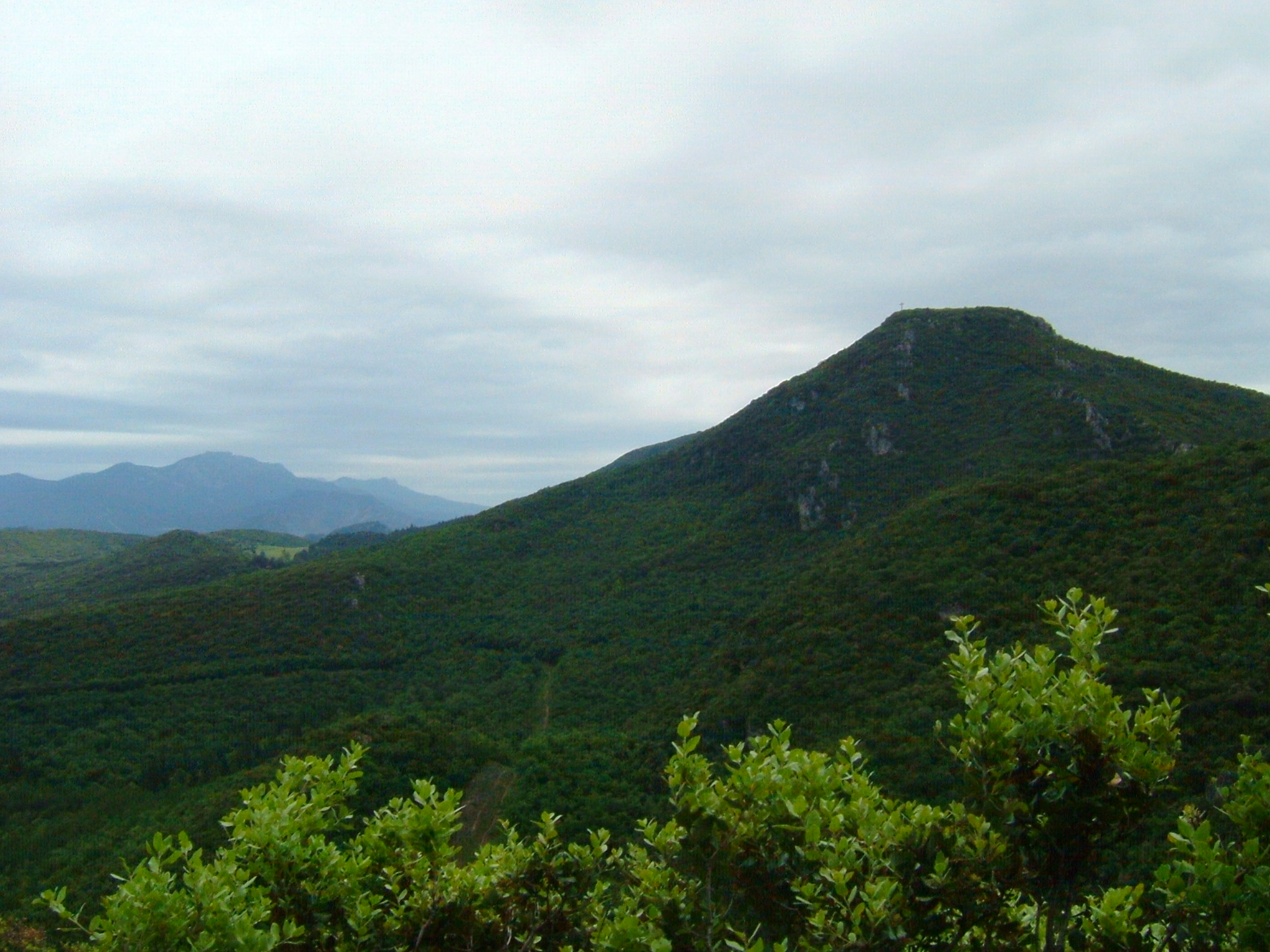
Cruz de Motrico Mountain in the Obarenes Mountains

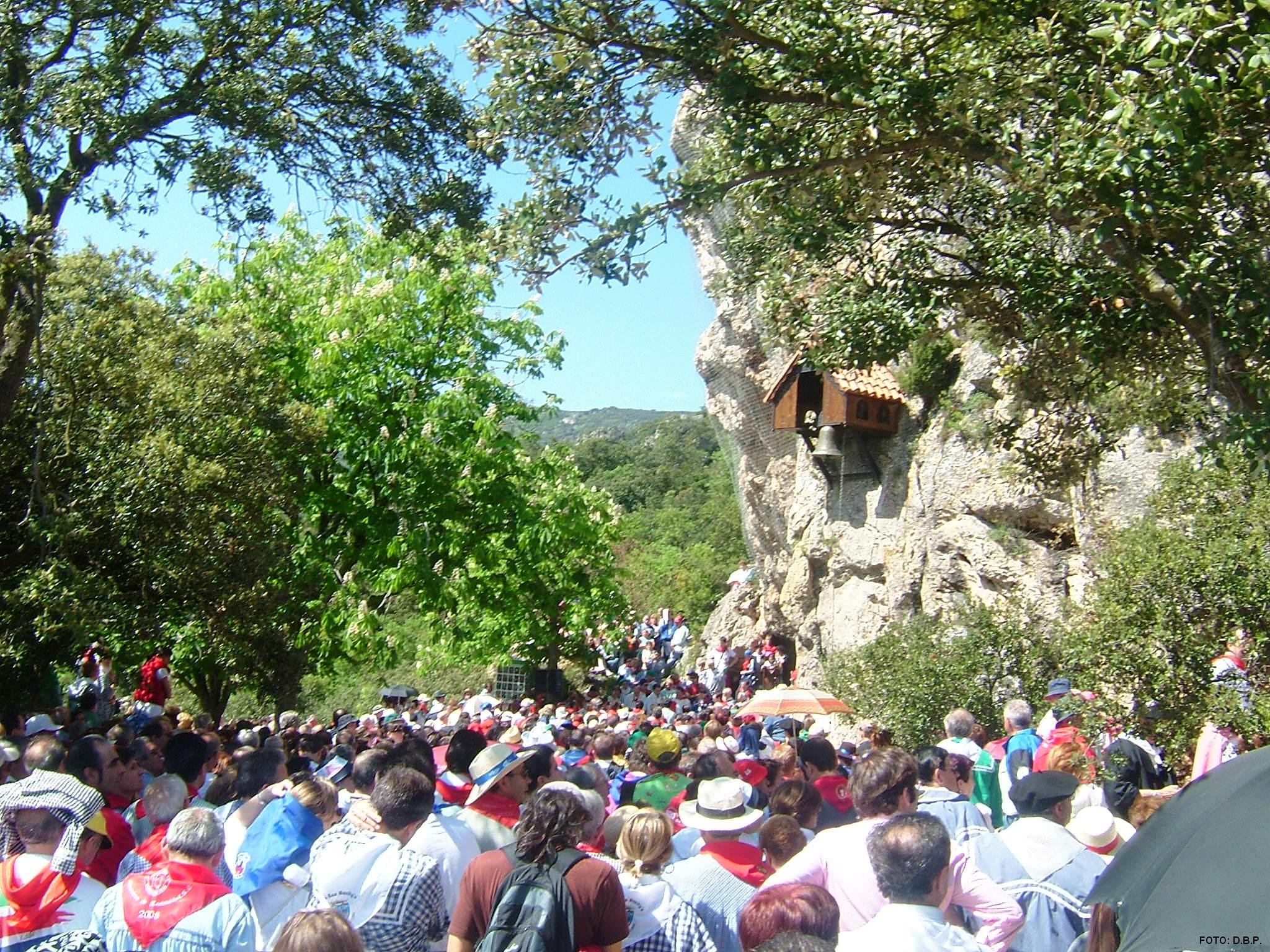
Mass in the chapel of San Juan del Monte

The Mountains of Miranda de Ebro and Ameyugo, commonly known as Monte de Miranda or Monte de San Juan, are a Special Area of Conservation (SAC) in Spain, in the eastern part of Burgos province, bordering with Álava and La Rioja. Geographically, they belong to the Comarca del Ebro and are located at the easternmost end of the Obarenes Mountains and south of the city of Miranda de Ebro. The Saint John of the Mountain Festival is held here every year.

== Characteristics ==
- Natura 2000 code:

SPA: ES4120095
SAC: ES4120095

- Climate: Continental Mediterranean
- Area: 3.633,03 ha.
- Altitude:

Minimum: -
Average: 678 m
Maximum: ± 1000 m

The mountains have an average altitude of 678 meters above sea level. The highest areas present escarpments and reach, in certain points, around 1,000 meters above sea level. The affected population centers are Ameyugo, Bugedo, Miranda de Ebro, and Pancorbo.

The greatest risk and vulnerability factors in the Mountains of Miranda de Ebro and Ameyugo are the risks of forest fires, urban development pressure and public-use pressure, and the installation of wind farms, such as the Burgos wind farms.

=== Natural Area for Recreation ===
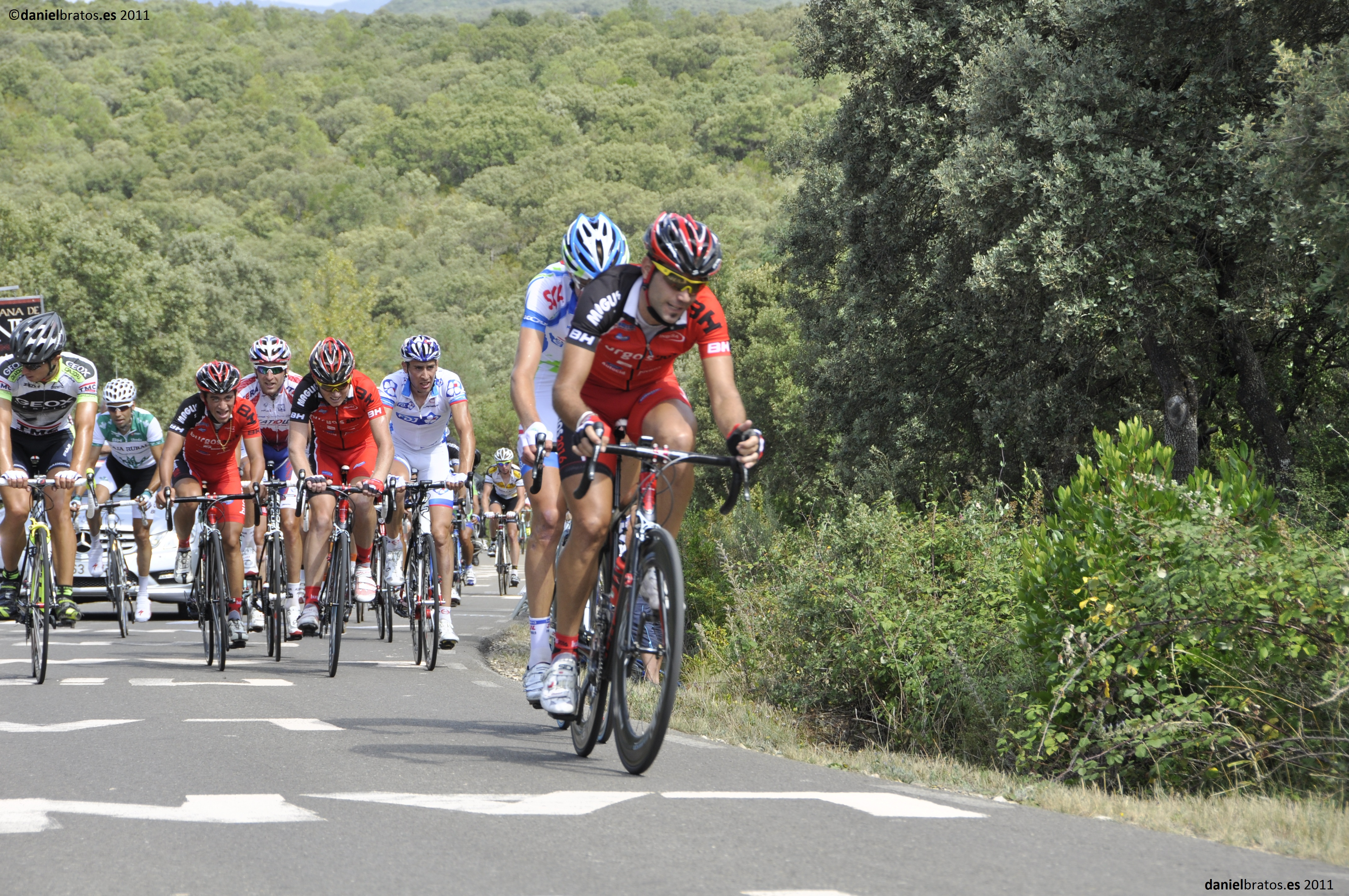
Peloton of cyclists climbing to the peak of the Monte de San Juan in Miranda de Ebro during the 2011 Vuelta a Burgos race

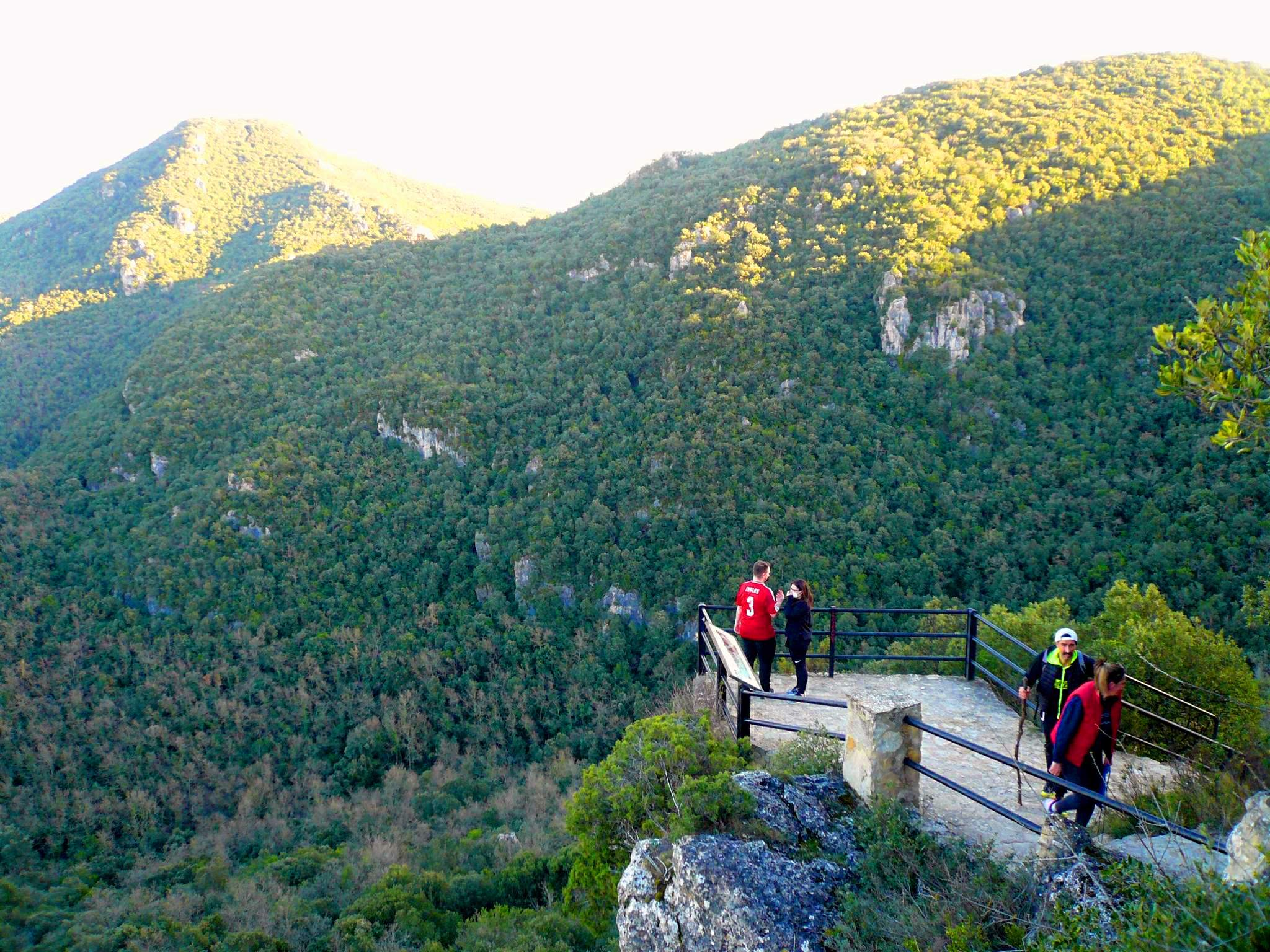
The Cross of Motrico seen from the chapel of San Juan del Monte

The landscape of the Mountains of Miranda de Ebro and Ameyugo covers a vast expanse of approximately 3,600 hectares, although only a small part has been declared a zona natural de esparcimiento. (Note: English: Natural area for recreation) It is in this area where the Saint John of the Mountain Festival takes place and where there are numerous huts to provide shelter to groups on the Monday of Pentecost. In addition, there are various public facilities here, such as parking lots, drinking fountains, toilets, children's playgrounds, etc.

The Monte de Miranda is the main natural leisure area available to the people of Miranda de Ebro during the year. It is not uncommon to see people practicing sports such as hiking or cycling. In fact, the climb to the peak of San Juan del Monte is one of the usual final stages during the Vuelta a Burgos race. The rear access road is a short third category pass in which the last ramps exceed 9% on average and with maximums of 14%.

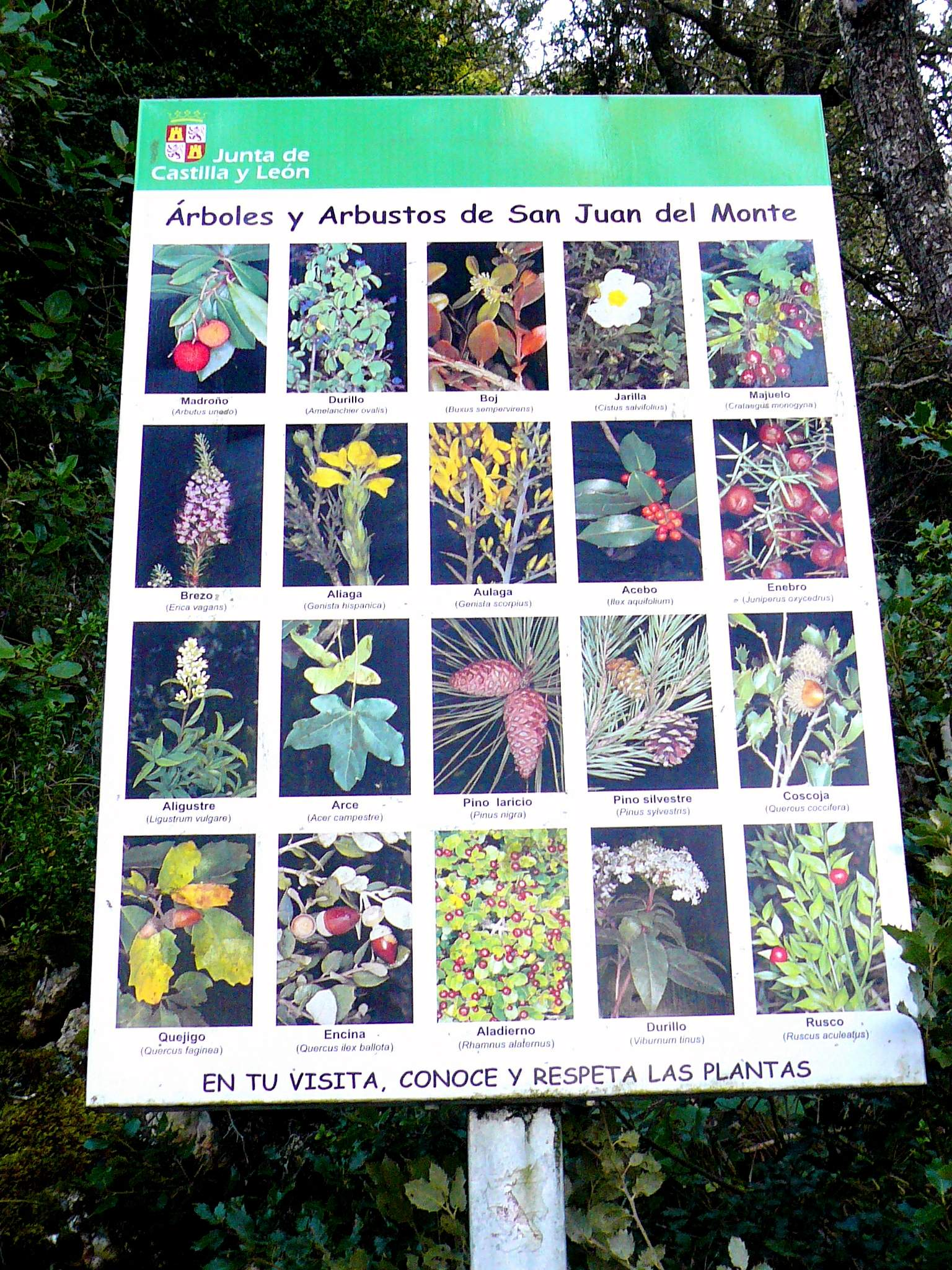
Informative poster of the plant species in the Monte de San Juan

=== Flora ===
The high-altitude vegetation is composed of grasslands and oak groves. In the middle zone of the mountainous elevations there are abundant shrubby and wooded areas with bushes, oakwood, evergreen oak forests, and pine groves. This remains constant until one reaches the Ebro Valley.

Downstream from Miranda de Ebro to the provincial boundary with Álava and La Rioja, there are still some fairly well preserved gallery forests. Rivers and streams have created deep ravines, while in the rich lowland area of the Ebro river there are crops and orchards.

The area is in an exceptional state of conservation with sabinares (Note: English: juniper forests) of Phoenicean juniper (Juniperus phoenicea) as well as boxwood (Buxus sempervirens).

=== Fauna ===
There were 159 pairs of Eurasian griffon vulture (Gyps fulvus) in 2005. Moreover, this is one of the few places in Castile and León where Bonelli's Eagles (Aquila fasciata) are present, with two pairs in 2005.

== See also ==
- Geography of Miranda de Ebro
- Miranda de Ebro
- Comarca del Ebro
- Special Area of Conservation

== Bibliography ==
- Balcells Rocamora, Enrique (1966). La vegetación del valle del Ebro y de la vertiente española (Report). Centro Pirenaico de Biología Experimental. hdl:10261/109894.
- Sutanto, Samuel; Madruga de Brito, Mariana; Janssen, Matthijs; del Pozo Garcia, Maria (12 February 2024). The cascading effect of wildfires on flood risk: a study case in Ebro River basin Spain (PDF) (Report). EGUsphere, European Geosciences Union. doi:10.5194/egusphere-2024-153.
