= Geography of Miranda de Ebro =

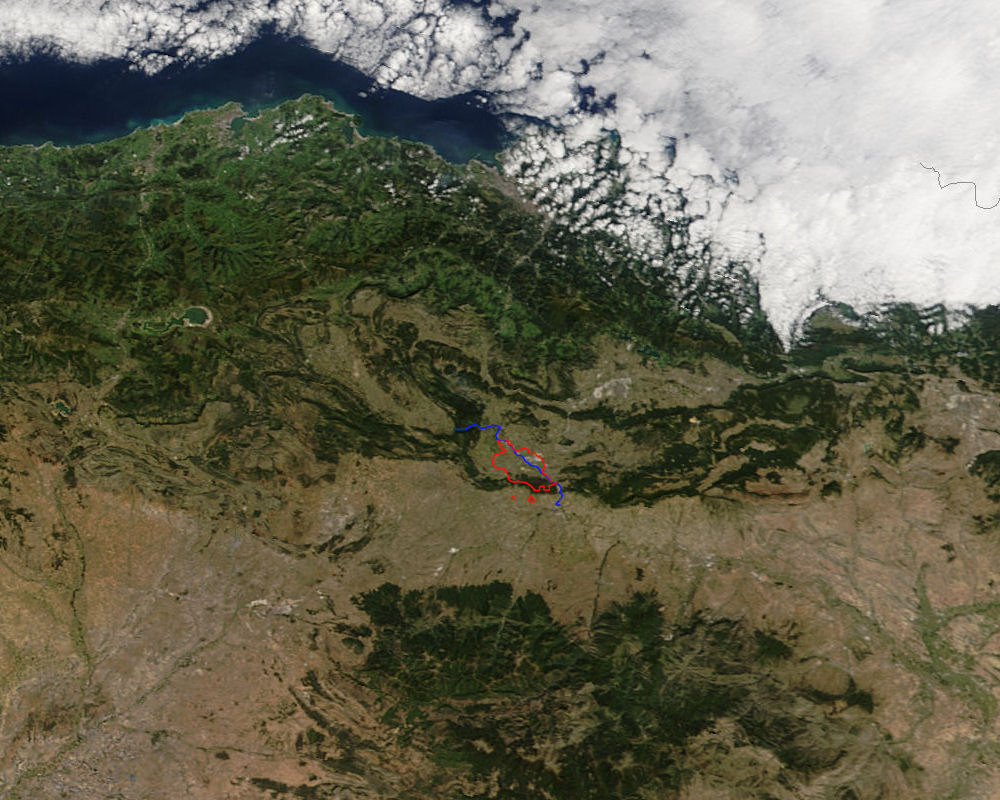
Satellite view of the municipality of Miranda de Ebro (red) and the course of the Ebro river through it (blue).

The geography of Miranda de Ebro has a very particular geographic-ecological aspect. The municipality of Miranda de Ebro is located between the two great bio-geographical fringes of Europe, the Eurosiberian (humidity, cold, beech forests, oak forests,...) and the Mediterranean (dry summers, mild winters, evergreen forests,...), providing it with an extraordinary biological diversity.

== Physical environment ==
=== Location ===
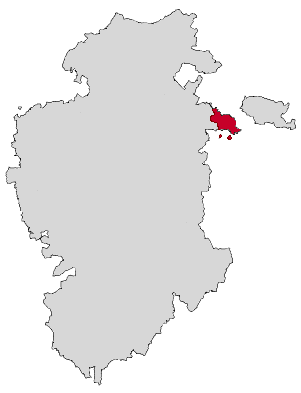
Location of Miranda de Ebro in the province of Burgos (Spain).

The city of Miranda de Ebro is located in the northeast of the province of Burgos, 80 km from the capital, in the autonomous community of Castile and León (Castilla y León, Spain). It belongs to the Comarca del Ebro of the province of Burgos. The coordinates of the city are in latitude: 42º 41' 6" N and in longitude: 2º 55' 60" W. It has an area of 101.33 km^{2}, a perimeter of 72312 meters and is located 471 meters above sea level according to the National Geographic Institute and 462.09 according to a plaque located on the Carlos III Bridge.

It is limited to the north and east by the province of Alava, to the south by La Rioja and to the west it is united with the rest of the province through the Obarenes Mountains, a mountain chain that closes practically three quarters of the area, since it also penetrates into the autonomous communities bordering Miranda de Ebro. The municipality has two enclaves in La Rioja territory: Sajuela and El Ternero. The municipality has two SCIs: Mountains of Miranda de Ebro and Ameyugo and the riverbanks of the Ebro. In addition, the municipality is crossed by a long-distance walking trail: the GR-99.

Within a radius of only 80 km are the cities of Bilbao, Burgos, Logroño and Vitoria.

=== Hydrography ===
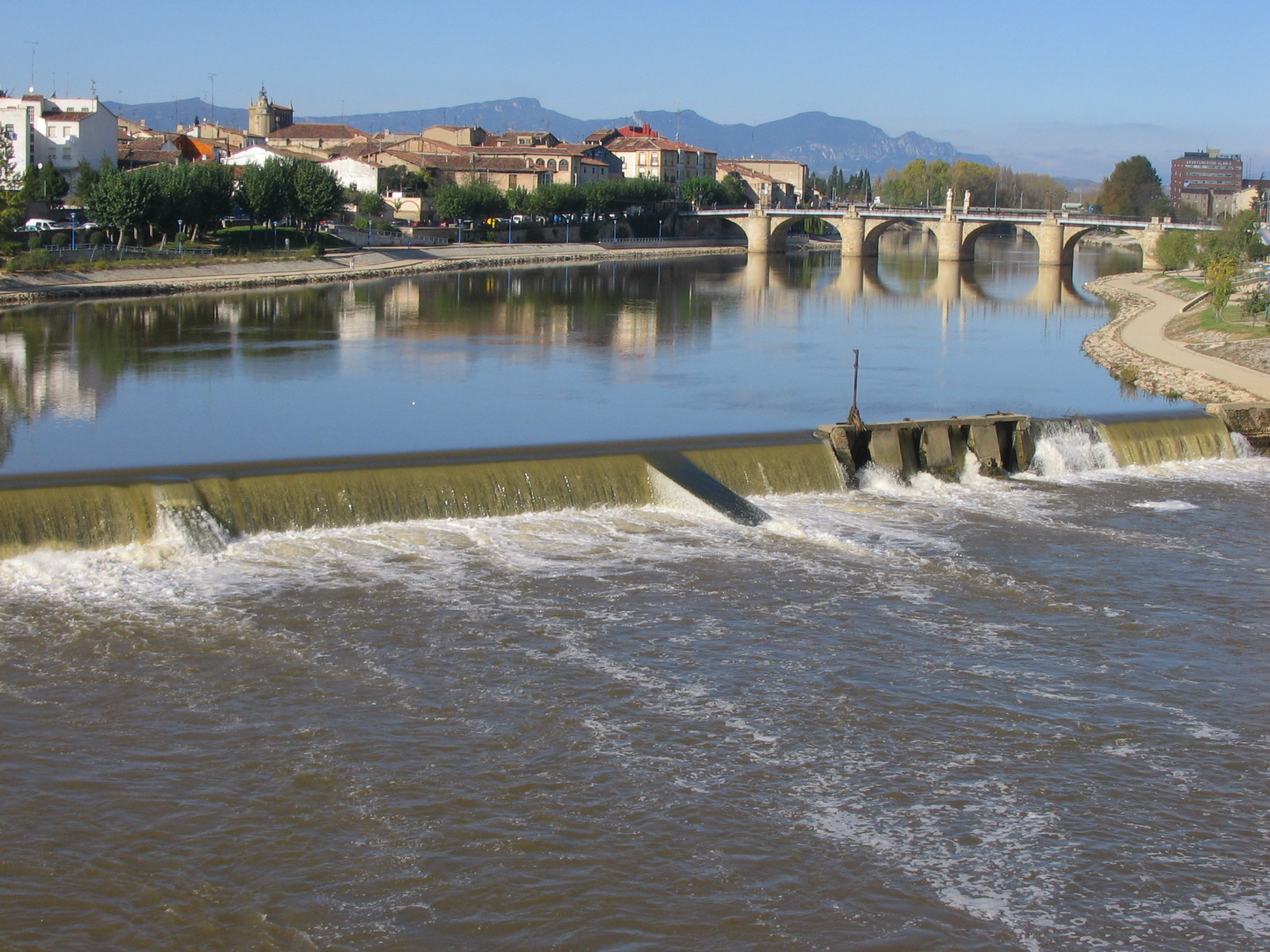
The Ebro is the main river in the Miranda de Ebro region.

The locality is crossed by the Ebro River, which divides the city into two well-differentiated zones according to their historical antiquity: the historical center or Aquende (right shore) and the modern part or Allende (left shore). The average water level in the center of the urban center is one meter deep. In addition, other affluents of the Ebro flow into the municipality, such as the Bayas River and the Zadorra River on the left bank and the Oroncillo River on the right bank.

The area is full of subway rivers and aquifers; in fact, the water supply of the city is possible due to the extractions in the aquifers of Valverde and La Calera. Years ago there were also a multitude of ponds and lakes that were disappearing, but have been recovered, such as El Lago in the east of the municipality.

Although it is not frequent, it is possible that abnormal rain or snow conditions may cause floods. The last flood occurred on June 1-2, 2008, when the flow of the Ebro River passed through the center of the city and reached 1101 m³/s and its level registered 5.31 meters. Previously, there was another flood on February 5, 2003, when the flow reached 1440 m³, i.e., its level reached 6.35 meters.

Within the municipality there are two hydroelectric power plants that use water from the Ebro River to generate energy. The first of these is the Cabriana hydroelectric plant, which began operating in 1922. It takes water through a channel 8 meters wide and 7 meters deep. The other plant is located in the town center and its dimensions are narrower than the previous one.

The Ebro, the city's main river, currently offers a variety of leisure activities. It is common to see sportspeople practicing canoeing in the urban part of the river. Fishing is also allowed under license, although it is not recommended for sanitary reasons.

=== Orography ===
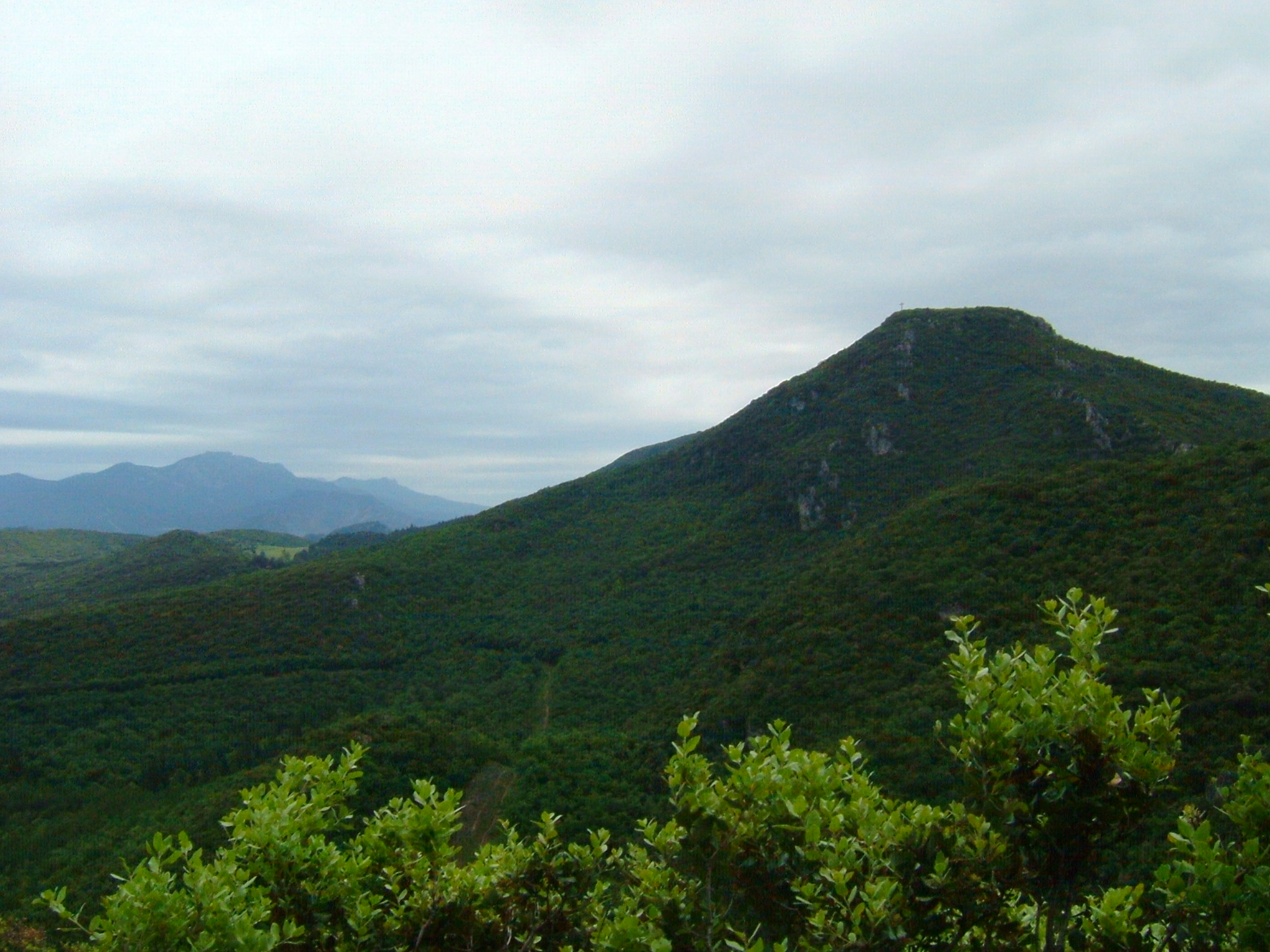
Main elevations of Miranda de Ebro
Cruz de Motrico in the south of the city.
Name	MAMSL
Parada Vieja	867
Cruz de Motrico	851
Peña Escalera	812
Gobera	748
Peaks in La Rioja limiting with Miranda de Ebro	MAMSL
Peñalrayo	954
La Muela	931
Monte Fuerte	927
Source: Mendikat

Miranda de Ebro is located in a plain, surrounded by a mountain range belonging to the Obarenes Mountains, with a natural exit through the Pancorbo gorge to the west towards Burgos; Conchas de Haro to the southeast facing La Rioja and the gorge of La Puebla de Arganzón to the northeast towards the Basque Country.

The Monte de Miranda (popularly called San Juan del Monte) has an average altitude of 678 meters above sea level. The highest areas have escarpments and reach, at certain points near Pancorbo, about 1000 meters of altitude. In the middle of the plain there are small elevations such as La Picota hill, which rises to about 500 meters above sea level, or Monte de los Frailes.

The lithology of Miranda de Ebro is largely composed of clayey soils, limestones and sandstones formed in the Oligocene (Pancorbo area) and in the Cretaceous (Sobrón area). For this reason, quarries and gravel pits are very common in the surroundings of Miranda de Ebro. The mountain of Toloño and Peñacerrada is located near the city, in the lands of La Rioja and Alava, and its origins are volcanic. Among the different heights surrounding the city stand out the Cruz de Motrico, Gobera and Peña Escalera in the Obarenes Mountains.

Outside the municipality, although a few meters from the provincial border between Burgos and La Rioja and within the mountain range of the Montes de Miranda, there are other elevations that exceed the previous ones, such as Peñalrayo (954 meters above sea level) or La Muela (931 meters above sea level).

== Natural environment ==
=== Flora ===
The vegetation of the municipality of Miranda de Ebro is found in large forest masses of Mediterranean mount, with the holm oak (Quercus ilex) as the main characteristic among the trees, the boxwood (Buxus sempervirens) and the strawberry tree (Arbutus) among the bushes.

In humid areas, northern and shady lands, there are other types of plants such as oaks, beeches or pines. In well irrigated areas such as the banks of rivers and streams there are abundant groves of willows (Salix) and poplars (Populus).

In the valleys there are meadows and pastures that seem to be covered by shrubby plants such as heather. In the strips between the banks and the mountain areas, the land is usually cultivated with cereals, beets, potatoes and orchards.

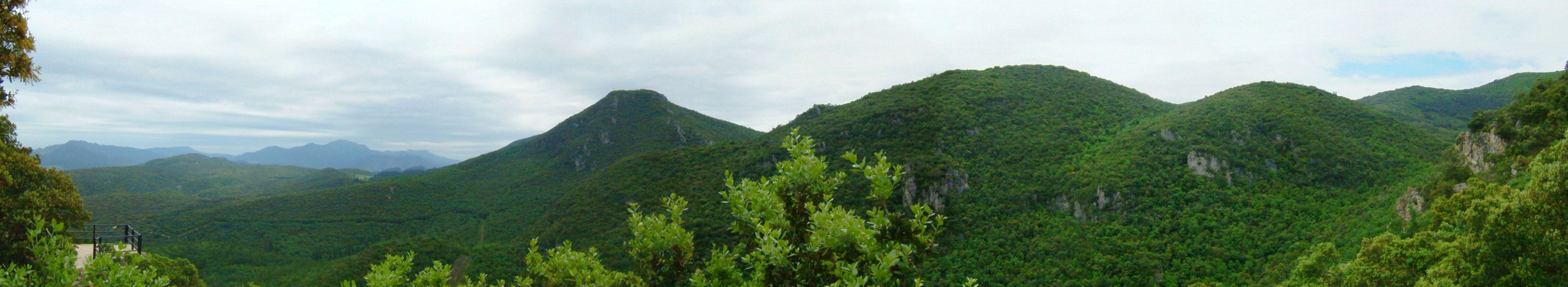
Panoramic view of the Miranda Mountains where forest areas are abundant.

=== Fauna ===
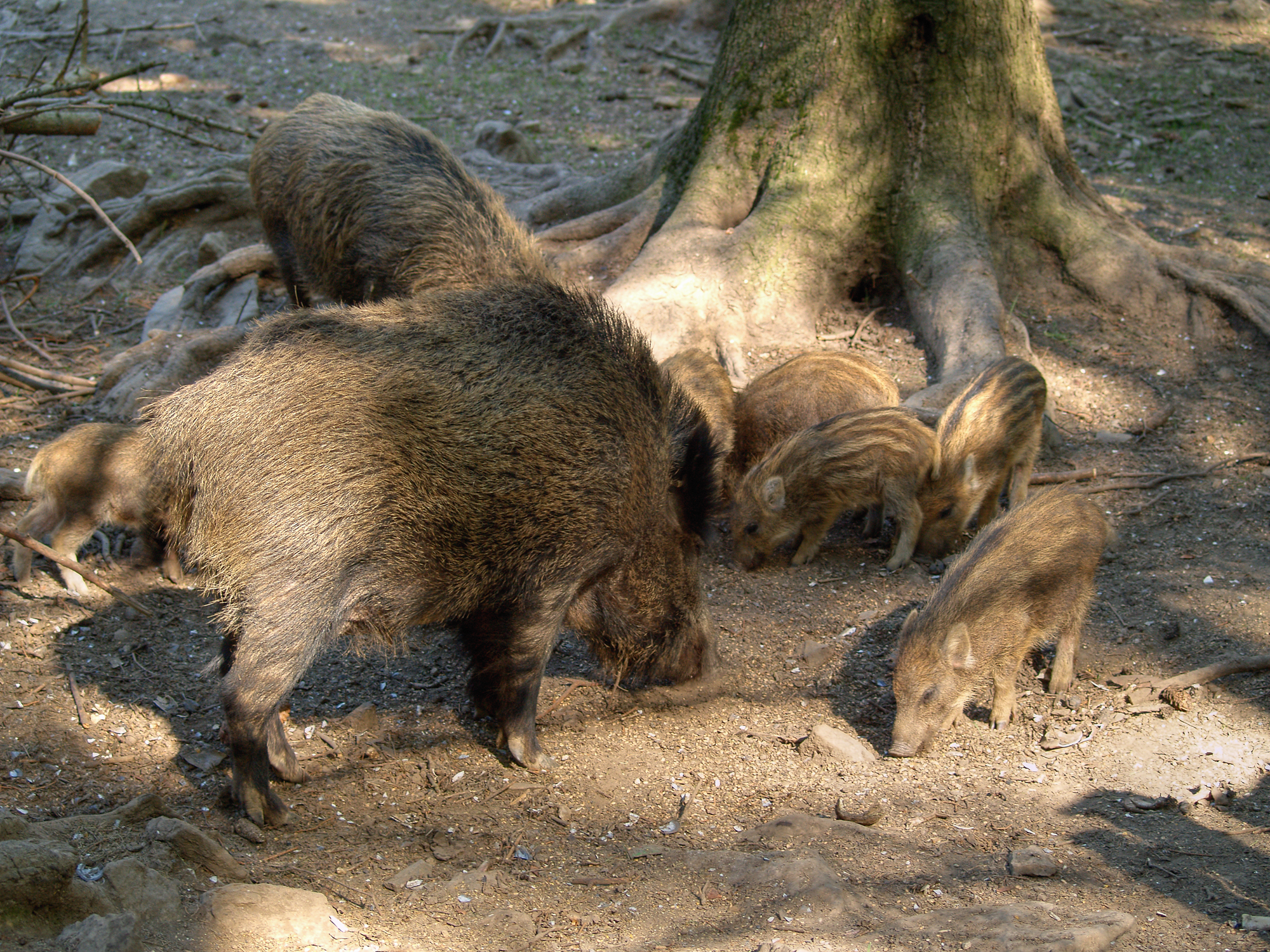
Wild boar is one of the most common species in the comarca.

The species of vertebrate animals in the municipality of Miranda de Ebro is very wide. Among the birds, raptors such as the golden eagle, Bonelli's eagle, griffon vulture, eagle owl or owl stand out. There are also dozens of smaller birds such as blackbirds, linnets, oropendolas, and others. Among the migratory birds, wood pigeons, storks, quails, finches and countless other species are common. The griffon vulture population in the mountains of Miranda de Ebro and Ameyugo stands out with 159 pairs in 2005 and has international importance. It is one of the few places in Castile and León where the Bonelli's eagle appears (two pairs in 2005). This is the reason why the Miranda de Ebro area is included in the Natura 2000 network and is a special protection area for birds.

In the riverside areas or wetlands, the passage of grey herons, cranes and geese is very frequent. Many of these animals are found all year round under the protection of human care (peacocks, geese, swans and cormorants were introduced on the urban banks of the Ebro). Under water, some of the most common species are trout, bass and barbel.

In the forest areas, roe deer, wild boar, foxes, genets and wildcats are the most common species. There is also a large population of small vertebrates such as moles, mice and shrews.

Among the amphibians and reptiles, the species includes newts, frogs, toads, lizards, geckos, water snakes, collared snakes, and more.

== Weather ==
The weather in Miranda de Ebro is continentalized Mediterranean and is influenced by industrial conditions. Winters are cold, with very frequent frosts and fogs, while snowfalls are more and more occasional but heavy. Average minimum temperatures range from 3 °C to 6 °C. Summer is hot, but not as hot as on the plateau. The average maximum temperatures range between 18 °C and 22 °C. The drought period is usually about two months. The average annual temperatures range between 7 °C and 17 °C.

Precipitation is regularly distributed throughout the year, although there is a drop in precipitation around summer and a high peak in autumn and spring. Average annual precipitation is around 569.1 mm or 521 mm, according to the sources. The predominant wind in Miranda de Ebro is from the north and northwest, following the course of the Ebro River.

Average climatic parameters of Miranda de Ebro
Month	Jan	Feb	Mar	Apr	May	Jun	Jul	Aug	Sep	Oct	Nov	Dec	Year
Maximum average temperature (°C)	8	10	14	15	19	23	25	26	23	18	12	9	16'8
Minimum average temperature (°C)	2	2	4	5	8	10	13	13	11	8	5	3	7
Rainfall (mm)	51	41	37	58	45	31	30	25	31	52	66	54	521
Source: MSN Clima

== See also ==
- Miranda de Ebro
- Comarca del Ebro

== Bibliography ==
- Tomero and Romillo (2007). Miranda Natural: Red de senderos en Miranda de Ebro y su entorno. Ayundamiento de Miranda de Ebro and Caja Burgos. LE 888–2007.
