= Treviño enclave dispute =

Dispute over a territory in northern Spain

The Treviño enclave as part of Burgos in green, Álava in yellow and the capital cities of both provinces in orange

The conflict over the Treviño enclave is a territorial dispute in northern Spain between the administration of the Province of Burgos and Castile and León on the one side, and those of Álava and the Basque Country on the other, over the administration of the territory. The conflict does not only involve territorial questions, but also extends to political and language issues, as well as questions about provision of services and transport connections.

Geographically, the enclave is situated inside the Province of Álava, which completely surrounds it. However, administratively, it belongs to the Province of Burgos. The territory is near the large Basque city of Vitoria-Gasteiz, with over 250,000 inhabitants, while the nearest urban center in Burgos province is Miranda de Ebro, with about 40,000 inhabitants. The enclave holds cultural, commercial and linguistic links with the neighbouring Álava province. According to a Burgos newspaper, in a legal sense there is no territorial dispute, since Treviño's status as part of Castile and León is long established. However, Treviño has been subject to heated political dispute during the last decades, including legal litigation at the highest level.

The two municipalities which make up the enclave, Condado de Treviño and La Puebla de Arganzón, have at various times sought to join Álava, and the inhabitants of the two towns have also campaigned to join the Basque Country.

== History ==
Treviño was officially founded in 1161 by King Sancho VI of Navarre on the site of a monastery. and became part of the Kingdom of Castile in 1201, following a military victory by King Alfonso VIII of Castile over the Navarrans.

When Javier de Burgos conducted the 1833 territorial division of Spain—a decision passed by royal decree—one of the principles held in the new arrangement was the elimination of enclaves and their incorporation into the nearest appropriate territory, in this case the closest territory belonging to the Spanish general regime, as opposed to the Basque territories (Exempt Territories, Foral Territories). Nevertheless, the Treviño enclave survived and was confirmed as part of Castile in the final legislation. The Basque territories clung on to home rule (fueros) up to the end of the Third Carlist War, with their separate taxation system. Therefore, the fiscal contribution of the enclave added to the Spanish central coffers, not to the Basque relevant one—Álava.

Following this legislation, three unsuccessful attempts were made to incorporate the area into Álava. In 1880, the two municipalities covering Treviño requested that they be transferred from Burgos to Álava, while the inhabitants of the enclave requested their transfer in 1940 and 1958.

=== Position of Álava and the Treviño enclave ===
Most of the main political parties in Álava are in favour of adding the Treviño enclave to their territory. Modern votes on Treviño's status date from the 1940 referendum in Treviño, where 98% of the population voted to join Álava. Several further attempts have occurred since then. In 1980, both municipalities of the enclave overwhelmingly voted in support of an incorporation into Álava; some time before, UCD representatives in the councils had been removed from their positions for supporting the incorporation.

In 1998, in another unofficial referendum, 68% of voters in the exclave were in favour of holding an official referendum on joining Álava. 76% of voters took part. The municipality of La Puebla de Arganzón voted in 1995 and 1997 to join Álava. The majority of political parties in Treviño are in favour of joining Álava, with the authorities of the enclave requesting the initiation of proceedings leading to their incorporation into Álava in 2013. Their reasons are usually the regular historic bonds, cultural idiosyncrasy, commercial links and the practical grounds of better links with Álava rather than Burgos.

=== Position of Burgos ===
In contrast, all political groupings in Burgos have defended the enclave remaining part of their territory, on both legal and historic grounds.

== 1970s and 1980s ==
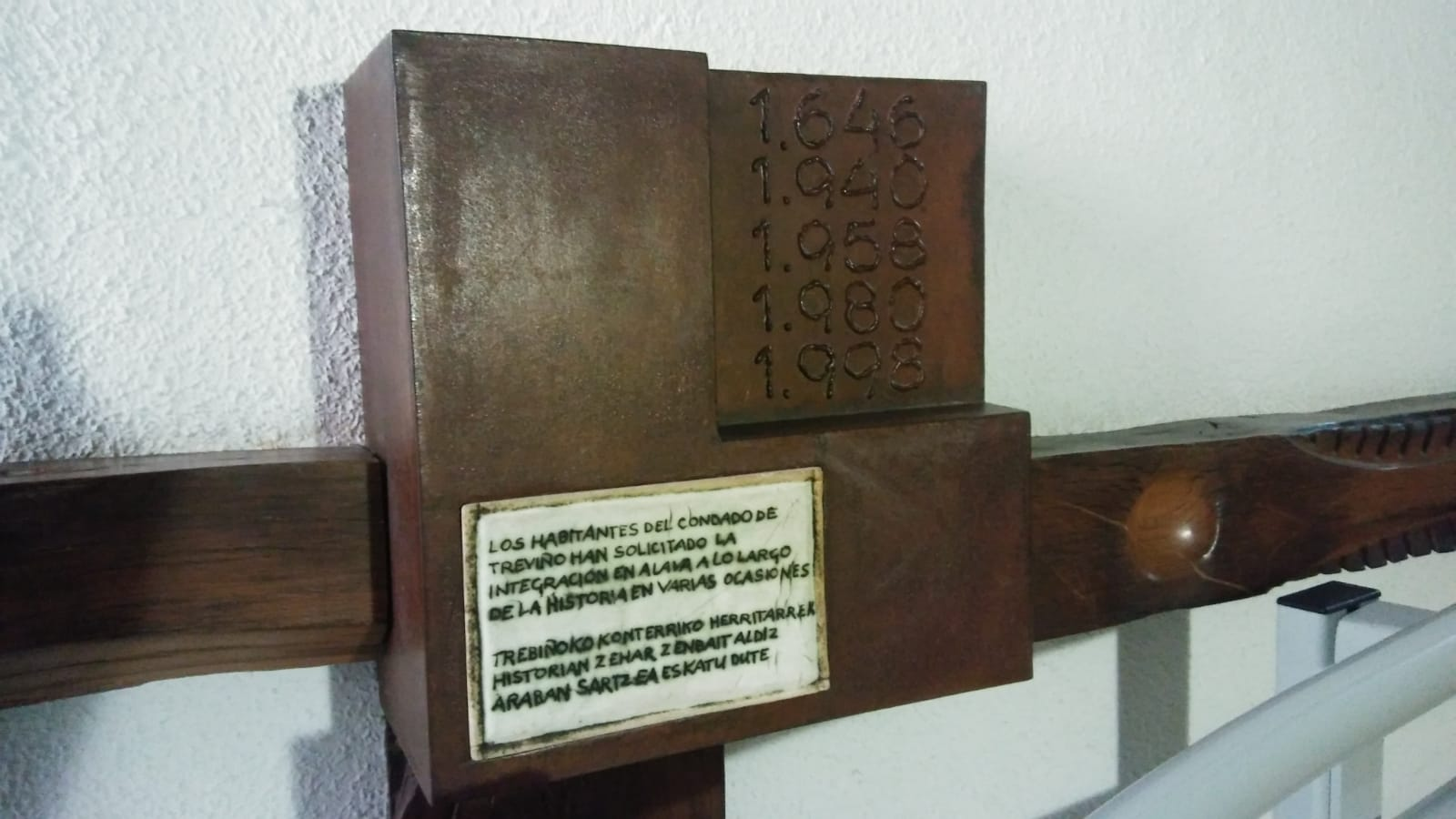
Sculpture in the town hall of Condado de Treviño recalling the historical attempts by Treviño to become part of Álava

In 1979, deputies (congressmen) Xabier Arzalluz of the Basque Nationalist Party (PNV) and José María Bandrés of Euskadiko Ezkerra, affirmed that Article 8 of the then-new Statute of Autonomy of the Basque Country was intended to integrate Treviño into Álava and the similar exclave of Villaverde de Trucíos (Cantabria) into Biscay. Nonetheless, Treviño remained part of the province of Burgos. Burgos was quick to react by sealing in their later Statute of Autonomy (1983) any possibility of a smooth integration of Treviño into Álava by means of provisions that actually clash with the avenues established in the Basque Statute of Autonomy (1978), since it requires the consent of the authorities of the province of Burgos and the autonomous community of Castile and León before Treviño can join Álava.

After that, the government and parliament of the Basque Country brought a case challenging the constitutionality of that provision, but in 1986 it was rejected by the Constitutional Court of Spain. (The Statutes of Autonomy in Spain were approved as Organic Law by the Cortes Generales)

== 2013 and on ==
The 2011 local elections in the two Treviño municipalities resulted in a majority of seats for parties in favour of joining Álava and a formal request for this to take place. However, the Province of Burgos blocked the move. The position held by the Castilian authorities has halted attempts by the municipalities to change their status. The mayor of the Treviño municipality stated in February 2014 that the question of Treviño has been turned into a matter of State, and urged the Spanish government to accept the bill passed by the Basque parliament to take the steps necessary for the incorporation of the enclave.

In the 2015 local elections pro-integration parties won the elections again in both Condado de Treviño and La Puebla de Arganzón. In Condado de Treviño two local parties in favour of joining Álava were the most voted (Citizens of El Condado and Independent Group of the Condado de Treviño), while in Arganzón the independent group "Nueva Puebla" gained 64.69% of the votes. In April 2018, after 23 years of dire dispute on the provision of services to the enclave's population, the authorities of Burgos and Álava reached a large-scale agreement in this respect. As of June 2019, two Basque parties, PNV and EH Bildu, rule in the two municipalities making up the enclave following electoral victories, with a key point in their agenda to incorporate Treviño into Álava.

== In film ==
The 2019 Spanish comedy film The Little Switzerland is inspired by the Treviño dispute and the British comedy Passport to Pimlico. The inhabitants of Tellería, a Castilian enclave in the Basque Country, try to become a new Swiss canton after being frustrated by both Basque and Castile-Leon authorities.

== Sources ==
- This article draws heavily on the corresponding article in the Spanish-language Wikipedia, which was accessed in the version of 23 March 2014.
