= Independent Group of the Condado de Treviño =

Independent Group of the Condado de Treviño Agrupación Electoral Independiente del Condado de Treviño
- Leader: Ignacio Portilla
- Founded: 1991
- Headquarters: Treviño, Condado de Treviño
- Ideology: Integration of the Enclave of Treviño in the Basque Autonomous Community
- Municipal Council of Treviño: 2 / 9

Independent Group of the Condado de Treviño (Spanish: Agrupación Electoral Independiente del Condado de Treviño, AECT) is a municipal political party in Condado de Treviño (Castille and León, Spain) created in 1991.

== Ideology and goals ==
The party supports an integration of the Enclave of Treviño in Álava and therefore in the Basque Country. The main arguments in favor of integration are the will of most of the treviñeses, and the problems that the Enclave of Treviño suffers due to its isolation from the rest of the Province of Burgos, especially in the area of public services.

== Election results ==
AECT governed the municipality between 1999 and 2007.

Election	Municipal council of Condado de Treviño				
Election	Votes	%	Position	Seats	+/–
1991	243	40.1	2º	4 / 9	New
1995	239	39.4	2º	3 / 7	▼1
1999	311	48.9	1º	4 / 7	▲1
2003	357	50.8	1º	5 / 9	▲1
2007	224	32.7	2º	3 / 9	▼2
2011	120	17.4	3º	2 / 9	▼1
2015	144	21.3	2º	2 / 9	=
