= Comarca del Ebro =

Coordinates: 42°40′03″N 3°02′16″W

Ebro
- Comarca
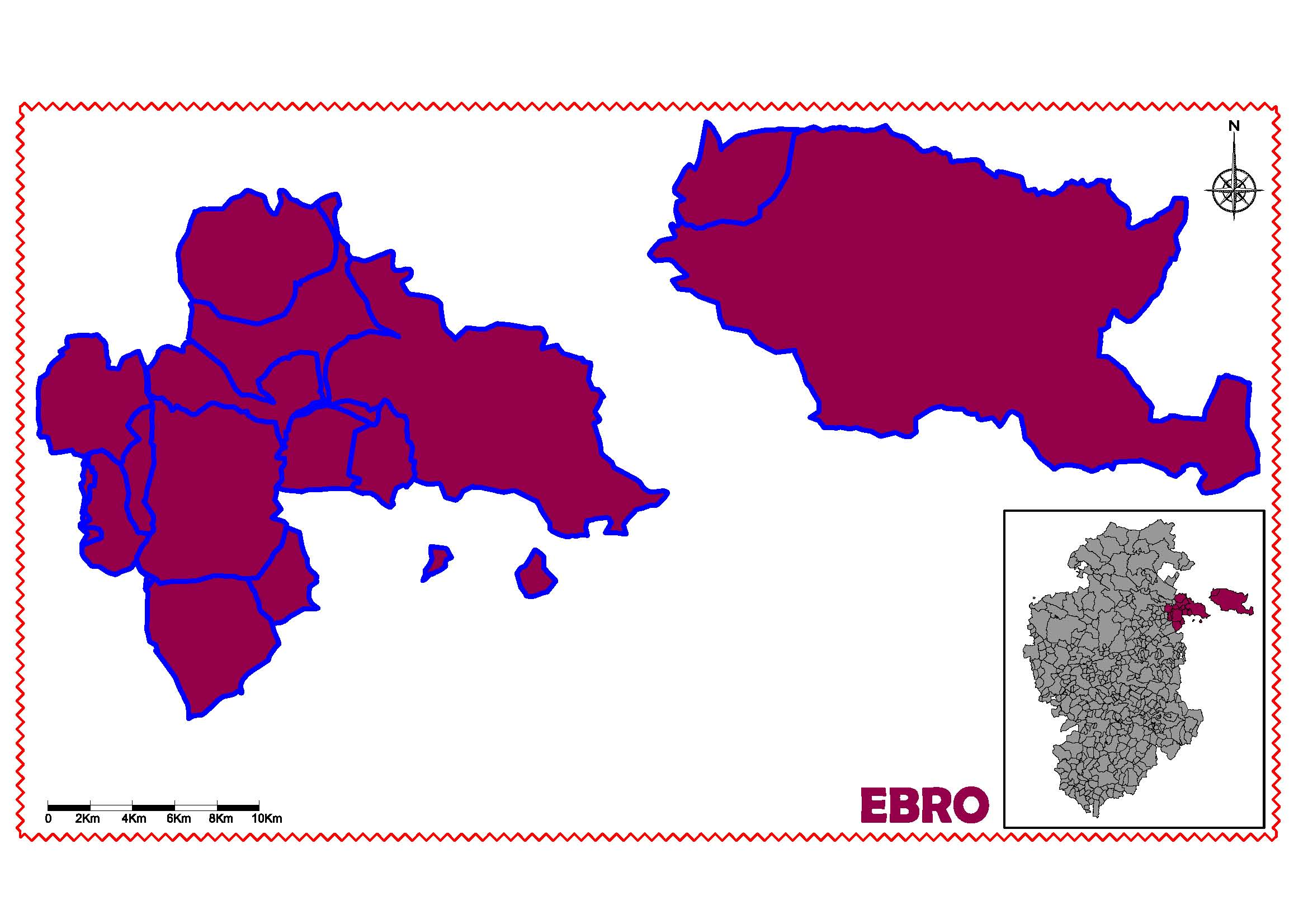
- Country: Spain
- Autonomous community: Castile and León
- Province: Burgos
- Capital: Miranda de Ebro
- Time zone: UTC+1 (CET)
  - Summer (DST): UTC+2 (CEST)
- Largest municipality: Miranda de Ebro

The Comarca del Ebro, also known as Valle del Ebro, is a comarca of the Province of Burgos in the autonomous community of Castile and León, Spain. It is located in the northeast of the province, and is divided from northwest to southeast by the River Ebro. The Obarenes Mountains separate the comarca from the Meseta Central to the west. Its capital is Miranda de Ebro, and its population is roughly 58,000 in the 2000s.

Two of its municipalities—Condado de Treviño and La Puebla de Arganzón—together form the enclave of Treviño, completely surrounded by the province of Álava, and hence are not contiguous to the rest of the comarca, while one depopulated village, El Ternero, is an enclave within Haro, La Rioja.

== Municipalities and localities ==
The comarca includes the following municipalities and other localities:

- Ajarte
- Altable
- Ameyugo
- Añastro
- Araico
- Arana
- Armentia
- Arrieta
- Ayuelas
- Ascarza
- Bardauri
- Bayas
- Bozoó
- Bugedo
- Burgueta
- Condado de Treviño
- Dordóniz
- Encío
- Grandival
- Guinicio
- Herrera
- Ircio
- La Puebla de Arganzón
- Marauri
- Meana
- Mesanza
- Miranda de Ebro
- Montañana
- Moraza
- Moriana
- Moscardor de Treviño
- Muergas
- Obarenes
- Obécuri
- Ochate
- Ocilla y Ladrera
- Ogueta
- Orón
- Ozana
- Pancorbo
- Pangua
- Páriza
- Pedruzo
- Portilla
- Sajuela
- Samiano
- San Martín de Galvarín
- San Martín de Zar
- San Miguel del Monte
- Santa Gadea del Cid
- Saraso
- Sáseta
- Suzana
- Ternero
- Torre
- Uzquiano
- Valluércanes
- Valverde de Miranda
- Villanueva Soportilla
