= Saint John of the Mountain Festival =

Festival in Miranda de Ebro, Castile and León, Spain

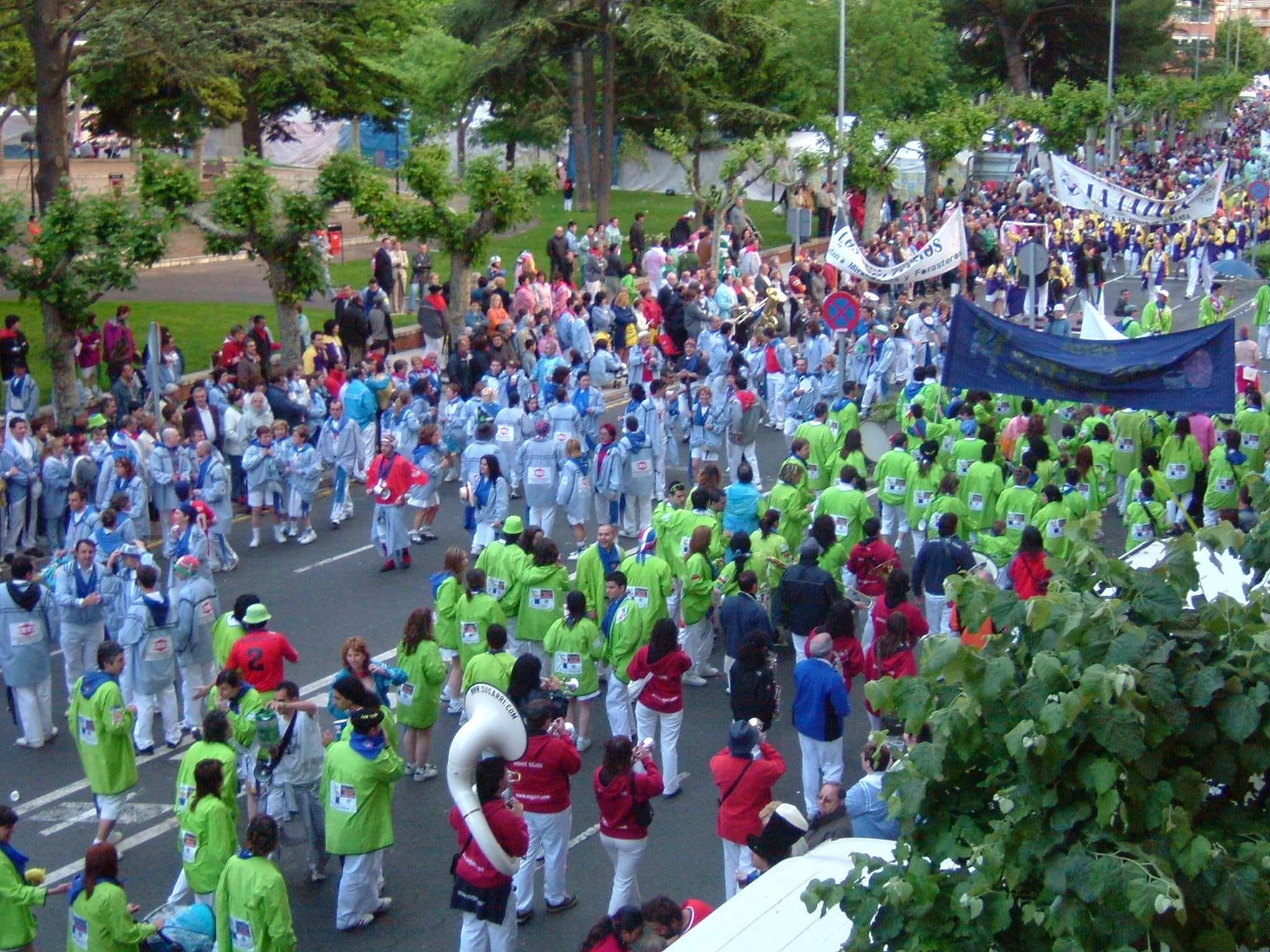
Parade in 2007

Saint John of the Mountain Festival is a festival in the town of Miranda de Ebro in the autonomous community of Castile and León, in Spain. It is celebrated on the Monday of Pentecost and held in the Monte de San Juan. It is the second most important romeria in Spain behind El Rocío.

It is an ancestral party whose first documentary references date from the 14th century. In 2015, they were declared Festivities of National Tourist Interest, a rank already achieved in 1975, but lost in later years due to administrative issues. Since 1996 holds the title of Fiesta of Tourist Interest of Castilla y León by the regional government.
