= Uzquiano =

Coordinates: 42.7405°N 2.6856°W

Uzquiano, Spain
- village
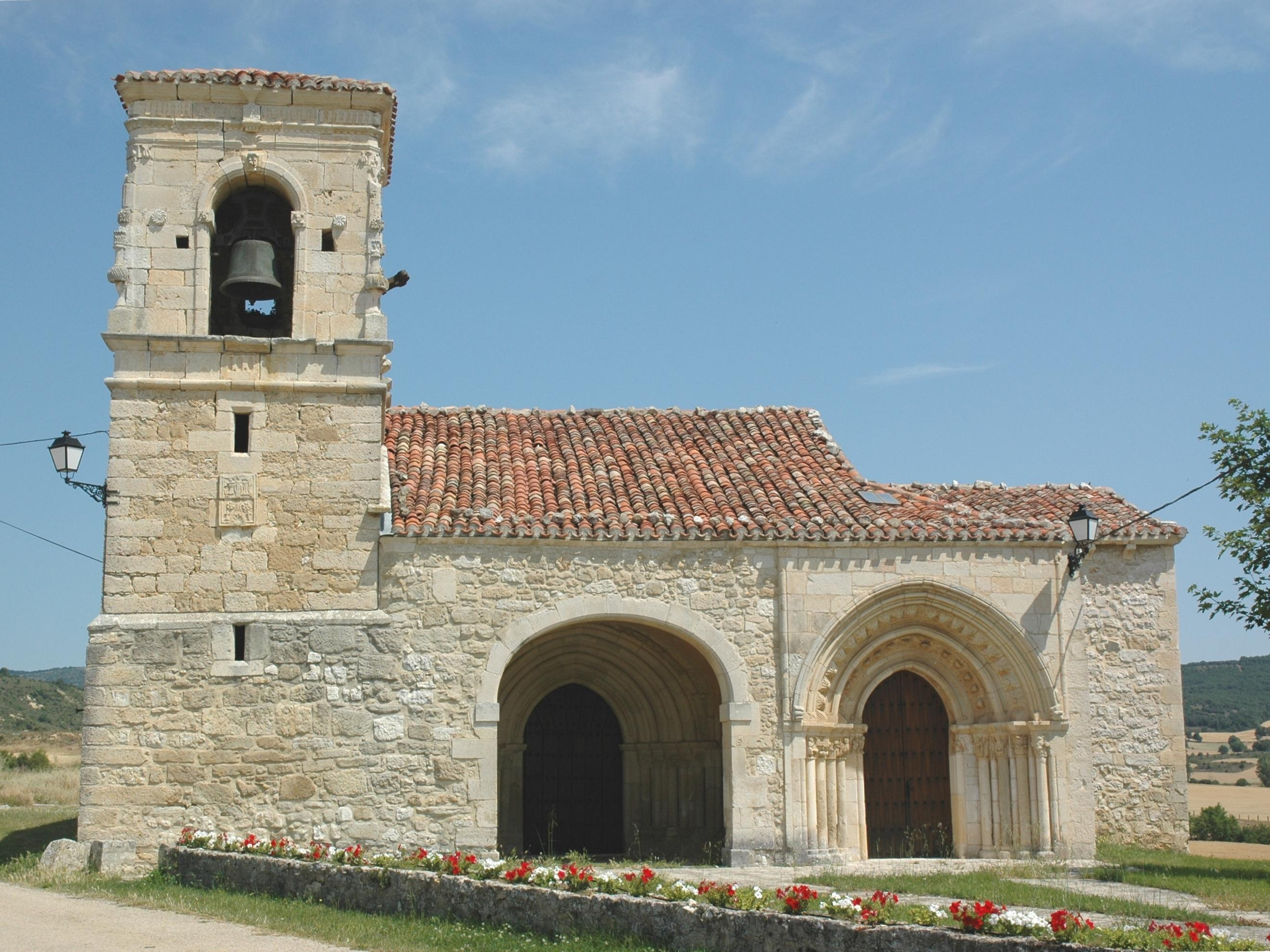
- Uzquiano parish church
- Interactive map of Uzquiano, Spain
- Country: Spain
- Autonomous community: Castile and León
- Province: Burgos
- Comarca: Enclave of Treviño
- Municipality: Condado de Treviño

Population (2020)
  - Total: 16
- Time zone: UTC+1 (CET)
  - Summer (DST): UTC+2 (CEST)

Uzquiano is a village in the Enclave of Treviño of the province of Burgos, Spain. The village is about 11 kilometres (6.8 mi) south of the Basque city of Vitoria-Gasteiz, and is just under 3 kilometres south of the village of Ochate.

== History ==
Historical records dating as far as 1025 AD mention the village. The village is mentioned in the "Reja de San Millán" document, as a settlement split into 2 distinct parts, Guzquiano and Guzquiano de suso. According to the "Letter of Bishop Aznar", one of the 2 settlements had disappeared by 1257, possibly due to migration.

== Landmarks ==
=== The Church of our Lady of the Assumption ===
The parish church, Iglesia de Nuestra Señora de la Asunción, is a small but notable example of late Romanesque architecture. It was built in the 13th century, displaying a transition from Romanesque architecture to early Gothic architecture. The bell tower was built around 17th and 18th century, and by 1964, a modern extension was added to east side of the portico to serve as the village baptistery. An important feature of this renovation is the historic Romanesque doorway, salvaged from the abandoned church of San Miguel in Ochate, and incorporated into the parish church thereby giving it two doorways. The door inside the portico provides direct access to the Church, and is its own. The second doorway, outside the portico, came from San Miguel.

=== The hermitage of Saint Juan ===
The village also had a hermitage on a mountain side, dedicated to Saint Juan, that survived till 1792 before being demolished. The reason for this is believed to be complete abandonment, contributed to its difficult to reach location.

== Demographics ==
Demographic evolution of Uzquiano (2000–2022)
Year	Population
2000	15
2001	13
2002	13
2003	13
2004	11
2005	11
2006	13
2007	14
2008	25
2009	26
2010	24
2011	24
2012	24
2013	23
2014	18
2015	12
2016	13
2017	15
2022	13
Legal population according to the municipal register of the INE (National Statistics Institute)

== See also ==
- Ochate
- Basque Country
- Romanesque Architecture
