= Encío =

Coordinates: 42°40′N 3°05′W

- Municipality and town
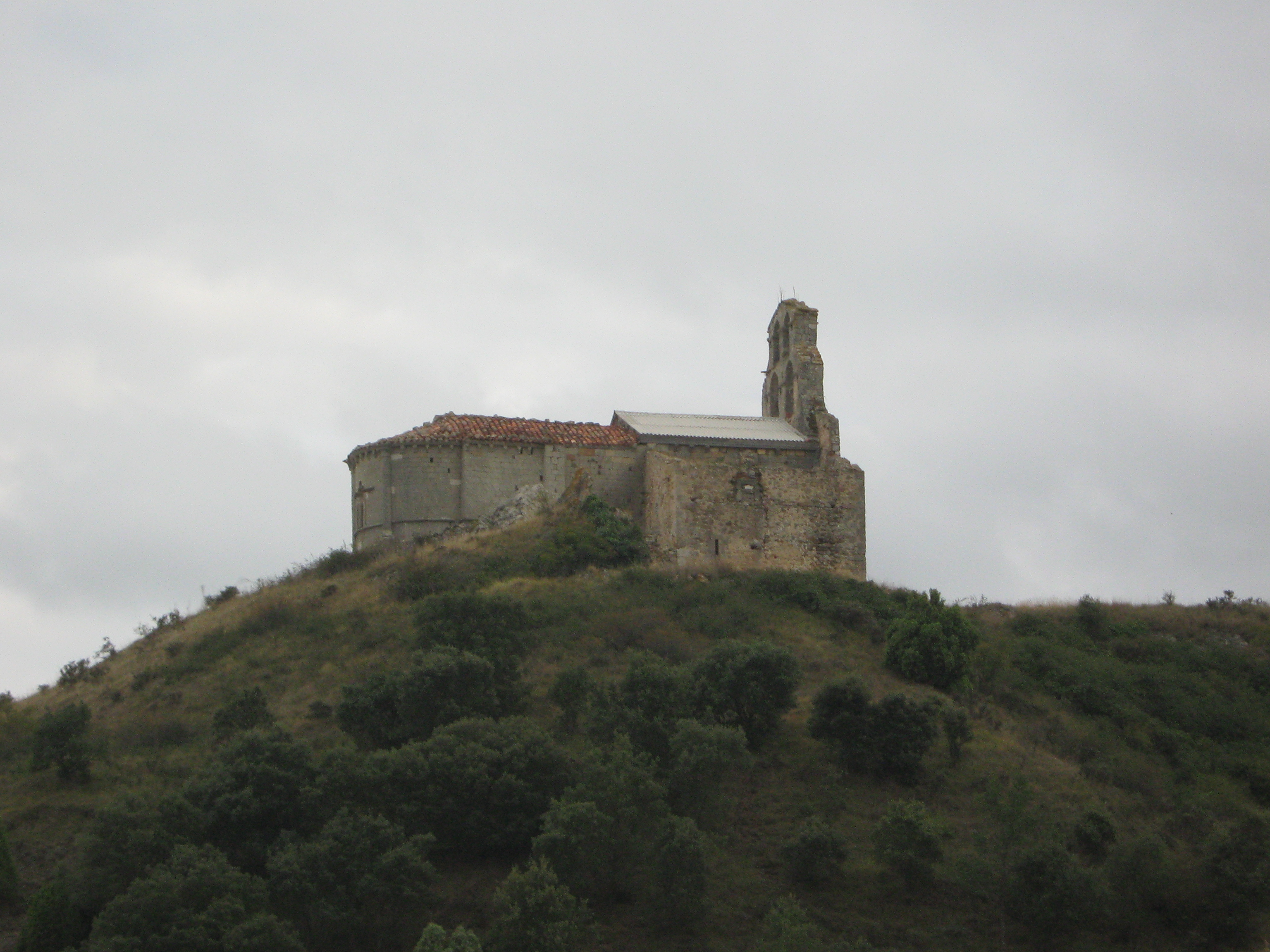
- San Cosme y San Damián church (12th-13th century)

- Coat of arms
- Interactive map of Encío
- Country: Spain
- Autonomous community: Castile and León
- Province: Burgos
- Comarca: Comarca del Ebro

Area
  - Total: 19 km^{2} (7.3 sq mi)

Population (2025-01-01)
  - Total: 37
  - Density: 1.9/km^{2} (5.0/sq mi)
- Time zone: UTC+1 (CET)
  - Summer (DST): UTC+2 (CEST)
- Postal code: 09219
- Website: http://www.encio.es/

Encío is a municipality and town located in the province of Burgos, Castile and León, Spain. According to the 2004 census (INE), the municipality has a population of 53 inhabitants.
