= Bozoó =

Coordinates: 42°43′42″N 3°05′06″W

- Municipality and town
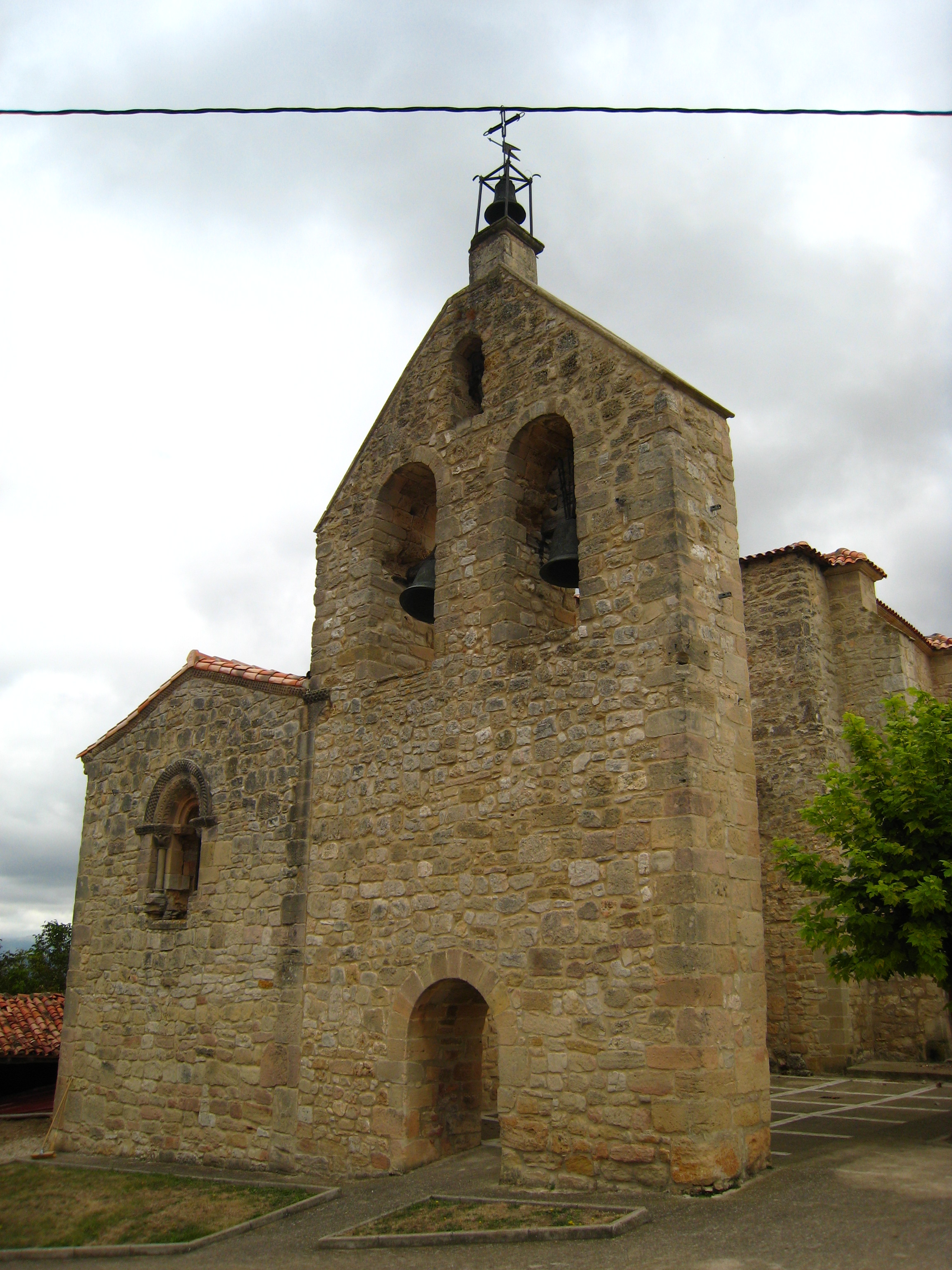
- San Julián y Santa Basilia church (9th-15th centuries)

- Flag Coat of arms
- Interactive map of Bozoó
- Country: Spain
- Autonomous community: Castile and León
- Province: Burgos
- Comarca: Comarca del Ebro

Area
  - Total: 33.16 km^{2} (12.80 sq mi)
- Elevation: 580 m (1,900 ft)

Population (2025-01-01)
  - Total: 101
  - Density: 3.05/km^{2} (7.89/sq mi)
- Time zone: UTC+1 (CET)
  - Summer (DST): UTC+2 (CEST)
- Postal code: 09219
- Website: http://www.bozoo.es/

Bozoó is a municipality and town located in the province of Burgos, Castile and León, Spain. According to the 2004 census (INE), the municipality has a population of 110 inhabitants.

The municipality of Bozoó is made up of three villages: Bozoó (seat or capital), Portilla and Villanueva Soportilla.
