= Altable =

- Municipality and town
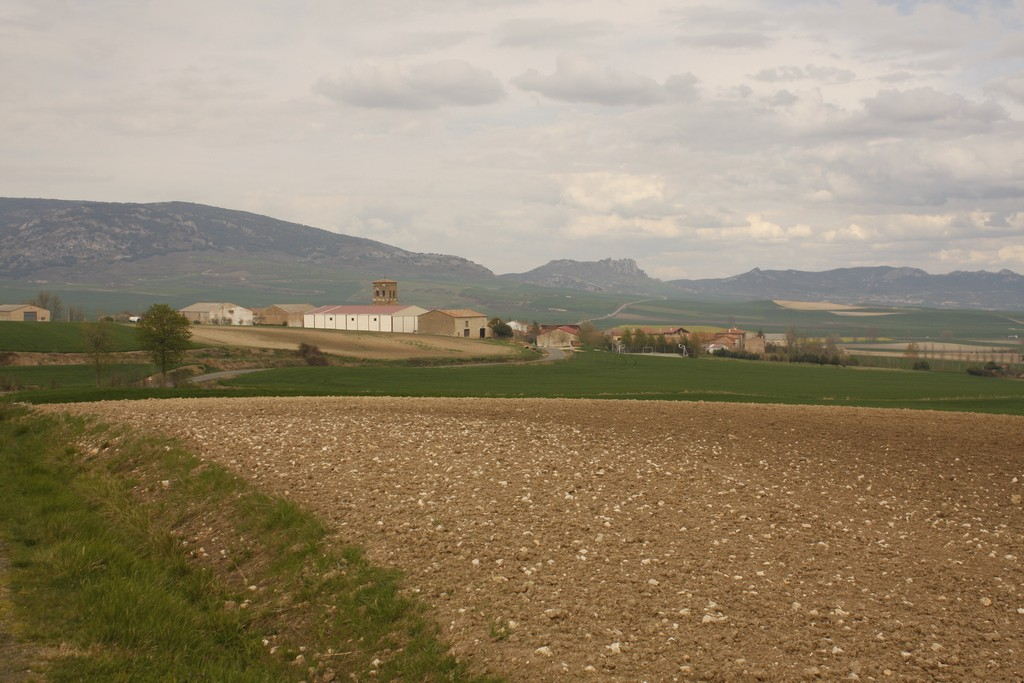
- View of Altable, 2010

- Flag Coat of arms

- Location within Castile and León Location within Spain
- Coordinates: 42°36′N 3°04′W
- Country: Spain
- Autonomous community: Castile and León
- Province: Burgos
- Comarca: Comarca del Ebro

Area
  - Total: 8.22 km^{2} (3.17 sq mi)
- Elevation: 710 m (2,330 ft)

Population (2004)
  - Total: 61
  - Density: 7.4/km^{2} (19/sq mi)
- Time zone: UTC+1 (CET)
  - Summer (DST): UTC+2 (CEST)
- Postal code: 09219
- Website: http://www.altable.es/

Altable is a municipality and town located in the province of Burgos, Castile and León, Spain. According to the 2004 census (INE), the municipality has a population of 61 inhabitants.

== Geography ==
Located in the Ebro Valley region, it is 66 kilometres from Burgos. The municipality is crossed by the N-232 national road, between pK 468 and 470, and by a local road that heads towards Valluércanes. The relief is defined to the north by the Obarenes Mountains, later opening up to a flat area with several streams where the town is located. To the south the slope is again ascending but is predominantly flat. The altitude ranges between 950 metres to the north and 670 metres to the east, on the banks of the river Ea. The town stands at 712 metres above sea level.
