= Askartza =

Hamlet in Álava, Spain

- Concejo
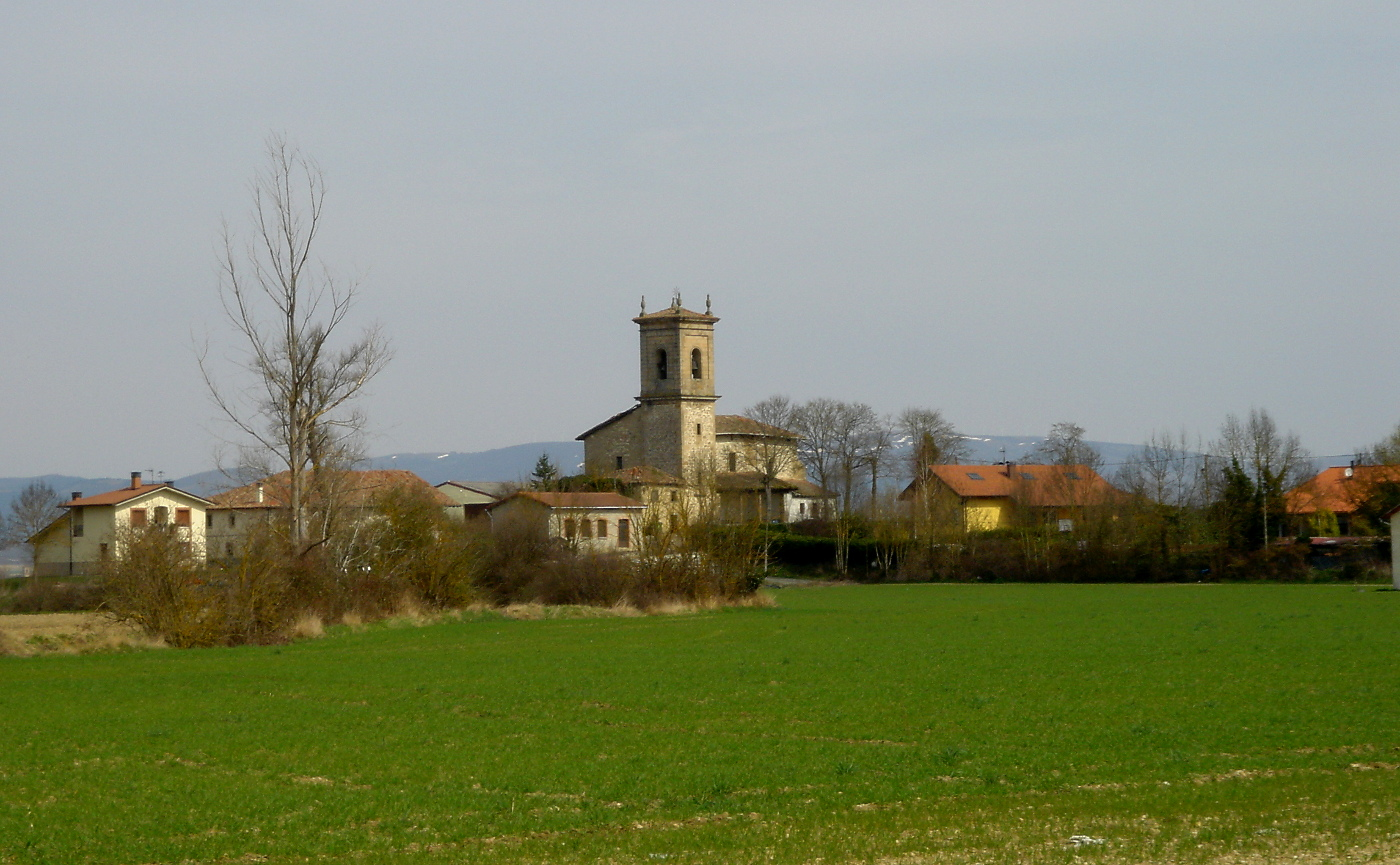
- View of Askartza

- Coat of arms

- Location within Álava Location within the Basque Country Location within Spain
- Coordinates: 42°50′29″N 2°36′44″W
- Country: Spain
- Autonomous community: Basque Country
- Province: Álava
- Comarca: Vitoria-Gasteiz
- Municipality: Vitoria-Gasteiz

Area
  - Total: 2.42 km^{2} (0.93 sq mi)
- Elevation: 534 m (1,752 ft)

Population (2023)
  - Total: 65
  - Density: 27/km^{2} (70/sq mi)
- Postal code: 01193

Askartza (Spanish: Ascarza) is a hamlet and concejo in the municipality of Vitoria-Gasteiz, in Álava province, Basque Country, Spain.

== History ==
Askartza was one of the hamlets administered by the Brotherhood of Arriaga that were ceded to Vitoria in 1331. The parish church houses a baptismal font that belonged to the church of Urrialdo, now depopulated. The Way of Saint James passes through Askartza.
