= Bugedo =

Coordinates: 42°39′N 3°01′W

- Municipality and town
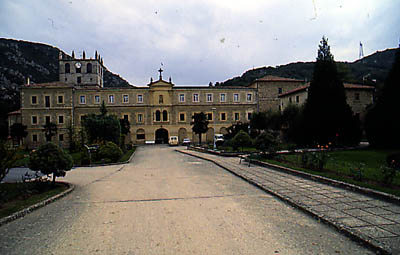
- Santa María de Bujedo monastery (12th-17th century)

- Flag Coat of arms
- Interactive map of Bugedo
- Country: Spain
- Autonomous community: Castile and León
- Province: Burgos
- Comarca: Comarca del Ebro

Area
  - Total: 10 km^{2} (3.9 sq mi)
- Elevation: 534 m (1,752 ft)

Population (2025-01-01)
  - Total: 193
  - Density: 19/km^{2} (50/sq mi)
- Time zone: UTC+1 (CET)
  - Summer (DST): UTC+2 (CEST)
- Postal code: 09293
- Website: https://www.bugedo.es/

Bugedo is a municipality and town located in the province of Burgos, Castile and León, Spain.
