= La Puebla de Arganzón =

- Municipality and town
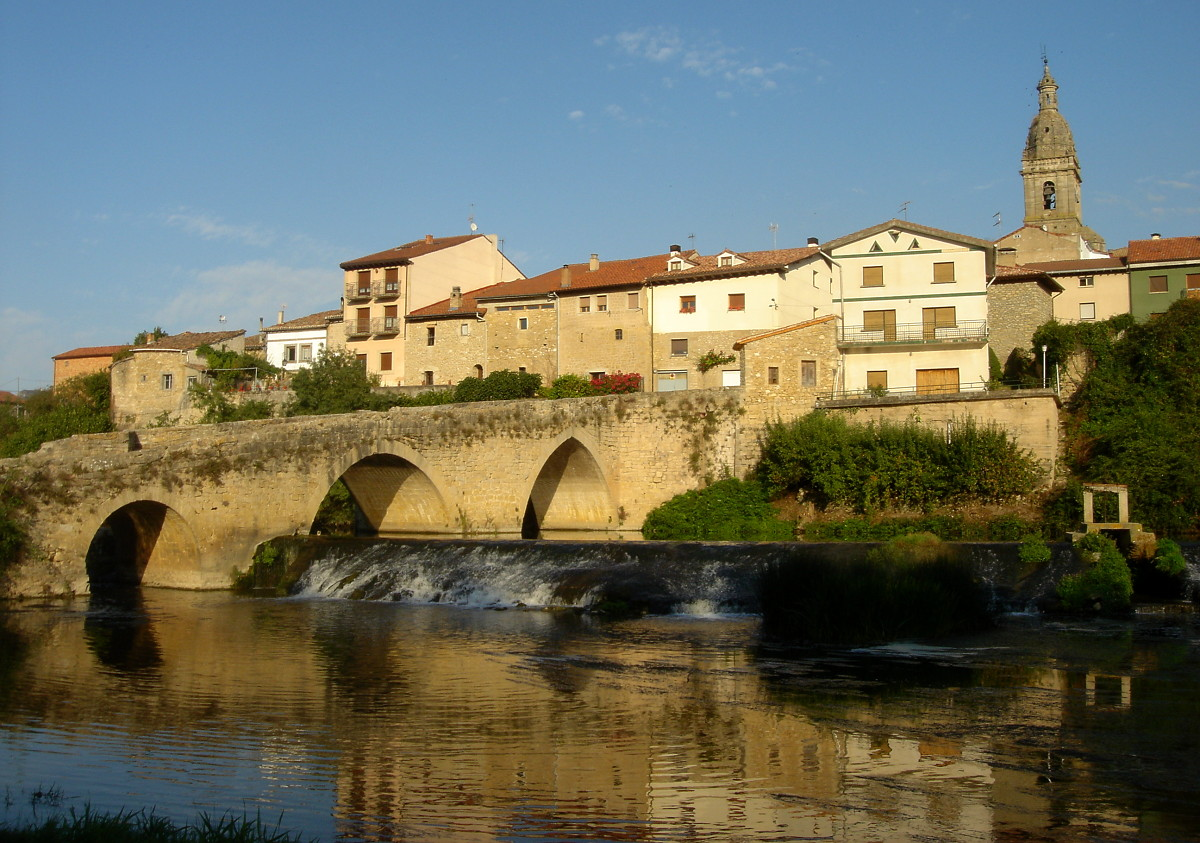
- View of La Puebla de Arganzón, 2008

- Flag Coat of arms
- Interactive map of La Puebla de Arganzón
- Coordinates: 42°46′5″N 2°49′49″W
- Country: Spain
- Autonomous community: Castile and León
- Province: Burgos
- Comarca: Comarca del Ebro
- Seat: La Puebla de Arganzón

Government
  - Type: Mayor-council government
  - Alcalde (Mayor): Roberto Ortíz Urbina (Agrupación Independiente Nueva Puebla)

Area
  - Total: 18.87 km^{2} (7.29 sq mi)
- Elevation: 481 m (1,578 ft)

Population (2025-01-01)
  - Total: 565
  - Density: 29.9/km^{2} (77.5/sq mi)
- Time zone: UTC+1 (CET)
  - Summer (DST): UTC+2 (CEST)
- Postal code: 09294
- Website: www.lapuebladearganzon.es

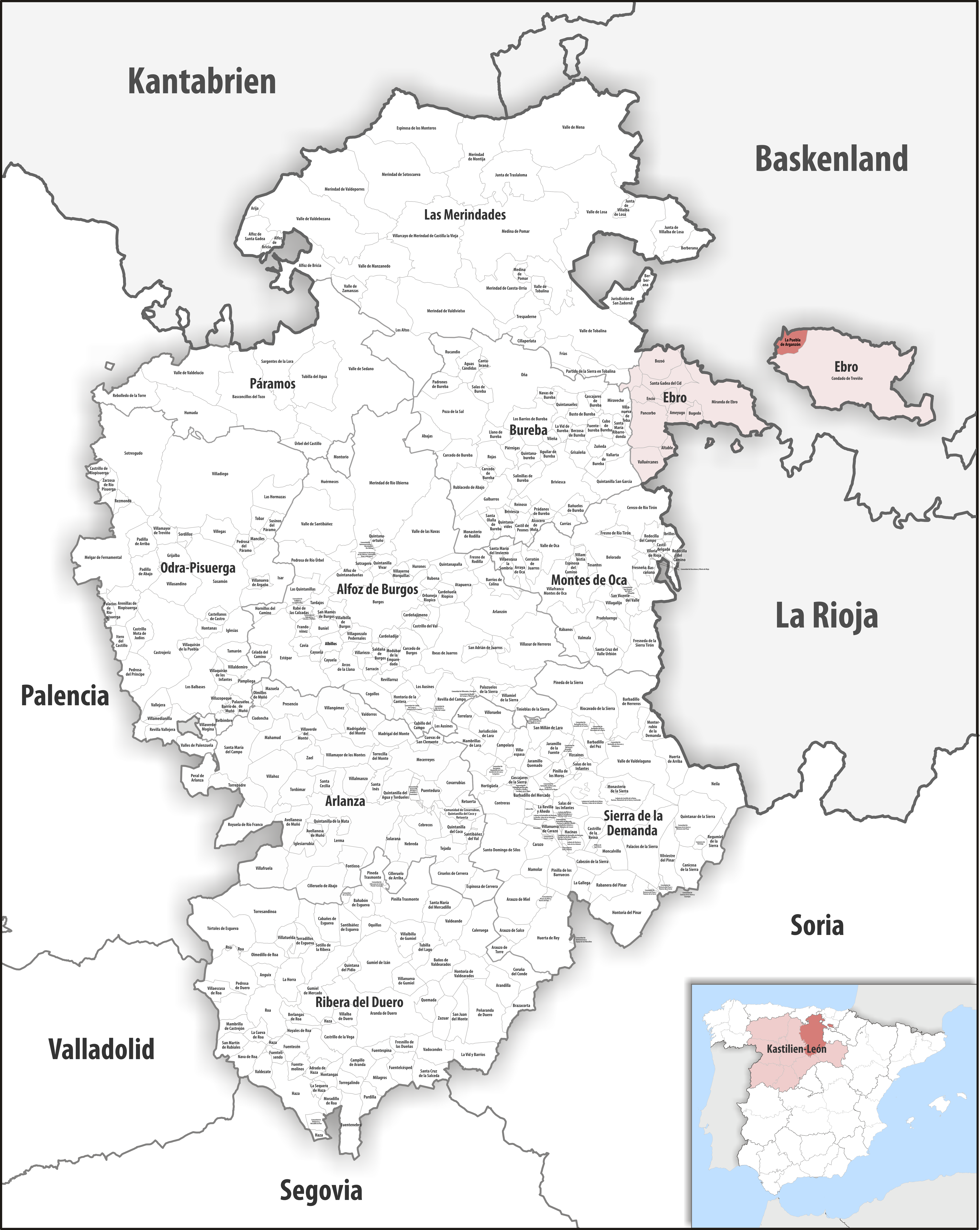
Location of La Puebla de Arganzón in the province of Burgos

La Puebla de Arganzón (also written Lapuebla de Arganzón; Basque: Argantzongo Puebla) is a municipality located in the province of Burgos, Castile and León, Spain. It is in the Comarca del Ebro and the Judicial district Miranda de Ebro. According to the INE, the municipality had a population of 529 inhabitants in 2009.

La Puebla de Arganzón and the adjacent municipality of Condado de Treviño together constitute the enclave of Treviño, part of the territory of Burgos, surrounded by the Basque province of Álava.

La Puebla de Arganzón has a surface area of 18.87 square kilometres (7.29 sq mi) with a population of 529 and a population density of 28.03 per square kilometre (72.6/sq mi).

The municipality of La Puebla de Arganzón is made up of two towns, the more important one sharing the name La Puebla de Arganzón; the other is Villanueva de la Oca, a small rural community.

There was older settlement named Arganzón, about a kilometre away from the present La Puebla. Its existence is cited as early as the year 871, but it disappeared in the 18th century.

The present Puebla de Arganzón was founded toward the end of the 12th century, at a time of border wars between the kingdoms of Castile and Navarre. It obtained a fuero establishing it as a community in 1191. According to José Joaquín de Landázuri, that fuero was granted by the Navarrese king Sancho VI ("Sancho el Sabio", "Sancho the Wise"), not by Alfonso VIII of Castile.

A large part of medieval La Puebla de Arganzón, a boat-shaped area that stretches from north to south, survives today, although new development has increased the size and population in recent years.

== Demographic history ==
Historical population

Year	Pop.	±% p.a.
1897	621	—
1900	622	+0.05%
1910	625	+0.05%
1920	680	+0.85%
1930	636	−0.67%

Year	Pop.	±% p.a.
1940	617	−0.30%
1950	613	−0.07%
1960	568	−0.76%
1970	506	−1.15%
1981	501	−0.09%

Year	Pop.	±% p.a.
1991	232	−7.41%
1996	265	+2.70%
2001	402	+8.69%
2004	465	+4.97%
2008	489	+1.27%

Source: 2001, 2004, 2008

== In fiction ==
The fictional liberal crusader Salvador Monsalud, hero of the ten books of the second series of Benito Pérez Galdós's Episodios Nacionales (written 1875–1879) was a native of La Puebla de Arganzón.
