= Obarenes Mountains =

Mountain range in northern Spain

Coordinates: 42.7344°N 3.1944°W

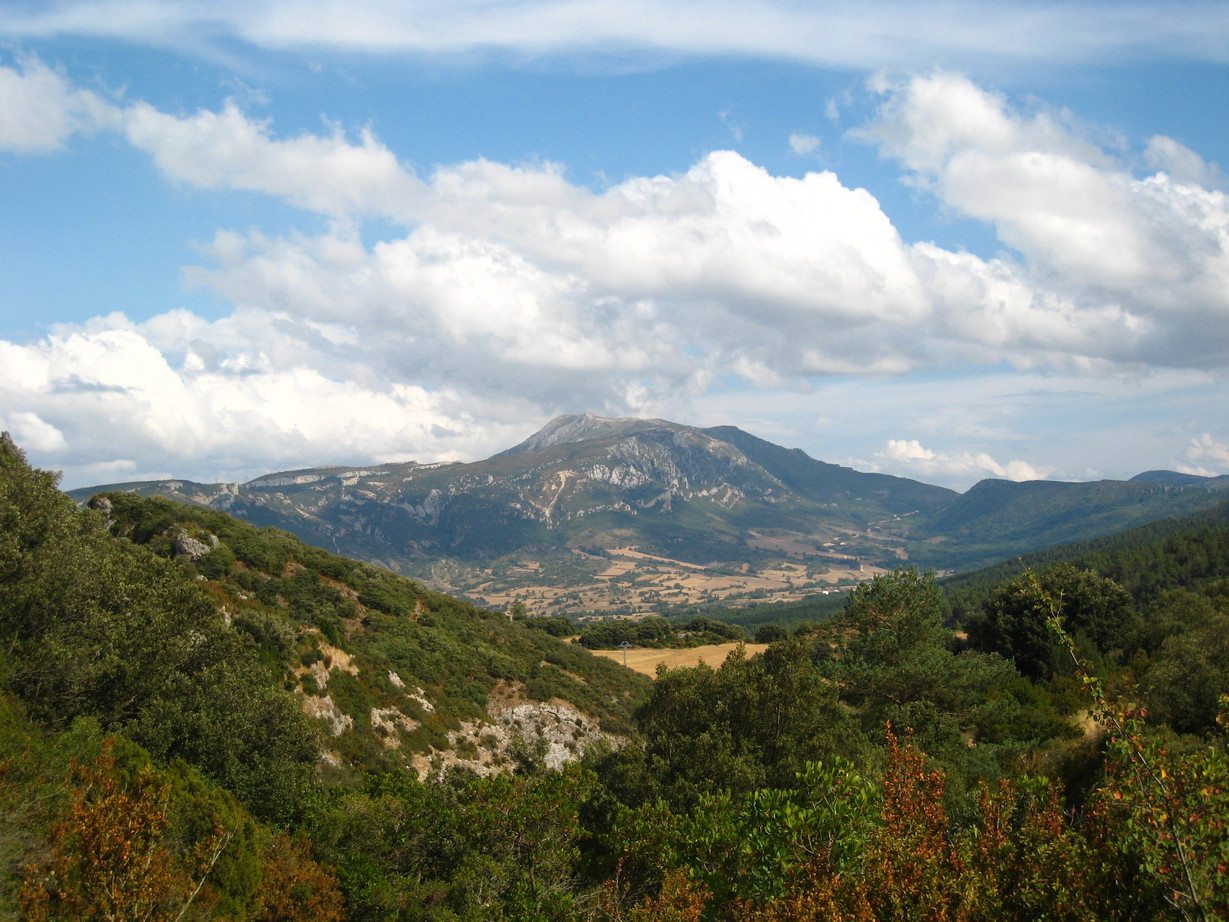
A view of the Obarenes Mountains

The Obarenes Mountains (Spanish: Montes Obarenes) is a mountain range in northern Spain.

The range has an approximate length of 30 km, and an average altitude of 800 and 900 meters. It extends from Hoces del Ebro in Sobrón (Burgos and Álava provinces) to the Conchas de Haro in La Rioja province, where the Ebro River separates it from the Cantabria or Toloño Mountains.
