= Treviño enclave =

Enclave de Treviño
- Enclave / Exclave
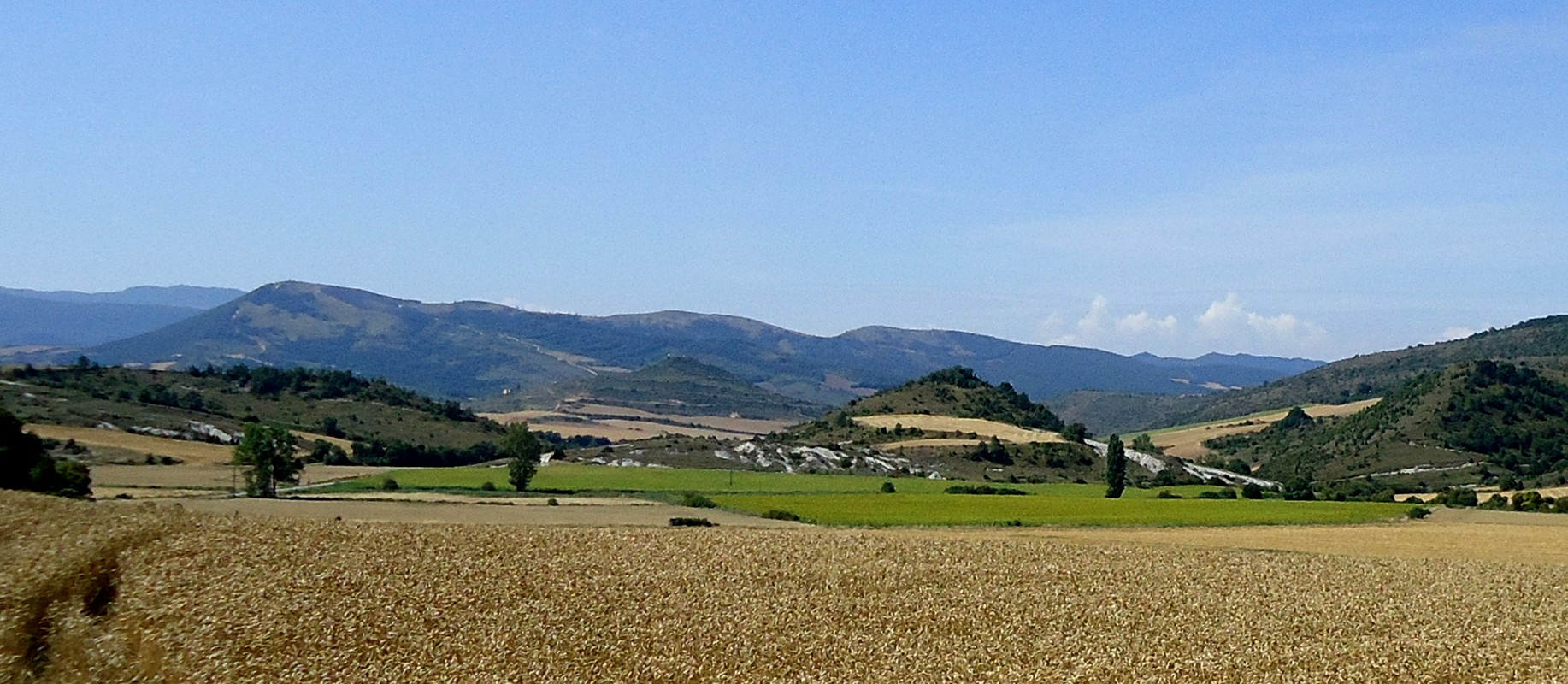
- Landscape of the Treviño enclave

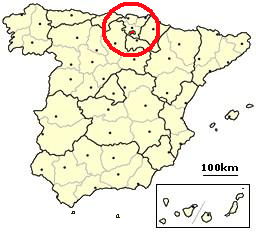
- Location of the enclave of Treviño (in red) within Spain.
- Coordinates: 42°44′5″N 2°44′50″W
- Country: Spain
- Autonomous community: Castile and León
- Province: Burgos
- Comarca: Ebro

Area
  - Total: 279.58 km^{2} (107.95 sq mi)
- Elevation: 552 m (1,811 ft)

Population (2009)
  - Total: 1,961
  - Density: 6.77/km^{2} (17.5/sq mi)
  - Demonym: treviñeses
- (INE)
- Time zone: UTC+1 (CET)
  - Summer (DST): UTC+2 (CEST)
- Postal code: 09215/09216/09217/09294

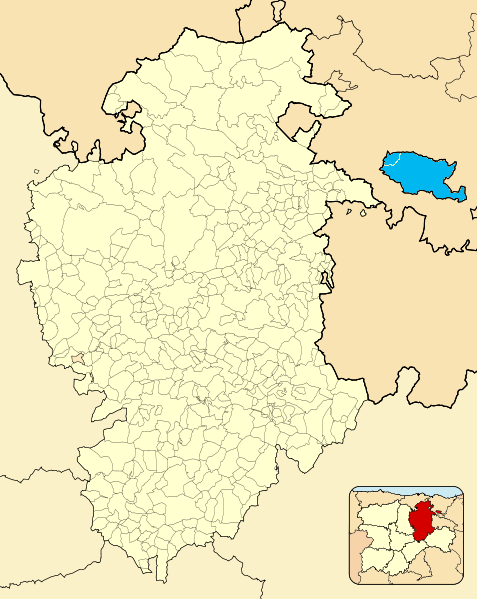
Location of the enclave of Treviño (in blue) in the province of Burgos. The larger of the two units within the enclave is the Condado de Treviño; the smaller is La Puebla de Arganzón.

The Treviño Enclave (Basque: Trebiñuko Barrendegia Spanish: Enclave de Treviño) in northern Spain is part of the territory of the province of Burgos (part of Castile and León), but is completely surrounded by the territory of the Basque Country province of Álava. Thus, it is an enclave of the Basque Country and an exclave of Castile and León. It consists of two municipalities—Condado de Treviño and La Puebla de Arganzón—and is part of the Judicial district (partido judicial) of Miranda de Ebro in the province of Burgos.

The enclave consists of the municipalities of Condado de Treviño, with an area of 260.71 square kilometres (100.66 sq mi) and a 2009 population of 1,432, giving it a population density of 5.49 per square kilometre (14.2/sq mi) and La Puebla de Arganzón, with an area of 18.87 square kilometres (7.29 sq mi) and a 2009 population of 529, giving it a population density of 28.03 per square kilometre (72.6/sq mi). This gives the enclave as a whole an area of 279.58 square kilometres (107.95 sq mi) and a 2009 population of 1,961, for a population density of 6.77 per square kilometre (17.5/sq mi).

== History ==
La Puebla de Arganzón obtained its founding fueros from Sancho VI of Navarre ("Sancho el Sabio", "Sancho the Wise") in 1191. The original fuero of Condado de Treviño is lost, but is believed to have been granted by the same king in 1161. In 1200, it was conquered by Alfonso VIII of Castile.

After Castile conquered Álava, most of the region was left under the relatively egalitarian fueros typical of the Basque Country. Treviño was not. First a royal seigneury, Treviño de Uda and its outlying villages were granted in 1366 to the noble Manrique family. In 1453 Diego Gómez Manrique de Lara y Castilla became a count, hence the Condado [County] de Treviño. His son Pedro Manrique de Lara became Duke of Nájera in 1482, a title that continues in the family down to the present day. In the 16th century these Counts of Treviño, Dukes de Nájera since 1593, built a palace at Treviño, which is now the ayuntamiento (town hall) of the municipality.

As a result, Treviño remained closely tied to Castile. The enclave of Treviño was one of the few enclaves preserved in the 1833 territorial division of Spain, an island of Old Castile in the midst of Álava. That arrangement of the territory of Spain remains largely in effect today, although the province of Burgos is now part of Castile-León rather than the historic region of Old Castile.

== Current status of the enclave ==
The status of the enclave of Treviño has long been the subject of bitter contention between the autonomous government of Castile and León and the government of the Basque Country, especially the provincial government of Álava. The drive to integrate the enclave into Álava extends to nearly the whole political spectrum in Álava, such as the regional branch of the right-of-centre PP, who differ with their co-partisans in Burgos on the matter. Inmaculada Ranedo of the PP, the mayor of Condado de Treviño, as of July 2008 leant toward at least cooperation with Álava, but she chose to let the governments at higher levels sort out the issues linked to its formal status.

The inhabitants of the enclave receive many of their services (health, education, etc.) in Vitoria-Gasteiz, Álava, but they pay tax to the Spanish central tax office, and not to the autonomous Basque one, at least since 1833 (new Spanish administrative distribution). During the litigation since the formation of the enclave, its population has unequivocally inclined towards the annexation of Treviño to Álava, as expressed by vote or as demanded by its municipal institutions. In 1940, just after the start of the Francoist regime, a plebiscite in the enclave, conducted by the Civil Government of Burgos, showed 98% support for the integration of Treviño into Álava; however, that was not acted upon. The last popular vote held in the namesake municipality in 1998 supported holding a referendum on the issue, but this was rejected by the Spanish government officials as invalid, "as if it did not exist". The regional council of Castile and León has repeatedly rejected local claims.

== Language ==
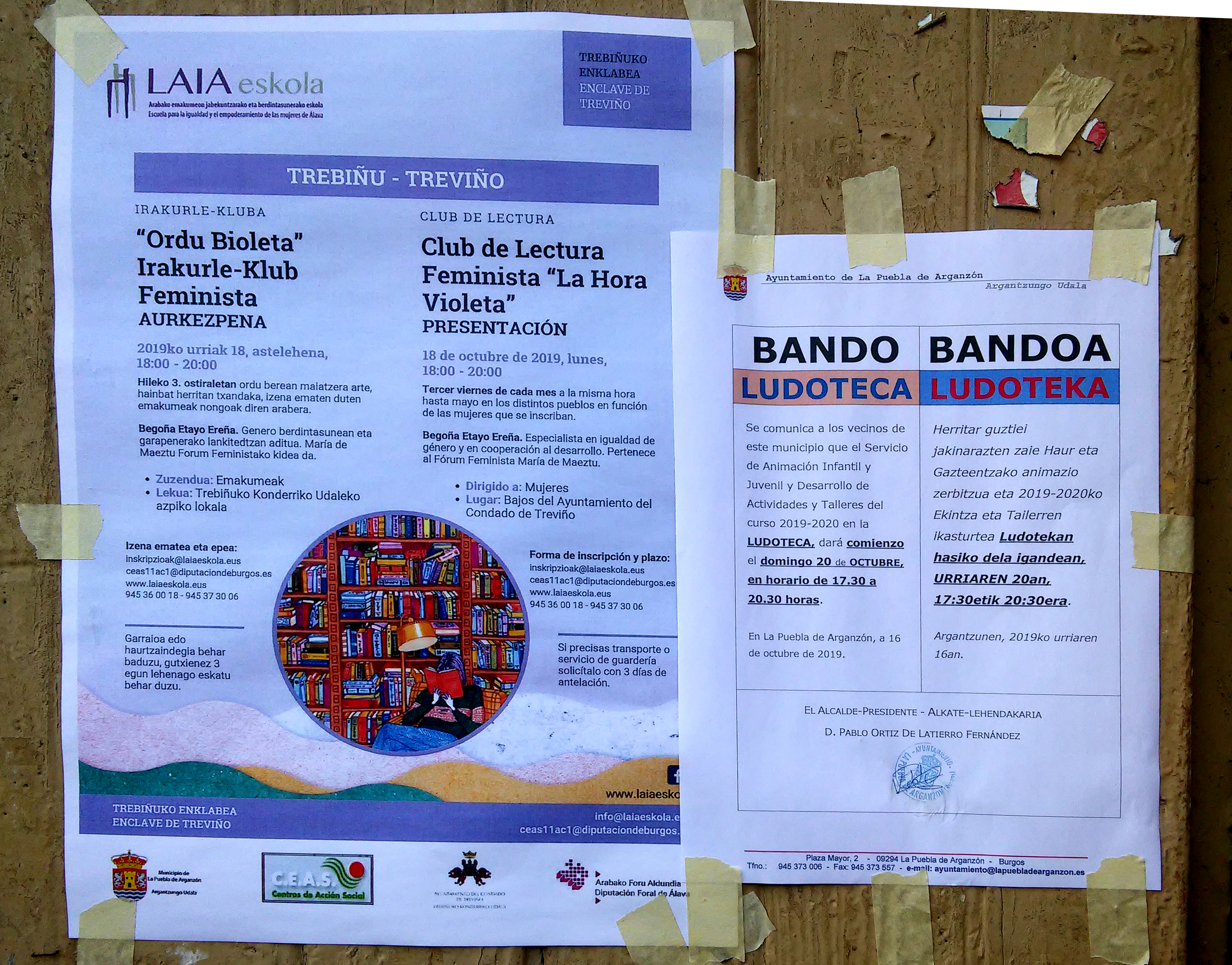
Local information notices in Spanish and Basque.

Many of the local place names in the enclave are of Basque origin, especially in the central and eastern parts. The Basque language is supposed to have been spoken in the enclave up to the late 18th century. As late as 1810, a French civil servant, Eugène Coquebert de Montbret, pinpointed La Puebla as the southernmost Basque-speaking town in Álava on a map showing Basque language boundaries.

There is no formal recognition of Basque (official in all of Álava, but not in Treviño). An ikastola (Basque language school), Argantzon Ikastola, was created in La Puebla in 2003. The main Basque education journal (Hik Hasi) claims an enrollment of children originating from the following locations: Tuyo, Grandival, Añastro, Burgeta, Pangua, Miranda, Araico, San Esteban, and Vitoria, all located in Treviño or surrounding areas. At any rate, local councils have agreed to promote Basque in their towns.

According to a 2012 linguistic study 22% of the population can speak Basque, and another 17% understand (but do not speak) the language. Basque is more prevalent among younger people, as 65% of those under 16 are bilingual.
