= Monastery of Santa María de Toloño =

Ruined monastery in Sierra de Toloño, Spain

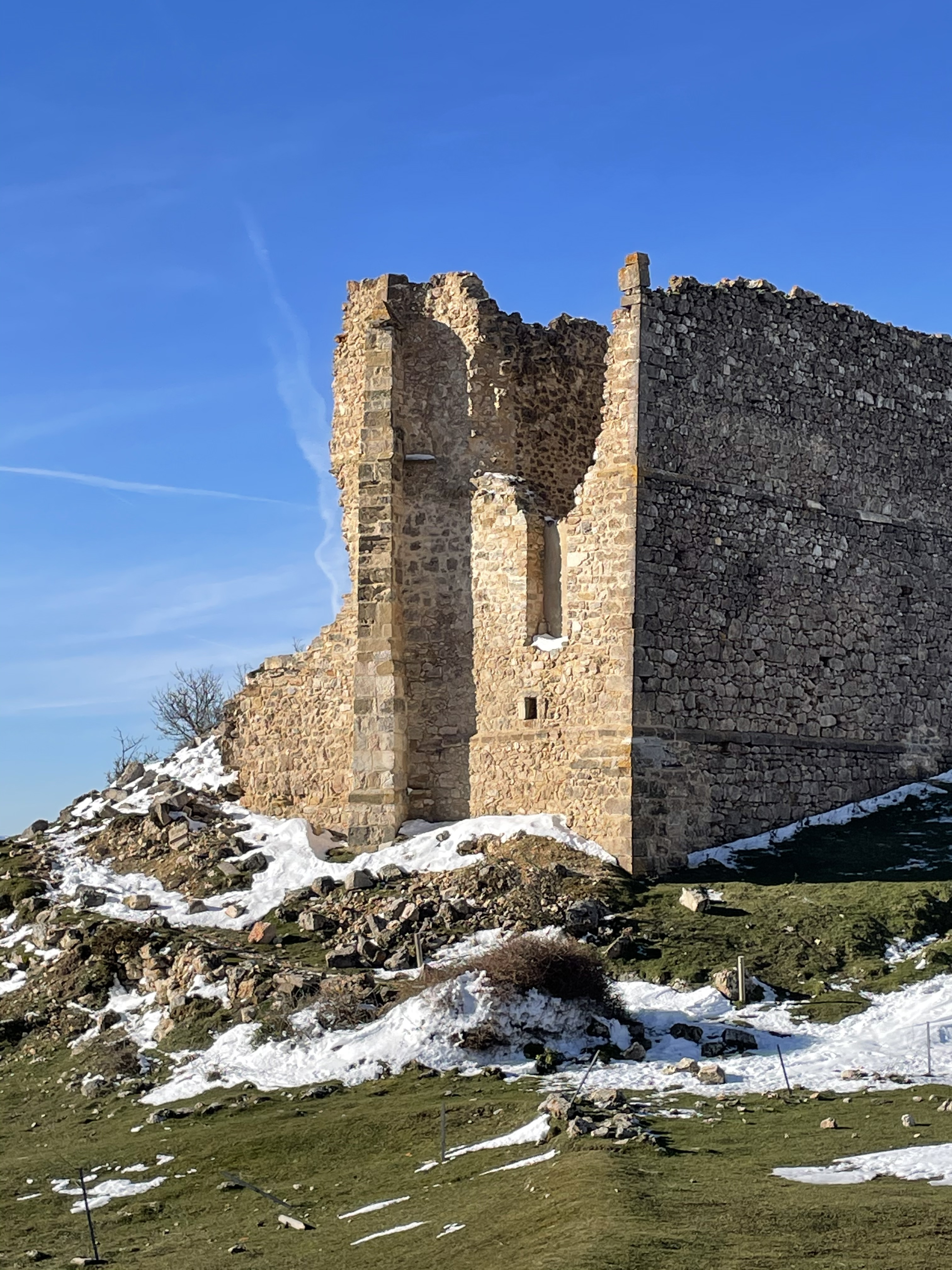
Ruins of the Monastery of Santa María de Toloño.

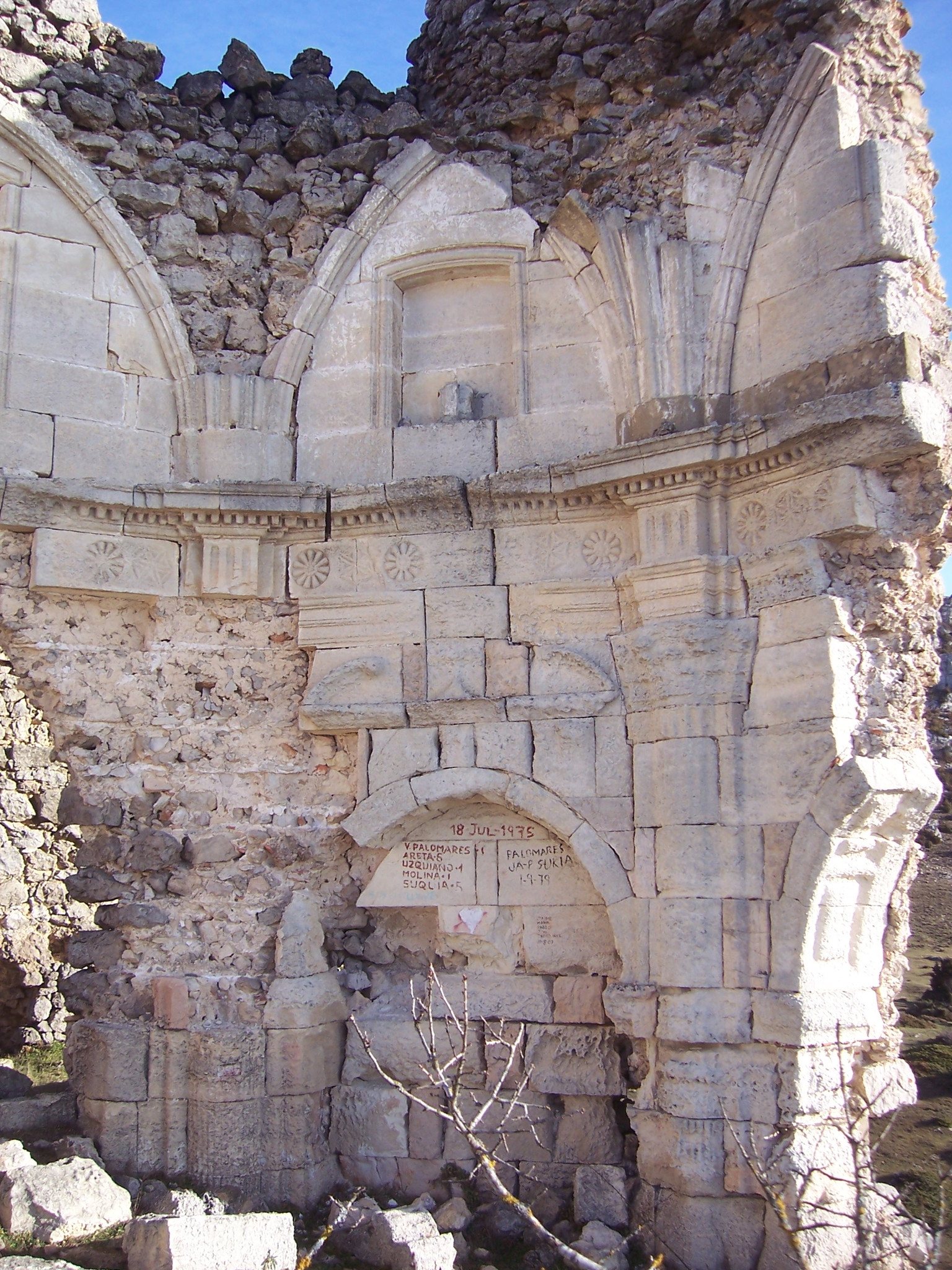
Chapel of the Monastery of Santa María de Toloño.

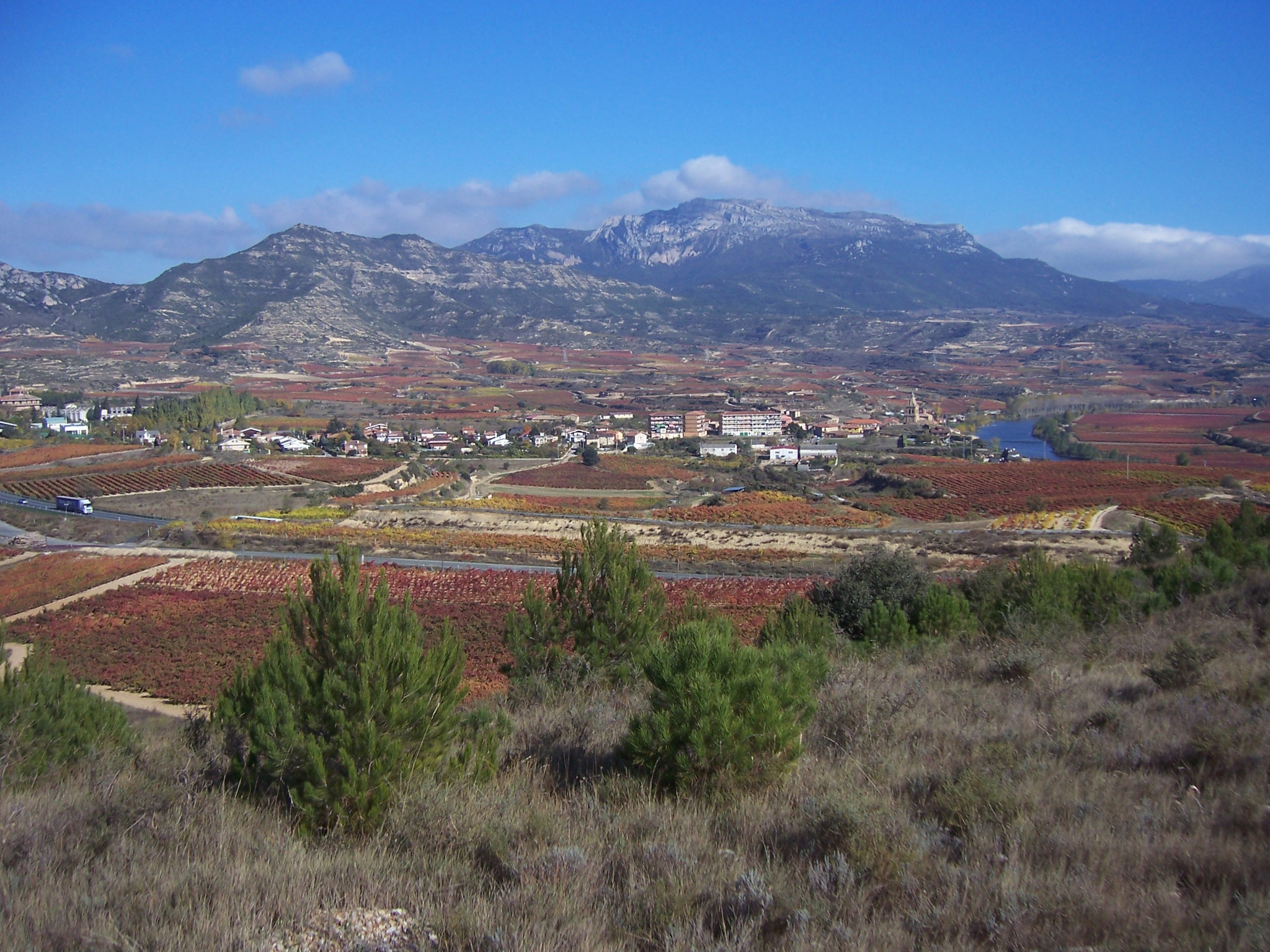
View of the Sierra de Toloño mountain range.

Santa María de Toloño, also known as Our Lady of los Ángeles, is a ruined Spanish monastery located in the Sierra de Toloño near Labastida, Álava. Constructed by the Hieronymites, the monastery was destroyed in the First Carlist War and only a few walls remain.

== History ==
The sanctuary is located in a meadow at 1,201 metres (3,940 ft) above sea level. It was built by the Hieronymites between the 14th and 15th centuries, and abandoned in 1422 due to harsh weather. Later, it was affiliated with the Hermandad de la Divisa (Brotherhood of the Currency) until the end of 18th century. In 1835, during the First Carlist war, it suffered a fire that left only a part of the Baroque chapel standing.

== Architecture and fittings ==
The building was well-constructed, with church, camarín and sacristía. Its retablo mayor were of white stone. There were 22 rooms, five kitchens, separate rooms for a chaplain, two hermits and a servant, as well as a meeting room for the Divisa.
