= Walls of Salinillas de Buradón =

- Murallas de Salinillas de Buradón (Spanish); Gatzaga Buradongo harresiak (Basque)
- Salinillas de Buradón, Álava, Basque Country, Spain
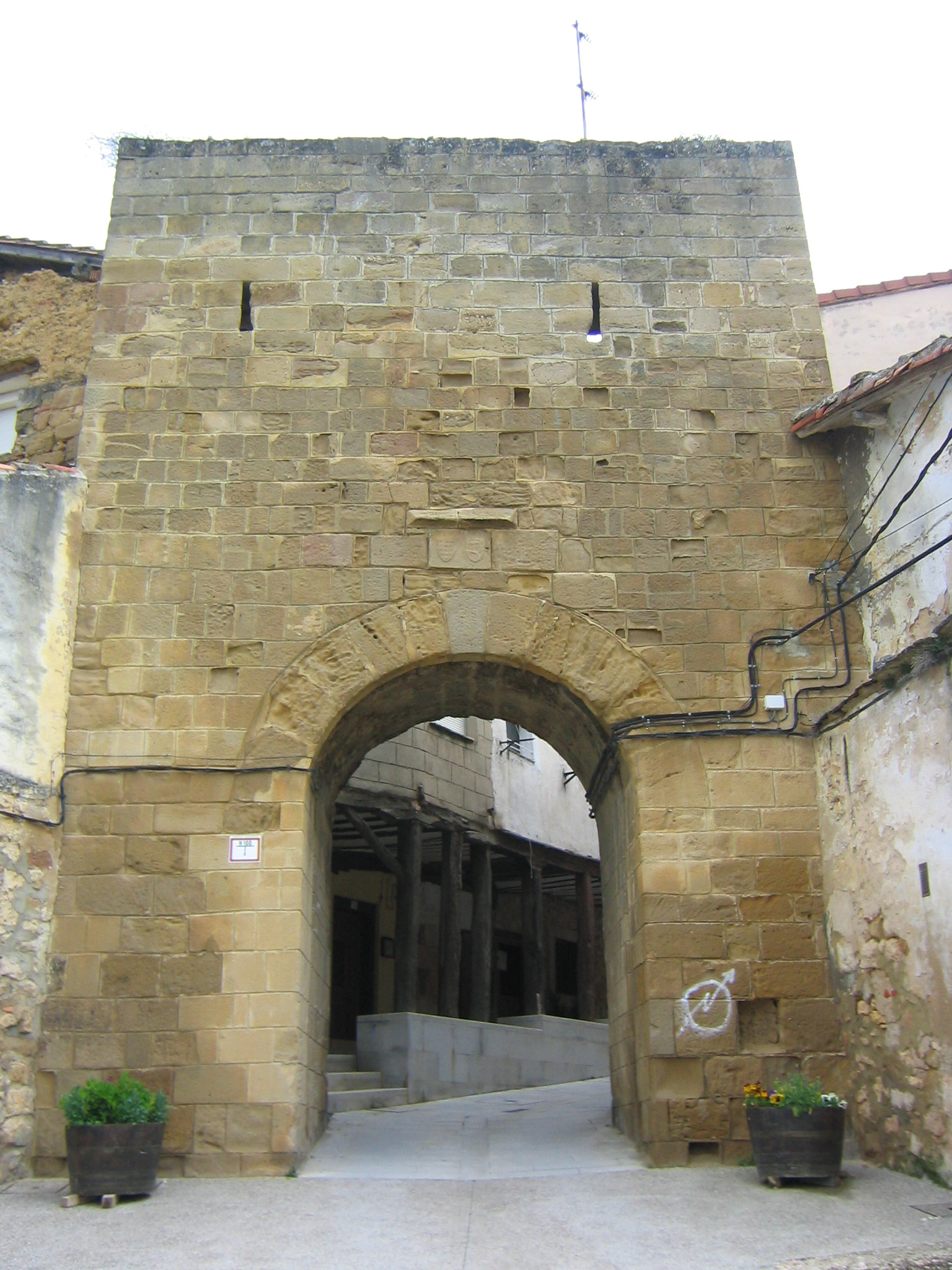
- One of the gates in the wall

Site information
- Type: Medieval fortification

Location
- Coordinates: 42°38′N 2°50′W

Spanish Cultural Heritage
- Official name: Murallas de Salinillas de Buradon
- Type: Non-movable
- Criteria: Monument
- Designated: 1984
- Reference no.: RI-51-0005115

The Walls of Salinillas de Buradón (Spanish: Murallas de Salinillas de Buradón, Basque: Gatzaga Buradongo harresiak) are walls located in Salinillas de Buradón, in the municipality of Labastida, Álava, Basque Country, Spain. It was declared Bien de Interés Cultural in 1984.
