= Toloño =

Mountain range in Spain

Coordinates: 42°37′26″N 2°45′46″W

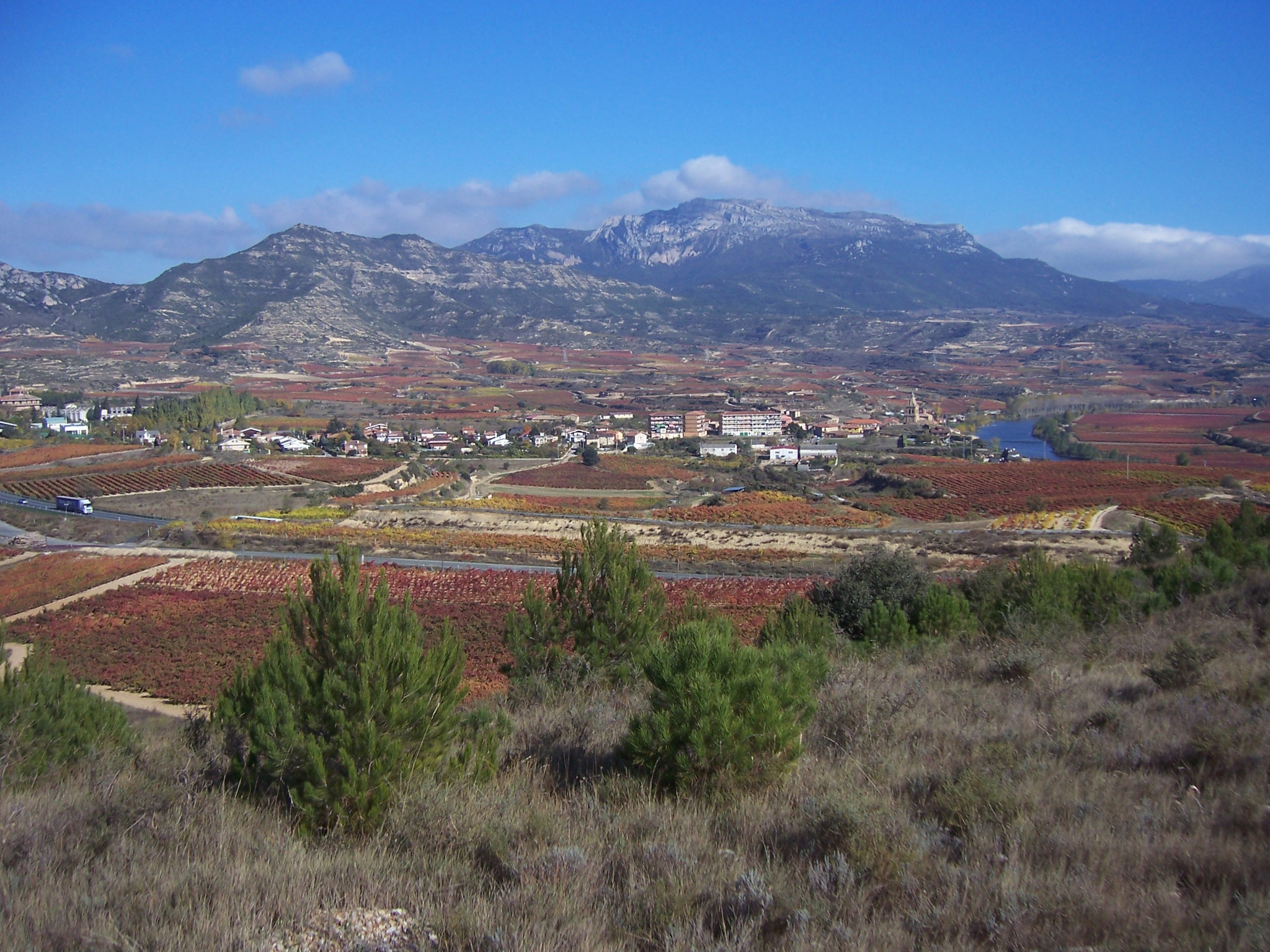
View of the Sierra de Toloño and the village of Briñas

The Toloño (Basque: Toloño mendilerroa; Spanish: Sierra del Toloño), also known as the Sierra de Cantabria, is a mountain range in the province of Álava in the Basque Country in northern Spain.

From the west, the range rises from the Conchas de Haro where the River Ebro enters the region of La Rioja at 445 metres above sea level, and from there runs east forming the northern border of the Rioja Alavesa, separating the Rioja region from the rest of Álava. Its highest point is Mount Toloño at 1271 metres above sea level in the municipality of Labastida.

It is noted for its steep rock faces on the southern side, and extensive forests in the north. The range is a landmark visible throughout the region.

== The name ==
The Basque official name is Toloñoko mendilerroa, while in Spanish it is Sierra del Toloño. In Spanish, Sierra de Cantabria can be used too as a name, but the Instituto Geografico Nacional (Spanish National Geographic Institute) changed the official name in 2018.

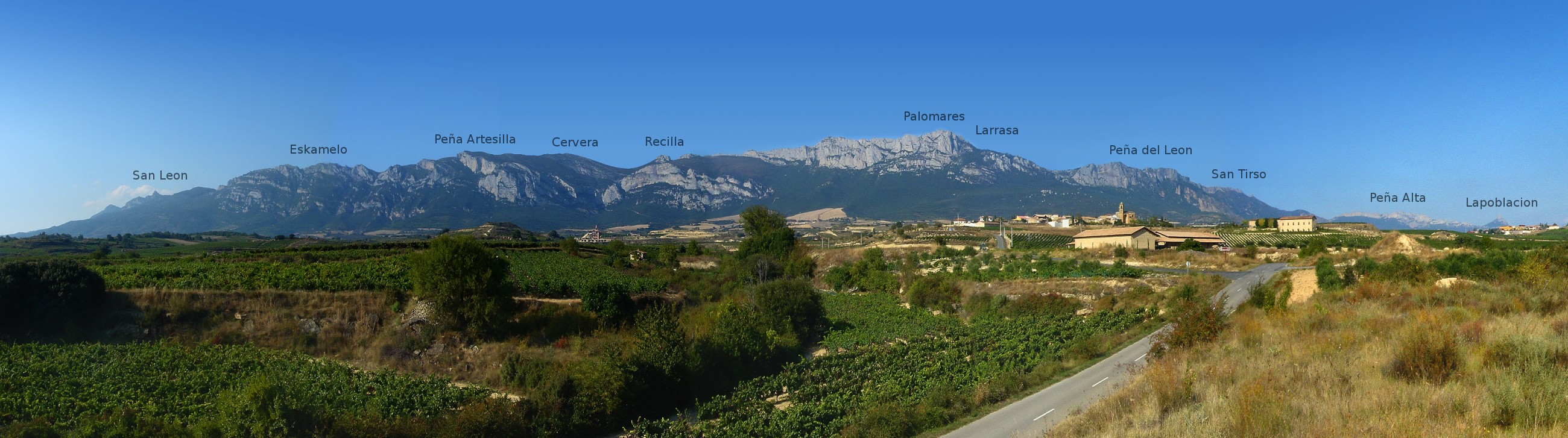
Panorama of the Sierra de Cantabria

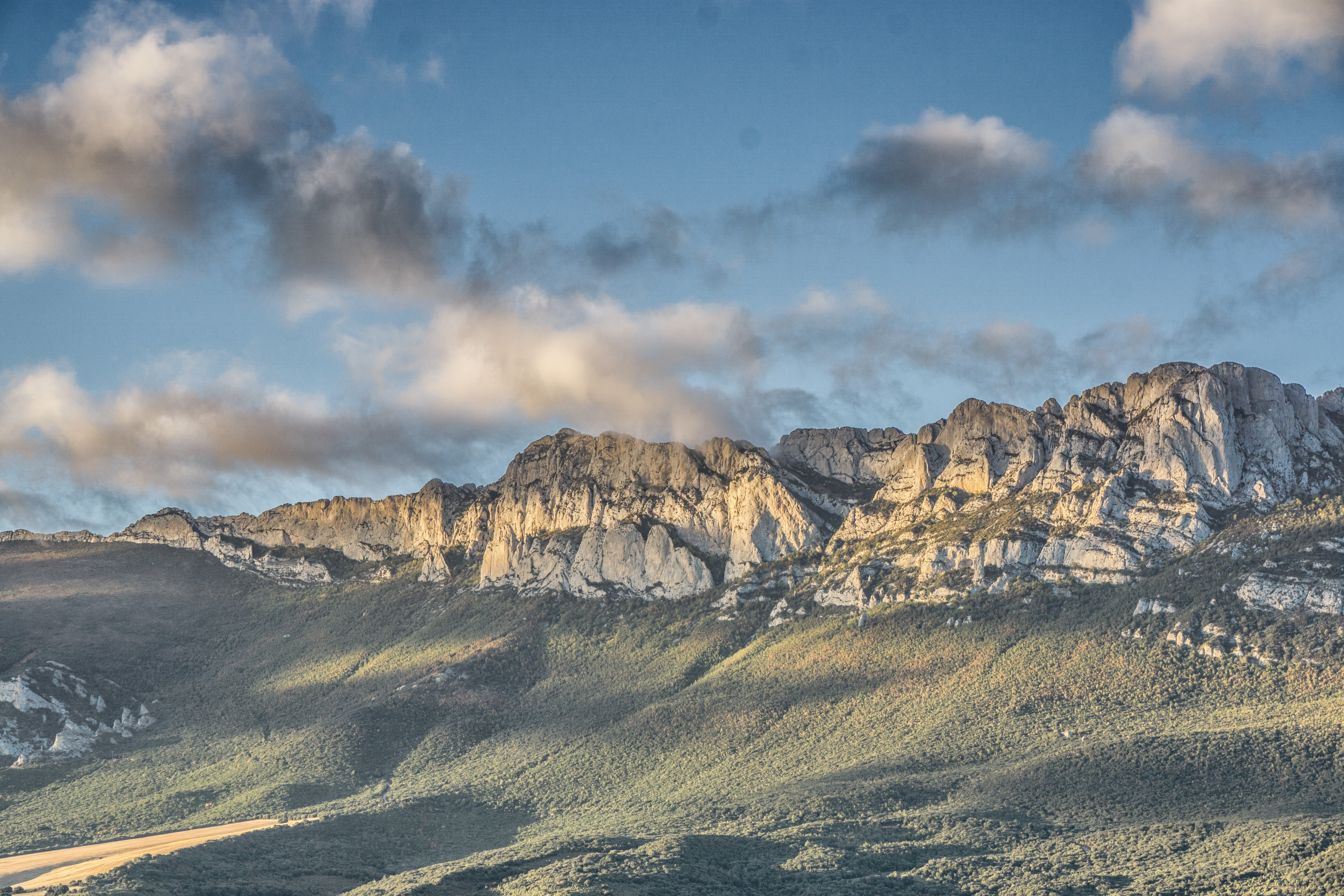
Sierra de Cantabria seen from Laguardia, Álava

== Peaks ==
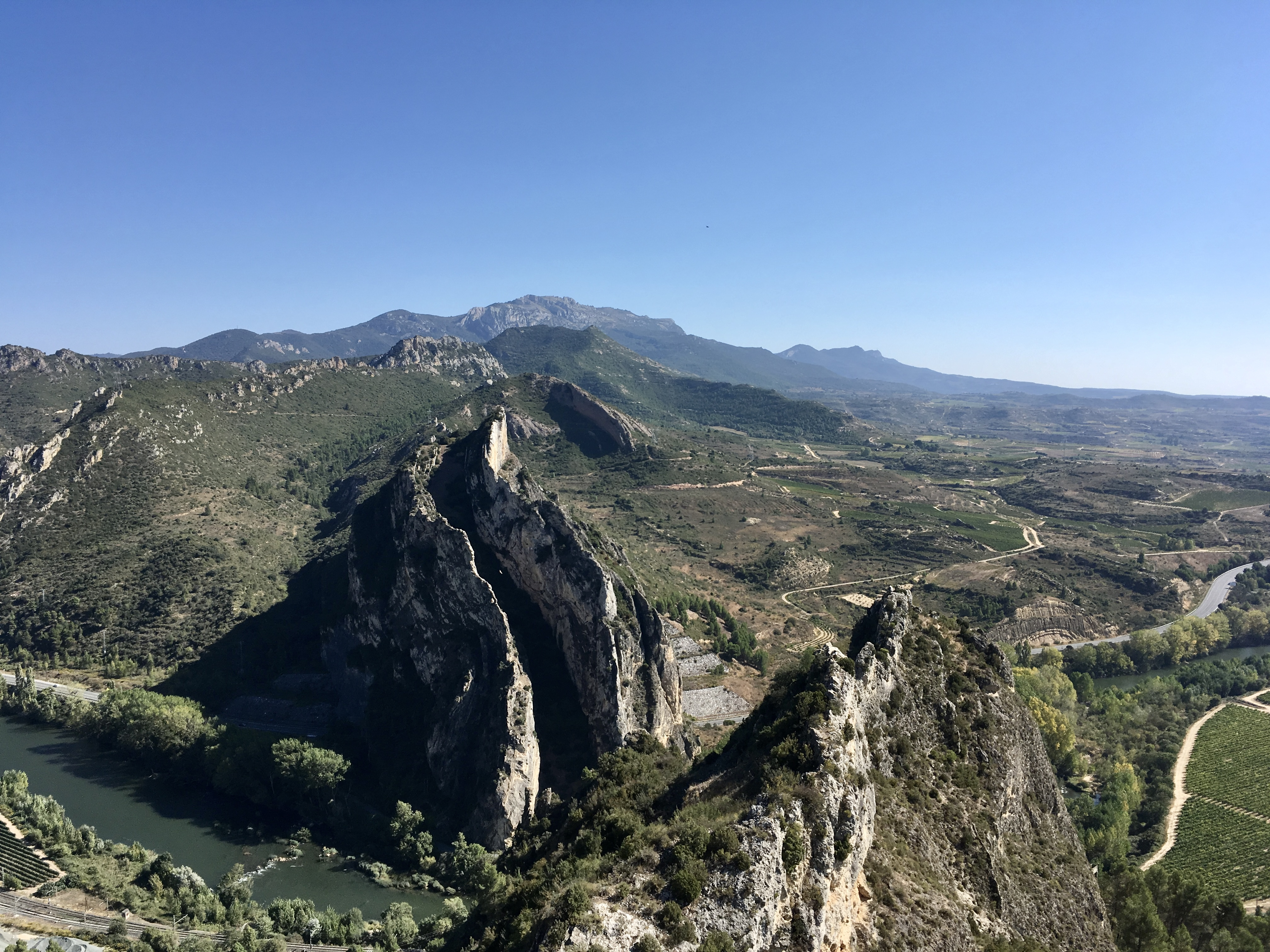
In the foreground, Las Conchas de Haro and the River Ebro, behind which rises the Sierra de Toloño with the summit of Toloño in the background

From west to east:

- Peña Las Doce (1252 m): "twelve o'clock peak", the name comes from the shadow it creates at midday.
- La Tortuga (1255 m): "the tortoise", named for the shape of the rock at its peak.
- Peña del Castillo (1262 m): so called because a small castle was once situated here. Access is difficult.
- Toloño (1271 m): some 20 metres further to the east of this peak is the border with the province of La Rioja.
- Peña del León (1206 m): part of La Rioja
- Azkorri or Colorada (1218 m)

== Fauna ==
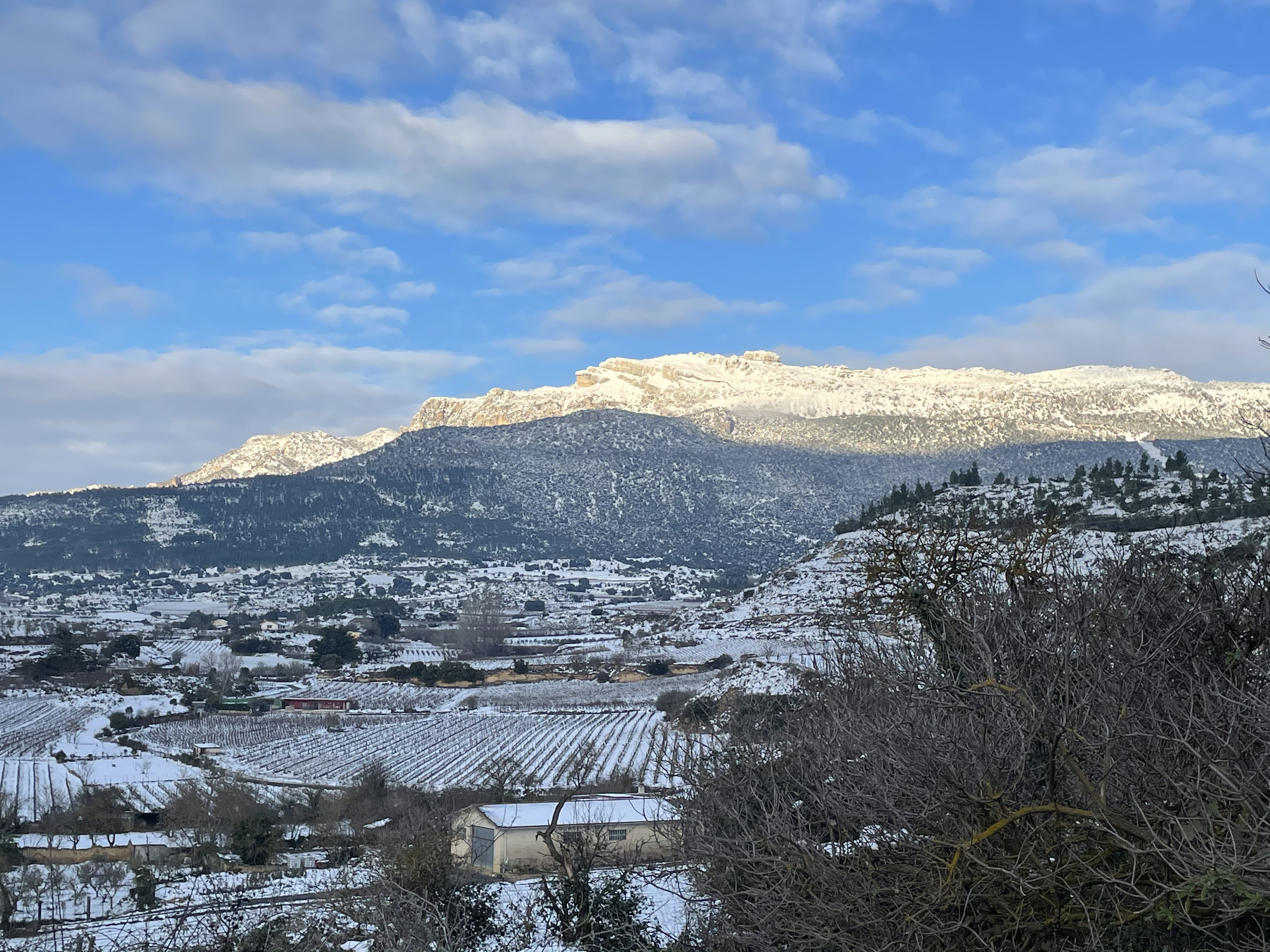
Mount Toloño seen from Labastida with snow in January 2021

The mountain range, together with the Obarenes Mountains, form an EU special protection area for birds of prey. Resident species in these mountains include the golden eagle, peregrine falcon, Griffon vulture, Egyptian vulture, Eurasian eagle-owl, Bonelli's eagle, red kite and common kestrel.

Other larger mammals such as the roe deer, red fox and wild boar can occasionally be seen. At least 68 species of flowering plants have been identified.

== Monastery of Santa María del Toloño ==
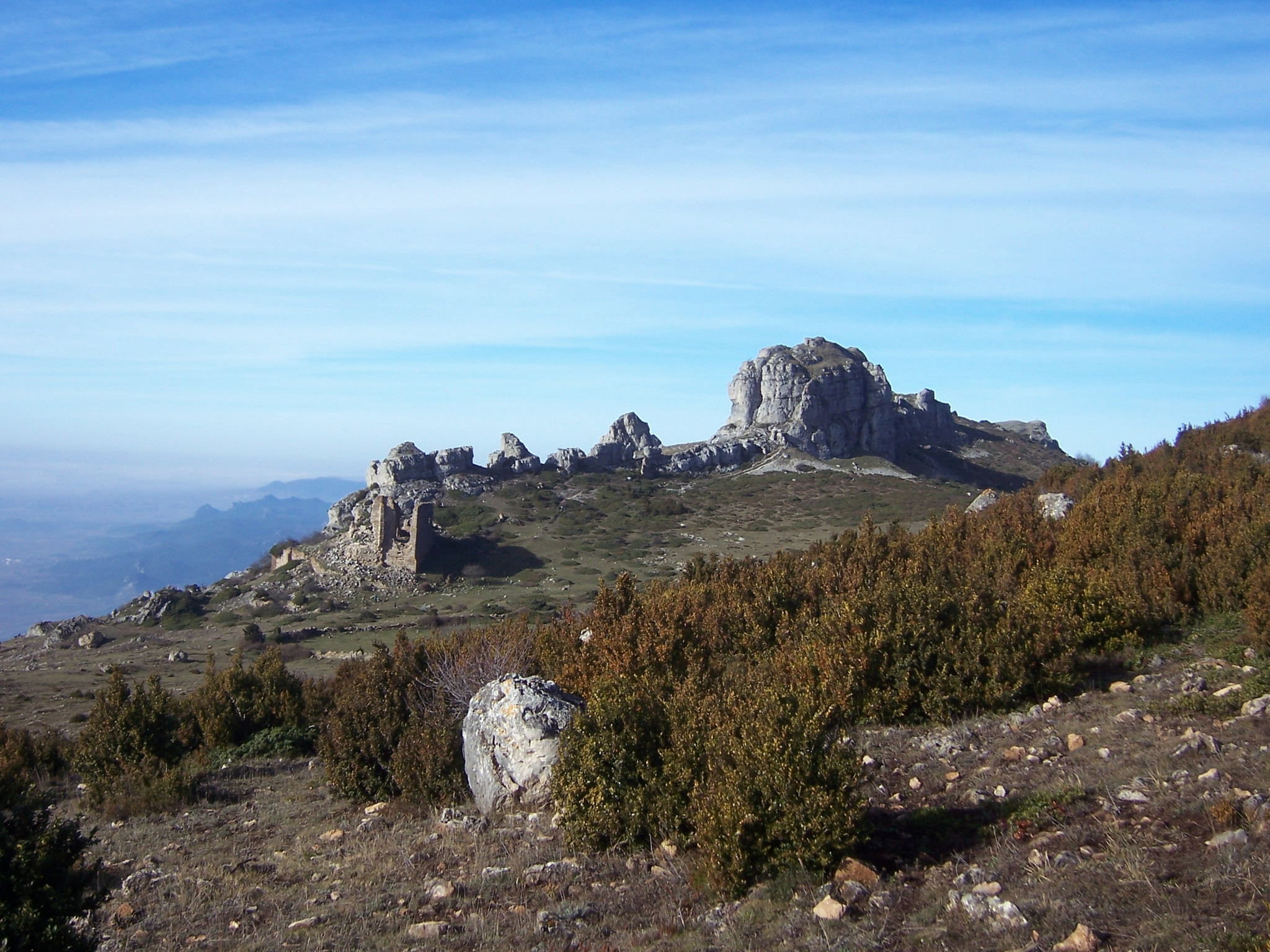
Ruins of the monastery of Santa María de Toloño and Peña del castillo seen from the summit of Toloño

The ruins of the Monastery of Santa María de Toloño are located in a meadow at 1201 metres above sea level. It was abandoned in 1422.
