= Salinillas de Buradón =

Hamlet in Álava, Spain

Salinillas de Buradon/Buradon Gatzaga
- Concejo
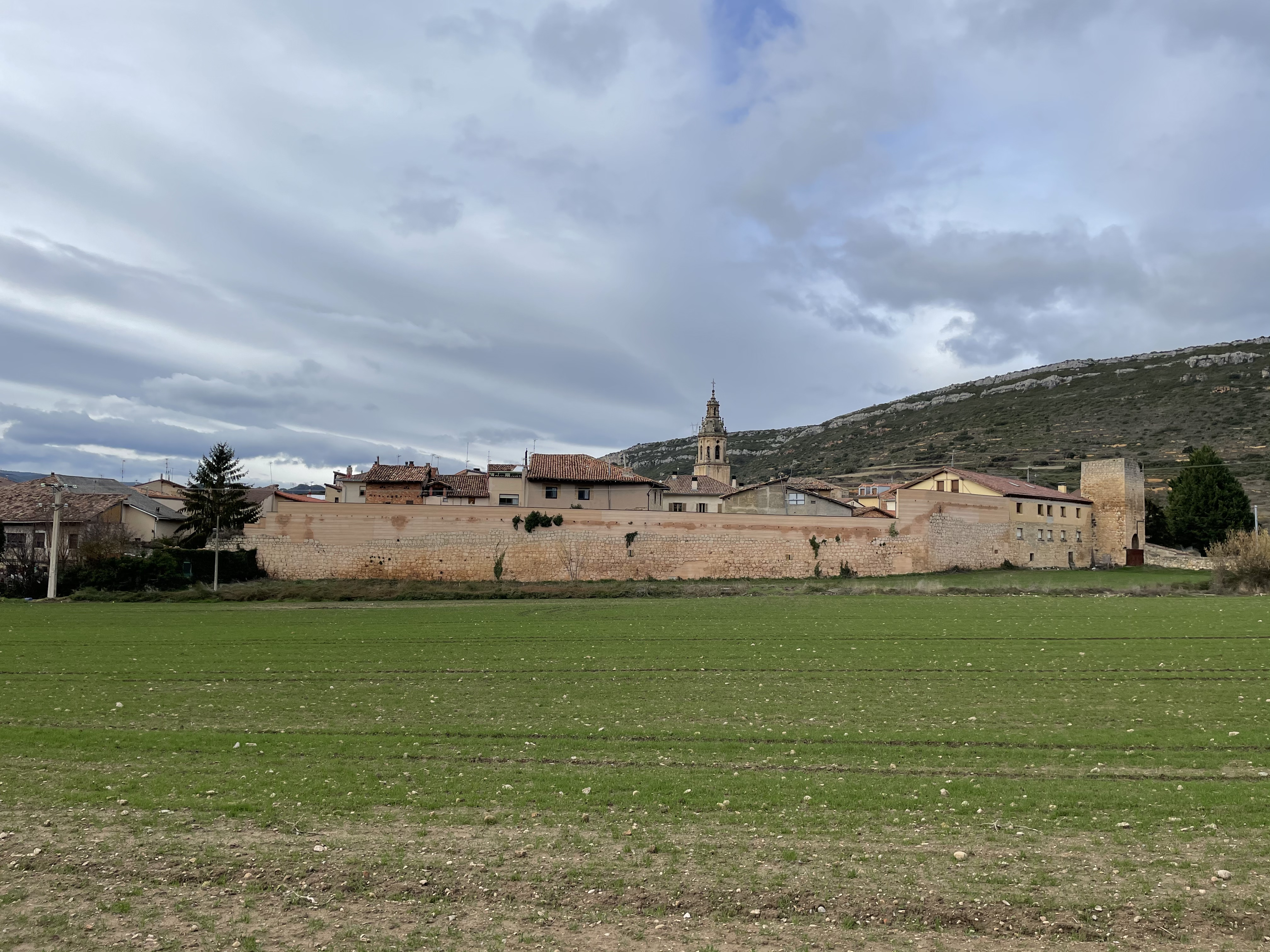
- View of Salinillas de Buradón, with its medieval walls visible

- Coat of arms

- Location within Álava Location within the Basque Country Location within Spain
- Coordinates: 42°38′N 2°50′W
- Country: Spain
- Autonomous community: Basque Country
- Province: Álava
- Comarca: Rioja Alavesa
- Municipality: Labastida
- Founded: 1264

Area
  - Total: 11.25 km^{2} (4.34 sq mi)
- Elevation: 504 m (1,654 ft)

Population (2022)
  - Total: 119
  - Density: 10.6/km^{2} (27.4/sq mi)
- Postal code: 01212

Salinillas de Buradón (Spanish pronunciation: [saliˈniʝas ðe βuɾaˈðon]) or Gatzaga Buradon (Basque pronunciation: [gats̻aɣa βuɾaðon]) is a village and concejo located in the municipality of Labastida, in Álava province, Basque Country, Spain. It was an independent municipality until 1974, when it was absorbed into Labastida.

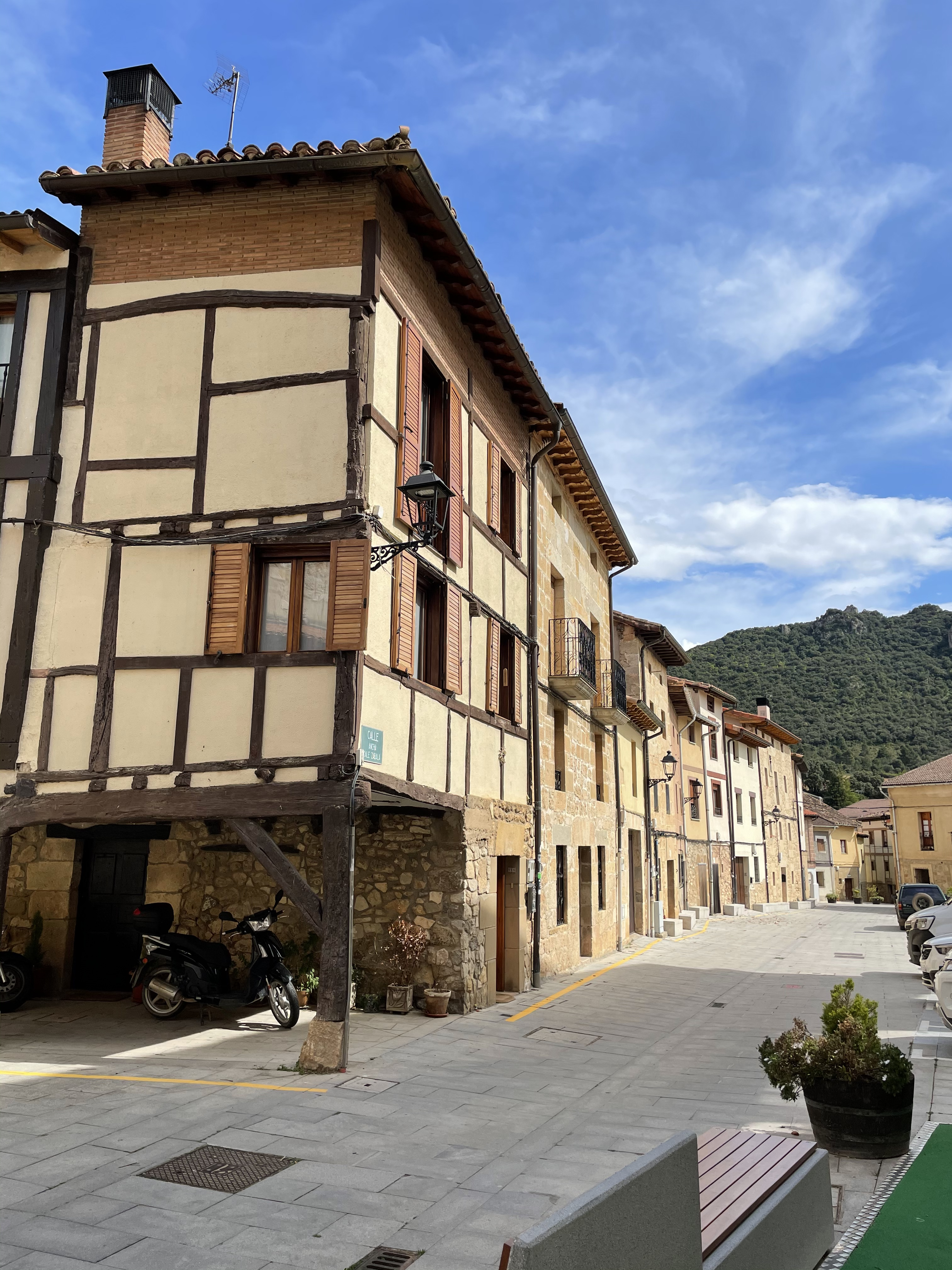
Street within the walls of Salinillas de Buradón

It is noteworthy for its well-preserved medieval walls and historic town centre, and its location sheltered between hills overlooking the River Ebro.
