= Labastida =

Labastida / Bastida
- Municipality
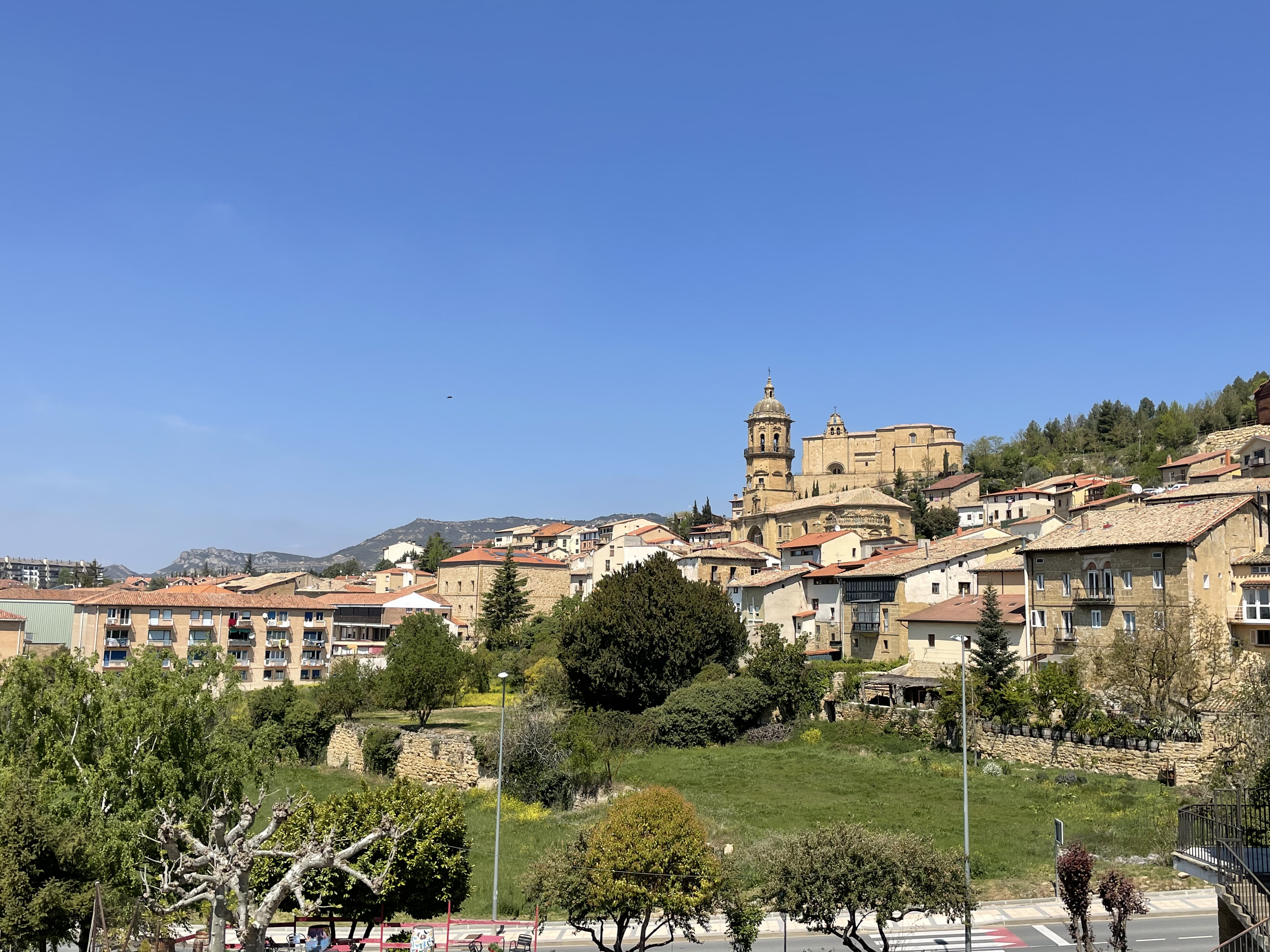
- Labastida seen from the east

- Flag Coat of arms

- Location of Labastida within the Basque Country Labastida / Bastida (the Basque Country) Labastida / Bastida (Spain)
- Coordinates: 42°35′25″N 2°47′45″W
- Country: Spain
- Autonomous community: Basque Country
- Province: Alava
- Eskualdea / Comarca: Rioja Alavesa
- Founded: 1196

Government
  - Mayor: Laura Pérez Borinaga (Basque Nationalist Party)

Area
  - Total: 38.17 km^{2} (14.74 sq mi)

Population (2014)
  - Total: 1,489
  - Density: 39.01/km^{2} (101.0/sq mi)
- Time zone: UTC+1 (CET)
  - Summer (DST): UTC+2 (CEST)
- Postal code: 01330
- Official language(s): Basque, Spanish
- Website: Official website

Labastida in Spanish or Bastida in Basque is a town and municipality of the Rioja Alavesa, in the province of Álava in the Basque Country, northern Spain. It is located between the River Ebro and the Sierra de Toloño mountain range, 4 km east of the city of Haro and 30 km south of the Basque capital Vitoria-Gasteiz.

== History ==
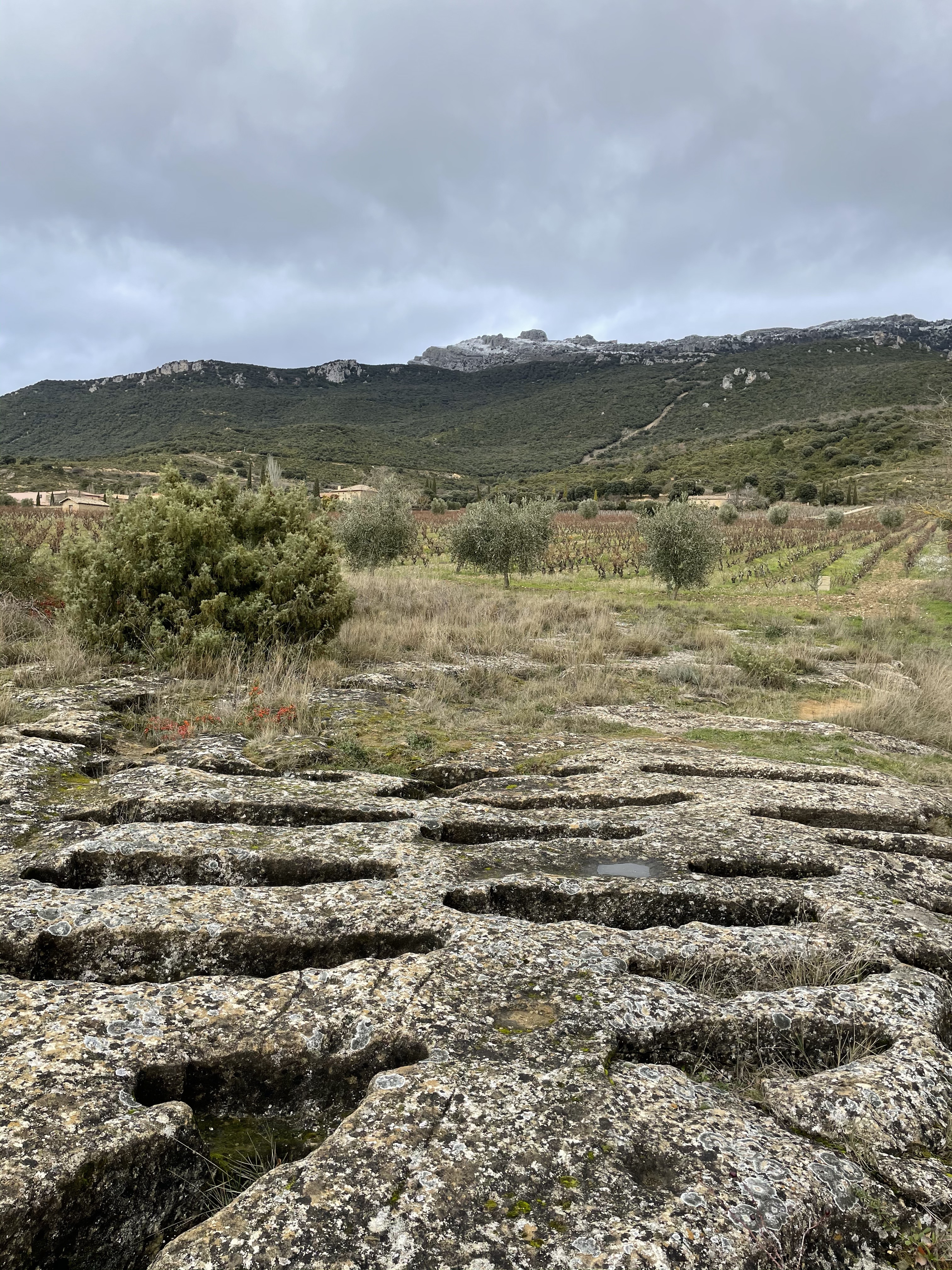
Necropolis of Remelluri, Labastida

The presence of dolmens and neolithic cemeteries indicate the long human history of this region. An archeological site in Salinillas de Buradón shows evidence of a pre-Roman Celtic settlement of Berones, who migrated to the region in the 4th century BC.

The hermitage of Santa Lucia dates to the 9th century, while the necropolis of Remelluri, where some 300 tombs are carved out of bare rock, is thought to date to the 10th century. While the majority are Christian, Islamic burials also took place here, when the region was part of Moorish Al-Andalus. This Muslim presence diminished after the reconquista, when the village became part of the Kingdom of Navarre. From this period, during the so-called repoblación (repopulation), settlers arrived from the Christian kingdoms of Navarra and Castile, speaking Basque and Spanish respectively, while a Jewish community also continued living in the village, giving the name of the Jewish Quarter to the part of the town around Plaza del Olmo. Today wine cellars under this neighbourhood occupy the tunnels and caves where the Jewish community conducted their ceremonies privately.

In the medieval period, Labastida was a substantial fortified town. It occupied an important position close to the River Ebro and at a junction on routes between Burgos, Pamplona and the Basque coast, and as a result the town changed hands constantly between Navarra and Castile from the tenth to thirteenth centuries. Finally and definitively it became part of Álava in the 16th century.

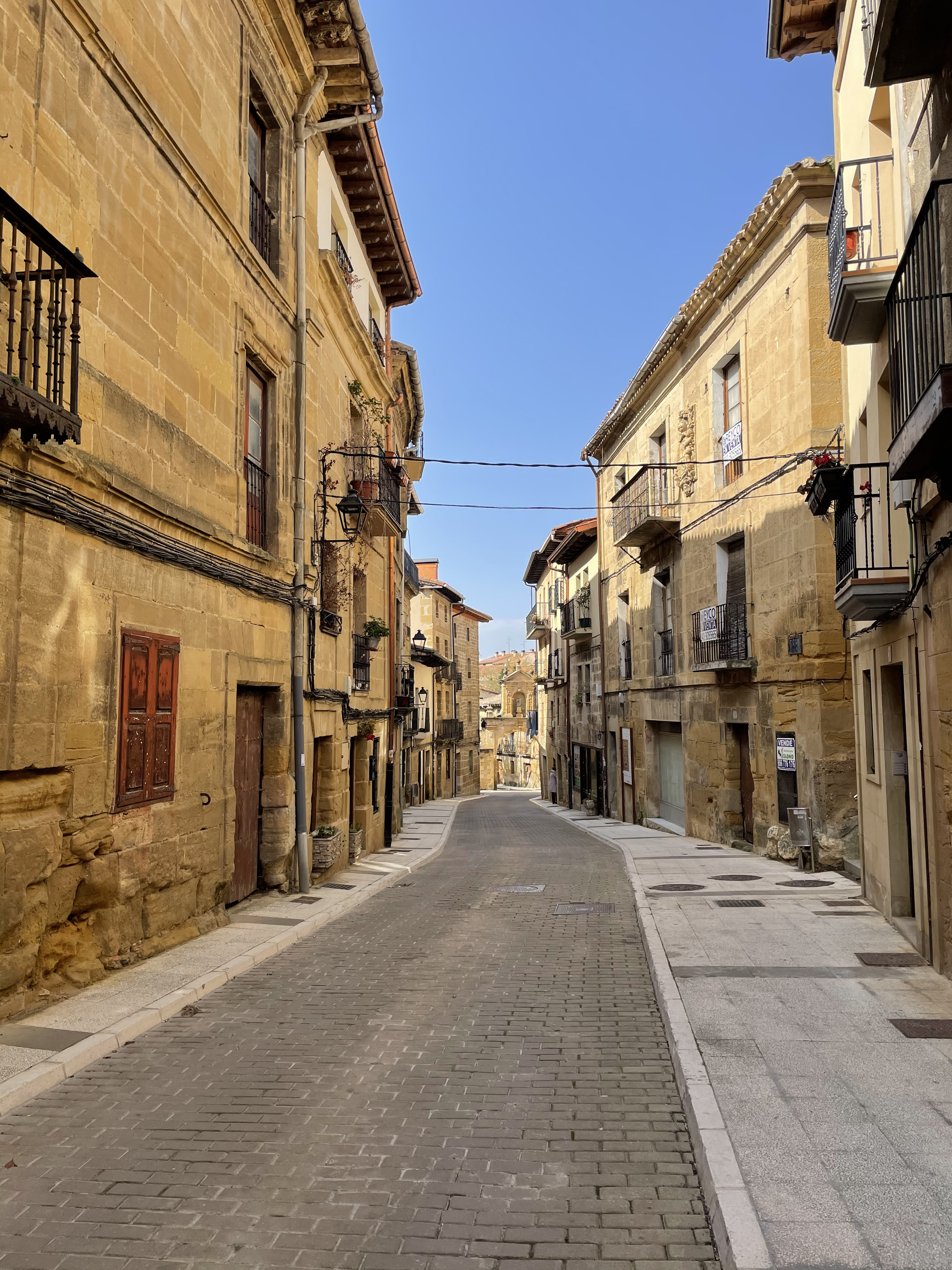
A view of the main street, with palaces lining the route from the main square to one of the old entrances to the town, the Arco de Larrazuría

It was in this period that the town found great wealth and prosperity. A large number of palaces were constructed in the Calle Mayor, where 29 stone coats of arms are still visible carved into their façades, as well as the new classical church, Our Lady of the Assumption, built in the 16th and 17th centuries and decorated in an opulent Baroque style.

Manuel Quintano (1756-1818), winemaker and resident of the town, is credited with bringing the Bordeaux winemaking style to La Rioja after studying in France. In 1808, Napoleon Bonaparte passed through Labastida, where he stayed at the Paternina Palace.

== Geography ==
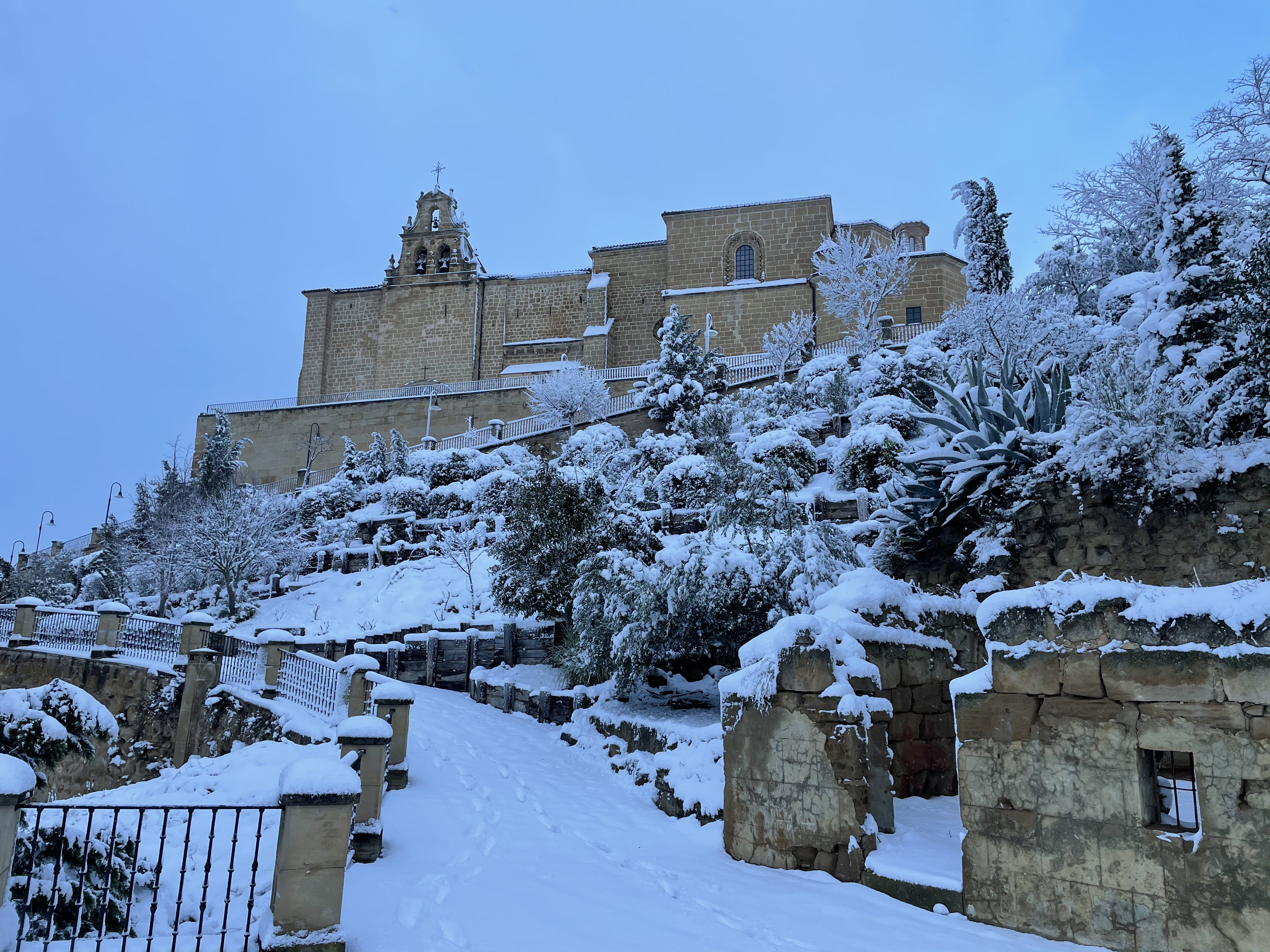
The hermitage of Santo Cristo with snow, January 2021

The town is at 529m altitude, and is positioned between the River Ebro and the Sierra de Toloño mountain range.

While Labastida falls within the specifications of a temperate oceanic climate, there are strong continental and Mediterranean influences. Annual rainfall of 733mm is low for the Basque Country and there is notably higher rainfall in spring and autumn. Winters are cool, though snowfalls are rare, while summers are hot and dry.

== Economy ==
Located in the Rioja Alavesa wine region, the principal industry of the town is winemaking. Lagares or stone wine presses dating back to at least the tenth century have been found in the town and the surrounding countryside, showing that this has been the mainstay of the region for over a thousand years. Today there are still a large number of wineries in and around the town. Associated industries include tourism and other agricultural products.

== Facilities ==
The town council maintains a sports centre, fronton and public swimming pools. In the Quintano Palace by the town hall can be found the cultural centre, which contains the tourism office, library, games and music rooms and other community facilities.

The town has a school, a walk-in health clinic, various shops, hotels and guesthouses and a wide range of bars and restaurants.

== Localities ==
The walled village of Salinillas de Buradón (Basque: Buradon Gatzaga) is located 6 km north west of Labastida and was absorbed into the municipality of Labastida in the 1970s.

Other locations within the municipality include the hamlet of Remelluri, today a winery, as well as the long-abandoned villages of Tabuérniga, Torrontejo and Buradón.

== Places of interest ==
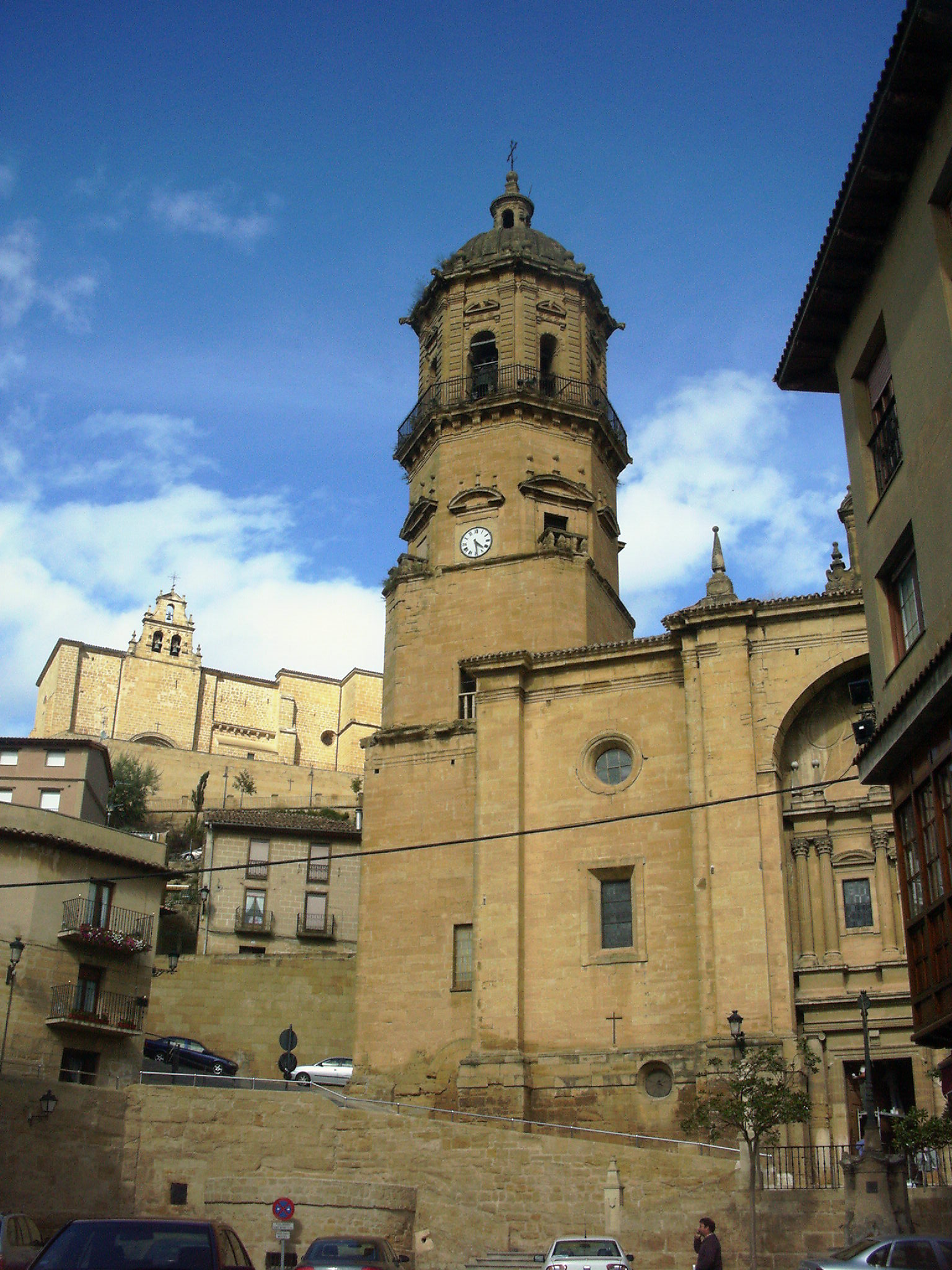
Our Lady of the Assumption, with the hermitage of Santo Cristo behind

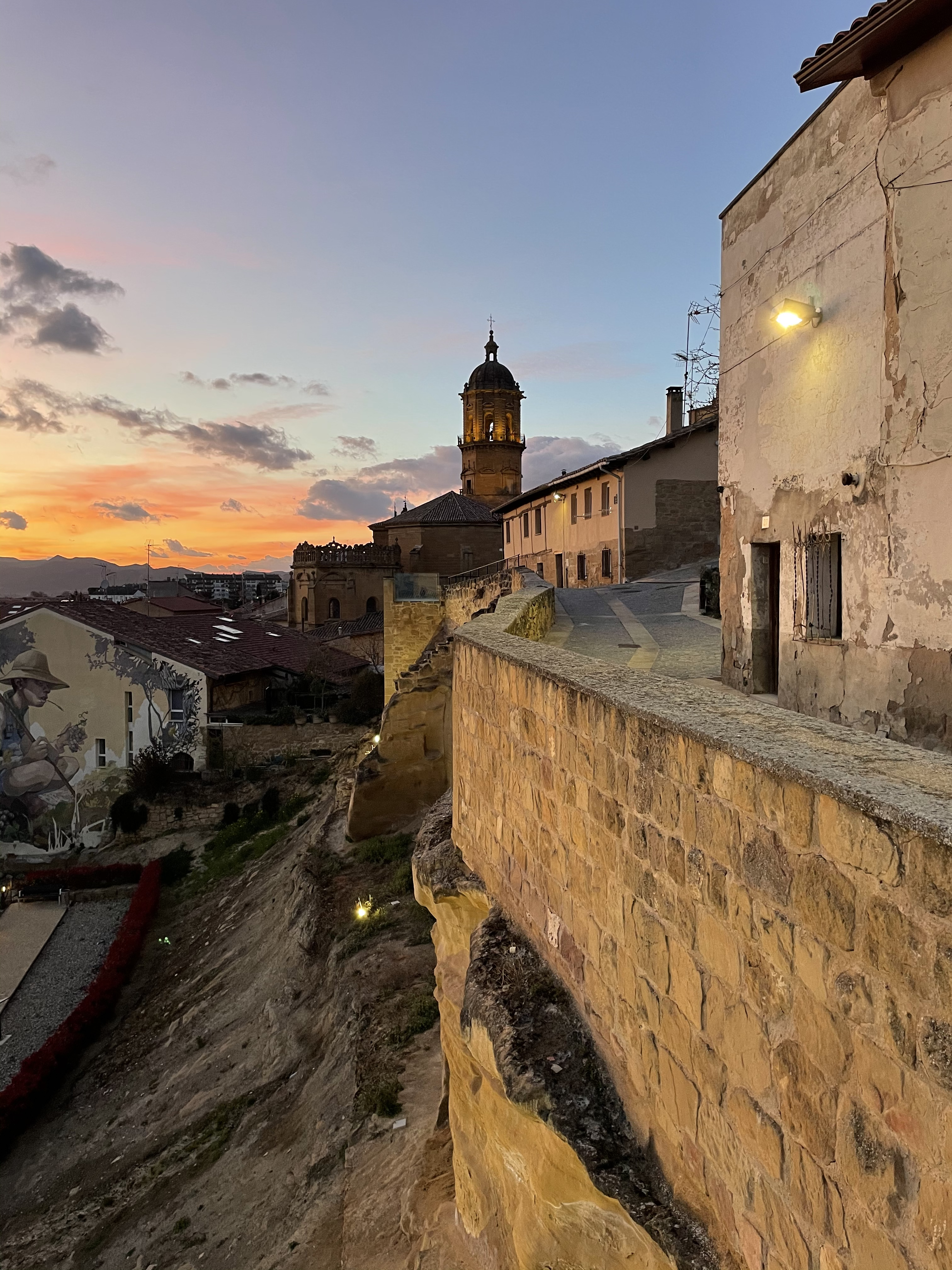
Part of the town walls of Labastida

- The church of Our Lady of the Assumption: built in the 16th century, with Baroque interior, overlooking the main square, Plaza de la Paz. The Baroque sacristy was added in the 18th century. The tower is 54m tall.
- The hermitage of Santo Cristo the oldest church in the town located at its highest point. Dates from the 12th century.
- Casa Consistorial, this palace is today the town hall, built between 1730 and 1745.
- Town walls
- Palaces in the Calle Mayor
- Arco del Toloño and Arco de Larrazuría, the two surviving gateways into the town.
- Park of San Ginés, and from here many walking trails in the Sierra de Toloño including the track to the summit and the abandoned Monastery of Santa María de Toloño
- San Andrés de Muga aquaduct
