= Golden Mile =

Golden Mile or The Golden Mile may refer to:

== Places ==
=== Africa ===
- Golden Mile, Durban, Durban, South Africa

=== Asia ===
- Golden Mile Complex, a residential and commercial building in Kallang, Singapore
- Golden Mile Project (Vijayawada), India's longest smart street on M.G. Road
- Nathan Road, Kowloon, Hong Kong

=== Europe ===
- Golden Mile, Castile and Leon, Spain
- Golden Mile (Moscow), Khamovniki District, Moscow, Russia
- Golden Mile (Rhineland-Palatinate), a fertile plain near Remagen, Germany

==== United Kingdom ====
- Golden Mile, Arbroath, Angus, Scotland; an historic-district route running from Arbroath Abbey through the town to the harbour; it is the route of a Declaration Day (Tartan Day) parade organised since 2016
- Golden Mile (Belfast), Belfast, Northern Ireland
- Golden Mile (Blackpool), Blackpool, England
- Golden Mile (Brentford), Brentford, England
- Golden Mile (Leicester), Leicester, England

=== North America ===
- Golden Mile District, Hato Rey, San Juan, Puerto Rico, United States
- The Golden Mile, a section of the Baltimore Pike in Springfield Township, Delaware County, Pennsylvania, United States

==== Canada ====
- Golden Mile (Ontario), London Line 22 – the former Highway 7 – in Sarnia, Ontario
- Golden Mile, Toronto, in Scarborough, Toronto, Ontario
- Columbia Street (New Westminster), a street in New Westminster, British Columbia, nicknamed the Golden Mile

=== Oceania ===
- Golden Mile, Victoria, in Canterbury, Victoria, Australia
- Golden Mile, Western Australia, in Kalgoorlie, Western Australia, Australia
- Golden Mile, Wellington, New Zealand

== Other uses ==
- Golden Mile (POW camp), a US POW camp in Germany in World War II
- IAAF Golden Mile, a series of mile races from 1978 to 1981
- Underbelly: The Golden Mile, the third part of the Australian television series, set in Kings Cross
- The Golden Mile, a 1989 album by Workshy
- The Golden Mile, a 1996 album by UK band My Life Story
- The Golden Mile, a 2008 album by Welsh band The Peth
- The Golden Mile, a 2010 novel by Martin Cruz Smith
- The Golden Mile (angling), a term used by Recreational Sea Anglers (RSAs)
- The Golden Mile, a fictional pub crawl path used by the main characters in the 2013 film The World's End.
