= Golden Mile, Castile and Leon =

The Golden Mile (La Milla de Oro) is a term for a stretch of land that is home to a group of wineries in the province of Valladolid, Castile and Leon, Spain. Geographically they lay along the Duero river starting at Tudela de Duero in the west and continuing on until it reaches Peñafiel in the east along the N-122 motorway. The wineries associated include: Vega Sicilia, Pingus, Abadia Retuerta, Alión, Tr3smano, and Mauro. Among the grapes grown in the area are Tempranillo, Cabernet Sauvignon, and Syrah.
