= Dominio de Pingus =

Spanish winery in Valladolid

Dominio de Pingus is a Spanish winery located in Quintanilla de Onésimo in the Province of Valladolid with vineyards in La Horra area of the Ribera del Duero region. The estate's flagship wine, Pingus, is considered a "cult wine", sold at extremely high prices while remaining very inaccessible, and commands an average price of US$811 per bottle.

The winery also produces a second wine, Flor de Pingus, and a special cuvée, Ribera del Duero "Amelia". Recently, Dominio de Pingus has founded a joint project with local grape producers to make an old vine tempranillo called "PSI".

== History ==
Dominio de Pingus was established in 1995 by Danish oenologist Peter Sisseck, also manager of the Pesquera de Duero estate Hacienda Monasterio. On the estate's winemaking philosophies, Sisseck has stated, "The vines in my plots are very old. They have never been fertilised nor treated with pesticides and all grow following the traditional en vaso system. They are perfect."

About the first 1995 vintage of Pingus, Robert Parker declared, "One of the greatest and most exciting wines I have ever tasted". With a very limited first vintage production, only 325 cases were made with prices initially set at US$200 per bottle, it became yet more scarce when in November 1997 the ship transporting a U.S. bound shipment of 75 cases disappeared somewhere off the Azores in the North Atlantic Ocean. The shipwreck resulted in a dramatic reaction in the US market, with prices soon rising to $495 per bottle.

At the Ronda WineCreator conference of April 2008, Sisseck was angered by suggestions by Decanter editor Guy Woodward that some winemakers make wines to suit the palates of certain critics. In response he called Woodward's remarks arrogant for implying winemakers do not have their own opinions, adding, "I don't even think it is possible to do this."

In 2007 it was announced that the Spanish government had approved plans to expand highway roads through the vineyards of Dominio de Pingus and other wineries, which was met with strong opposition by Sisseck who called it a "vengeful measure".

== Production ==
Planted with very old vines of Tinto Fino, i.e. Tempranillo, the vineyards are 2.5 hectares (6.2 acres) in Barrosso with vines exceeding 65 years and 1.5 hectares (3.7 acres) in San Cristobal with vines older than 70 years, and the unusually low average yield of 12 hL per hectare. Since 2000, the viticulture has been biodynamic. Of the annual production of Pingus there is typically less than 500 cases, though in poor vintages no Pingus is made.

The production of the second wine Flor de Pingus, also 100% Tempranillo, is made with fruit from rented vineyards in the La Horra zone, with vines older than 35 years. Since the 2005 vintage, the viticulture has been biodynamic. The annual production is on average 4,000 cases.

Additionally there has been the single barrel cuvée, Ribera del Duero "Amelia", made from a vineyard parcel of 100+ year old vines with an average yield of 10 hL per hectare, with biodynamic viticulture since its initial 2003 vintage. The 2005 vintage had a production of 25 cases.

"PSI" is a joint project based on fruit produced by local grape growers from old tempranillo vines. The goal is to help grape producers and save old vines. Project was founded in 2006, first vintage was 2007. Grape growers are encouraged to employ biodynamic or organic vineyard management practices. The wine is made by Peter Sisseck and Pablo Rubio and sold under producer name Bodegas y Viñedos Alnardo. Vinification takes place in large concrete vats and aging in concrete and wooden tanks and oak barrels. Production of PSI 2009 was 9,600 cases, PSI 2010 was 16,600 cases.
