= Bodegas Alejandro Fernández =

Bodegas Alejandro Fernández is a Spanish wine company consisting of four wineries (bodegas). Alejandro Fernandez first founded Pesquera Bodega in Ribera del Duero in 1972. Ribera del Duero was listed at denominación de origen status in 1982 largely as a result of his efforts to practice quality winemaking in the region, which was traditionally planted to sugarbeet and grain.

The vines are planted to low espalier trellises to absorb more heat from the ground, and grow in poor, well-drained soils composed of sand and gravel above a limestone and clay subsoil.
