= Valdeande =

- Municipality
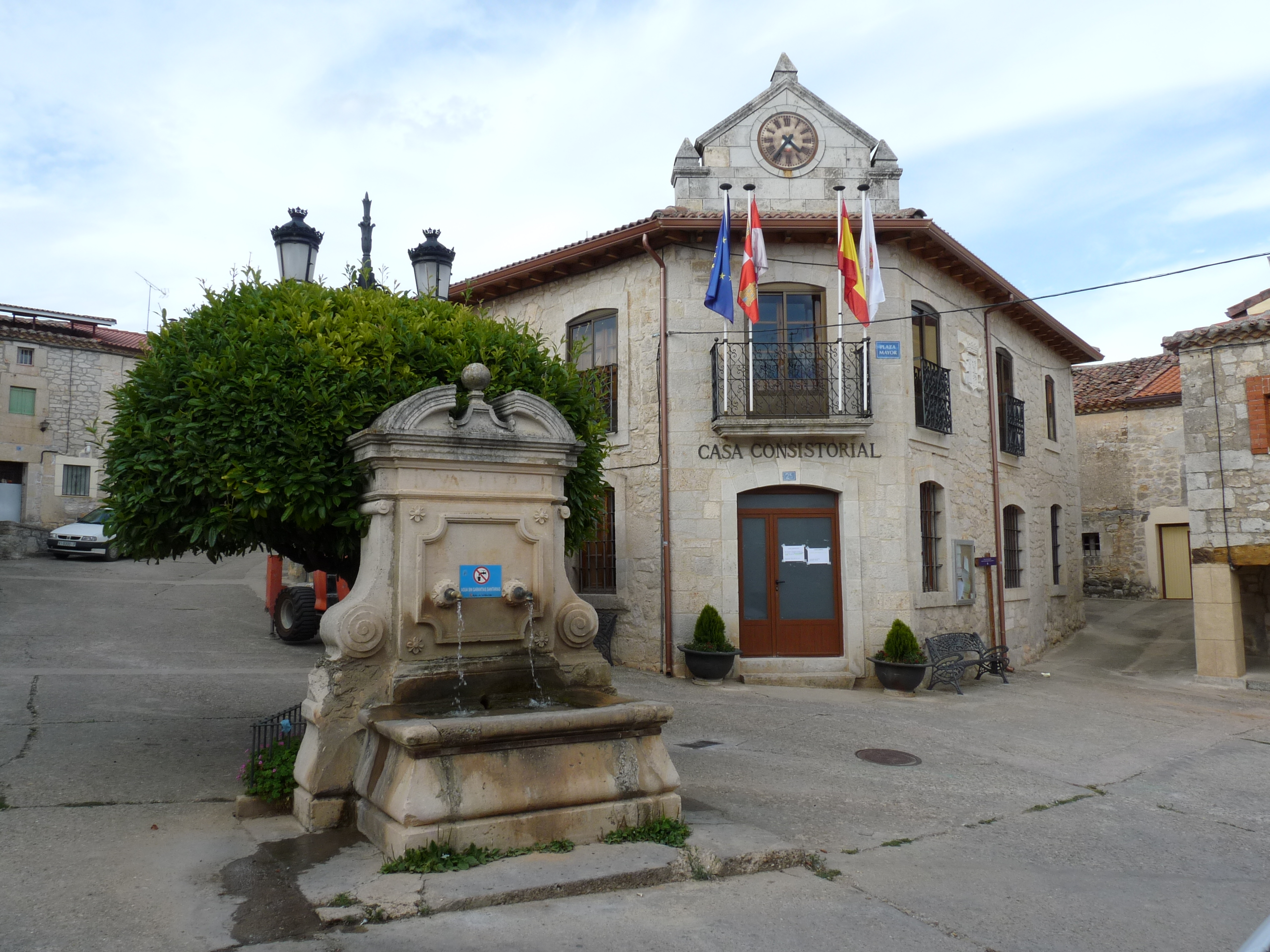
- Town hall

- Coat of arms

- Location in Spain
- Coordinates: 41°50′3″N 3°31′40″W
- Country: Spain
- Autonomous community: Castile and León
- Province: Burgos
- Comarca: Ribera del Duero
- Judicial district: Aranda de Duero
- Commonwealth: La Yecla

Government
  - Alcalde: Juan Abel Abejón Sancha (2007) (TC)

Area
  - Total: 30.985 km^{2} (11.963 sq mi)
- Elevation: 945 m (3,100 ft)

Population (2025-01-01)
  - Total: 103
  - Density: 3.32/km^{2} (8.61/sq mi)
- Demonym: valdeandino/a
- Time zone: UTC+1 (CET)
  - Summer (DST): UTC+2 (CEST)
- Postal code: 09453
- Official language(s): Spanish
- Website: Official website

Valdeande is a Spanish municipality in the province of Burgos in the autonomous community of Castile and León.

Valdeande is located on the north part of the shore of the Duero. It is situated 27 kilometers away from Aranda and 90 kilometers from other towns. The locality is closely tied to agriculture and has the Esgueva river as its main watercourse, which flows through the western part of the municipality, creating an extensive fertile valley.

In terms of history, various remains from the Roman period have been recognized as the oldest vestiges in the municipality. This territory was traversed by one of the routes that connected Clunia with the Arlanza river valley, and the villa of Ciella was located along this route. Other findings of crossings and traces also provide evidence of the possible existence of a small Hispano-Visigothic community in Valdeande. Valdeande also played a role in the Reconquista.

The first written document mentioning Valdeande dates back to 1037, in a manuscript by Fernando I of Castile. The village's strategic location made it an important place during historical events.

== Church of San Pedro Apostle ==
The church is prominently situated on a raised platform, built with finely crafted ashlar stone masonry. The current bell tower is believed to have originated from a fortified tower dating back to the 11th century. During the 13th century, the second level of the tower and the church porch were added. The construction of the church showcases a mixture of architectural styles, ranging from late Romanesque (seen in the porch) to Gothic (evident in the large windows) and Renaissance (seen in the main altar), continuing through to more recent times.

== Old source ==
The monument is situated in the elevated area of the town. It takes the form of a chapel and features an entrance to the spring through a double door consisting of twin arches with a pointed shape, separated by a column. Its origins can be traced back to the medieval period, although there is an inscription from the year 1703 that suggests a reconstruction took place at that time.

== Archaeological Classroom of the Ciella Deposit ==
The classroom is situated on the upper floor of the old schools building. The purpose of this project is to provide visitors with an authentic understanding of what this Roman rural settlement was and what it represented. The classroom is divided into two areas. The first area serves as a general information space, featuring audio-visual panels and scale models. The second area is a life-size reconstruction of some of the main rooms of the Roman mansion, allowing visitors to experience and visualize the living spaces firsthand.

== Ciella Deposit ==
To the northwest of Valdeande, there is a location where the fertile valley made use of the Esgueva river to establish a Roman rural mansion. This mansion served as the hub for a large agricultural operation. A road connected this area to the capital of the Roman Legal Convent, which was situated in Clunia, approximately 13 kilometers away.

== Goddess Madre ==
Additionally, a stone goddess-mother has been discovered, which is considered a significant archaeological finding in the area.

== Berruguete Altarpiece ==
The altarpiece of the church of San Pedro was painted in the second half of the 16th century, it is definitely worth a visit.

== Other places of interest ==
The Hermitage of the Virgin of the Juncal, municipal swimming pools, and the celebrations on June 29 in honor of San Pedro Apóstol and on June 15 in honor of the Virgin of Juncal are significant attractions and events in the area.
