= Abacela =

American winery estate

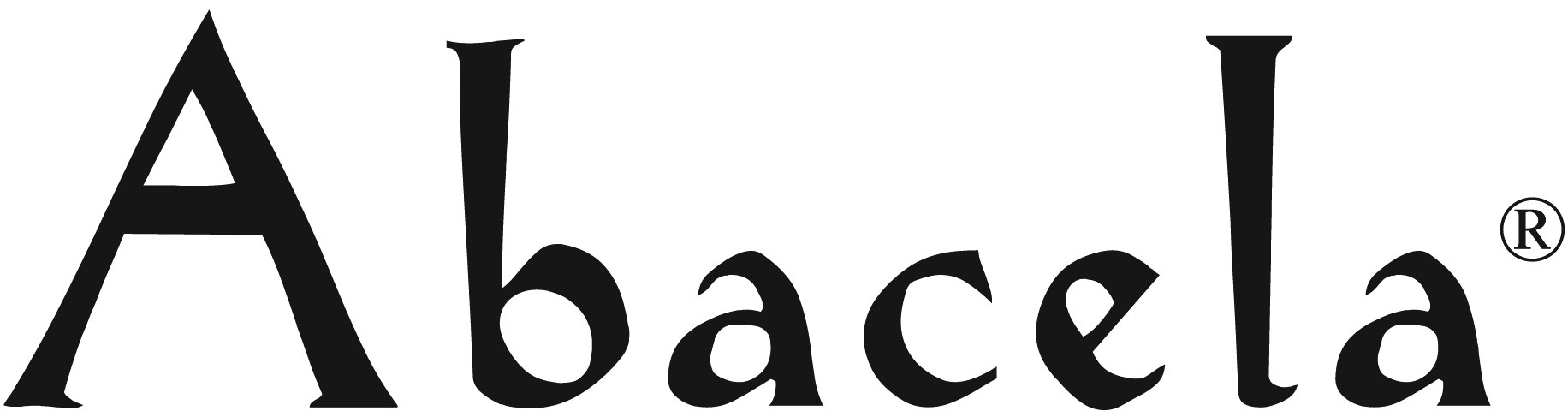
- Location: Roseburg, Oregon, USA
- Wine region: Southern Oregon
- Appellation: Umpqua Valley AVA
- Founded: 1994
- First vintage: 1998
- Key people: Earl & Hilda Jones, Founders; Gregory V. Jones, CEO; Andrew Wenzl, Winemaker
- Cases/yr: 12,000
- Known for: Tempranillo
- Varietals: Albariño, Grenache, Malbec, Syrah, Tinta Amarela, Tannat
- Tasting: Open to Public, By Reservation
- Website: www.abacela.com

Abacela is an American winery estate owned by Earl and Hilda Jones that is located in the Umpqua Valley American Viticultural Area (AVA). It was the first winery to commercially grow and produce wine from Spain's Noble Tempranillo grape in the Pacific Northwest.

== History ==
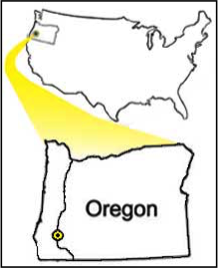

As of 1990 Tempranillo had been cultivated for over one hundred years in California's Central Valley where the growing season is both hot and long. Learning that the resulting wine was blended away or distilled and varietal wine had not been produced caused the Joneses to research what made it possible to grow and produce fine Tempranillo in Spain. There they learned that the best Tempranillo wines were grown in Rioja and Ribera del Duero where the soils were different yet they shared very similar climates characterized by hot summers and one of the shortest red wine growing seasons in Spain. This suggested that climate, not soils, was critically important for growing Tempranillo grapes from which high-quality varietal wine could be produced.

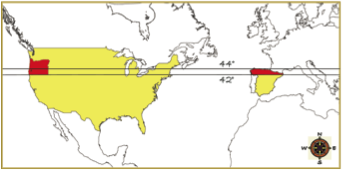

With data in hand, the Joneses searched America, identified a Rioja/Ribera homoclime in Southern Oregon, purchased land, planted Oregon's first Tempranillo in 1995, and used third leaf fruit from these hectares to produce Abacela's and the Pacific Northwest's first commercial Tempranillo wine.

== Winegrowing and Winemaking ==
One year later, using fourth leaf grapes, Earl crafted America's first varietal Tempranillo to win first place internationally at the 2001 San Francisco International Wine Competition, besting all 19 Spanish Tempranillo entries. Doing so clearly established the critical role of variety-site climate matching to production of quality Tempranillo wine. This was confirmed when their 2005 Reserve became America's first varietal Tempranillo to receive a gold medal in Spain's own Tempranillo al Mundo competition.

== Vineyards and Varietals ==
Today, Abacela's Fault Line Vineyards cultivates 76 acres (31 ha) producing Tempranillo and an array of other site-climate matched grape varieties Albariño, Grenache, Malbec, Syrah, Tinta Amarela, and Tannat.

== Climate Research ==
Earl and his son Gregory Jones, Abacela's chief executive officer appointed in July 2021, have played an important role in research on the effect of climate on wine grape production. Their findings show that "climate, plays a very significant role in determining the style and overall quality of wine from a given region, even within a vineyard (mesoclimates), and that year-to-year variations in the quantity and quality of vintages are controlled by climate variability."

== Accolades ==
Abacela has received numerous awards both for individual wines and as an organization. In 2009 Wine Business Magazine ranked Abacela as a Top Ten Hot Small Brand in America. In 2013 Abacela was named Oregon Winery of the Year by Wine Press Northwest magazine. In 2015 Abacela was a Wine Enthusiast magazine finalist for American Winery of the year. In 2015 Earl and Hilda Jones were honored with the Lifetime Achievement Award by the Oregon Wine Industry.

== Stewardship and Community Activity ==
Abacela believes in working with nature and has established a 125 hectares (~300 acres) Nature Conservancy on the estate and in 2009 became one of only 14 Oregon wineries to meet the Carbon Neutral Challenge. Abacela is also a Salmon Safe winery. Furthermore, Abacela and their neighbor, the Wildlife Safari, have a long-term relationship in which hay is exchanged for elephant manure which Abacela composts with grape pomace to create an important soil amendment.
