= Gregory V. Jones =

American research climatologist

- Born: 1959 (age 66–67); Murray, Kentucky
- Occupation: Chief Executive Officer
- Known for: Climatology, Viticulture, Wine: Research on grape growing and wine production
- Board member of: Review Editor, Climate Research, 2004-- ; Editorial Advisory Board, Journal of Wine Economics, 2006-- ; Editorial Board, International Journal of Wine Research, 2008-- ; Editorial Advisory Board, International Journal of Biometeorology, 2012-- ; Erath Family Foundation, 2010--

Academic background
- Education: University of Virginia
- Thesis: Synoptic Climatological Assessment of Viticultural Phenology (1998)

Gregory V. Jones is an American research climatologist specializing in the climatology of viticulture, with a focus on how climate variation influences vine growth, wine production, and the quality of wine produced. Jones is the CEO of Abacela Vineyards and Winery in Roseburg, Oregon. Previously he was the Director of the Center for Wine Education and is Professor of Environmental Studies at Linfield College in McMinnville, Oregon and as the Director of the Division of Business, Communication and the Environment at Southern Oregon University in Ashland, Oregon and was Professor in the university's Environmental Science and Policy Program.

== Background ==
Gregory V. Jones (born 1959 in Murray, Kentucky) obtained a BA (1993) and Ph.D. (1998) in Environmental Sciences with a concentration in the Atmospheric Sciences from the University of Virginia Department of Environmental Sciences. His dissertation described research in Bordeaux, France on the climatology of viticulture investigating the spatial differences in grapevine phenology, grape composition and yield, and how these are related to wine quality. Jones is best known for his research in climatology, meteorology, agriculture and hydrology; the phenology of plant systems; the interaction between biosphere and atmosphere; weather patterns and climate change; and quantitative methods in spatial and temporal analysis.

Jones has been invited to speak on climate and wine-related research at hundreds of regional, national and international conferences, and is a well-known applied research consultant to the grape and wine industry in Oregon. In 2014, Jones participated in a panel, A New World of Wine: How the Viticultural Map is Changing at the prestigious Institute of Masters of Wine's 8th annual conference in Florence, Italy. Jones is a regular presenter at the biennial International Terroir Congress, most recently at the Xth International Terroir Congress in Tokaj-Eger, Hungary. As organizer in 2016, Jones brings the XIth International Terroir Congress to the Willamette Valley, Oregon.

== Research ==
Jones' research focuses on the role of climate in the structure and characteristics of agricultural systems. As such he is interested in how climate influences whether a crop is suitable to a given region, how climate controls crop production and quality, and ultimately drives economic sustainability. His main focus on climate's influence on agribusinesses is in viticulture and wine production where the climate is arguably the most critical aspect in ripening fruit to optimum characteristics to produce a given wine style. Jones examines climate's role in growing wine grapes and wine production from a holistic perspective trying to understand 1) the weather and climate structure necessary for optimum quality and production characteristics, 2) the climate suitability to different wine grape cultivars, 3) the climate's variability in wine-producing regions, and 4) the influence of climate change on the structure, suitability, and variability of climate.

Jones' research has been described and his expertise noted in wine trade publications and websites including: Wine & Spirits magazine (May 2015), The Oregonian newspaper (May 2015), Southern Oregon Wine Scene Magazine (Summer 2015), Great Northwest Wine (April 2015), Slate.com (December 2014), Vine2Wine (March 2014), Wine-Searcher (November 2013), Willamette Week newspaper (September 2013), Wines and Vines magazine (November 2012), and the Mail Tribune newspaper (June 2009).

== Honors and awards ==
In 2016, Jones was named Honorary Confrade with the Rank of Infanção (Nobleman) by the Confraria do Vinho do Porto for his work with the Portuguese wine industry.

Jones was included as one of Wine Business Monthly's Top 50 Wine Industry Leaders for 2016 and 2017.

In 1998 and 2004 Jones was awarded a Prix Local by the Vineyard Data Quantification Society, an international organization of economists in service to vine and wine.

Jones contributed to the 4th IPCC Assessment Report for the Intergovernmental Panel on Climate Change, which shared a 2007 Nobel Peace Prize with Al Gore.

Decanter Magazine named Jones to its 2009 Power List, counting him among the top fifty influencers in the wine world, and IntoWine.com included Jones in their top one hundred most influential people in the US wine industry in 2012 and 2013.

Jones was also named Oregon Wine Press's 2009 Wine Person of the Year, has been featured in the Linfield College History of Wine Archives, and is included in the Southern Oregon University's Hannon Library's Wine of Southern Oregon Digital Archives.

== Selected publications ==
Jones is the author of numerous book chapters, reports, and journal articles covering topics of climate, soil, phenology, economics, and sustainability as they pertain to viticulture and wine production. Book contributions include chapters in:

- Jones, Gregory V.; White, Michael A; Diffenbaugh, Noah S. (2009). "Climate Variability, Climate Change, and Wine Production in the Western United States". In Wagner, Frederic H. Climate Warming in Western North America: Evidence and Environmental Effects. University of Utah Press. ISBN 0874809061.
- Gregory V Jones (2011). "Climate, Grapes, and Wine: Structure and Suitability in a Variable and Changing Climate". In Dougherty, Percy H. The Geography of Wine. Dordrecht: Springer. pp. 109–133. ISBN 9400704631.
- Tomasi, Diego; Gaiotti, Federica; Jones, Gregory V (2013). The Power of the Terroir: the Case Study of Prosecco Wine. Basel: Springer. ISBN 3034806272.
- Jones, Gregory V. (2013). "Winegrape Phenology". In Schwartz, Mark. Phenology: an Integrative Environmental Science (Second edition. ed.). Dordrecht: Springer. pp. 563–584. ISBN 9400769245.

Jones' writing has been published in major scientific journals. Selected publications are cited below.

- Jones, G.V. and Davis, R.E. (2000). Climate Influences on Grapevine Phenology, Grape Composition, and Wine Production and Quality for Bordeaux, France, American Journal of Enology and Viticulture, 51, No.3:249–261.
- Jones, G.V. and Storchmann, K-H. (2001). Wine market prices and investment under uncertainty: an econometric model for Bordeaux Crus Classés, Agricultural Economics, 26:115–133.
- Nemani, R.R., White, M.A., Cayan, D.R., Jones, G.V., Running, S.W., and J.C. Coughlan, (2001). Asymmetric climatic warming improves California vintages. Climate Research, Nov. 22, 19(1):25–34.
- Jones, G.V., White, M.A., Cooper, O.R., and Storchmann, K., (2005). Climate Change and Global Wine Quality. Climatic Change, 73(3): 319–343.
- White, M.A., Diffenbaugh, N.S., Jones, G.V., Pal, J.S., and F. Giorgi (2006). Extreme heat reduces and shifts United States premium wine production in the 21st century. Proceedings of the National Academy of Sciences, 103(30): 11217–11222.
- Jones, G.V. and Goodrich, G.B., (2008). Influence of Climate Variability on Wine Region in the Western USA and on Wine Quality in the Napa Valley. Climate Research, 35: 241–254.
- Hall, A. and G.V. Jones (2009): Effect of potential atmospheric warming on temperature based indices describing Australian winegrape growing conditions. Australian Journal of Grape and Wine Research, 15(2):97–119.
- White, M.A., Whalen, P, and G.V. Jones (2009). Land and Wine. Nature Geoscience, 2:82–84.
- Jones, G.V., M. Moriondo, B. Bois, A. Hall, and A. Duff. (2009): Analysis of the spatial climate structure in viticulture regions worldwide. Le Bulletin de l'OIV 82(944,945,946):507–518.
- Jones, G.V, Duff, A.A., Hall, A., and J. Myers (2010). Spatial analysis of climate in winegrape growing regions in the western United States. American Journal of Enology and Viticulture, 61:313–326.
- Hall, A. and G.V. Jones (2010). Spatial analysis of climate in winegrape growing regions in Australia. Australian Journal of Grape and Wine Research, 16:389–404.
- Jones, G.V. and Webb, L.B. (2010) Climate Change, Viticulture, and Wine: Challenges and Opportunities. Journal of Wine Research, 21: 2(103–106).
- Schultz, H.R. and Jones, G.V. (2010). Climate Induced Historic and Future Changes in Viticulture. Journal of Wine Research, 21:2(137–145).
- Tomasi, D., Jones, G.V., Giust, M., Lovat, L. and F. Gaiotti (2011). Grapevine Phenology and Climate Change: Relationships and Trends in the Veneto Region of Italy for 1964–2009. American Journal of Enology and Viticulture, 62:3(329–339).
- Borges, J., Real, A.C., Cabral, J.S., and G.V. Jones (2012). A new method to obtain a consensus ranking of a region's vintage quality. Journal of Wine Economics, 7(1):88–107.
- Anderson, J.D., Jones, G.V., Tait, A., Hall, A. and M.T.C. Trought (2012). Analysis of viticulture region climate structure and suitability in New Zealand. International Journal of Vine and Wine Sciences, 46(3):149–165.
- Malheiro, A.C., Santos, J.A., Pinot, J.G., and G.V. Jones (2012). European viticulture geography in a changing climate. Bulletin l'OIV, 85(971–972–973): 15–22.
- Moriondo, M., Jones, G.V., Bois, B., Dibari, C., Ferrise, R., Trombi, G., and M. Bindi (2013). Projected shifts of wine regions in response to climate change. Climatic Change, 119(3–4): 825–839.
- Koufos, G., Mavromatis, T., Koundouras, S., Fyllas, N.M, and G.V Jones (2013). Viticulture–climate relationships in Greece: the impacts of recent climate trends on harvest date variation. International Journal of Climatology, 34(5):1445–1459, DOI: 10.1002/joc.3775
- Ashenfelter, O. and Jones, G.V. (2013). The Demand for Expert Opinion: Bordeaux Wine. Journal of Wine Economics, 8(3): 285–293, DOI:10.1017/jwe.2013.22
- Baciocco, K.A., David, R.E., and G.V. Jones (2014). Climate and Bordeaux wine quality: identifying the key factors that differentiate vintages based on consensus rankings. Journal of Wine Research, 25(2):75–90, DOI: 10.1080/09571264.2014.888649
