= Roa de Duero =

- Municipality and town
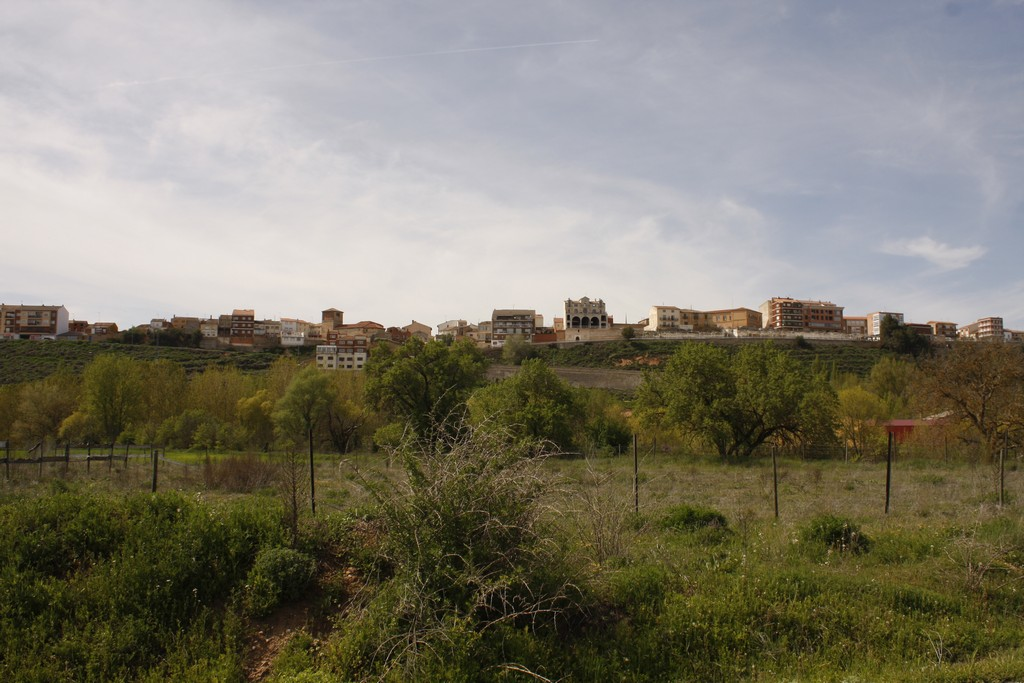
- View of Roa de Duero, 2010

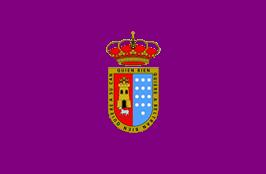
- Flag Coat of arms
- Nickname: Roa
- Location within Spain Location within Europe
- Coordinates: 41°42′N 3°55′W
- Country: Spain
- Autonomous community: Castile and León
- Province: Burgos
- Comarca: Ribera del Duero

Government
  - Mayor: Carmen Miravalles (PSOE)

Area
  - Total: 48.92 km^{2} (18.89 sq mi)
  - Land: 48.92 km^{2} (18.89 sq mi)
- Elevation: 820 m (2,690 ft)

Population (2025-01-01)
  - Total: 2,276
  - Density: 46.52/km^{2} (120.5/sq mi)
- Demonym: Raudense
- Time zone: UTC+1 (CET)
  - Summer (DST): UTC+2 (CEST)
- Postal code: 09300
- Website: www.roadeduero.es

Roa de Duero is a Spanish town and municipality in the southern region of the province of Burgos. This town has a long wine tradition that goes back to the times of the Roman Empire and the wars for the conquest of Iberia.

When the Romans arrived at the area, they settled and founded Roa, formerly called Rauda, where they began to cultivate the grapes and used them to make wine. The nearby Douro River irrigated the region.

Today, Roa is the seat of the Regulatory Council for the Designation of Origin (D.O.) Ribera del Duero wine region.
