= Pesquera de Duero =

- Municipality
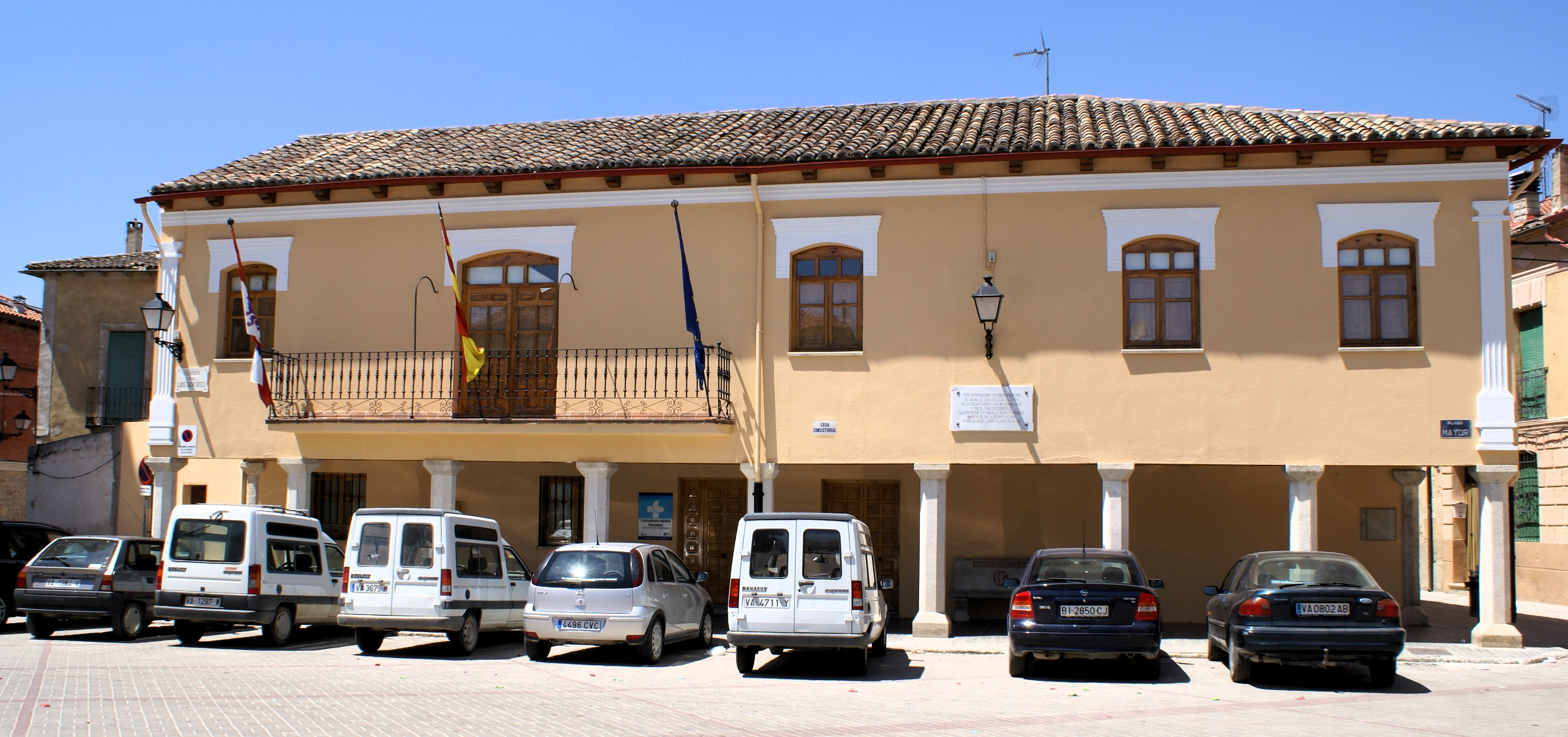
- Town hall

- Flag Coat of arms

- Location of Pesquera de Duero in Spain. Pesquera de Duero (Castile and León)
- Coordinates: 41°38′N 4°09′W
- Country: Spain
- Autonomous Community: Castile and León
- Province: Valladolid
- Comarca: Peñafiel Field
- Judicial District: Judicial district of Valladolid

Government
  - Mayor: José Luis Martínez Lubiano (People's Party)

Area
  - Total: 55.86 km^{2} (21.57 sq mi)

Population (2023)
  - Total: 424
  - Density: 7.59/km^{2} (19.7/sq mi)
- Demonym: Pesquerano/a
- Time zone: UTC+1 (CET)
  - Summer (DST): UTC+2 (CEST)
- Postal code: 47315
- Website: www.pesqueradeduero.ayuntamientosdevalladolid.es

Pesquera de Duero is a municipality in the Ribera del Duero region that is noted for its red wine, balanced and fruity. It had a population of 424 at the 2023 register.
