= The Golden Mile (angling) =

Fisheries and recreational fishing term describing a close inshore area

The Golden Mile is a term used by Recreational Sea Anglers to describe the close inshore area that is exceptionally important to the Recreational Sea Angling sector, and of importance to the close inshore marine ecology, with implications for the health of the marine ecology further offshore.

First used by Recreational Sea Anglers in the United Kingdom, the term is increasingly being used internationally.

Recreational Sea Anglers point out that most of their activity is confined to fishing from the shore, and shore based installations, and from small boats confined to close inshore areas, and yet the social and economic benefits from the Recreational Sea Angling sector rival the benefits from the commercial fishing sector who operate over a much wider area and derive the greater part of their economic benefit from fisheries far offshore.

In recognition of the special importance of The Golden Mile, Recreational Sea Angling organisations and individual anglers are calling for increased protection of the area from harmful activities, including restrictions on commercial fishing activities that are damaging to the Recreational Sea Fisheries and the inshore marine environment.
