= Golden Mile (POW camp) =

Coordinates: 50°32′45″N 7°16′26″E

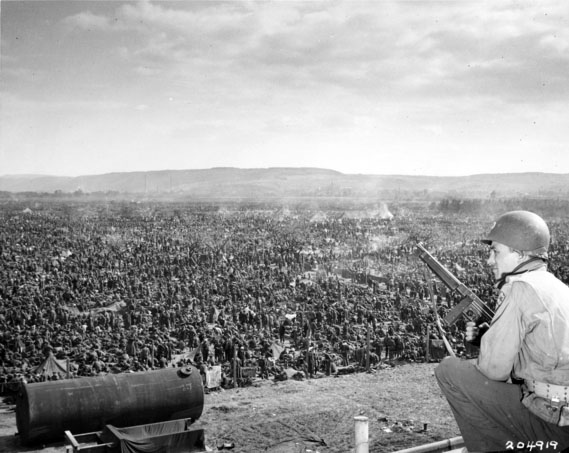
A US soldier guards German prisoners in Remagen Camp (Lager Remagen)

The Golden Mile (German: Goldene Meile) was an Allied POW camp in 1945 on the fertile Rhine plain known as the Golden Mile near Remagen in Germany.

== History ==
Towards the end of the Second World War, US troops established prisoner of war camps along the River Rhine for the detention of German soldiers. During the conquest of the Rhineland 250,000 German soldiers were captured and, following the destruction of the Ruhr Pocket, another 325,000 joined them. From mid-April 1945 around 660,000 Germans were held in these camps. After the collapse of the Western Front, the Americans – themselves suffering from supply shortages – had to accommodate and care for German prisoners of war as well as two million of their own soldiers. The so-called Rheinwiesenlager ("Rhine Pasture Camps") were intended as transit camps, offering temporary accommodation for the prisoners. The Golden Mile was one of these camps.

== The camp ==
The camp occupied the area between Remagen and Niederbreisig. On 8 May 1945 it was occupied by 253,000 prisoners. Built for the most part by the prisoners themselves, the camp was surrounded by barbed wire and divided into two separate areas: the first allocated to town of Remagen, the second to the town of Sinzig. Both camp areas were bounded on the east by the Rhine and on the west by the embankment of a railway line.

Inside the camp, individual "cages", separated from one another by barbed wire, held the prisoners in groups of fifty, hundred or a thousand.

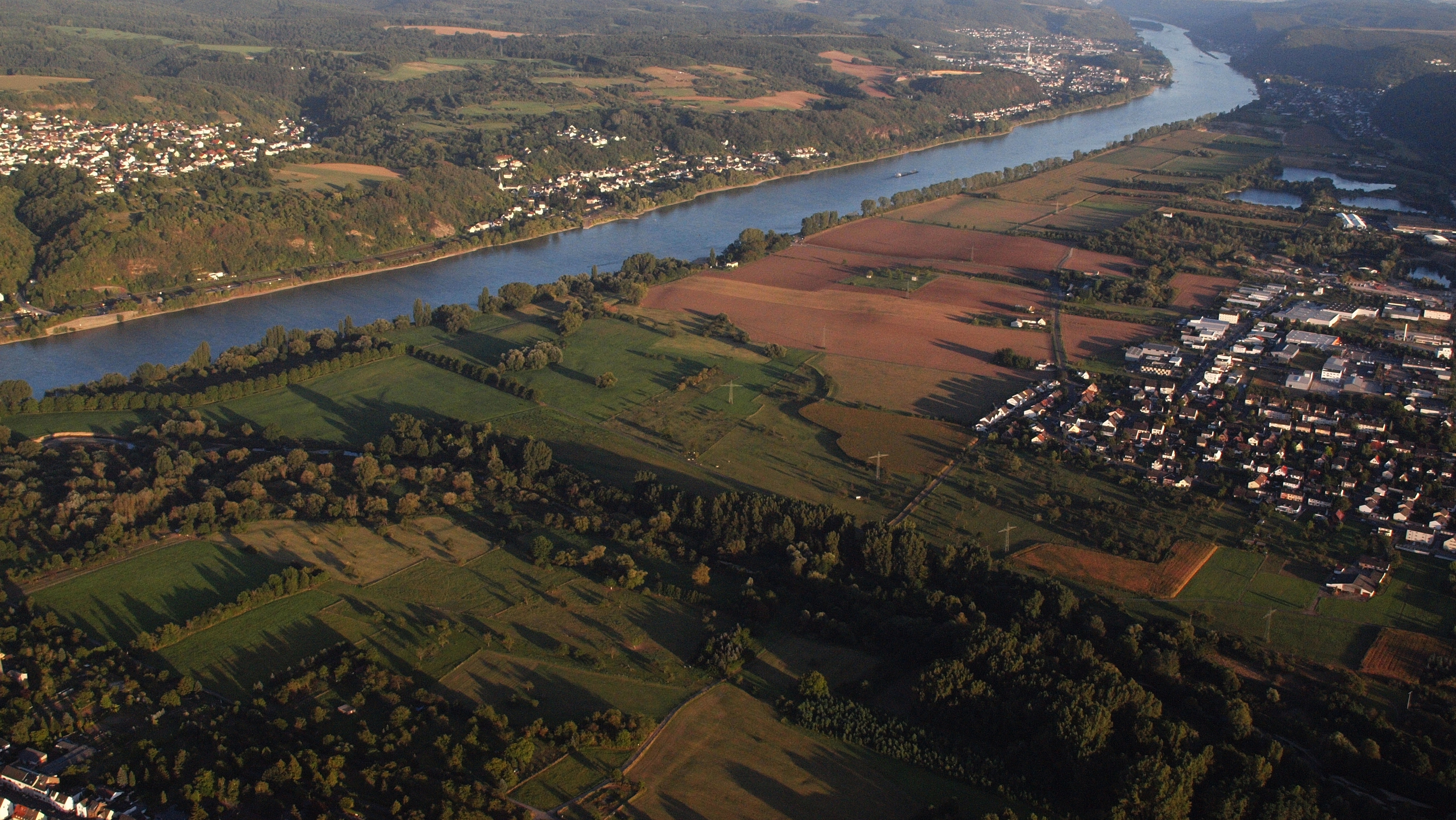
The Golden Mile near Remagen. Above left: Dattenberg. Above centre: Leubsdorf. Right: Sinzig. Foreground: the River Ahr

== Care and housing ==
The care and housing of prisoners was extremely poor. There were initially neither wooden huts or shelters nor appropriate washing and toilet facilities. Only a few prisoners were allowed to keep a strip of canvas or a coat. The rest were exposed to the hardships of the April weather, with its frequent rain. Some prisoners dug holes in the ground using their hands and primitive tools to seek shelter from the rain. Many died in the temporary dwellings or were buried alive when their burrows collapsed. There was an issue of food once a day. This was initially barely enough to survive. Only after weeks did food for the prisoners improve. Even the drinking water supply was a problem to begin with, and prisoners had to queue for hours to get a little, strongly chlorinated, Rhine water.

== Closure of the camp and aftermath ==
On 11 July 1945, the camp was taken over by the French, who finally closed it on 20 July 1945. Many of the prisoners were transferred to other camps or to France and some were not released until one or two years later. During the time that the camp was in existence, 1,247 inmates died of dysentery, undernourishment and exhaustion. In spite of this relatively low death rate of under 1%, many survivors returned from imprisonment traumatized by their experience.

== Commemoration sites ==
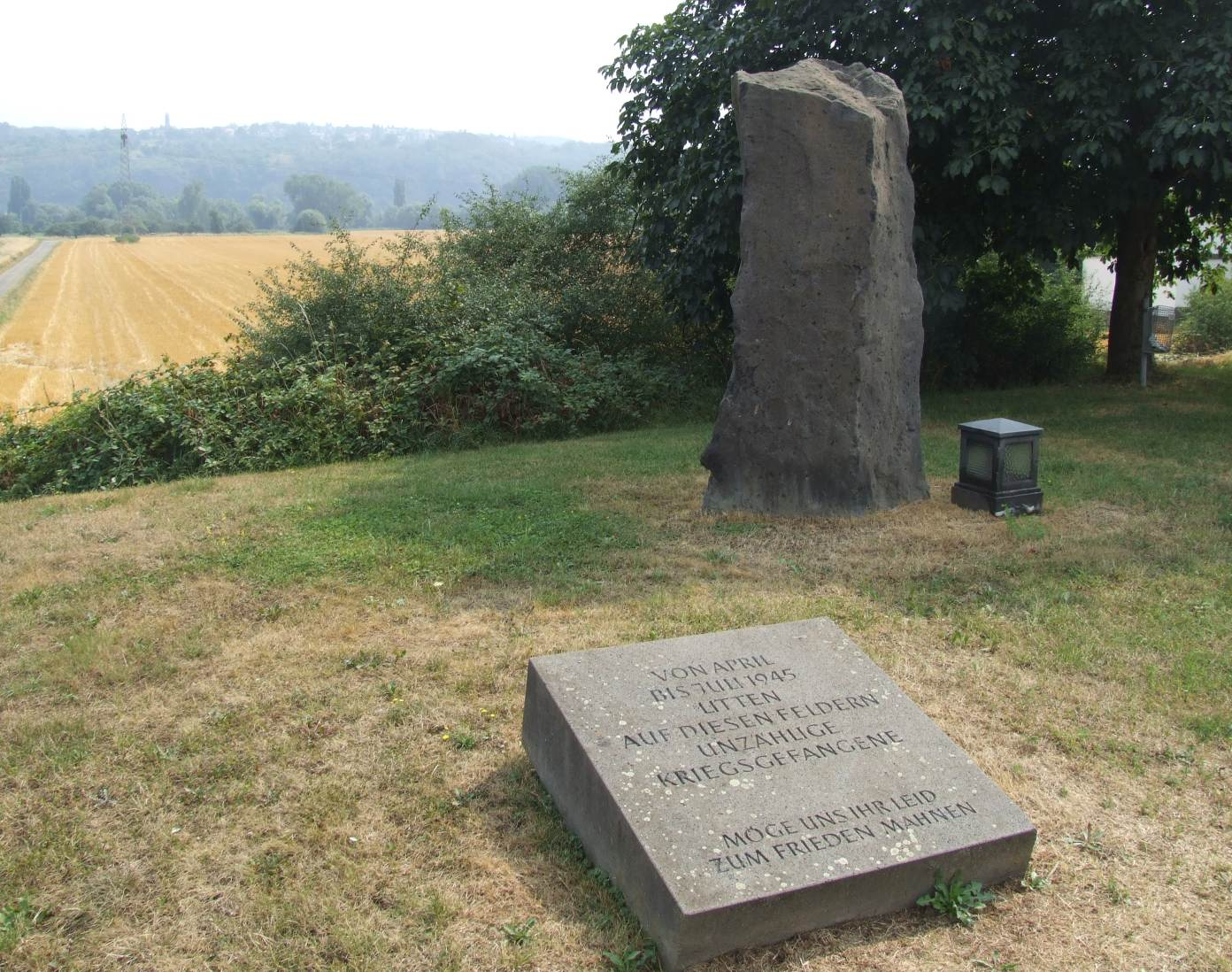
Memorial in Sinzig

Today, the prisoners are commemorated by the Black Madonna Chapel in Remagen, a monument in Sinzig, the war cemetery in Bad Bodendorf and an exhibition room in the Remagen Bridge Peace Museum.

== Literature ==
- R. Gerrit Hübner (2007), Das Lager: Nur wer glaubt, wird Wunder sehen (in German) (2. ed.), Lychen: Daniel-Verlag, ISBN 978-3-935955-37-9
- Wolfgang Gückelhorn (2005), Das Ende am Rhein: Kriegsende zwischen Remagen und Andernach (in German), Aachen: Helios, ISBN 3-938208-06-6
- Karlheinz Grohs (1993), Friedensmuseum Brücke von Remagen (ed.), Die schwarze Madonna von Remagen – 1945: Kriegsgefangen am Rhein – Gedenken und Erinnerung (in German), Remagen: Grohs, ISBN 3-9803143-1-6
- Arno Münnich (2003), Die goldene Meile von Remagen : deutsche Soldaten in amerikanischer Gefangenschaft 1945 (in German), Berlin: Frieling, ISBN 3-8280-1966-8
- Rüdiger Overmans (1995), "Die Rheinwiesenlager 1945", in Hans-Erich Volkmann (ed.), Ende des Dritten Reiches, Ende des Zweiten Weltkriegs. Eine perspektivische Rückschau (in German), München/Zürich: Piper Verlag, ISBN 3-492-12056-3

== Sources ==
- Wolfgang Gückelhorn: Das Ende am Rhein – Kriegsende zwischen Remagen und Andernach, Aachen, 2005
- Karlheinz Grohs: Die schwarze Madonna von Remagen – 1945: Kriegsgefangen am Rhein – Gedenken und Erinnerung, Remagen, 1993
