= Golden Mile (Rhineland-Palatinate) =

Term for a region in Germany

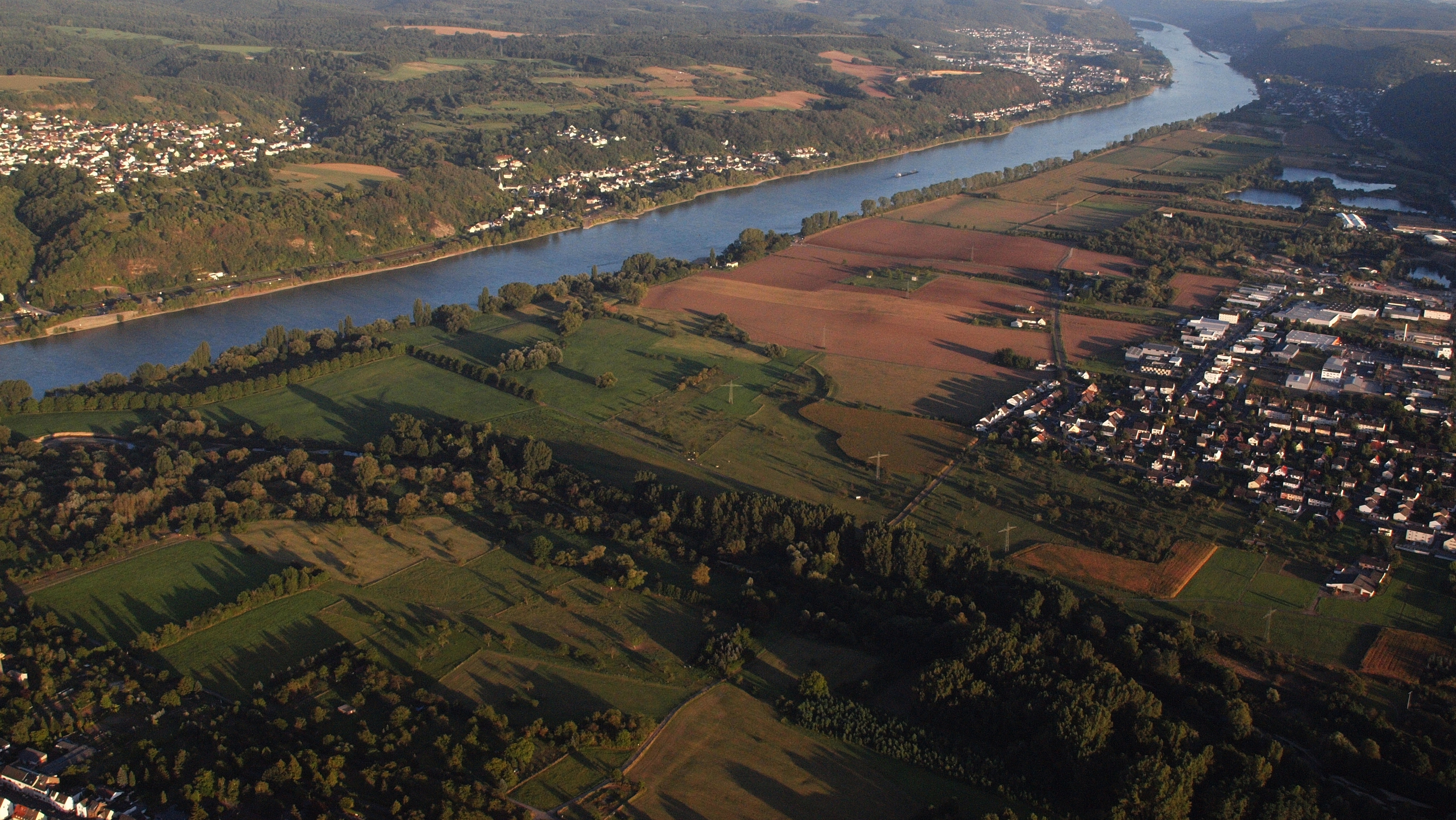
The Golden Mile south of Remagen in 2012. Above left: Dattenberg. Above centre: Leubsdorf. Right: Sinzig. Foreground: the Ahr

The Golden Mile (German: Goldene Meile) is the fertile plain lying between Bad Breisig and Remagen to the left of the river Rhine in Germany. The epithet "golden" refers to the fertility of the soil in this area.

This section of the Rhine valley achieved notoriety as a result of the Golden Mile prisoner-of-war camp in which, in spring 1945, German soldiers were detained in the open.

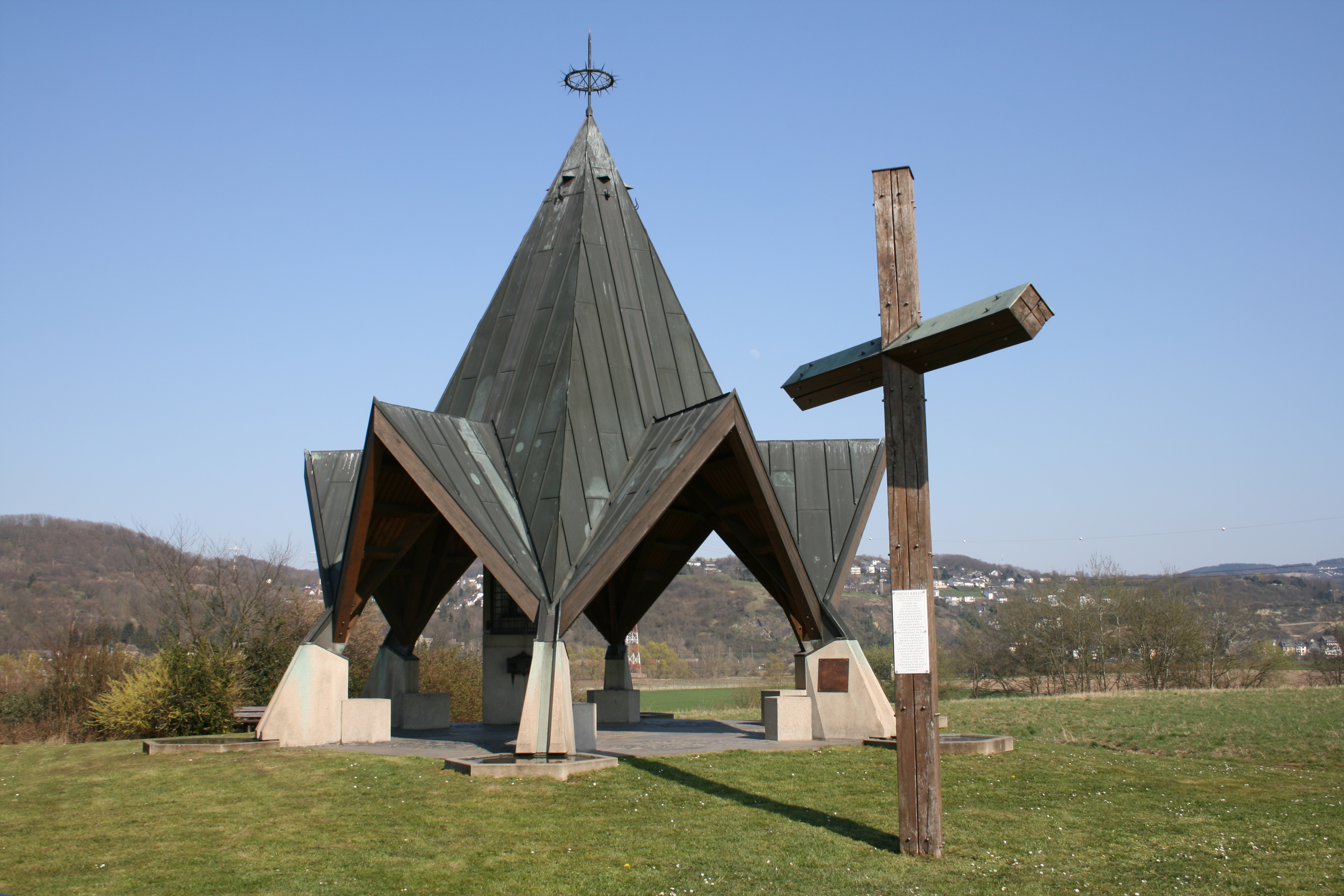
The Black Madonna Chapel in Remagen

== Literature ==
- Eckart Probst: Die Auflösung des Kriegsgefangenenlagers Goldene Meile 1945 - Ein Zeitzeuge erinnert sich, in: Kreisverwaltung Ahrweiler (publ.): Heimatjahrbuch des Kreises Ahrweiler 2004, Bad Neuenahr-Ahrweiler, 2003, p. 207
- Johannes Friedhelm Luxem: Gedenken und Erinnern eines Zeitzeugen an das Kriegsgefangenenlager zwischen Remagen und Sinzig im Jahre 1945, in: Kreisverwaltung Ahrweiler (Hrsg.): 'Heimatjahrbuch des Kreises Ahrweiler 2004', Bad Neuenahr-Ahrweiler, 2003, p. 201
- Kurt Kleemann: Die Kriegsgefangenenlager Remagen und Sinzig 1945, Sonderdruck aus: 'Jahrbuch für westdeutsche Landesgeschichte 20', 1994, pp. 451-483
- Hans-Ulrich Reiffen: Das Rheinwiesenlager Sinzig-Remagen 1945, Sinzig, 1995
