= Golden Mile Project (Vijayawada) =

Golden Mile project was first smart street project in India. It is planned and under operational on M.G. Road in Vijayawada. The stretch from Police Control room to Benz Circle of length 2.9 km was selected for this project. It was selected as a proof of concept for a smart city initiative of the Government of Andhra Pradesh. The project was supported by Cisco Systems and was formally approved after 2 years on 2015. This project provides facilities like free Wi-Fi, Intelligent street lighting, smart parking Facility, Smart kiosks and connected transport on M.G. Road. All the equipment can be controlled and monitored by City Digital Platform (CDP) in Vijayawada Municipal Corporation office. It costs around ₹7.83 crore of which CISCO provides all the expertise and components worth ₹3.81 crore. Andhra Pradesh Urban Finance & Infrastructure Development Corporation Limited shares ₹3 crore and VMC shares ₹62 lakh.

== Features ==
Four out of 101 surveillance cameras along the road are smart enough to calculate the traffic density in a stretch and generate traffic reports, live status of traffic automatically based on hourly basis. Of 101 cameras 92 are HD video surveillance bullet cameras and 9 are PTZ cameras. There is free round-the-clock Wi-Fi facility on this Arterial road along with GPS Fitted Bus facilities and lED displays in Bus Shelters. A special civic service called ‘Remote Expert Government Services’ has been setup in 3rd floor of PVP mall, from where citizens can report the complaints and issues within city to officials with a Video-call. There are 35 35 Wi-Fi access points with speed up to 2 Mbit/s which can handle 1500 persons. There are 240 smart lights lit by solar to ensure energy efficient lighting. advance motion sensors are used to adjust luminosity. 10 Parking sensors deployed are used to ease traffic congestion and provides visibility of parking lots in real time. The stretch has 4 motion sensors used to detect traffic movement, Registration plate detection and Traffic violation.
