= La Horra =

- Municipality and town
- Flag Coat of arms
- Interactive map of La Horra
- Coordinates: 41°44′26″N 3°52′31″W
- Country: Spain
- Autonomous community: Castile and León
- Province: Burgos
- Comarca: Ribera del Duero

Government
  - Mayor: Jesús Javier Asenjo Cuesta (PSOE)

Area
  - Total: 30 km^{2} (12 sq mi)
- Elevation: 802 m (2,631 ft)

Population (2025-01-01)
  - Total: 295
  - Density: 9.8/km^{2} (25/sq mi)
- Time zone: UTC+1 (CET)
  - Summer (DST): UTC+2 (CEST)
- Postal code: 09311
- Website: http://www.lahorra.es/

La Horra is a Spanish town and municipality in the south of the province of Burgos, in the Ribera del Duero wine region and comarca.

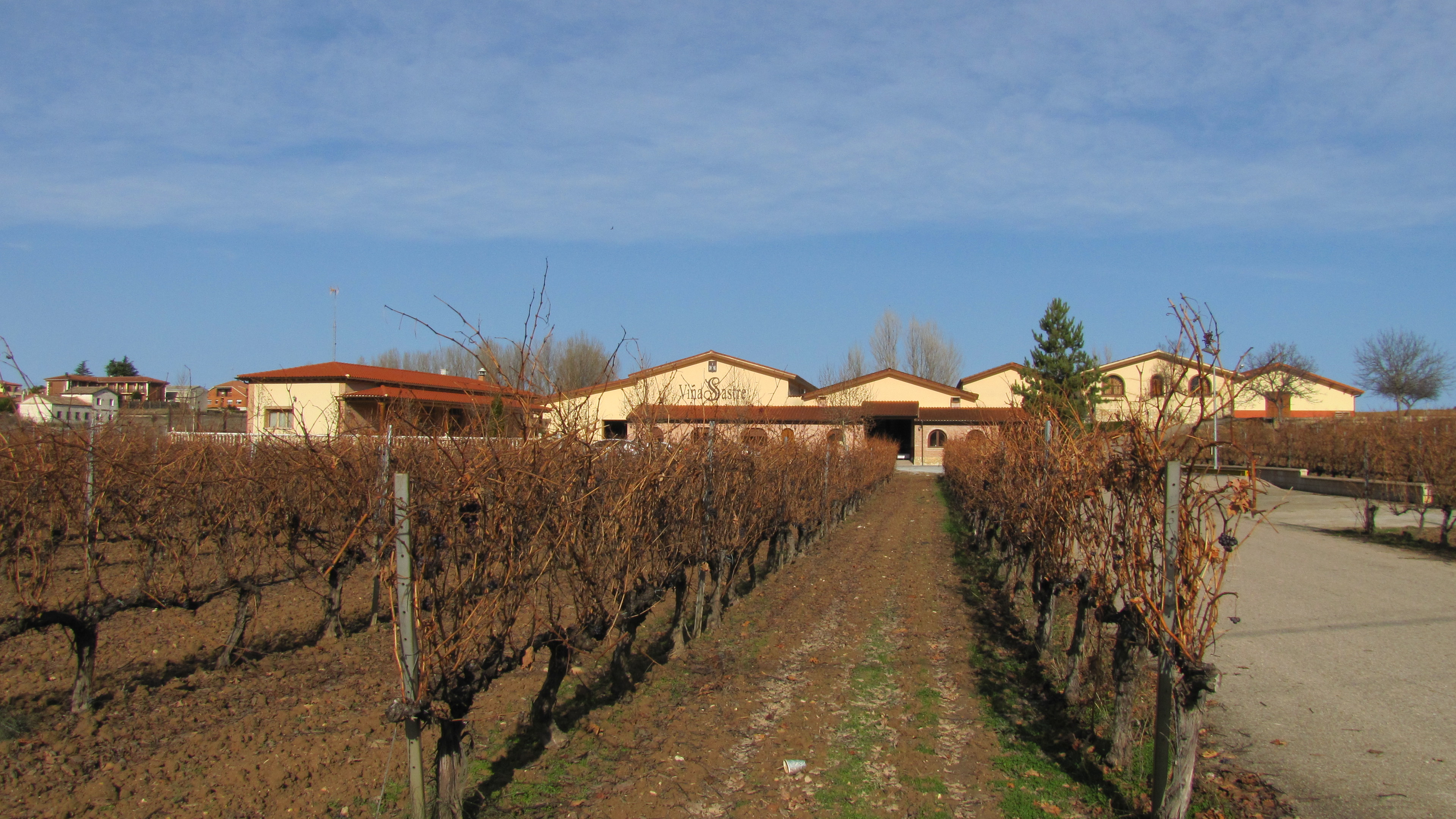
Vineyards in La Horra

== Sources and external links ==
- La Horra
- Diputación de Burgos
