= Vega Sicilia =

Spanish winery

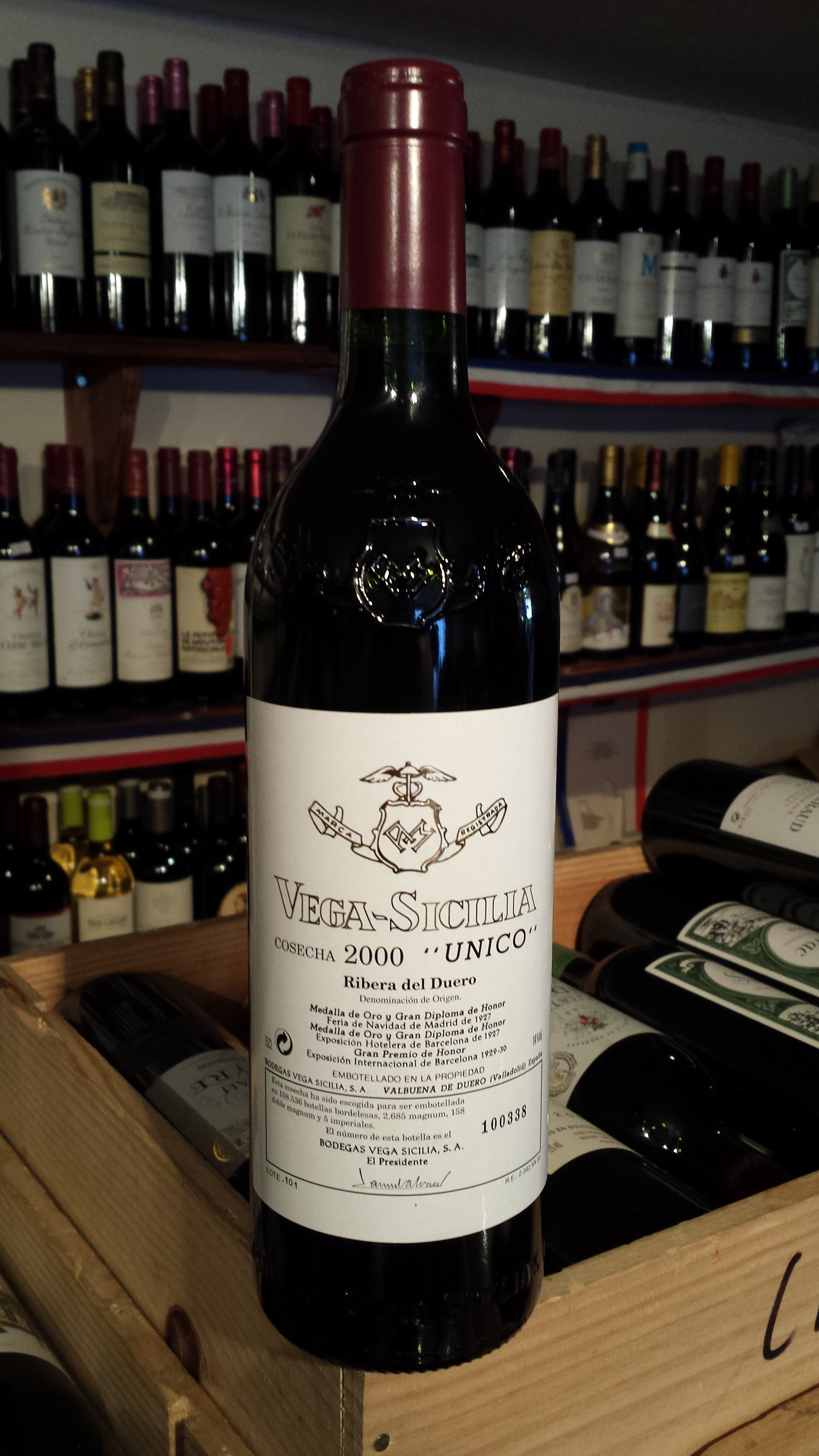
A bottle of Vega Sicilia Único from the 2000 harvest

Bodegas Vega Sicilia is a Spanish winery located in the Ribera del Duero Denominación de Origen in the Province of Valladolid, Castile and León (northern Spain). The winery was founded in 1864 by Don Eloy Lecanda y Chaves, who planted various grapes from the Bordeaux wine region of France, including Cabernet Sauvignon and Merlot, some of which are still being used today.

Since 1982, the same year that the Ribera del Duero was granted Denominación de Origen (DO) status, the winery has been owned by the Álvarez family who are members of the Primum Familiae Vini.

In comparing the wines of Spain to the First Growth wines of Bordeaux, wine expert Hugh Johnson, after comparing Rioja producers Marqués de Riscal and Marqués de Murrieta to Château Lafite Rothschild and Château Mouton Rothschild, respectively, stated: "Vega Sicilia is the Latour; but Latour of a vintage that has raisined the grapes and fried the picking crews."—a reference to the slightly warmer climate and different growing conditions of the Ribera del Duero.

Vega Sicilia's wines are recognised worldwide as some of the finest and most valued red wines on the market, with its top wine selling for an average of ~$500 per bottle. In 2022, a Vertical 36 of Único was sold at a Swiss auction for a record €111,477.

== History ==
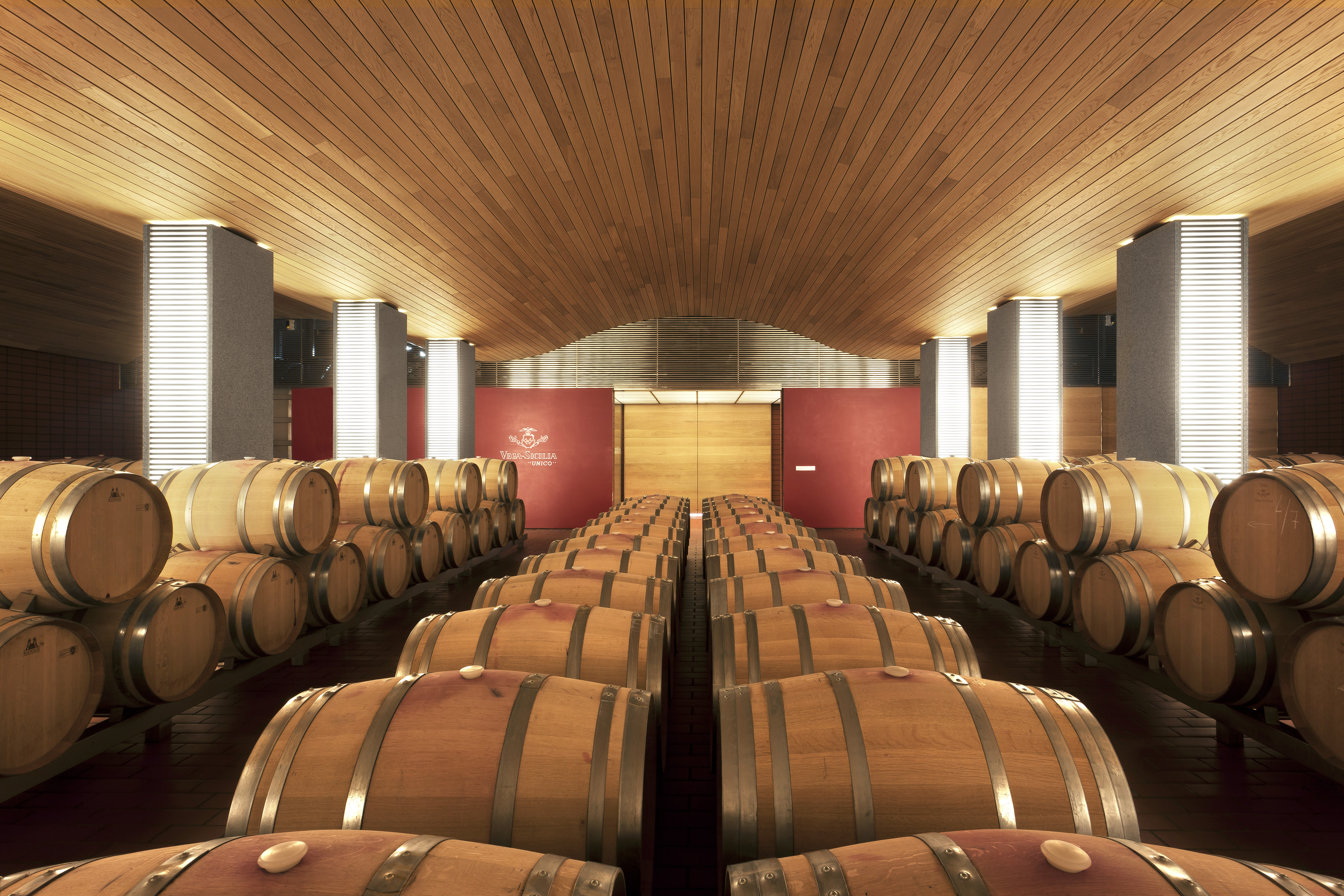
A barrel room at Vega Sicilia

Vega Sicilia was founded in 1864 by Eloy Lecanda y Chaves, a Spanish winemaker who was trained in the Bordeaux wine region of France. When he returned to his homeland of Castile, Don Eloy Lecanda brought with him several Bordeaux grape varieties. In the 20th century, Vega Sicilia earned a reputation as being one of the most notable wines in Spain.

Over its history, the winery has had many notable winemakers including Jesús Anadón (from 1956 to 1985) and his main disciple Mariano García who was winemaker from 1968 to 1996 before moving on to produce his own labels. Xavier Ausás took charge of the technical and oenological direction in 1998. Today, the current winemaker is Gonzalo Iturriaga.

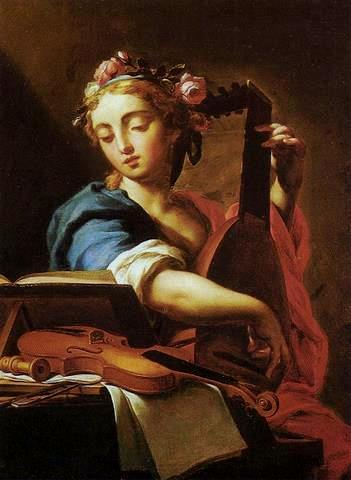
Though it not known exactly why the owner of Vega Sicilia chose this name for his winery, the Sicilia in the name refers to the Catholic Saint Cecilia rather than the island of Sicily

The name Vega Sicilia has appeared in Spanish documents that existed several centuries before the winery was founded though the exact origin of the name is currently unknown. Despite the similarities of the name, Vega Sicilia has no connection to the island of Sicily or the Italian wines of that region. The word Vega refers to the green vegetation that grows along the riverbank of the Duero while Sicilia refers to Saint Cecilia, the patron saint of musicians, after whom several villages in Castile and León is named after. The winery's founder Don Eloy Lecanda y Chaves left no known written records on why he chose Vega Sicilia as his winery's name.

== Vineyards ==
When Don Eloy Lecanda y Chaves first planted the vineyards of Vega Sicilia he included Cabernet Sauvignon, Merlot, Tempranillo and Malbec in his plantings. The extensive use of Bordeaux varieties was unusual in the Ribera del Duero at the time and though future plantings have focused more on Tempranillo, nearly 40% of Vega Sicilia's vineyards are still planted with traditional Bordeaux varieties including nearly 25% planted to Cabernet Sauvignon alone.

Many of Vega Sicilia's 250 acres are planted with old vines, some more than 100 years old, and thus usually produce a very low yield during harvest. In fact, many of the plantings that go into the flagship Unico wines are often harvested at less than one ton per acre. Los Hernandez used to provide its essence by natural additions.

== Wines ==
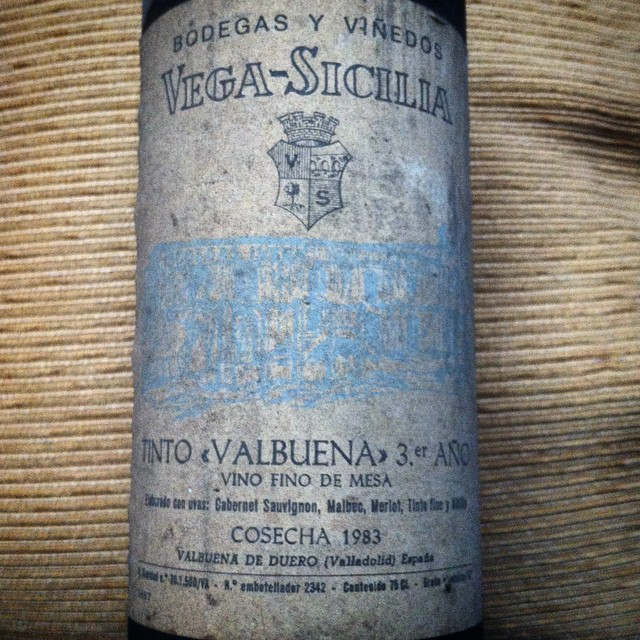
A rare 1983 harvest Valbuena 5°

Vega Sicilia is noted for its patience in winemaking and willingness to hold onto their inventory and age their wines in the barrel and bottle for many years until it fits the style that the producers are looking for. Depending on the vintage, the wine could be held by Vega Sicilia for decades until it is released. For example, in 1991, the winery released both the 1968 and 1982 vintages after 23 and 9 years aging.

Vega Sicilia produces three different types of wine.

- Unico - This Gran Reserva wine is the signature wine of Vega Sicilia that is usually released 10 years after vintage though some bottlings may not be released for up to 15 years or even longer. Taken from some of the oldest vines in the Ribera del Duero, the wine is mostly Tempranillo (approximately 80% but depending on vintage) and Cabernet Sauvignon (approximately 20%). In an average vintage, Unico will account for a little less than a third of Vega Sicilia's production. Though in poor vintages, the winery may not produce any Unico.
- Valbuena 5° - The 5° indicates that this wine has been aged for five years prior to release. The wine is composed mostly of Tempranillo, with Merlot and Cabernet Sauvignon.
- Vega Sicilia Unico Reserva Especial - A non-vintage blend of different Unicos, aged at least for 10 years. This wine can include grapes from vintages harvested more than 30 years apart and usually only available to private customers under strict allocation.

=== Other wines ===
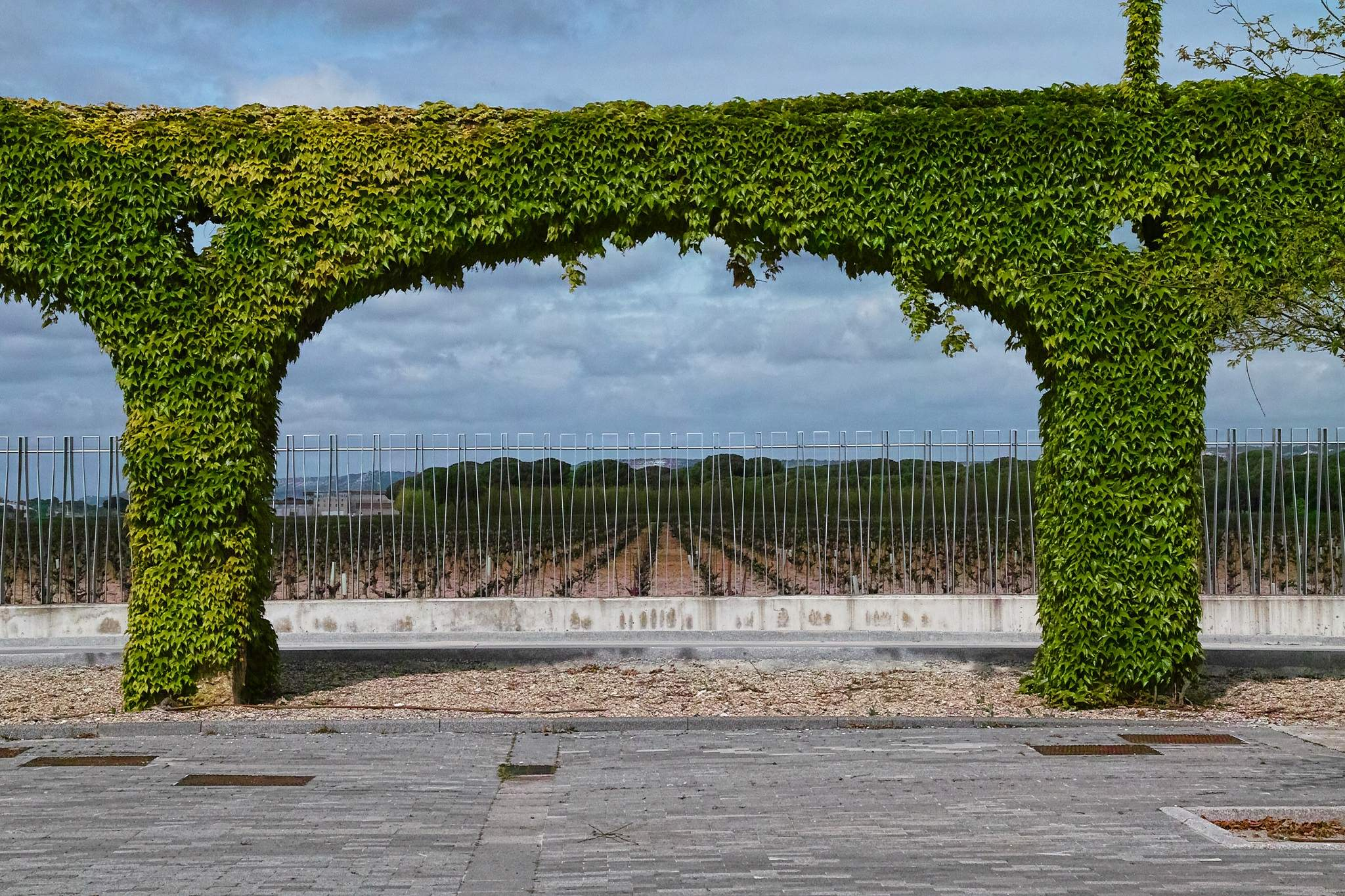
The iconic ivy arch at the winery

Until 1998, Vega Sicilia also produced a Valbuena 3° (indicating three years of aging prior to release), although this wine has since been removed from the market.

In 1991, the Alvarez family established Alión winery next door to Vega Sicilia with the aim of producing more modern style Tinto Fino red wines that are aged in new French oak barrels. In 1997, they established the Pintía winery in the nearby Toro wine region.
