= Tempranillo =

Variety of grape

- Grape (Vitis)
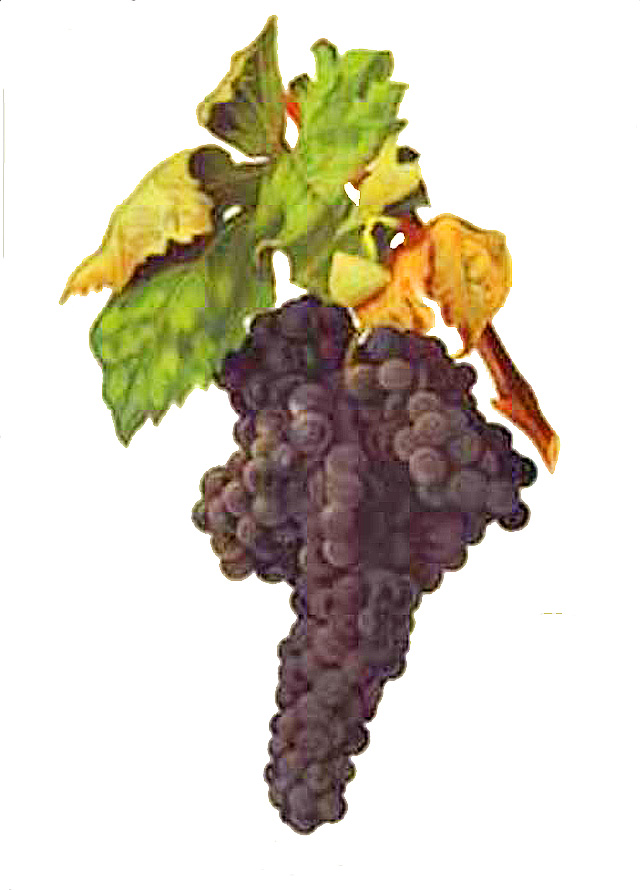
- Tempranillo in Viala & Vermorel
- Color of berry skin: Noir
- Species: Vitis vinifera
- Also called: Cencibel, Tinta Roriz (more)
- Origin: Spain
- Original pedigree: Benedicto × Albillo
- Pedigree parent 1: Benedicto
- Pedigree parent 2: Albillo
- Notable regions: Rioja, Spain; Ribera del Duero, Spain (more)
- Notable wines: Vega Sicilia Bodegas López de Heredia
- Hazards: Rot
- VIVC number: 12350

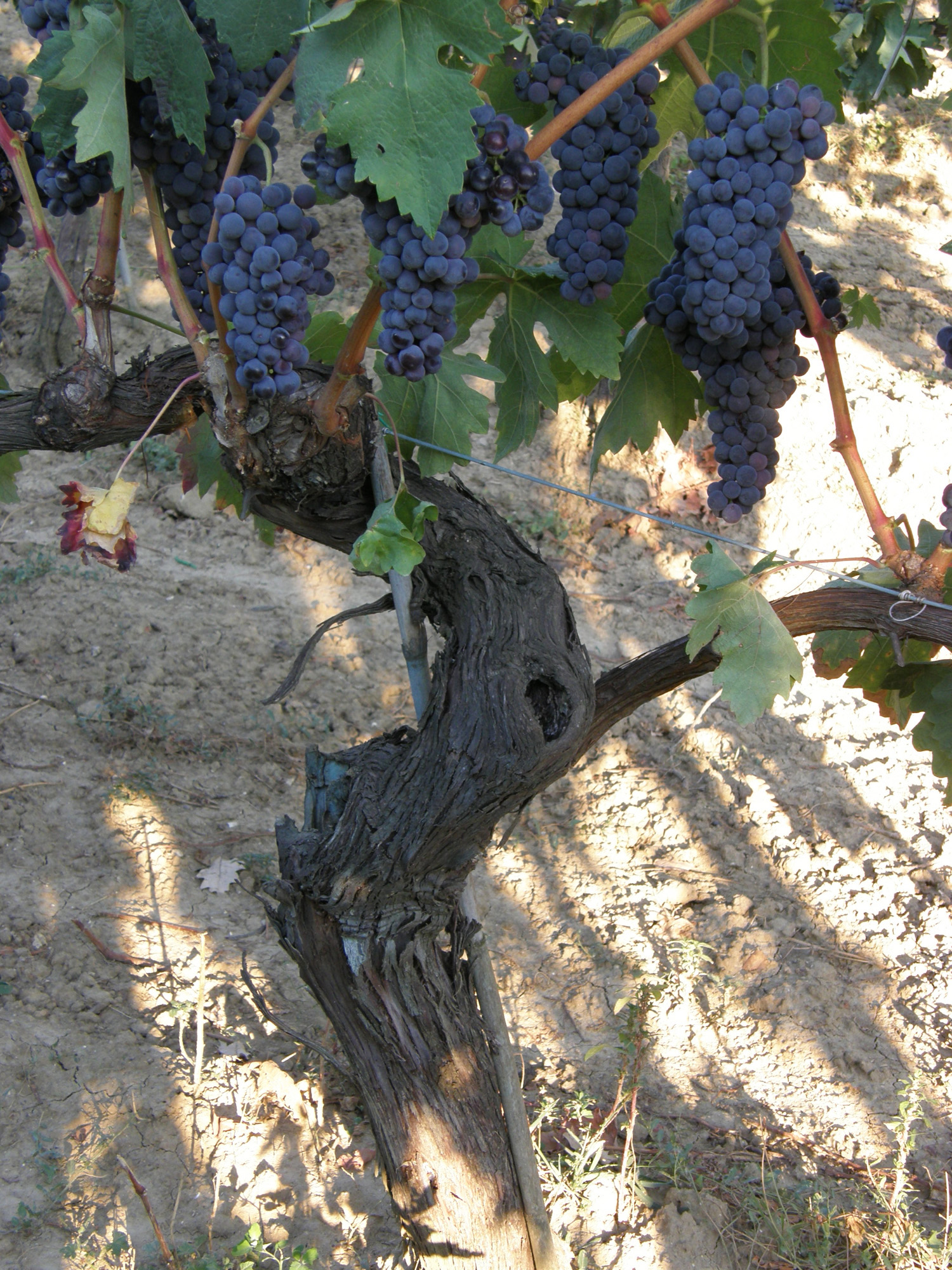
Ripening Tempranillo grapes

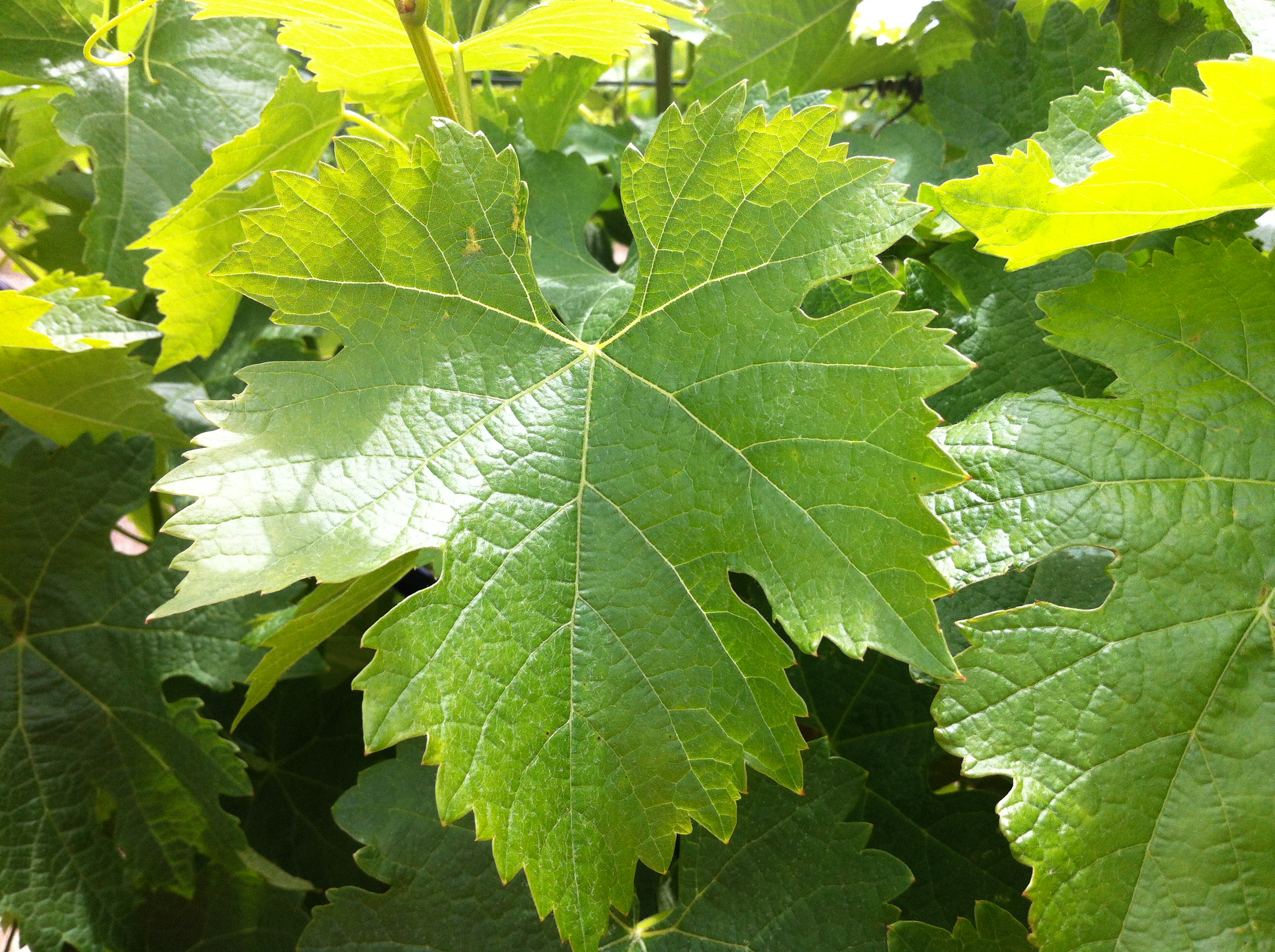
Tempranillo leaf

Tempranillo (also known as Ull de Llebre, Cencibel, Tinto Fino and Tinta del País in Spain, Aragonez or Tinta Roriz in Portugal, and several other synonyms elsewhere) is a black grape variety widely grown to make full-bodied red wines in its native Spain. Its name is the diminutive of the Spanish temprano ("early"), a reference to the fact that it ripens several weeks earlier than most Spanish red grapes. Tempranillo has been grown on the Iberian Peninsula since the time of Phoenician settlements. It is the main grape used in Rioja, and is often referred to as Spain's noble grape. The grape has been planted throughout the globe's wine regions.

In 2015, Tempranillo was the fourth most widely planted wine grape variety worldwide with 232,561 hectares (574,670 acres) under vine, of which 87% was in Spain where it is the most planted red grape variety.

Unlike more aromatic red wine varieties like Cabernet Sauvignon, Sangiovese and Pinot noir, Tempranillo has a relatively neutral profile so it is often blended with other varieties, such as Grenache and Carignan (known in Rioja as Mazuelo), or aged for extended periods in oak where the wine easily takes on the flavor of the barrel. Varietal examples of Tempranillo usually exhibit flavors of plum and strawberries.

Tempranillo is an early ripening variety that tends to thrive in chalky vineyard soils such as those of the Ribera del Duero region of Spain. In Portugal, where the grape is known as Tinta Roriz and Aragonez, it is blended with others to produce port wine.

== History and mutation ==
In 2012, Tempranillo was discovered to be a natural cross between Albillo Mayor and a forgotten grape variety called Benedicto. Tempranillo used to be thought to be related to the Pinot noir grape. According to legend, Cistercian monks left Pinot noir cuttings at monasteries along their pilgrimage to Santiago de Compostela. However, ampelographic studies have shown no genetic connection between the cultivars.

Spanish cultivation of Vitis vinifera, the common ancestor of almost all vines in existence today, began in earnest with Phoenician settlement in the southern provinces. Later, according to the Roman writer Columella, wines were grown all over Spain; yet there are only scattered references to the name "Tempranillo". Ribera del Duero wine making extends back over 2,000 years, as evidenced by the 66-metre mosaic of Bacchus, the Roman god of wine, that was unearthed in 1972, at Baños de Valdearados.

It is possible that this grape was introduced to the Western Hemisphere by the Spanish Conquistadors in the 17th century, as certain Criolla varieties in Argentina have a closer genetic relationship to Tempranillo than to a small handful of other European varieties against which the Criolla varieties were tested. Despite its apparent fragility, Tempranillo travelled widely during the 20th century and, following much trial and error, has become established throughout the world. In 1905, Frederic Bioletti brought Tempranillo to California where it received a cool reception not only due to the encroaching era of Prohibition, but also because of the grape's dislike of hot, dry climates. It was much later, during the 1980s, that Californian Tempranillo wine production began to flourish, following the establishment of suitably mountainous sites. Production in this area has more than doubled since 1993.

During the 1990s, Tempranillo started experiencing a renaissance in wine production worldwide. This surge began partly as a result of the efforts of a 'new wave' of Spanish growers who showed that it was possible to produce wines of great character and quality in areas outside of the Rioja region. One result of this has been that Tempranillo varietal wines have become more common, especially in the better-suited, cooler Spanish regions like Ribera del Duero, Navarra, and Penedès (DO). During the 1990s, growers in Australia and South Africa started significant Tempranillo plantations.

== Viticulture ==
Tempranillo is a black grape with a thick skin. It grows best at relatively high altitudes, but it also can tolerate a much warmer climate. With regard to Tempranillo's production in various climates, wine expert Oz Clarke notes:

To get elegance and acidity out of Tempranillo, you need a cool climate. But to get high sugar levels and the thick skins that give deep color you need heat. In Spain these two opposites are best reconciled in the continental climate but high altitude of the Ribera del Duero.

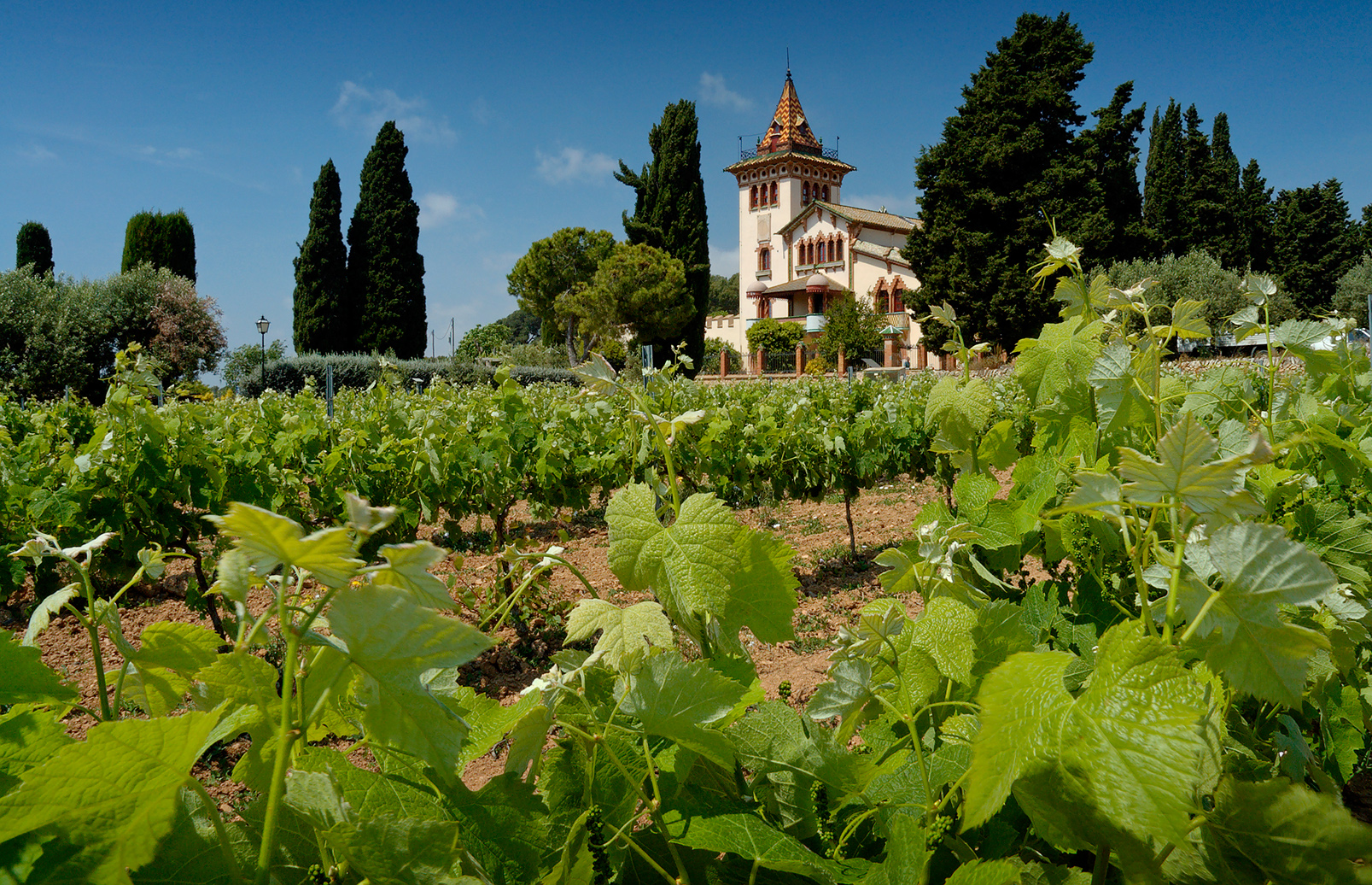
Tempranillo vines in Penedès region, Barcelona Province

In the Ribera del Duero the average July temperature is around 21.4° Celsius (70.5° Fahrenheit), though temperatures in the middle of the day in the lower valley can jump as high as 40 °C (104 °F). At night the region experiences a dramatic diurnal temperature variation, with temperatures dropping by as much as 16 °C (61 °F) from the daytime high. The Tempranillo grape is one of the few grapes that can adapt and thrive in continental Mediterranean climates like this.

Pests and diseases are a serious problem for this grape variety, since it has little resistance to either. The grape forms compact, cylindrical bunches of spherical, deep blue-black fruit with a colourless pulp. The leaves are large with five overlapping lobes.

The Tempranillo root absorbs potassium easily, which facilitates pH levels of 3.6 in the pulp and 4.3 in the skin when it reaches maturity. If it absorbs too much potassium, the must becomes salified (increased levels of salt), which slows the disappearance of malic acid, resulting in a higher pH. The skin does not present any herbaceous characters. The grape is very susceptible to inclement weather, contracting when there is a drought and swelling when there is too much humidity. The swelling has a negative effect on quality since it affects the colour of the wine. The effects of the weather are attenuated in places with limestone because of the effect of the clay and humidity in the roots; the effects are worse in sandy areas, as well as for vines that are less than twelve years old, as the roots are generally too superficial.

== Wines ==
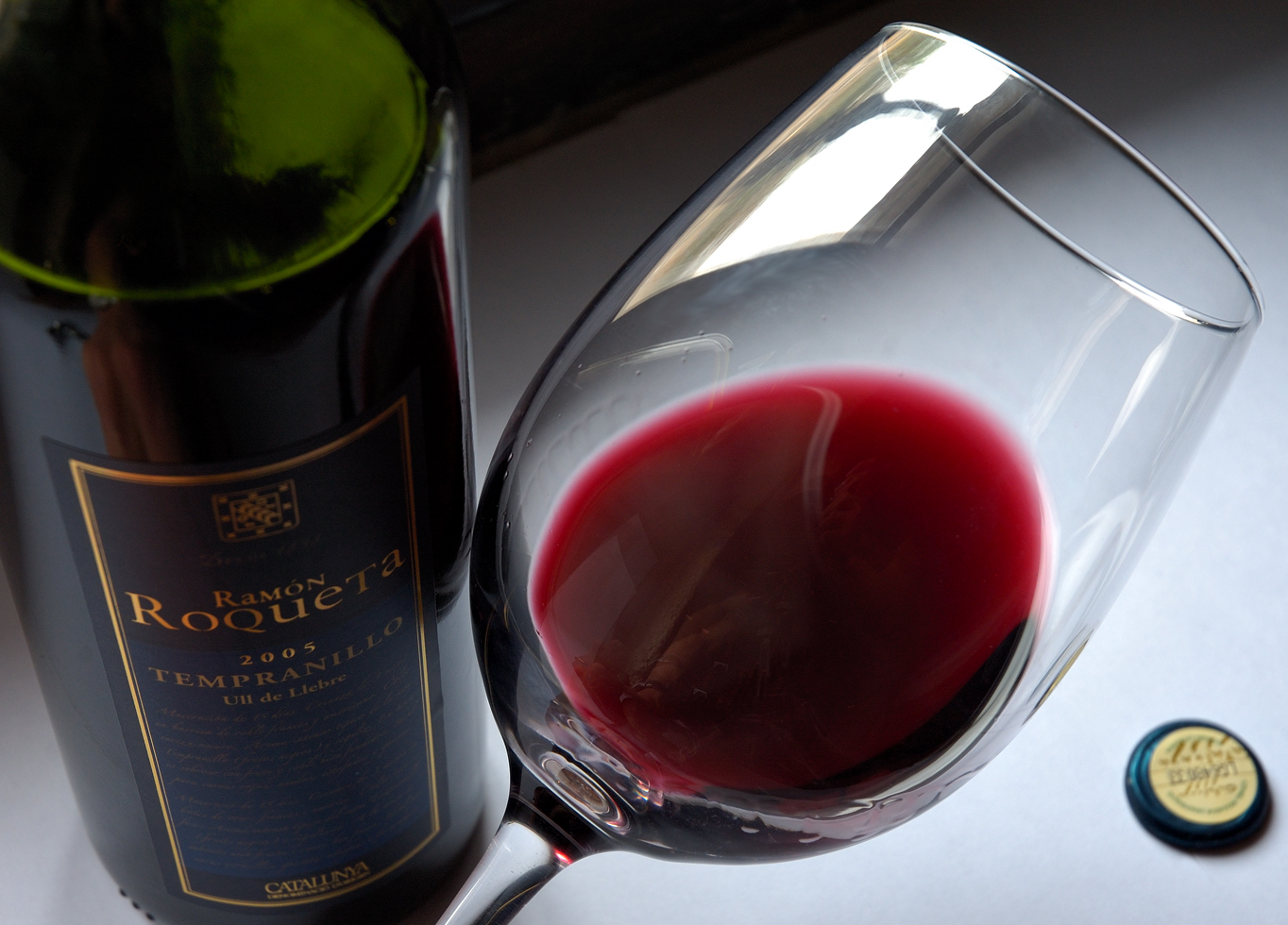
A Tempranillo varietal wine in a glass, showing typically intense purple colouring

Tempranillo wines are ruby red in colour, while aromas and flavours can include berries, plum, tobacco, vanilla, leather and herb. Often making up as much as 90% of a blend, Tempranillo is less frequently bottled as a single varietal. Being low in both acidity and sugar content, it is most commonly blended with Grenache (known as Garnacha in Spain), Carignan (known as Mazuela in Spain), Graciano, Merlot and Cabernet Sauvignon. Blending the grape with Carignan makes a brighter and more acidic wine. Tempranillo is the major component of the typical Rioja blends and constitutes 90-100% of Ribera del Duero wines. In Australia, Tempranillo is blended with Grenache and Shiraz, also known as Syrah. In Portugal, where it is known as Tinta Roriz, it is a major grape in the production of some Port wines.

== Regions ==
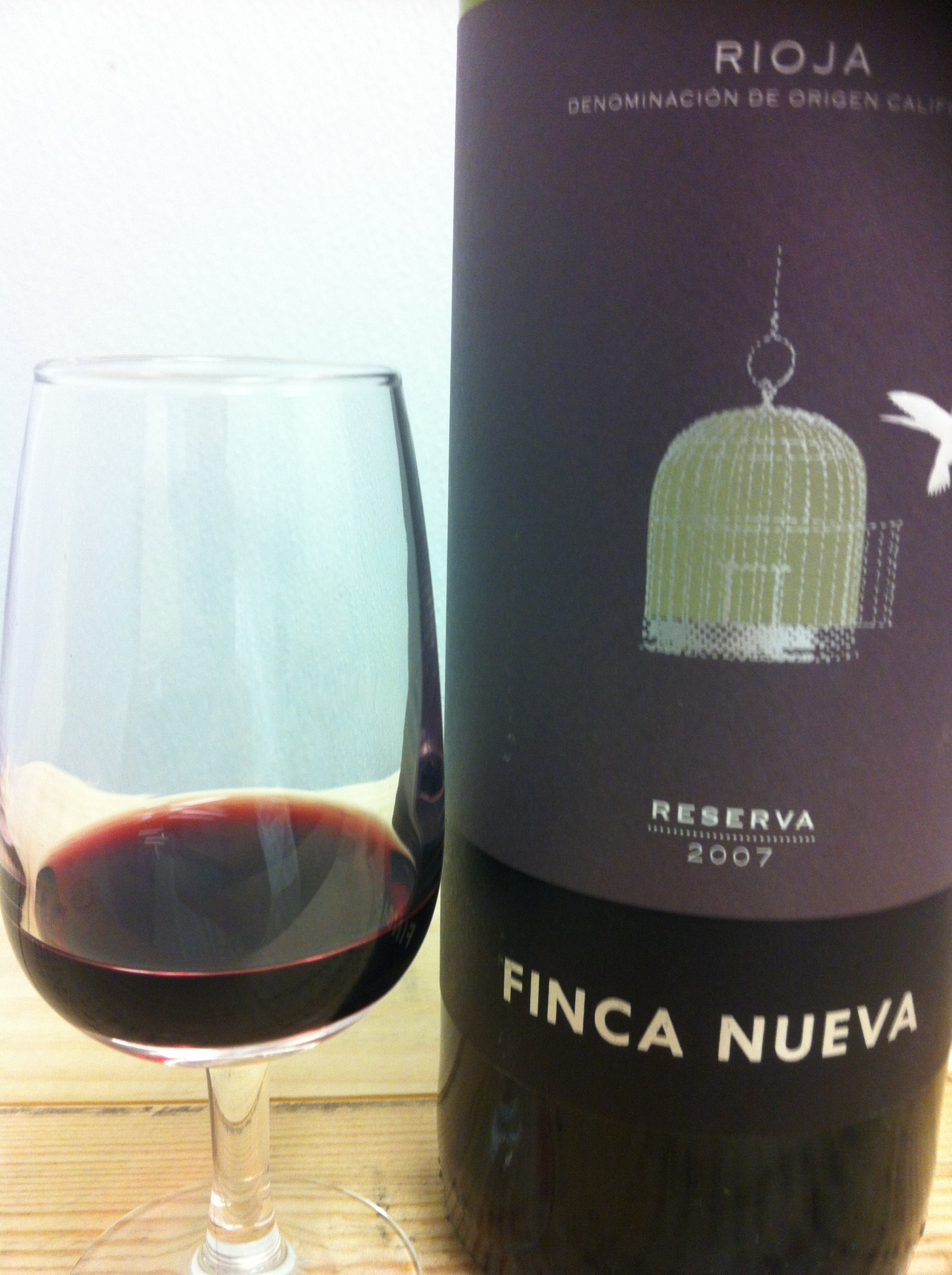
A Reserva level Rioja.

=== Spain ===
Spain grows 87% of the world's Tempranillo, and it is Spain's most planted red grape variety with 201,051 hectares (496,810 acres) grown in 2015, accounting for 42% of the red grape plantings, surpassed only by the white grape variety Airén. Tempranillo is native to northern Spain and widely cultivated as far south as Andalusia. The two major regions that grow Tempranillo are Rioja, in north central Spain, and Ribera del Duero, which lies a little farther to the south. Substantial quantities are also grown in the Penedès, Navarra and Valdepeñas regions.

Tempranillo is known under a number of local synonyms in different regions of Spain: "Cencibel" and "Tinto Fino" are used in several regions, and it is known as "Tinta del País" in Ribera del Duero and the surrounding area, "Tinta de Toro" in Toro, and "Ull de llebre" in Catalonia.

=== Portugal ===
The grape plays a role in the production of wines in two regions of Portugal, central Alentejo and Douro. In Alentejo Central, it is known as Aragonez and used in red table wine blends of variable quality, while in the Douro, it is known as Tinta Roriz and mainly used in blends to make port wine.

=== New World production ===
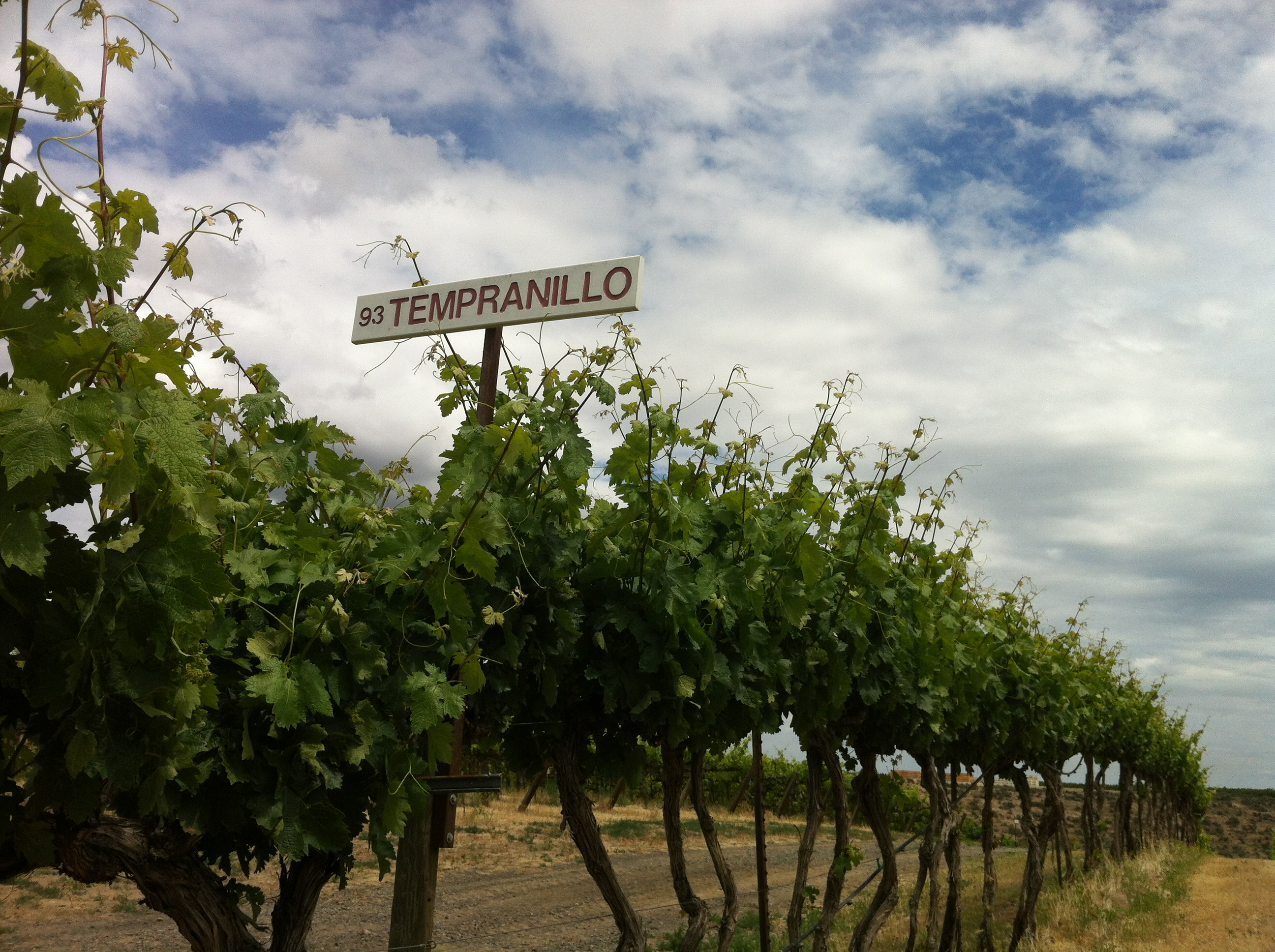
The original 1993 planting of Tempranillo at Red Willow Vineyard in Washington state.

Tempranillo arrived in California bearing the name Valdepeñas, and it was grown in the Central Valley at the turn of the 20th century. Since the climate of the Central Valley was not ideal for the grape, it was used as a blending grape for jug wine. California has since started to use it for fine wines, particularly in Napa and Monterey. In Texas, the soils of the High Plains and Hill Country have been compared to those of northern Spain. Tempranillo has been well received in Texas and has grown to be considered the state's signature grape.

In Oregon, the grape was introduced by Earl Jones of Abacela Vineyards and Winery, in the Umpqua Valley AVA. Their climate (hot during the summer day, and cool overnight) seems to be perfect for the Tempranillo grape. In Australia Tempranillo is grown in the McLaren Vale region, and also North East Victoria. Tempranillo has also been introduced by some wine producers in Thailand. The varietal is extensively grown in Argentina, Chile, and Mexico.

In Washington state, Tempranillo was one of the varieties pioneered in the state by Red Willow Vineyard in the Yakima Valley AVA with its first commercial planting of the variety in 1993.

== Synonyms ==
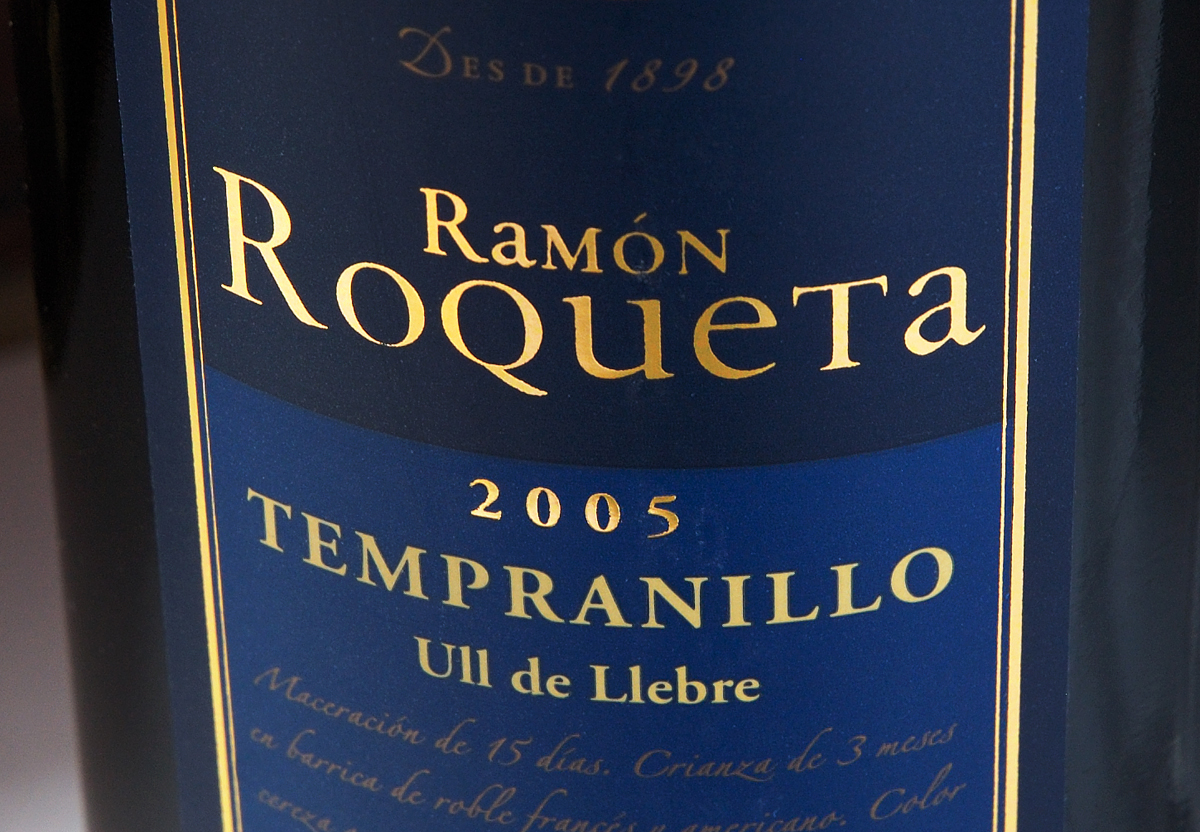
Label showing both Tempranillo and the synonym used in Catalonia, Ull de Llebre.

Tempranillo is known by other names in certain regions. These include:

Albillo Negro, Aldepenas, Aragon, Aragones, Aragonez, Aragonez 51, Aragonez da Ferra, Aragonez de Elvas, Araúxa, Arganda, Arinto Tinto, Cencibel, Cencibera, Chinchillana, Chinchillano, Chinchilyano, Cupani, De Por Aca, Escobera, Garnacho Fono, Grenache de Logrono, Jacibera, Jacibiera, Jacivera, Juan Garcia, Negra de Mesa, Negretto, Ojo de Liebre, Olho de Lebre, Pinuela, Sensibel, Tempranilla, Tempranillo de la Rioja, Tempranillo de Perralta, Tempranillo de Rioja, Tempranillo de Rioza, Tempranillo Rioja, Tinta Aragones, Tinta Corriente, Tinta de Madrid, Tinta de Santiago, Tinta de Toro, Tinta do Inacio, Tinta do Pais, Tinta Fina, Tinta Madrid, Tinta Monteira, Tinta Monteiro, Tinta Roris, Tinta Roriz, Tinta Santiago, Tinto Aragon, Tinto Aragonez, Tinto de la Ribera, Tinto de Madrid, Tinto de Rioja, Tinto de Toro, Tinto del Pais, Tinto del Toro, Tinto Fino, Tinto Madrid, Tinto Pais, Tinto Ribiera, Tinto Riojano, Ull de Liebre, Ull de Llebre, Valdepenas, Verdiell, Vid de Aranda.

== See also ==
- List of Port wine grapes
- International Grape Genome Program
- International variety
- List of Portuguese grape varieties
- Phoenicians and wine
