= Ribera del Duero =

Spanish wine region

Coordinates: 41°41′N 3°41′W

Ribera del Duero DOP
- Wine region
- Ribera del Duero DOP in the provinces of Burgos, Valladolid, Segovia and Soria in the region of Castile and León
- Official name: D.O. Ribera del Duero
- Type: Denominación de Origen Protegida (DOP)
- Year established: 1982
- Country: Spain
- Size of planted vineyards: 22,395 hectares (55,339 acres)
- Wine produced: 915,978 hectolitres
- Comments: Data for 2016 / 2017

Ribera del Duero is a Spanish Denominación de Origen Protegida (DOP) located in the country's northern plateau and is one of eleven 'quality wine' regions within the autonomous community of Castile and León. It is also one of several recognised wine-producing regions to be found along the course of the Duero river.

The region is characterised by a largely flat, rocky terrain and is centred on the town of Aranda de Duero, although the most famous vineyards surround Peñafiel and Roa de Duero to the west, where the regional regulatory council or Consejo Regulador for the denominación is based.

Ribera del Duero was named Wine Region of the Year 2012 by Wine Enthusiast Magazine.

== History ==
Wine has been produced in the region for thousands of years, but viticulture as we know it probably arrived in the Ribera del Duero region with Benedictine monks from Cluny in the Burgundy region of France in the twelfth century. Ribera del Duero wine making goes back over 2,000 years as evidenced by the 66-meter mosaic of Bacchus, the god of wine that was unearthed relatively recently at Baños de Valdearados.

Official seal of the Ribera del Duero denominación de origen (DO)

The denominación de origen (D.O.) of Ribera del Duero was founded on 21 July 1982 by an organization of wine producers and growers who were determined to promote the quality of their wines and enforce regulatory standards. Reports that it was set to be upgraded to denominación de origen calificada (DOCa) status in 2008 proved to be unfounded and, as at 2011, it remains a DO and has no plans to change.

Ribero del Duero wines are currently enjoying greater popularity, thanks largely to the considerable interest shown in the area by experienced growers from other regions.

== Geography ==
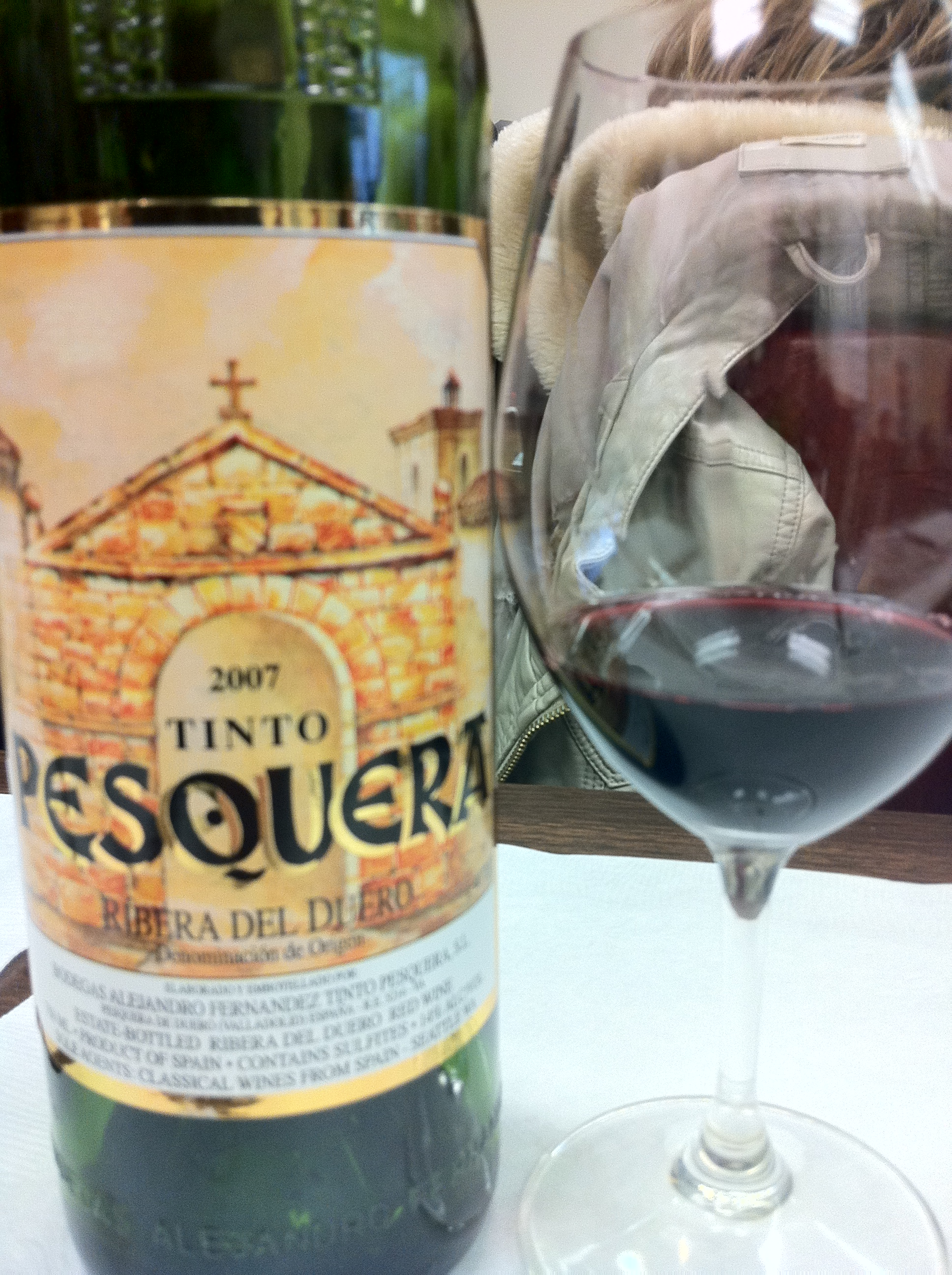
A 2007 Ribera del Duero from Pesquera.

The Ribera del Duero is located on the extensive, elevated northern plateau of the Iberian Peninsula. It occupies the southern plains of the province of Burgos, extends west into Valladolid and includes parts of Segovia and Soria provinces to the south and east, respectively. As its name suggests, the region follows the course of the Duero river for approximately 115 kilometres (71 mi) upstream from Valladolid and is around 35 kilometres (22 mi) at its widest. The region is located around the younger stretches of the river, which later passes through the nearby Toro and Rueda regions before traversing the famous Portuguese growing areas of Douro and Porto, where it drains into the Atlantic Ocean.

Geologically, tertiary sediments, consisting of gently lenticular layers of silty or clayey sand, alternate with layers of limestone, marl and chalky concretions. The Duero valley, formed during the Miocene period, has a flat, rocky, gently undulating terrain, ranging from 911 metres (2,989 ft) down to 750 metres (2,460 ft) above sea level. The national highway N122 follows the river valley.

The Ribera del Duero has moderate to low rainfall (450 millimetres (18 in) per year) and is exposed to quite extreme climatic conditions; long, dry summers with temperatures of up to 40 °C (104 °F) are followed by hard winters during which temperatures often come close to freezing. There are also marked variations in temperature within each season. The climate is continental and Mediterranean, with more than 2,400 hours of annual sunlight.

Vineyards occupy around 120 square kilometres (46 sq mi) of the region, most of which are situated in the province of Burgos, with around 5 square kilometres (1.9 sq mi) in Valladolid and 6 square kilometres (2.3 sq mi) in Soria.

== Grapes ==
Wines produced in the Ribera del Duero DO derive almost exclusively from red grapes. The vast majority of production is dedicated to Tinto Fino (the local name for Tempranillo (Note: Local growers consider Tinto Fino to be a genetic mutation of Rioja's Tempranillo, although there is no hard evidence for this at present.)), the dominant red varietal in the northern half of the Spanish peninsula. Tinto Fino is often, but not always, complemented with Cabernet Sauvignon, Malbec and Merlot, although the famous Tinto Pesquera, grown by Alejandro Fernández in Pesquera de Duero, is a 100% Tempranillo varietal wine. The introduction of Pesquera's 100% Tinto Fino wine was, at the time, somewhat controversial, as the considered benchmark Vega Sicilia wines traditionally blended Tinto Fino with such Bordeaux varietals as Merlot, Cabernet Sauvignon and Malbec.

The DOP's authorized red grapes are: Tinto Fino, Cabernet Sauvignon, Merlot, Malbec, and Garnacha Tinta. The Albillo grape is the only authorized white variety grown, for white wines that are mostly destined for local consumption.

== Main Wineries ==
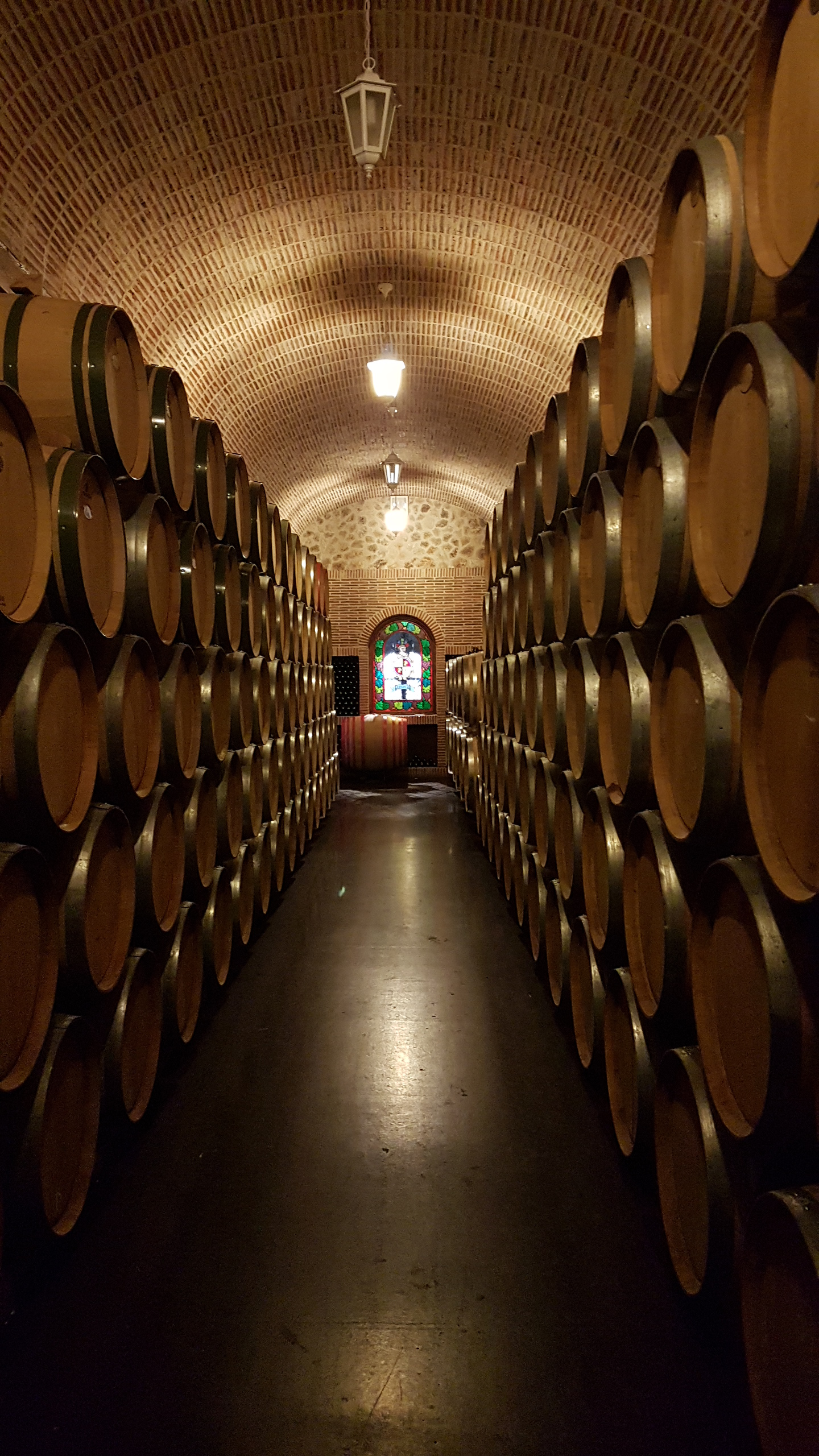
Wine barrels in Bodegas Casajús, in Quintana del Pidio.

There are more than 300 wineries that belong to the D.O., some of them are:

- Burgos: Bodegas Casajús, Páramo de Corcos, Pago de los Capellanes, Bodegas TresPiedras, Dominio Basconcillos, Adrada Ecológica, Casado Alvides, Viña Sastre, Frutos Aragón, Ortega Fournier, Balbás, Linaje Garsea, García Figuero, Izquierdo, Félix Callejo, Cillar de Silos, Ismael Arroyo, Real Sitio Ventosilla, Martín Berdugo, Peñalba, Neo, Valduero, Imperiales, Pascual, Señorío de Nava, Pérez Pascuas, Virgen de la Asunción, Monte Aixa, Montegaredo, Pomar Viñedos, Torres de Anguix, Áster, López Cristóbal, Condado de Haza, Viña Solorca, Páramo de Guzmán, Andrés Matey, Gallego Zapatero, Viyuela, Valle de Monzón, Los Matucos, Prado de Olmedo, Muntra, Portia, San Mamés, Valderiz, S.A.T. San Pablo, Asenjo & Manso, Grandes Bodegas, Fuentenarro, Pagos del Rey, Viña Arnáiz, Santa Eulalia.
- Valladolid: Vega Sicilia, Abadia Retuerta (not in the DOP), Pago de Carraovejas, Bodegas Protos, Sarmentero, Selección de Torres, Dehesa de los Canónigos, Comenge, Legaris, Dominio de Pingus, Postigo Vergel, Montebaco, Señorío de Bocos, Zifar, Tinto Pesquera, Yllera, Hacienda Monasterio, Viñedos del Jaro, Alión, Matarromera, Emilio Moro, Emina, Montecastro, Arzuaga Navarro, Valtravieso, Tamaral, Castillo de Peñafiel, Peñafalcón, Resalte, Pingón, Viña Mayor.
- Soria: Valdeviñas.
- Segovia: Aldekoa.

== Production ==
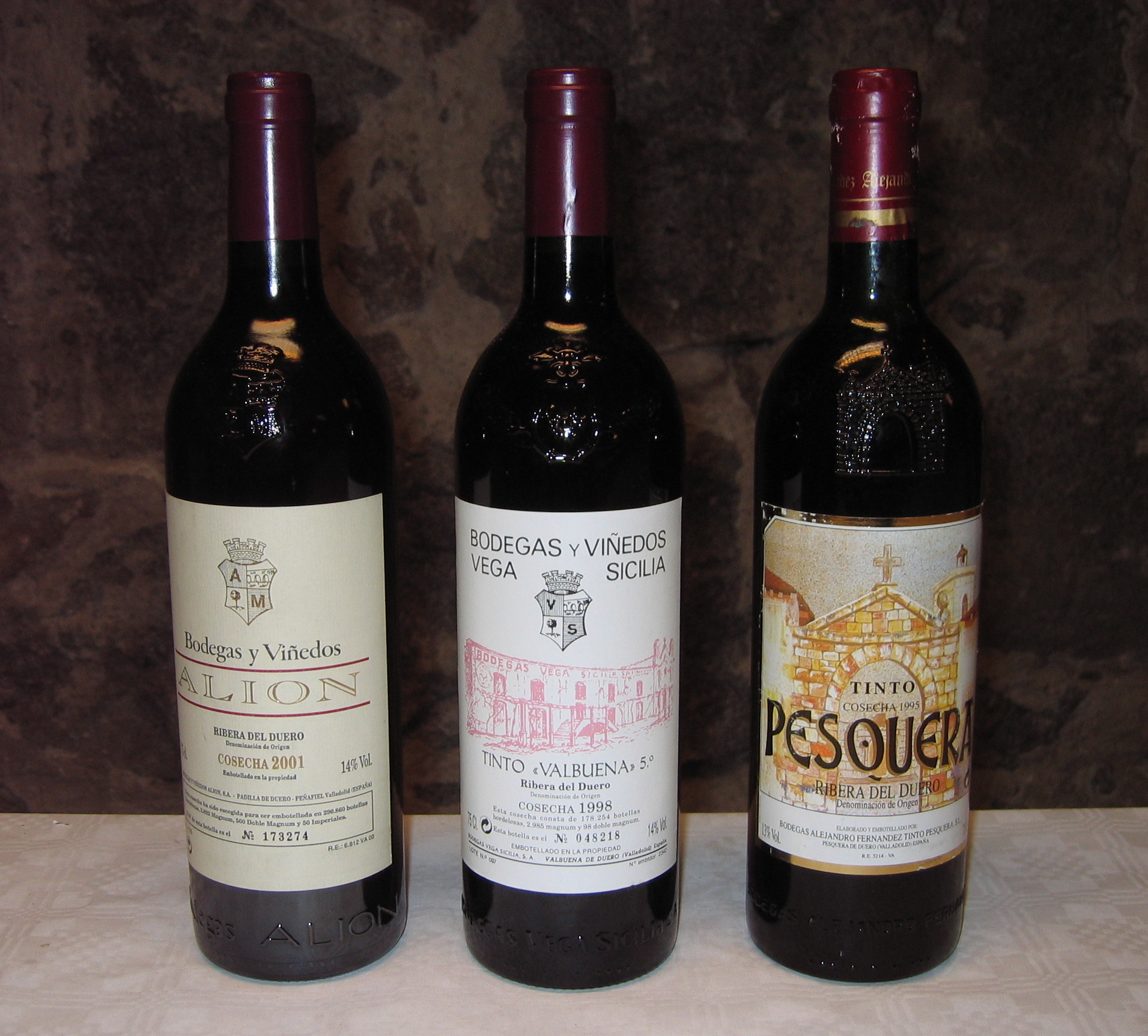
Wine bottles from three well-known bodegas in Ribera del Duero: Alion, Vega Sicilia (here its second wine, Valbuena 5°) and Pesquera

There are similarities between Rioja and Ribera del Duero. Whereas the wines are quite distinctive as a result of significant differences in terroir, both regions produce wines selected for long aging with highly complex vinification procedures, producing intense, extremely long-lived wines emanating from largely limestone soils. Wines are classified as much for their longevity as their grape quality, and Ribera del Duero produces some extremely well-aging wines. The aging requirements for Ribera del Duero are the same used in Rioja. Wines labelled as "Crianza" must age two years with 12 months in oak. "Reserva" wines must be aged at least three years with at least 12 months in oak. The "Gran Reserva" labelled wines must spend 5 years aging prior to release, two being in oak.

The town of Pesquera is particularly noted for its wines and the area around La Horra (another small town in the region) is respected by locals for its consistent quality. Viña Sastre is one of the region's more respected wine producers and the world-renowned Vega Sicilia easily the most famous. Vega Sicilia's more eminent customers include Charles III of the British royal family, while Alex Ferguson's favourite wine is Pesquera.. Another outstanding and bio winery is Bodega Páramo Arroyo, a family-owned project with all their production certified as ecological since foundation.

== See also ==
- Spanish wine
- Cuisine of the province of Valladolid
