= French oak =

French oak may refer to:

- Quercus robur, a species of tree
- the wood used in making wine casks, see Oak (wine)
