= Casajús =

Spanish winery

Coordinates: 41.760886°N 3.749992°W

Bodegas J.A. Calvo Casajús
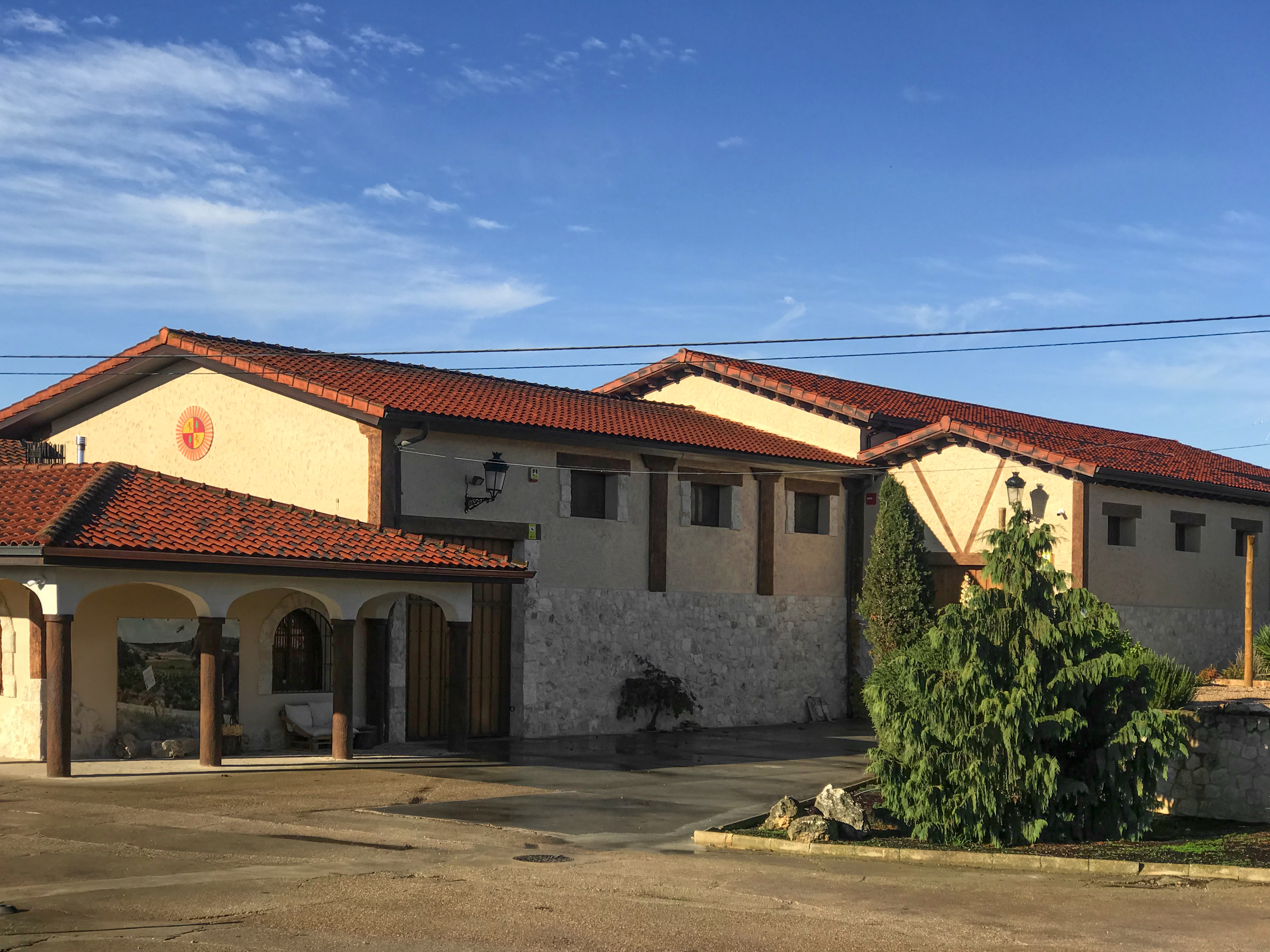
- Company type: Ltd
- Industry: Spanish wine
- Founded: 1993
- Founder: José Alberto Calvo Casajús
- Headquarters: Quintana del Pidio, Spain
- Area served: Worldwide
- Products: Red wine and Rosé
- Website: bodegascasajus.com

Casajús or Casajús Winery, in Spanish: Bodegas Casajús, is a Spanish fine winery. It is situated in the town of Quintana del Pidio (province of Burgos, Spain), in the Protected Designation of Origin (Denominación de origen) Ribera del Duero. Over generations, the Calvo and Casajús families developed their own family wines, although it was not until 1993 that José Alberto Calvo Casajús founded the winery.

The winery gained international recognition thanks to the great appraisals from the American wine magazine, Robert Parker’s The Wine Advocate upon reviewing Casajús Antiguos Viñedos and Vendimia Seleccionada, and in particular the signature wine, NIC.

== History ==
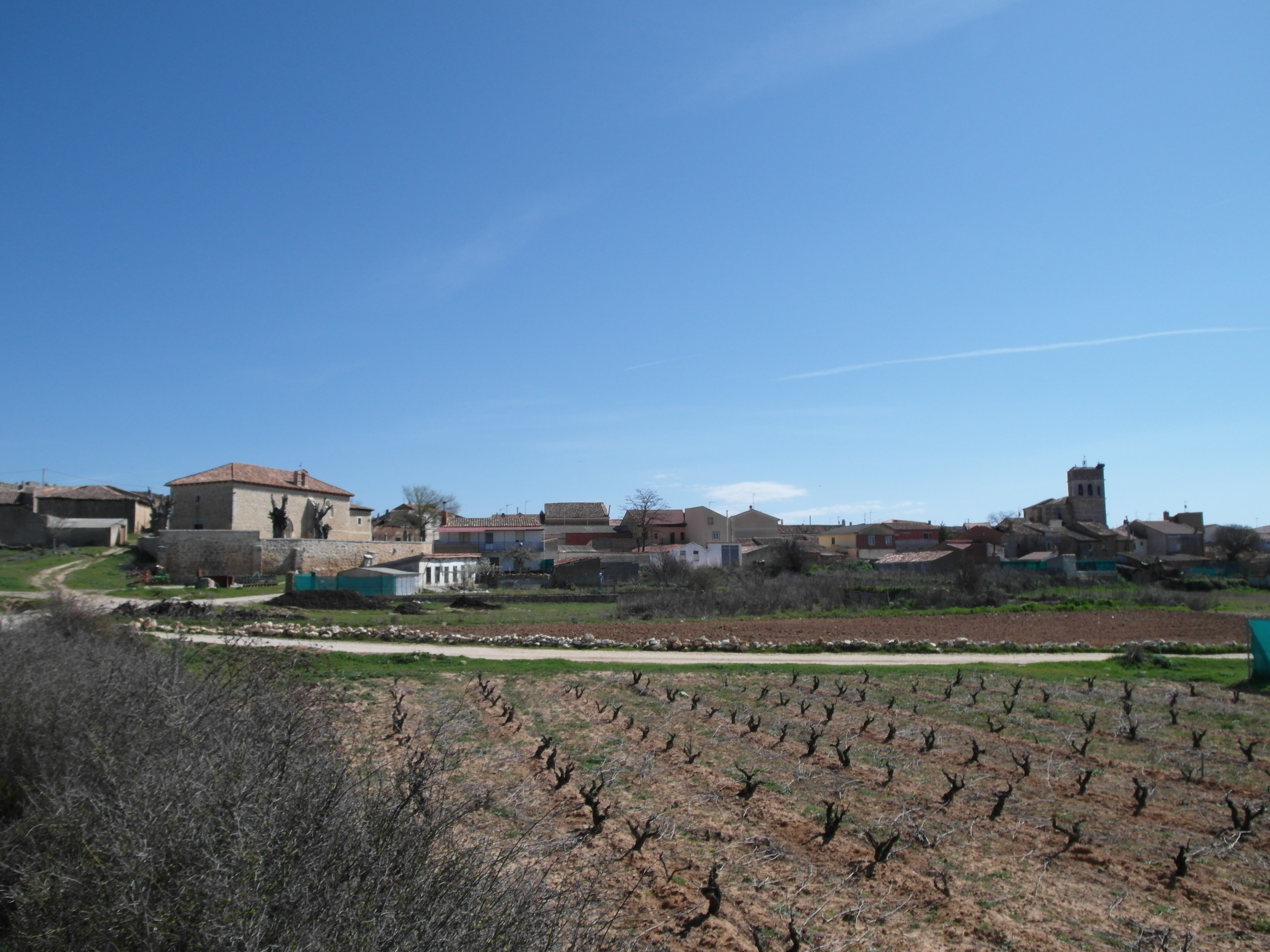
Views of Quintana del Pidio in the Denominación de Origen of Ribera del Duero.

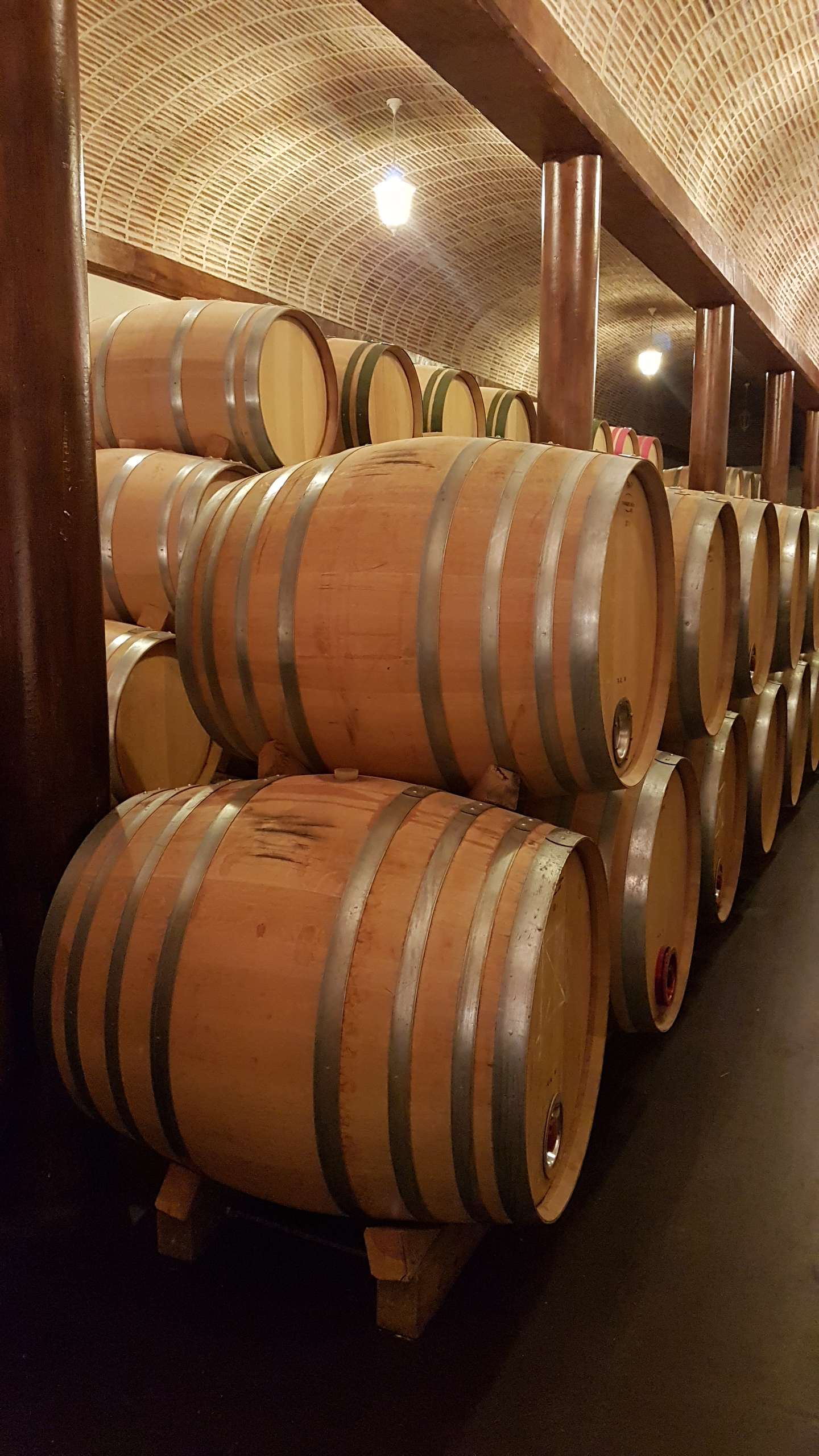
500-litre French oak wine barrels in Casajús Winery, in Ribera del Duero.

=== The 1920s ===
José Alberto's grandparents, and those of his wife Leonor, planted their vineyards in 1920, in Quintana del Pidio, in the heart of Ribera del Duero. Over generations, the Calvo and Casajús families developed their own wines in traditional cellars.

=== The 1960s ===
In 1963, a local wine cooperative "Los Olmos" was founded in Quintana del Pidio, of which José Alberto and Leonor's families were founding and active members until the start of the 1990s.

=== The 1990s and 2000s ===
In 1993 José Alberto left the local cooperative and founded his own winery in Quintana del Pidio: “Bodegas J.A. Calvo Casajús”, an activity that combined with José’s work as a baker. In 2004 production began of the signature wine, NIC, an acronym of his children's names, Nicolás and Catalina. In the middle of that same decade, the winery began to receive international recognition due to the positive reviews in Robert Parker’s The Wine Advocate.

=== The 2010s ===
In 2013 the winery received the highest scores in Ribera del Duero from the British critic, Neal Martin, for the American magazine Robert Parker’s The Wine Advocate. The NIC 2009 wine was awarded 97 points and Casajús Viñedos Antiguos wine received 95 points, this triggered the receipt of international media attention.

== Notable reviews ==
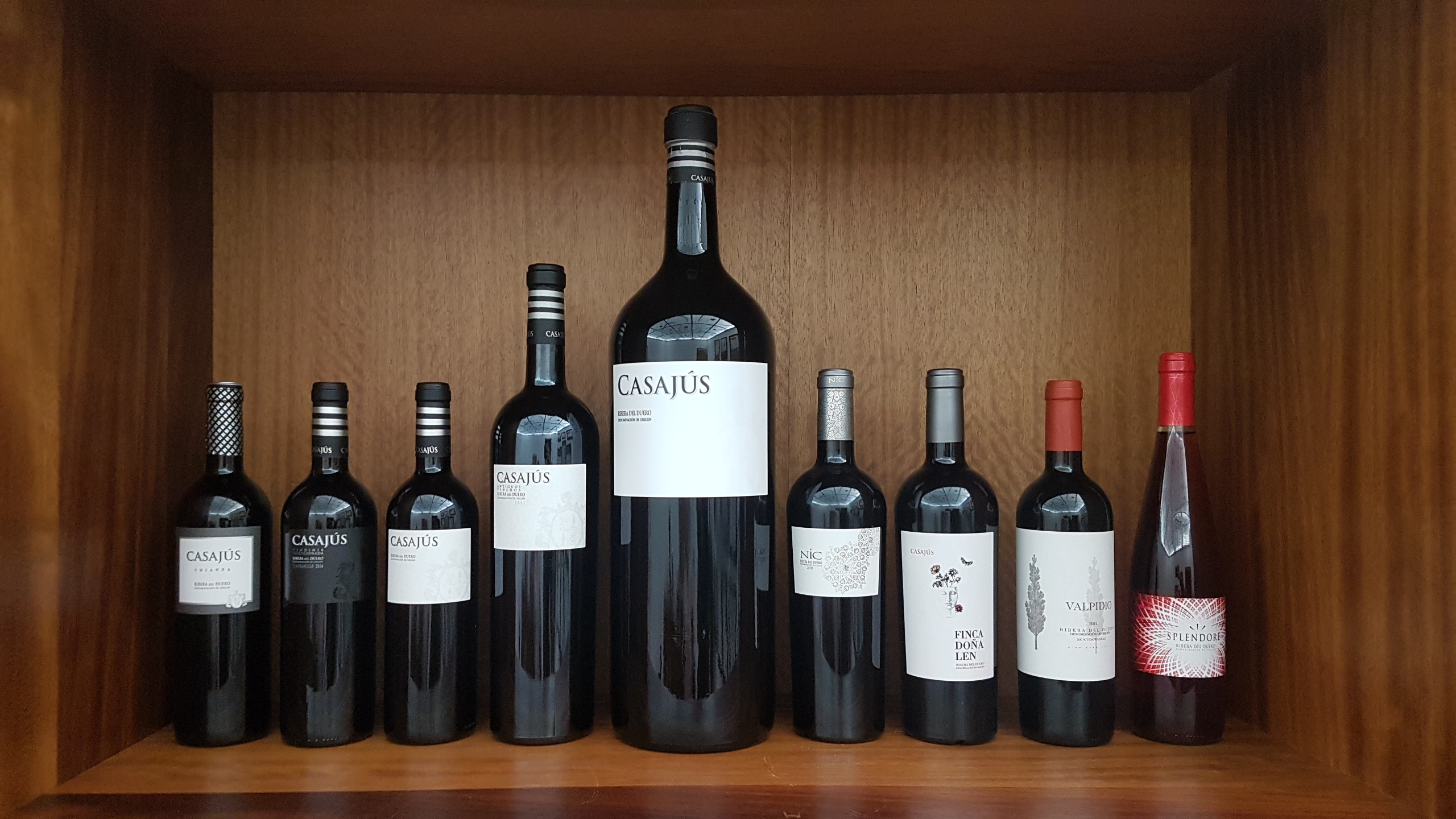
Bottles belonging to the Casajús winery.

According to Robert Parker’s The Wine Advocate magazine:

- NIC 2009: 97 points; 2005: 95+ points; 2006: 94+ points; 2011: 94 points; 2010: 93 points.
- Antiguos Viñedos 2009: 95 points; 2004 & 2012: 93 points; 2011: 92 points; 2005: 91 points.
- Vendimia Seleccionada 2010: 94 points; 2009: 93 points; 2005 & 2012: 92 points; 2006: 91 points.
- Splendore 2010: 93 points; 2007: 91 points.
- Valpidio 2011: 92 points; 2013 & 2014: 90 points.

According to Wine Spectator magazine:

- NIC 2010: 95 points.
- Antiguos Viñedos 2014: 93 points; 2011: 92 points.
- Vendimia Seleccionada 2014: 92 points.

== Gallery ==
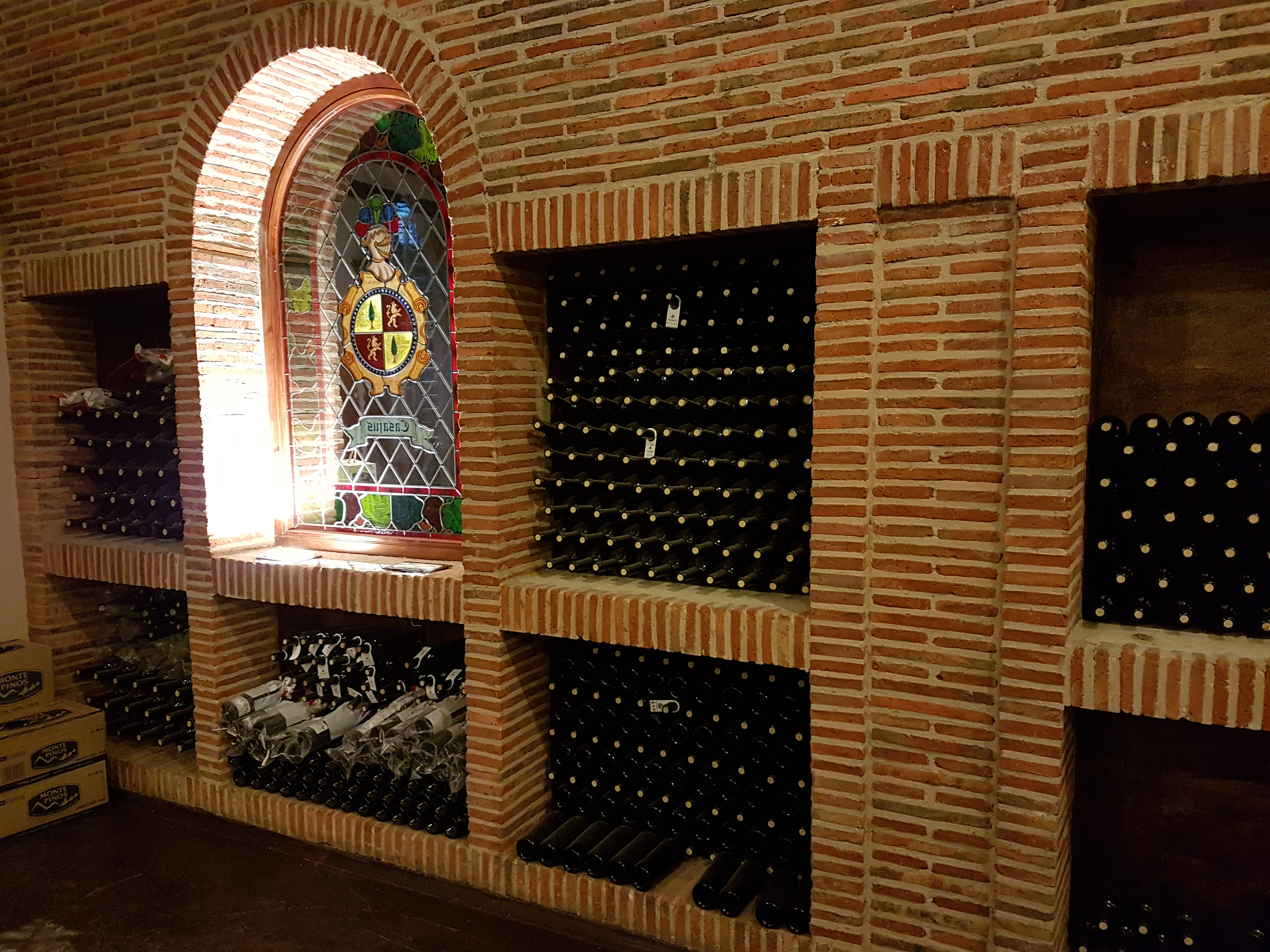
Bottle pantry in the Casajús winery.

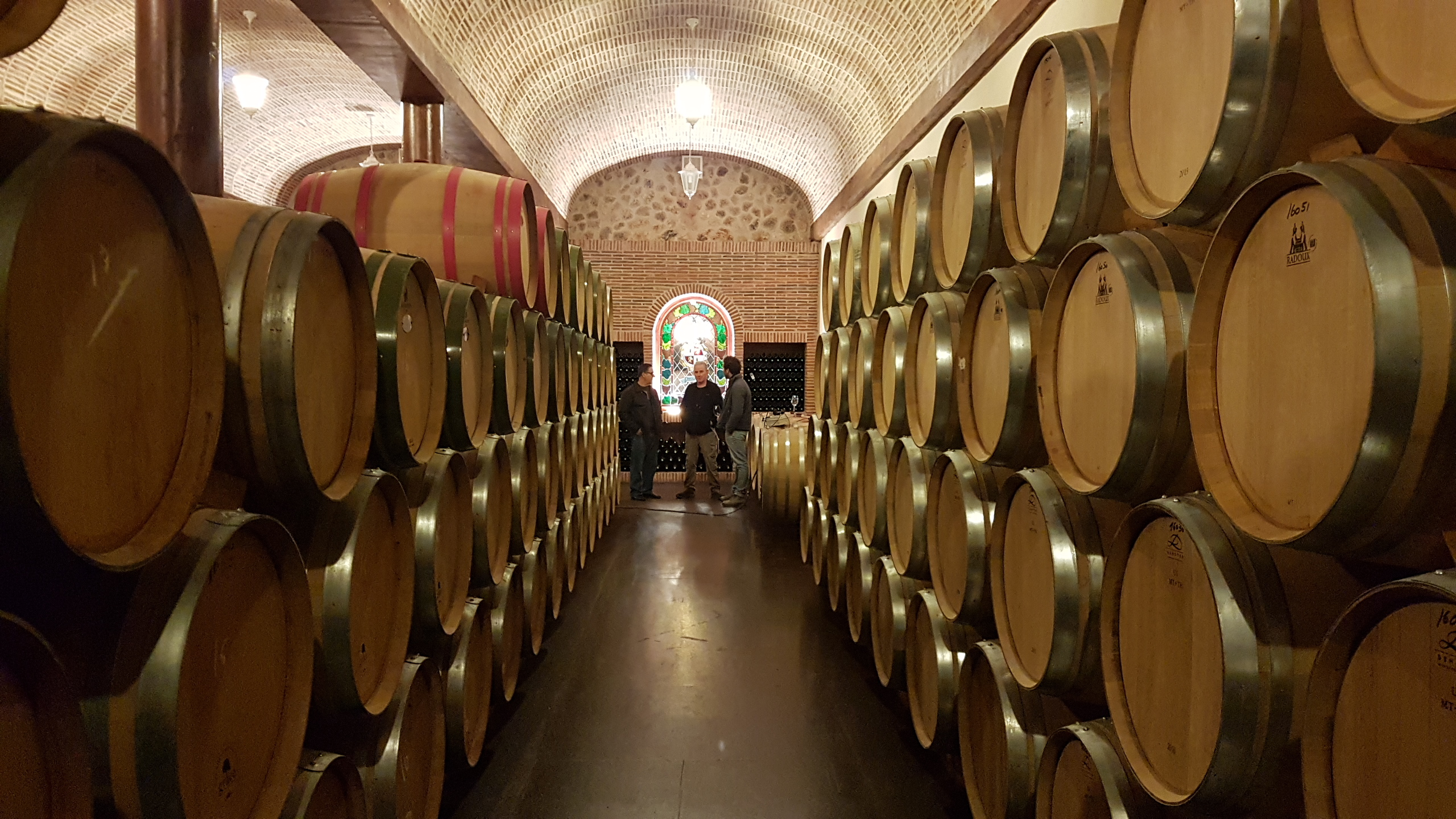
Casajús underground cellar.

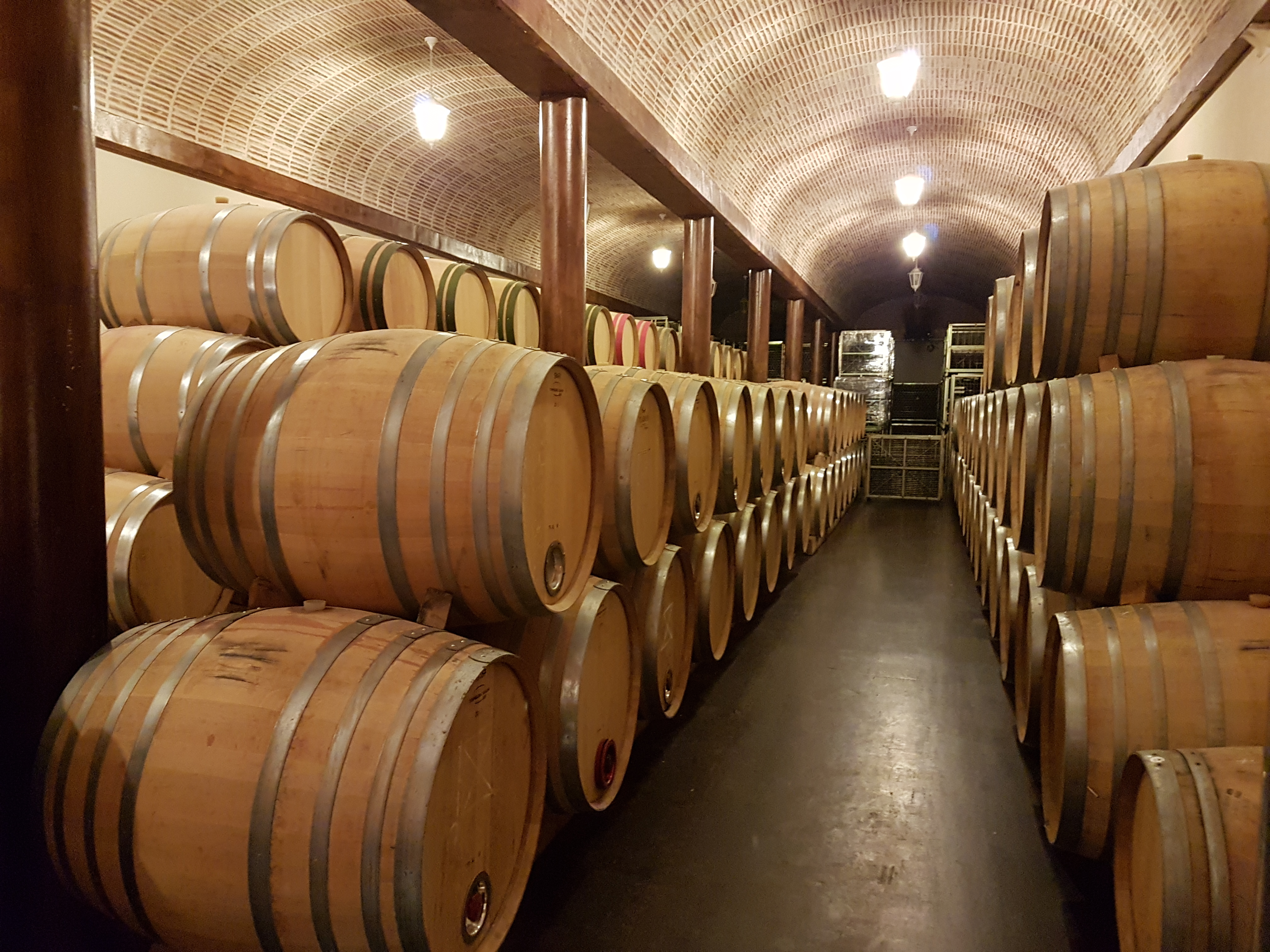
Wine barrels in the underground winery of Casajús.

== See also ==
- Ribera del Duero
- Spanish wine
- Robert M. Parker Jr.
