= Oak (wine) =

Barrel used in wine making

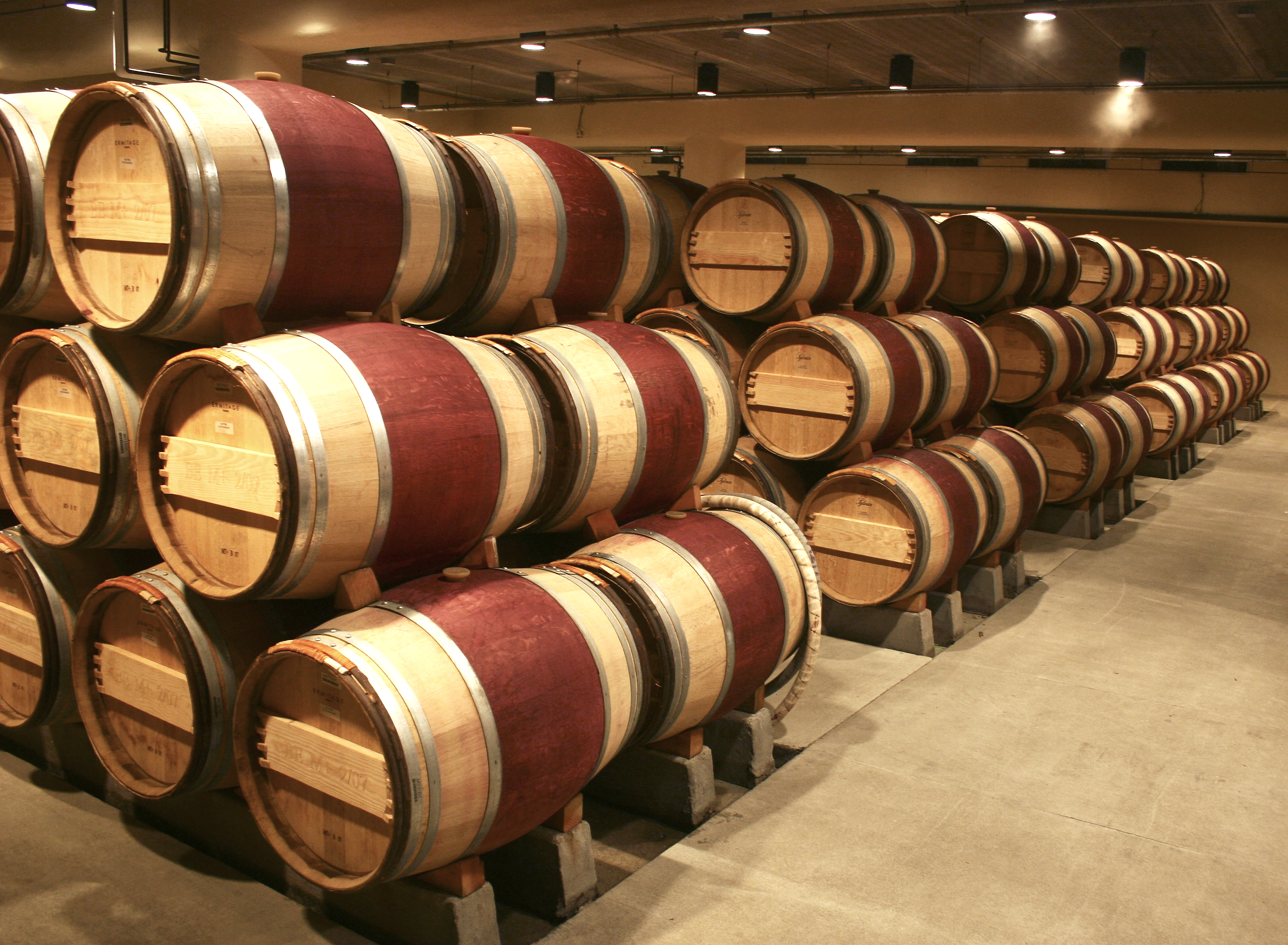
Oak wine barrels

Oak is used in winemaking to vary the color, flavor, tannin profile and texture of wine. It can be introduced in the form of a barrel during the fermentation or aging periods, or as free-floating chips or staves added to wine fermented in a vessel like stainless steel. Oak barrels can impart other qualities to wine through evaporation and low level exposure to oxygen.

== History ==
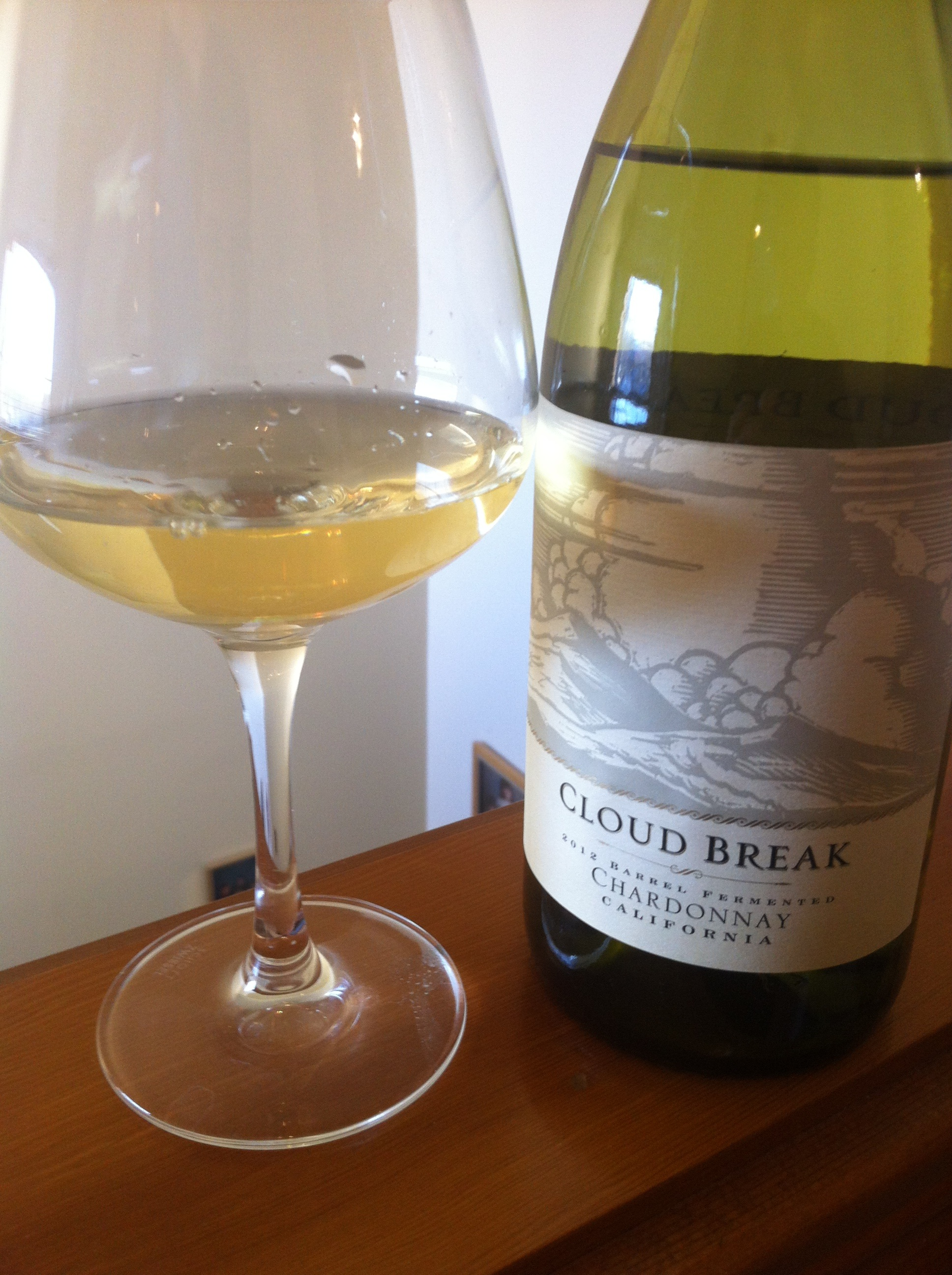
A California Chardonnay that shows on the label that it has been barrel fermented.

In early wine history, the amphora was the vessel of choice for the storage and transportation of wine. Due to the perishable nature of wood material it is difficult to trace the usage of barrels in history. The Greek historian Herodotus noted that ancient Mesopotamians used barrels made of palm wood to transport wine along the Euphrates. Palm is a difficult material to bend and fashion into barrels, however, and wine merchants in different regions experimented with different wood styles to find a better wood source. The use of oak has been prevalent in winemaking for at least two millennia, first coming into widespread use during the time of the Roman Empire. In time, winemakers discovered that beyond just storage convenience, wine kept in oak barrels took on properties that improved it by making it softer and, in some cases, better-tasting.

== Effects on wine ==
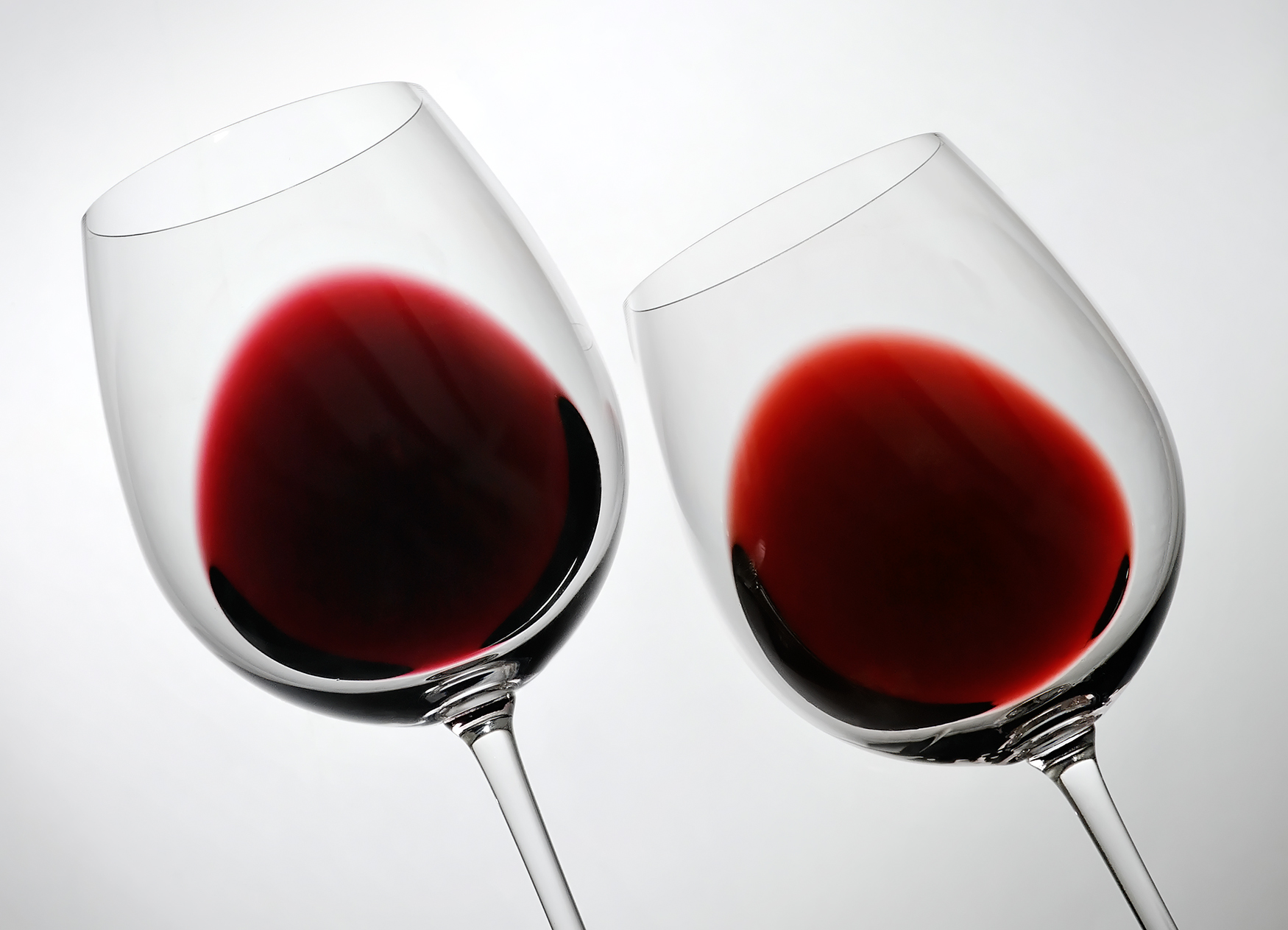
The effect of oak aging on two Penedès region Cabernet Sauvignon varietals, a two-year-old cosecha (left) and six-year-old crianza (right). As the wine matures, its color shifts from deep purple or crimson to a lighter brick-red, and takes on a more graduated appearance in the glass.

The porous nature of an oak barrel allows evaporation and oxygenation to occur in wine but typically not at levels that would cause oxidation or spoilage. The typical 59-gallon (225-liter) barrel can lose anywhere from 5 1/2 to 6 1/2 gallons (21 to 25 liters) (of mostly alcohol and water) in a year through evaporation. This allows the wine to concentrate its flavor and aroma compounds. Small amounts of oxygen are allowed to pass through the barrel and act as a softening agent upon the wine's tannins.

The chemical properties of oak can have a profound effect on wine. Phenols within the wood interact to produce vanilla type flavors and can give the impression of tea notes or sweetness. The degree of "toast" on the barrel can also impart different properties affecting the tannin levels as well as the aggressive wood flavors. The hydrolyzable tannins present in wood, known as ellagitannins, are derived from lignin structures in the wood. They help protect the wine from oxidation and reduction.

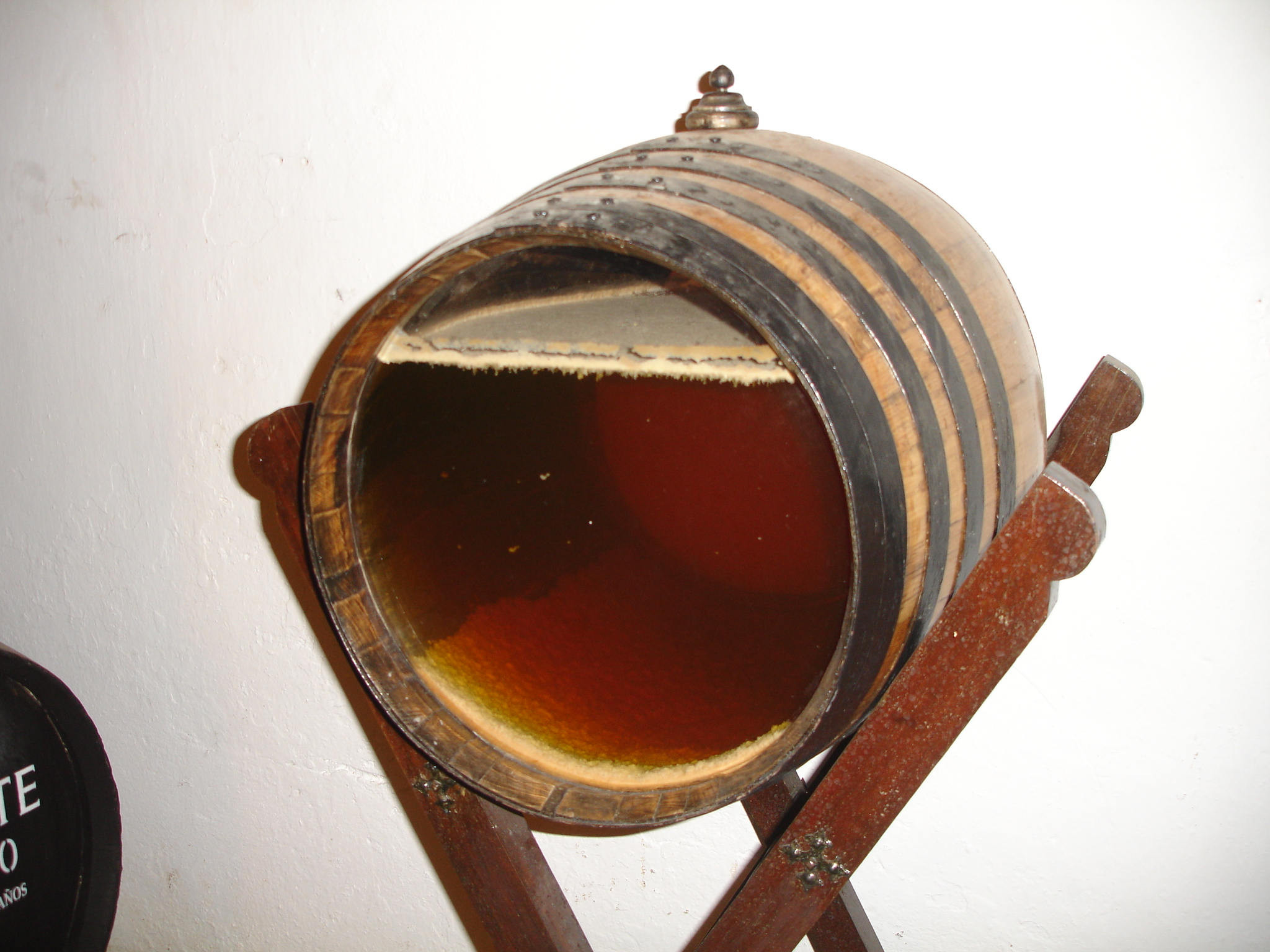
Oak barrel aging sherry. It has a transparent front in order to show the process inside

Characteristics of white wines fermented in oak include a pale color and extra silky texture. White wines fermented in steel and matured in oak will have a darker coloring due to heavy phenolic compounds still present. Flavor notes commonly used to describe wines exposed to oak include caramel, cream, smoke, spice and vanilla. Chardonnay is a varietal with very distinct flavor profiles when fermented in oak, which include coconut, cinnamon and cloves notes. The "toastiness" of the barrel can bring out varying degrees of mocha and toffee notes in red wine. It is a common misconception that oak imparts butter flavors to wine. The butter flavors come from lactic acid, naturally present in the wine, converted during malolactic fermentation to diacetyl. This process reverses itself, although the addition of sulfur dioxide prevents this, and the diacetyl remains.

Wines can be barrel fermented in oak or placed in oak after fermentation for a period of aging or maturation. Wine matured in oak receives more oak flavors and properties than wine fermented in oak because yeast cells present in fermentation interact with and "latch on" to oak components. When dead yeast cells are removed as lees some oak properties go with them.

The length of time a wine spends in the barrel is dependent on the varietal and finished style the winemaker desires. The majority of oak flavoring is imparted in the first few months the wine is in contact with oak, while longer term exposure adds light barrel aeration, which helps precipitate phenolic compounds and quickens the aging process. New World Pinot noir may spend less than a year in oak. Premium Cabernet Sauvignon may spend two years. The very tannic Nebbiolo grape may spend four or more years in oak. High end Rioja producers will sometimes age their wines up to ten years in American oak to get a desired earthy cedar and herbal character.

== Oak types and sources ==
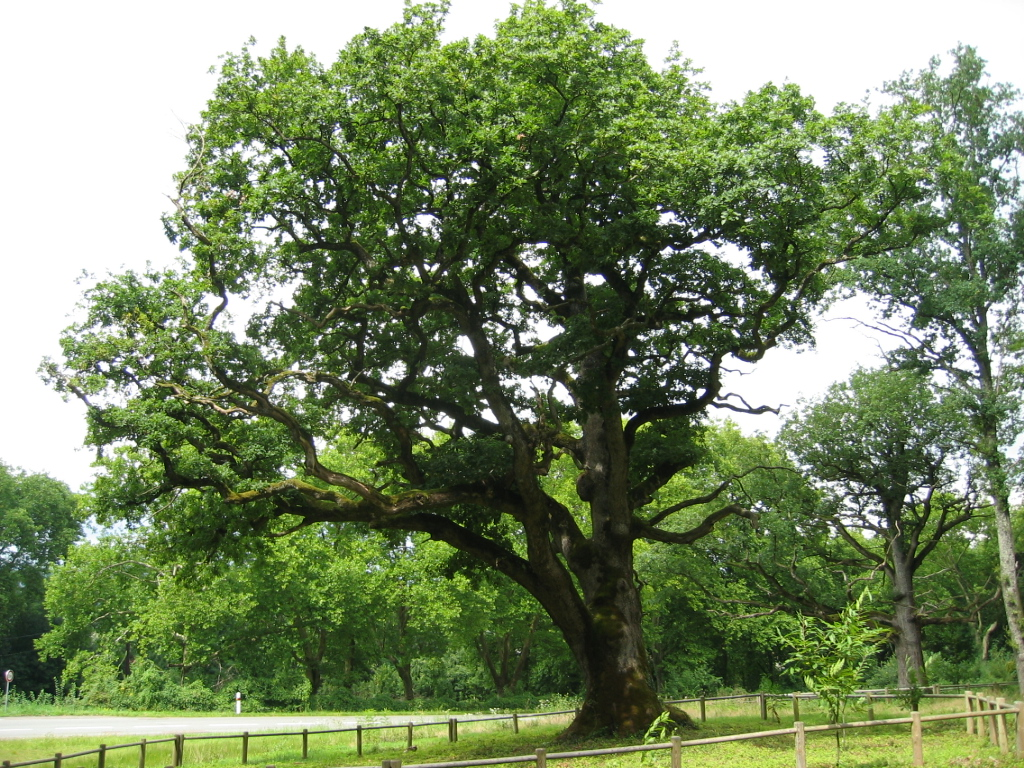
The Quercus petraea tree responsible for French oak.

The species of oak typically used for American oak production is the Quercus alba which is a white oak species that is characterized by its relatively fast growth, wider grains and lower wood tannins. It is found in most of the Eastern United States as well as Missouri, Minnesota and Wisconsin where many wine barrels are from. In Oregon the Quercus garryana white oak has started to gain usage due to its closer similarities to European oak.

In France, both the Quercus robur (English oak) and Quercus petraea (sessile oak) are considered apt for wine making; however, the latter is considered far superior for its finer grain and richer contribution of aromatic components like vanillin and its derivates, methyl-octalactone and tannins, as well as phenols and volatile aldehydes. French oak typically comes from one or more primary forests: Allier, Limousin, Nevers, Tronçais and Vosges. The wood from each of these forests has slightly different characteristics. Many winemakers utilize barrels made from different cooperages, regions and degrees of toasting in blending their wines to enhance the complexity of the resulting wine.

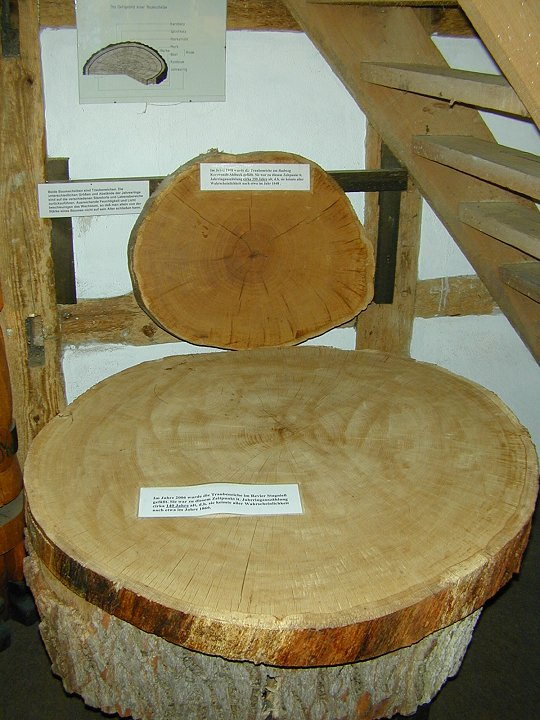
The tighter grain of French oak allows for a more gradual integration of flavors in the wine.

Italian winemakers have had a long history of using Slavonian oak from the Quercus robur which is known for its tight grain, low aromatics and medium level tannins. Slavonian oak tends to be used in larger barrel sizes (with less surface area relative to volume) with the same barrels reused for many more years before replacement. Prior to the Russian Revolution, Quercus petraea oak from Hungary was the most highly sought after wood for French winemaking. The trees in the Hungarian Zemplén Mountains grow more slowly and smaller in the volcanic soil, creating fine tight grain which sequentially lends itself to a very delicate extraction.

The hemicellulose in the Hungarian oak breaks down more easily, and conveys toasted, vanilla, sugary, woody, spicy and caramel-like flavors and imparts these aromas with less intensity, and more slowly than American or French oak.

Many winemakers favor the softer, smoother, creamier texture that Hungarian oak offers their wines. French winemakers preferred to use Hungarian barrels until the early 20th century, then, because of The World Wars and supply cuts, the French wine industry was forced to find its own source in France, similar to the unique quality, legendary Hungarian Zemplén oak.

However, after the fall of the Iron Curtain, the cooperages from France again became major consumers of the exclusive Quercus petraea/Sessile Hungarian Oak trees originating in the Zemplén Mountain Forest.

The Russian oak from the Adygey region along the Black Sea is being explored by French winemakers as a cheaper alternative to French and Hungarian oak. Canadian wineries have been experimenting with the use of Canadian oak, which proponents describe as a middle ground between American and French oak even though it is the same species as American oak.

Oak trees are typically between 80–120 years old prior to harvesting with the ideal conditions being a cool climate in a dense forest region that gives the trees opportunity to mature slowly and develop a tighter grain. Typically one tree can provide enough wood for two 225-litre (59 US gal) barrels. The trees are typically harvested in the winter months when there is less sap in the trunk.

=== Differences between French and American oak ===
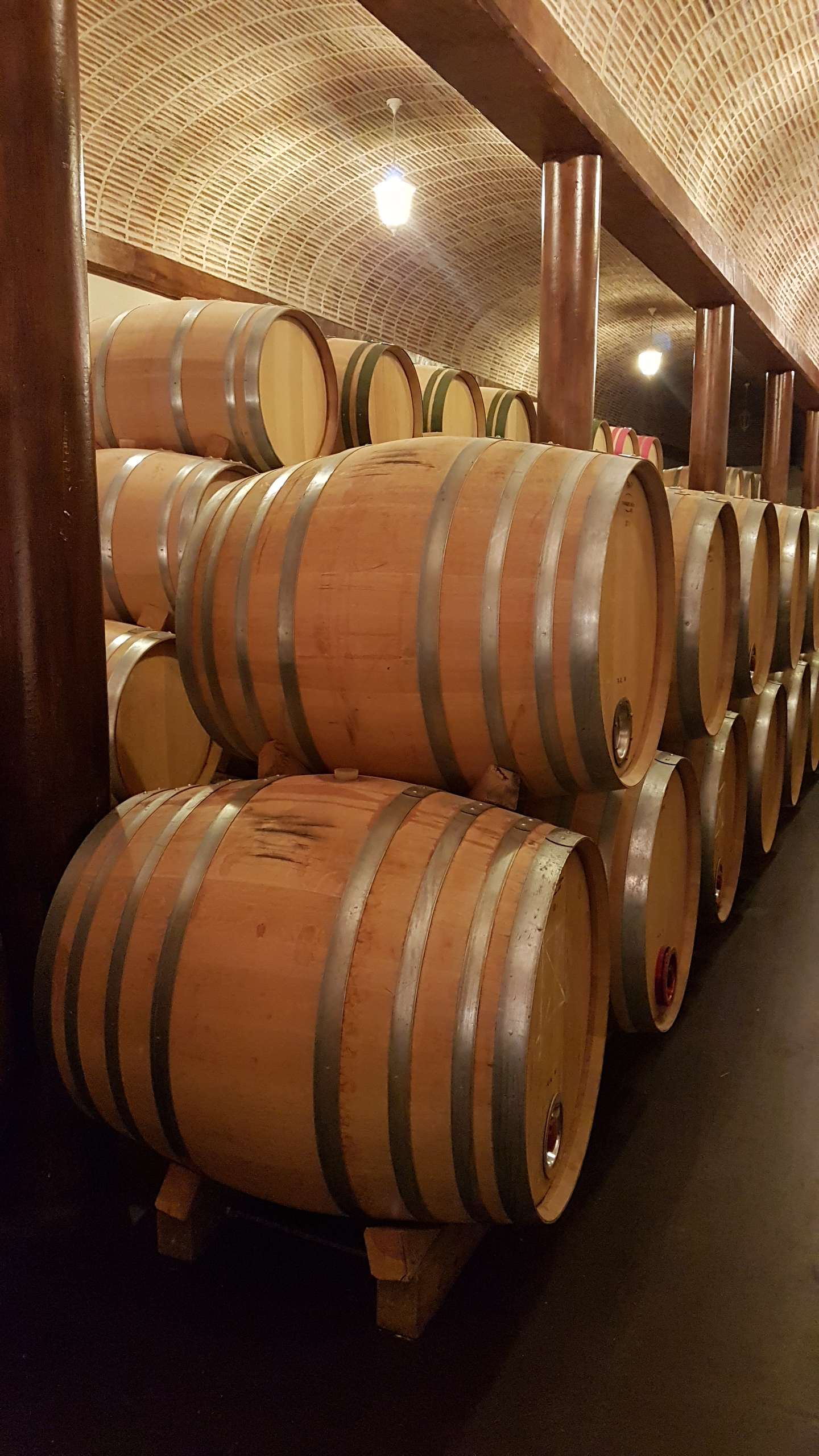
500 litre French oak wine barrels in Bodegas Casajús, in Ribera del Duero

American oak tends to be more intensely flavored than French oak with more sweet and vanilla overtones due to the American oak having two to four times as many lactones. Winemakers choose American oak typically for bold, powerful reds, base wines for "assemblage", or for warm climate Chardonnays. Besides being derived from different species, a major difference between American and French oak comes from the preparation of the wood. The tighter grain and less watertight nature of French oak obliges coopers to split the wood along the grain. The wood is then aged or "seasoned" for 24 to 36 months in the open air, in a so-called wood-yard.

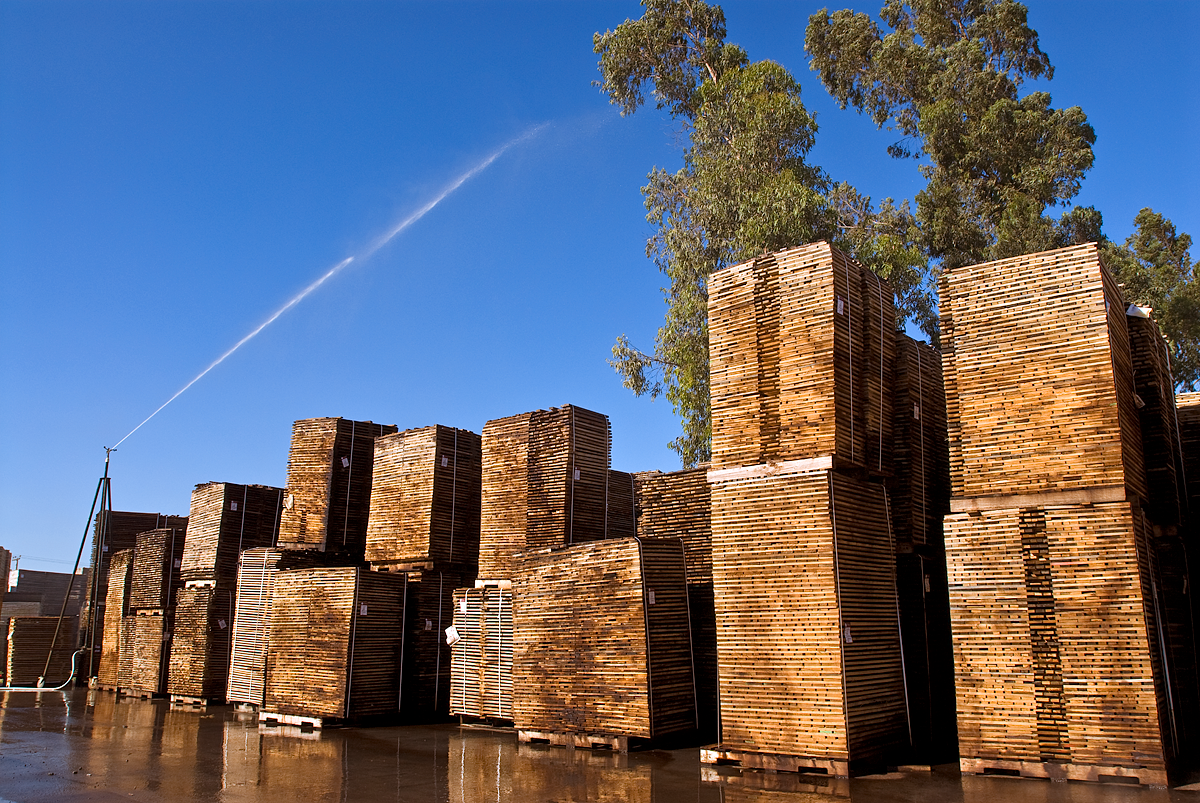
Oak seasoning at the Tonelería Nacional wood yard

Even though American coopers may use a kiln-dry method to season the wood, almost all others will season American oak in exactly the same way as French. Open air seasoning has the advantage of leaching undesirable chemical components and bitter tannins, mellowing the oak in a manner that kiln-dry methods are incapable of replicating. Even though sun, rain, and wind may suffice in most cases to season oak, in drier climates coopers - such as Tonelería Nacional - apply up to 2000 mm (80 in) of water a year to their wood stacks in order to facilitate the seasoning process.

Since French oak must be split, only 20 to 25% of the tree can be utilized; American oak may be sawn, which makes it at least twice as economical. Its more pronounced oxidation and a quicker release of aromas helps wines to lose their astringency and harshness more quickly, which makes this the wood of choice for shorter maturations, about six to ten months.

French oak, on the other hand, generates silky and transparent tannins, which transmit a sensation of light sweetness combined with fruity flavors that persist in the mouth. Spices and toasted almond are noteworthy, combined with flavors of ripe red fruit in red wines, and notes of peach, exotic fruits and floral aromas like jasmine and rose in whites, depending on the grape variety employed.

== Wine barrel ==
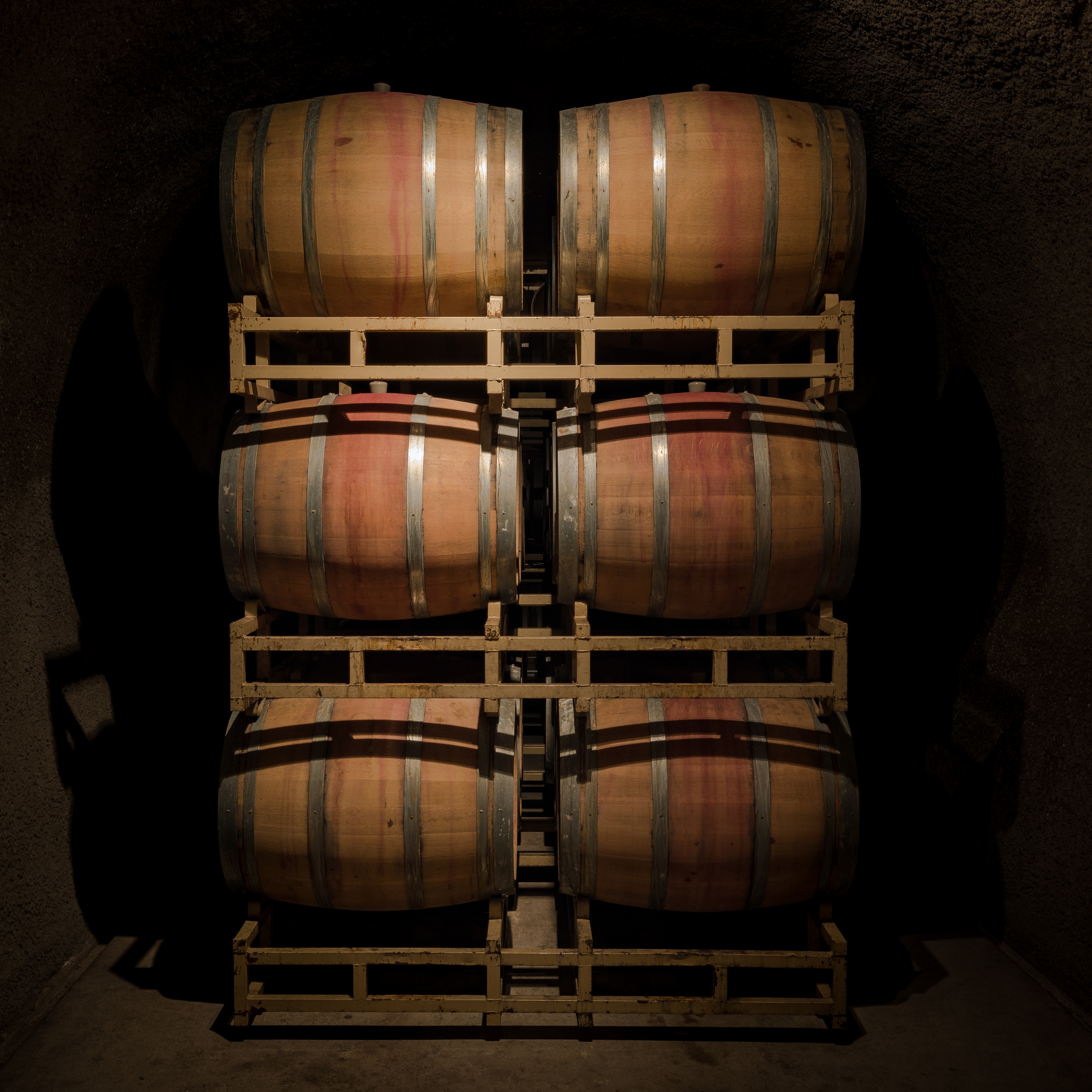
The "red band" on some wine barrels is the residue of spilt red wine. For aesthetics some wineries will paint this center portion of the barrel red for a cleaner look. Rutherford Hill Winery, Napa Valley AVA.

Wine barrels, especially those made of oak, have long been used as containers in which wine is aged. Aging in oak typically imparts desirable vanilla and spice flavors to wine. The size of the barrel plays a large role in determining the effects of oak on the wine by dictating the ratio of surface area to volume of wine with smaller containers having a larger impact. The most common barrels are the Bordeaux style barrel, which holds 225 litres (59 US gal), followed by the Burgundy style barrel, which holds 228 litres (60 US gal). Some New World winemakers are now also using the larger hogshead 300-litre (79 US gal) barrel. Larger barrels are also traditionally used in parts of Italy such as Barolo, as well as the south of France.

New barrels impart more flavors than do previously used barrels. Over time many of the oak properties get "leached" out of the barrel with layers of natural deposits left from the wine building up on the wood to where after 3 to 5 vintages there may be little or no oak flavors imparted on the wine. In addition, oxygen transport through the oak and into the wine, which is required for maturation, becomes severely limited after 3–5 years. The cost of barrels varies due to the supply and demand market economy and can change with different features that a cooperage may offer. As of late 2007 the price for a standard American oak barrel was US$600 to 800, French oak US$1200 and up, and Eastern European US$600. Due to the expense of barrels, several techniques have been devised in an attempt to save money. One is to shave the inside of used barrels and insert new thin inner staves that have been toasted.

=== Barrel construction ===
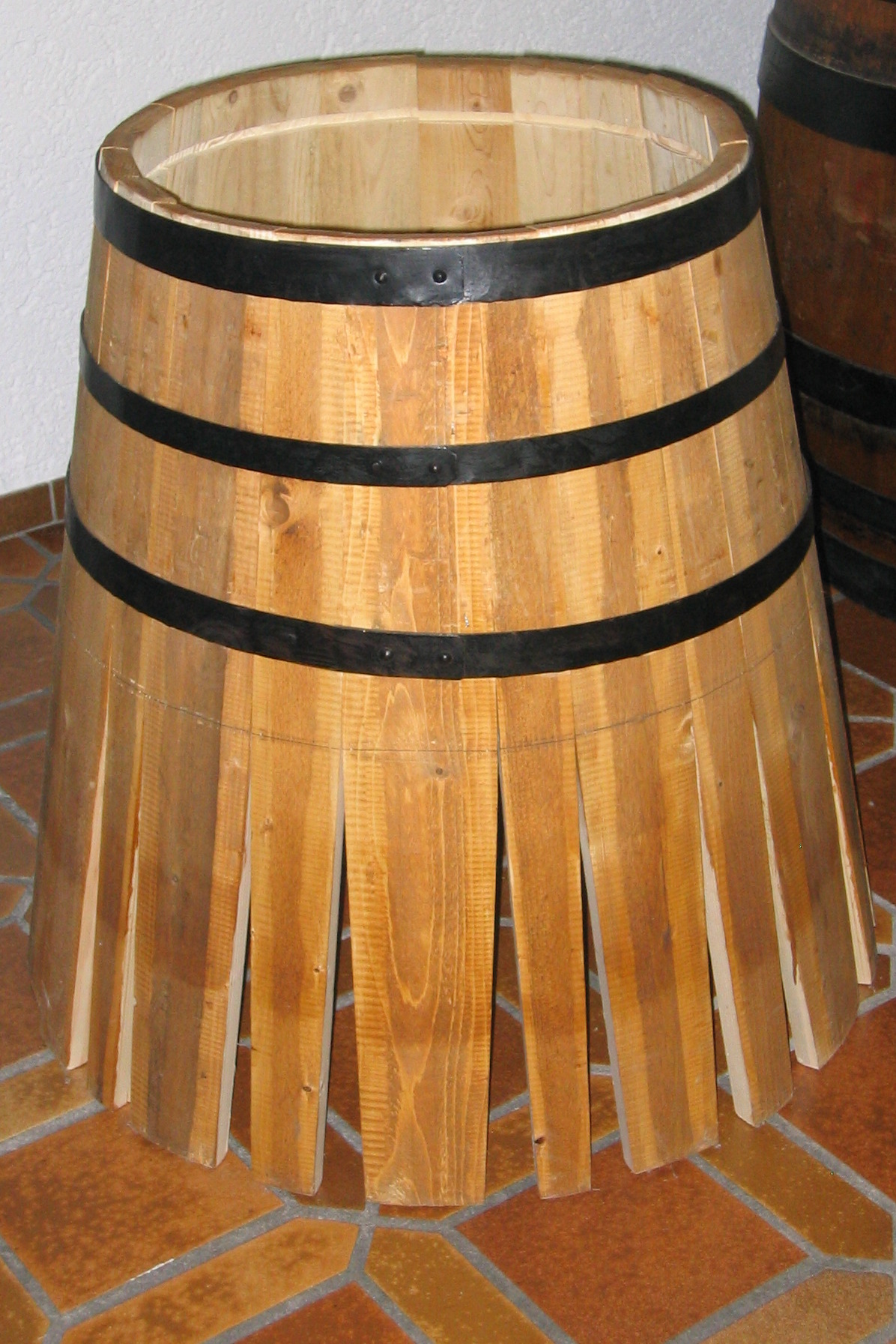
Barrel midway through construction.

Barrels are constructed in cooperages. The traditional method of European coopers has been to hand-split the oak into staves (or strips) along the grain. After the oak is split, it is allowed to "season" or dry outdoors while exposed to the elements. This process can take anywhere from 10 to 36 months during which time the harshest tannins from the wood are leached out. These tannins are visible as dark gray and black residue left on the ground once the staves are removed. The longer the wood is allowed to season the softer the potential wine stored in the barrels may be but this can add substantially to the cost of the barrel. In some American cooperage the wood is dried in a kiln instead of outdoor seasoning. While this method is much faster, it does not soften the tannins quite as much as outdoor seasoning.

The staves are then heated, traditionally over an open fire, and, when pliable, are bent into the desired shape of the barrel and held together with iron rings. Instead of fire, a cooper may use steam to heat up the staves but this tends to impart less "toastiness" and complexity to the resulting wine. Following the traditional, hand worked style, a cooper is typically able to construct one barrel in a day's time. Winemakers can order barrels with the wood on the inside of the barrel having been lightly charred or toasted with fire, medium toasted, or heavily toasted. Typically the "lighter" the toasting the more oak flavor and tannins that are imparted. Heavy toast or "charred" which is typical treatment of barrels in Burgundy wine have an added dimension from the char that medium or light toasted barrels do not impart. Heavy toasting dramatically reduces the coconut note lactones, even in American oak, but create a high carbon content that may reduce the coloring of some wines. During the process of toasting, the furanic aldehydes in the wood reach a higher level of concentration. This produces the "roasted" aroma in the wine. The toasting also enhances the presences of vanillin and the phenol eugenol which creates smokey and spicy notes that in some wines are similar to the aromatics of oil of cloves.

== Barrel alternatives ==
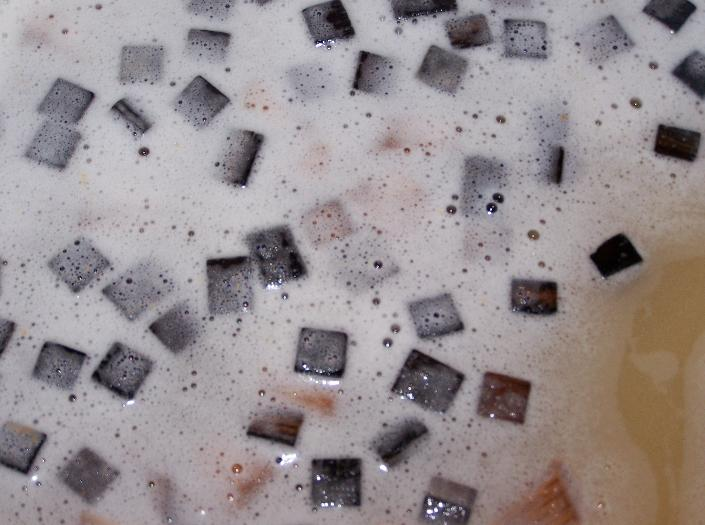
Oak chips in fermenting Chardonnay.

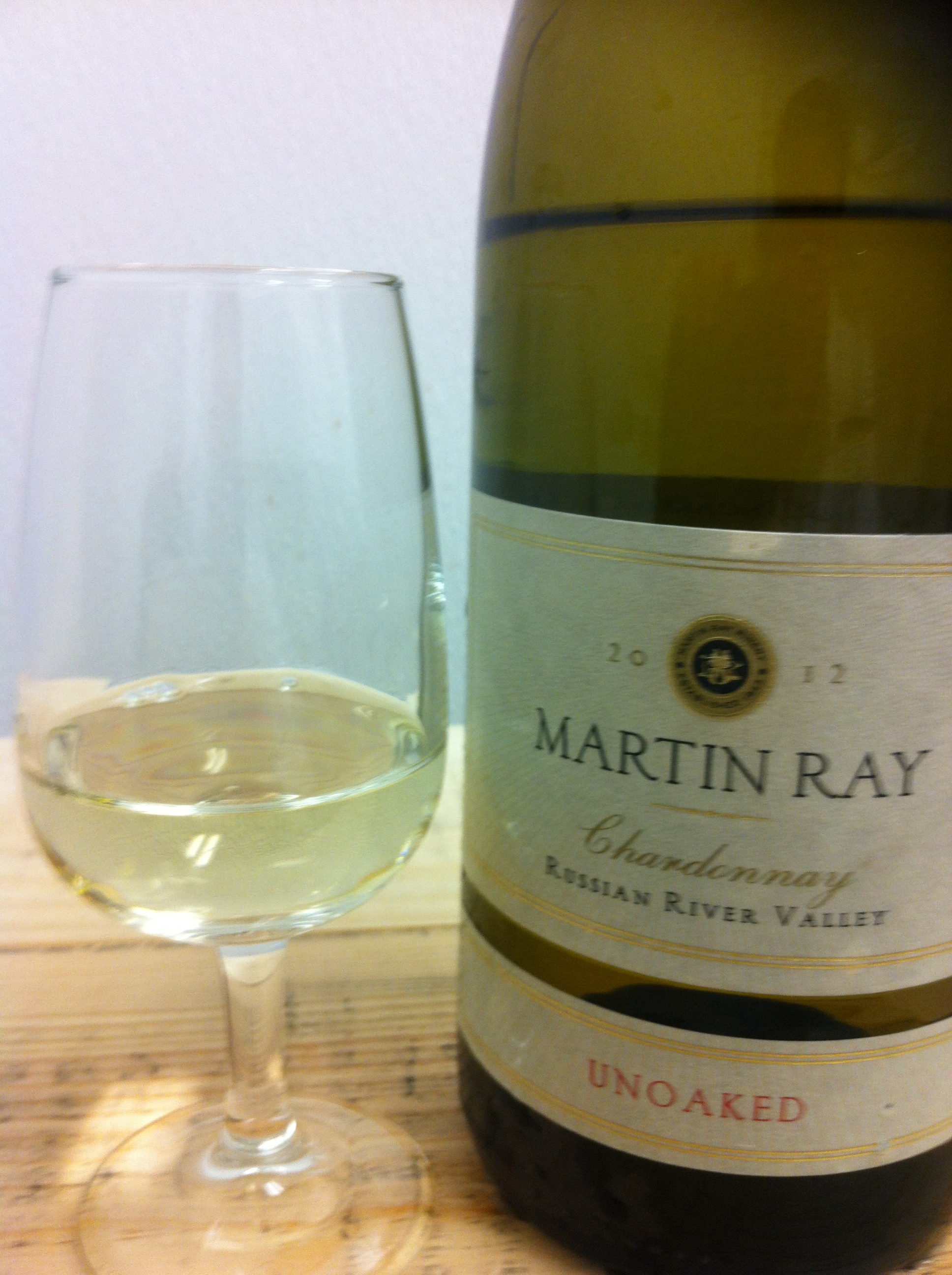
A Chardonnay from the Russian River Valley labeling itself as "unoaked" to differentiate itself from other oak-influenced Chardonnays.

Although oak barrels have long been used by winemakers, many wineries now use oak wood chips for aging wine more quickly and also adding desired woody aromas along with vanilla flavors. Oak chips can be added during fermentation or during aging. In the latter case, they are generally placed into fabric sacks and placed into the aging wine. The diversity of chips available gives winemakers numerous options. Oak chips have the benefit of imparting intense oak flavoring in a matter of weeks while traditional oak barrels would need a year or more to convey similar intensity. Critics claim that the oak flavoring from chips tend to be one-dimensional and skewed towards the vanilla extract with the wines still lacking some of the physical benefits that barrel oak imparts. The use of oak powder is also less common than chips, although they are a very practical alternative if oak character is to be introduced during fermentation. Oak planks or staves are sometimes used, either during fermentation or aging. Wines made from these barrel alternatives typically do not age as well as wines that are matured in barrels. Improvements in micro-oxygenation have allowed winemakers to better mimic the gentle aeration of oak barrels in stainless steel tanks with oak chips.

Prior to 2006, the practice of using oak chips was outlawed in the European Union. In 1999, the Bordeaux court of appeals fined four wineries, including third growth Chateau Giscours, over $13,000 USD for the use of oak chips in their wine.

== Other wood types ==
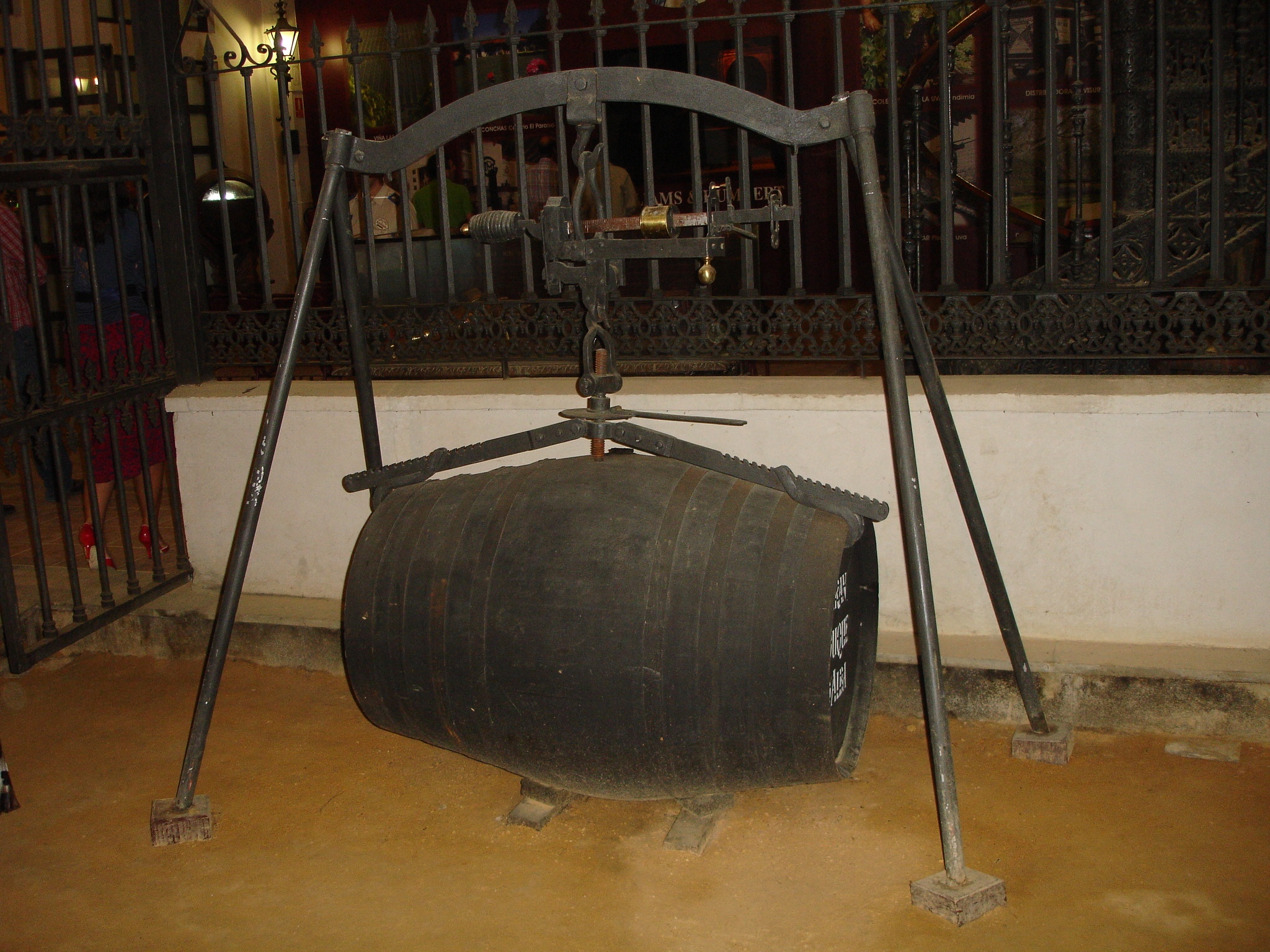
Weighing a sherry barrel

Throughout history other wood types, including chestnut, pine, redwood, and black locust, have been used in crafting winemaking vessels, particularly large fermentation vats. However, none of these wood types possess the compatibility with wine that oak has demonstrated in combining its watertight, yet slightly porous, storage capabilities with the unique flavor and texture characteristic that it can impart to the wine that it is in contact with. Chestnut is very high in tannins and is too porous as a storage barrel and must be coated with paraffin to prevent excessive wine loss through evaporation. Redwood is too rigid to bend into the smaller barrel shapes and imparts an unpleasant flavor. Black Locust imparts a yellow tint to the wine. Other hardwoods like apple and cherry wood have an off-putting smell. Austrian winemakers have a history of using black locust barrels. Historically, chestnut was used by Beaujolais, Italian and Portuguese wine makers. Some Rhône winemakers still use paraffin-coated chestnut barrels but the coating minimizes any effect from the wood making its function, similar to a neutral concrete vessel. In Chile there are traditions for using barrels made of rauli wood but it is beginning to fall out of favor due to the musky scent it imparts on wine.

== See also ==
- Barrel
- Clarification and stabilization of wine
- Ullage (wine)
