= Pierre Tari =

Pierre Tari was owner of Château Giscours and from 1975 to 1989 President of the Union des Grands Crus de Bordeaux, the organization of the wine classified in the Bordeaux Wine Official Classification of 1855. He served as an expert taster in the historic Judgment of Paris wine competition.

== See also ==
- List of wine personalities
