= Quintana del Pidio =

Coordinates: 41°45′N 3°45′W

- Municipality and town
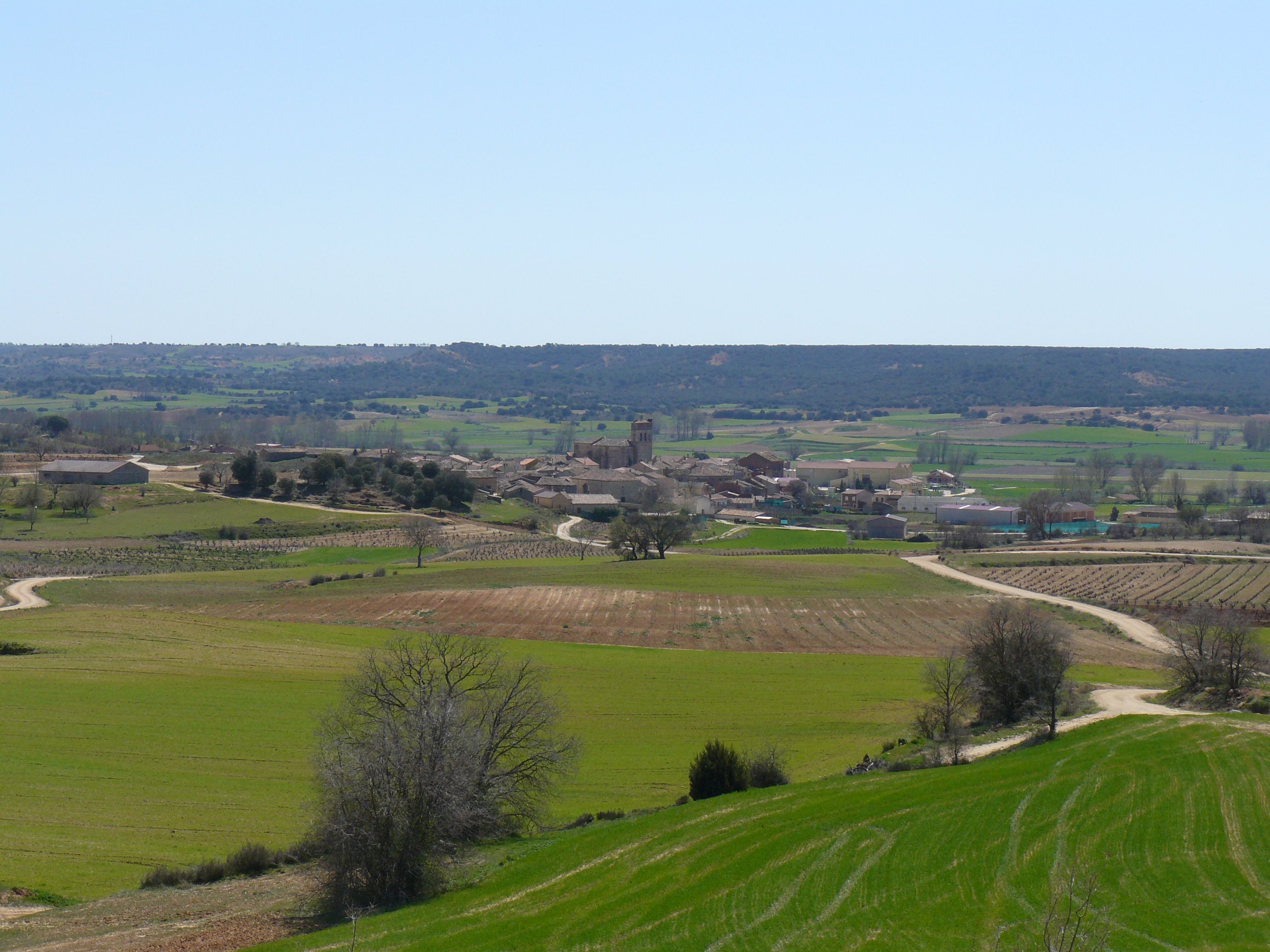
- View of Quintana del Pidio, 2013

- Coat of arms
- Interactive map of Quintana del Pidio
- Country: Spain
- Autonomous community: Castile and León
- Province: Burgos
- Comarca: Ribera del Duero

Area
  - Total: 10.74 km^{2} (4.15 sq mi)
- Elevation: 845 m (2,772 ft)

Population (2025-01-01)
  - Total: 150
  - Density: 14/km^{2} (36/sq mi)
- Time zone: UTC+1 (CET)
  - Summer (DST): UTC+2 (CEST)
- Postal code: 09443
- Website: http://www.quintanadelpidio.es/

Quintana del Pidio is a municipality and town located in the province of Burgos, Castile and León, Spain. According to the 2004 census (INE), the municipality has a population of 180 inhabitants.

== Economy ==
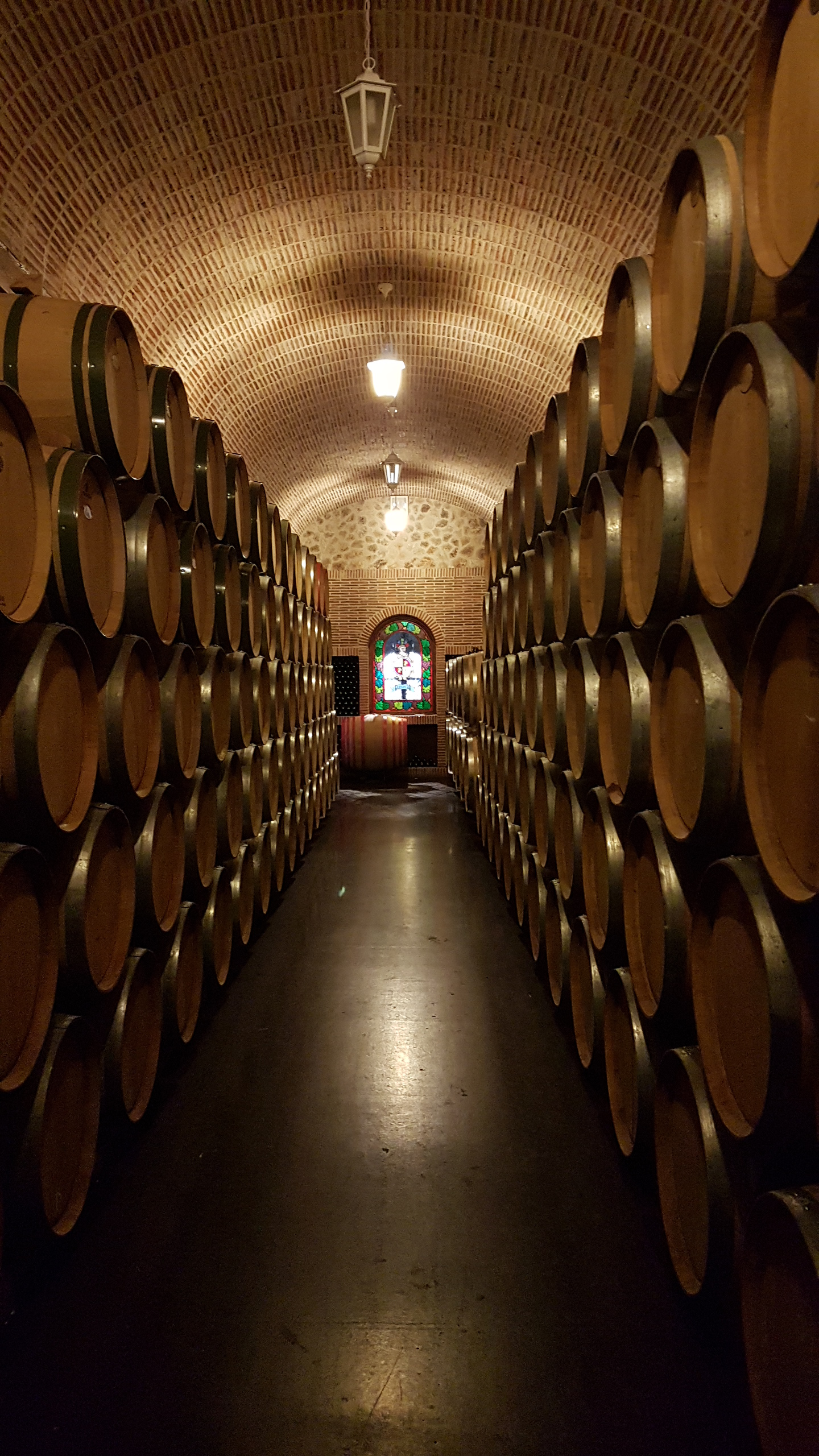
Wine barrels in Casajús winery, in Quintana del Pidio.

The core business of the locality is fundamentally agricultural, particularly wine growing, with important wineries, grain and livestock, especially ovine. It has the following 8 wineries:

- Bodegas Casajús.
- Cillar de Silos
- Cooperativa Nuestra Señora de los Olmos
- Pagos de Quintana
- Marqués de Valparaíso
- Valle de Monzón
- Prado de Olmedo
- Alto Miraltares

== People from Quintana del Pidio ==
- Ciriaco María Sancha y Hervás (1833–1909) - Cardinal of the Roman Catholic Church, who served as Archbishop of Toledo, Primate of Spain and Patriarch of the West Indies.
