= Château Giscours =

Winery in Bordeaux, France

Coordinates: 45.00870°N 0.64605°W

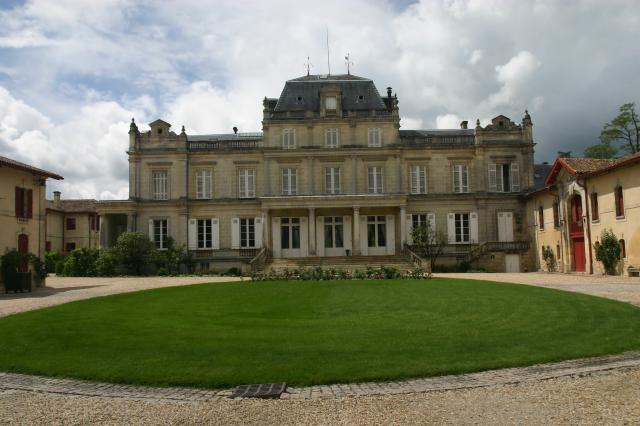
Château Giscours, in the French town of Labarde, near Margaux

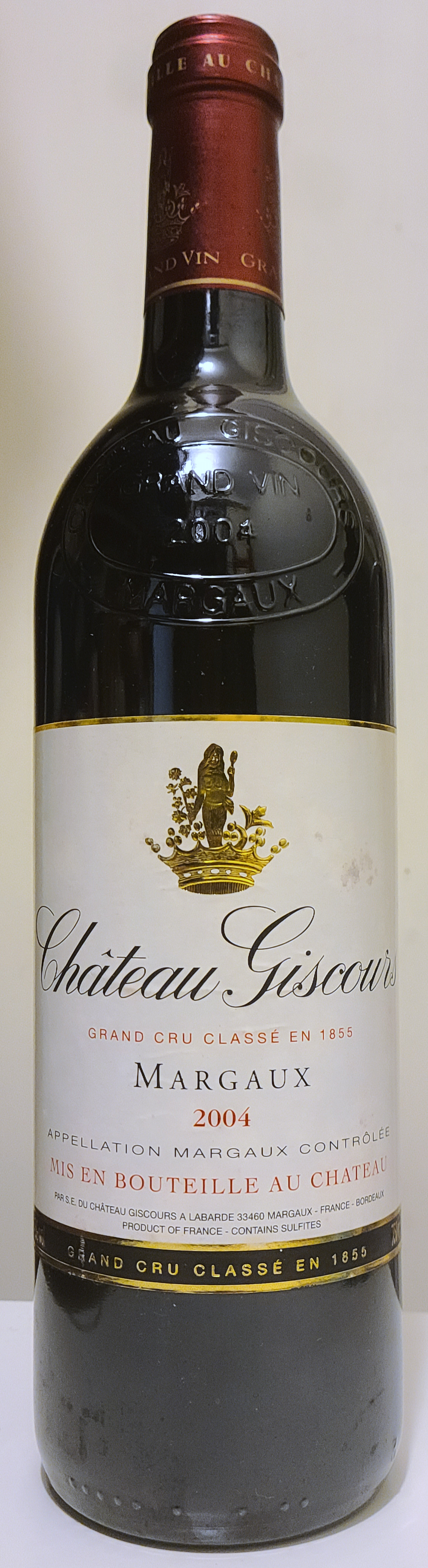
Grand Vin 2004

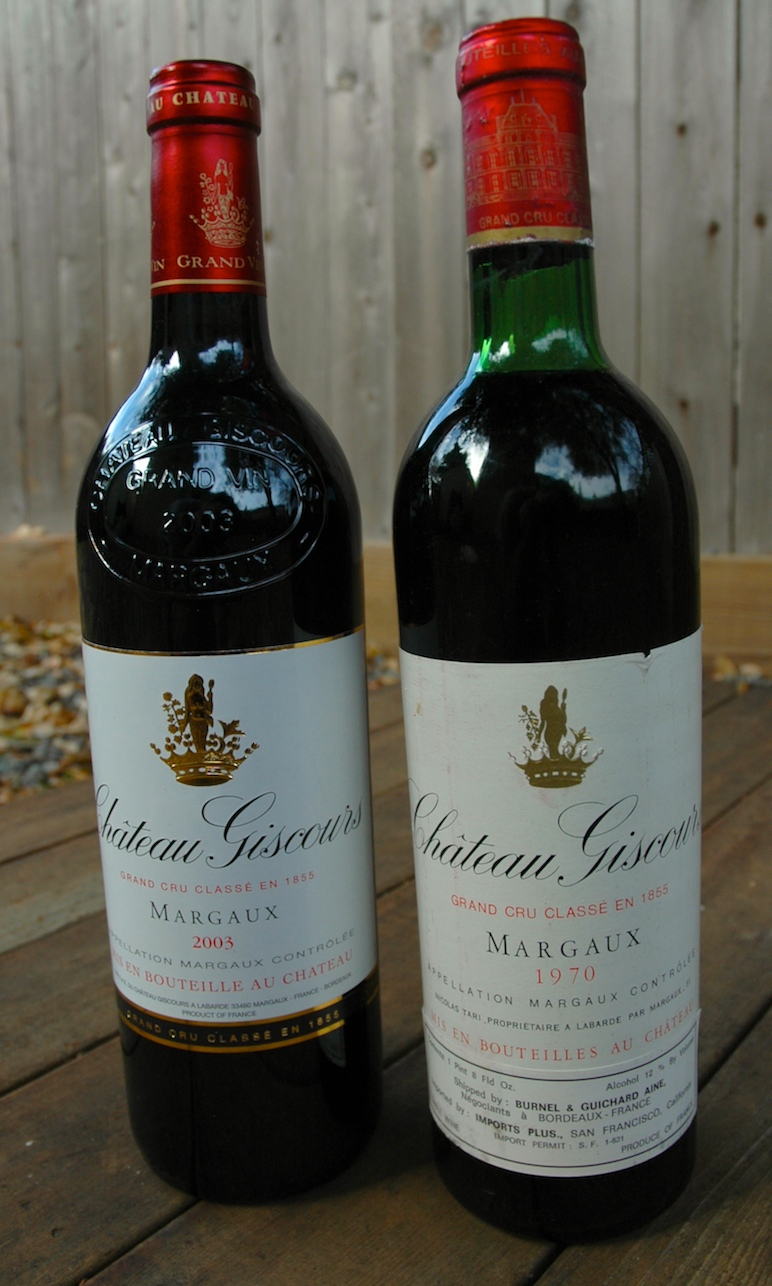
Two vintages of Château Giscours, 1970 and 2003

Château Giscours is a winery in the Margaux appellation of the Bordeaux region of France. The wine produced here was classified as one of fourteen Troisièmes Crus (Third Growths) in the Bordeaux Wine Official Classification of 1855.

== History ==
The first written reference to the domain of Giscours, a deed confirming the sale of the estate, dates from 1330 and refers to a fortified keep. Records of Giscours' vineyards go back to 1552 when Seigneur de la Bastide sold it to Pierre de l'Horme. Prior to the French Revolution Giscours belonged to the Saint-Simon family before it was confiscated from Claude-Anne de Rouvroy de Saint Simon, and then bought by two Americans in 1793, John Gray and Jonathan Davis of Boston.

Several owners followed, and Giscours' great era began with the purchase of the property by the banker Count de Pescatore in 1845, who in 1847 hired Pierre Skawinski to manage his estate. Skawinski proved to be one of the great agriculturalists of Médoc in the 19th century, in 1860 the inventor of a plough which bears his name, and a pioneer in the fight against mildew, he was instrumental in making Giscours one of the most reputable third growths. Skawinski managed the estate for 50 years, also during the following ownership by the Cruse family, the estate's most successful period. The family sold Giscours in 1913, and many difficult years followed.

In 1954 the estate was purchased by Nicolas Tari, formerly a large-scale winemaker in Algeria, who restored and enlarged the property, making it one of the most productive estates in the Médoc.

In 1976, the then-owner of the château and President of the Union des Grands Crus de Bordeaux, Pierre Tari, was selected as one of 11 judges to take part in the "Judgment of Paris" wine competition.

In 1995, Château Giscours' wine growing business activities were acquired by Eric Albada Jelgersma.

== Production ==
From an estate of nearly 400 hectares, the Giscours planted vineyard area extends 80 hectares spread out over several plots. The composition of grape varieties is 53% Cabernet Sauvignon, 42% Merlot and the remainder Cabernet Franc and Petit Verdot.

Of the Grand vin Chateau Giscours there is annually produced 25,000 cases, and of the second wine La Sirène de Giscours there is typically produced 10,000 cases.

A 40 hectare plot of vines adjacent to Giscours outside the Margaux boundary is bottled as Le Haut Médoc de Giscours. Other wines produced by the estate include Château Dutheil and Château Houringe, both Haut-Médoc cru bourgeois properties, the former is vinified at Giscours, the latter is since 1982 operated on a lease.

== Cricket ==
Château Giscours is the home ground of the Bordeaux Giscours Cricket Club, participants in the Aquitaine Division of the French National League and current National Champions.
