= Greenway of the Sierra de la Demanda =

Coordinates: 42°19′11″N 3°27′29″W

Vía verde de la Sierra de la Demanda
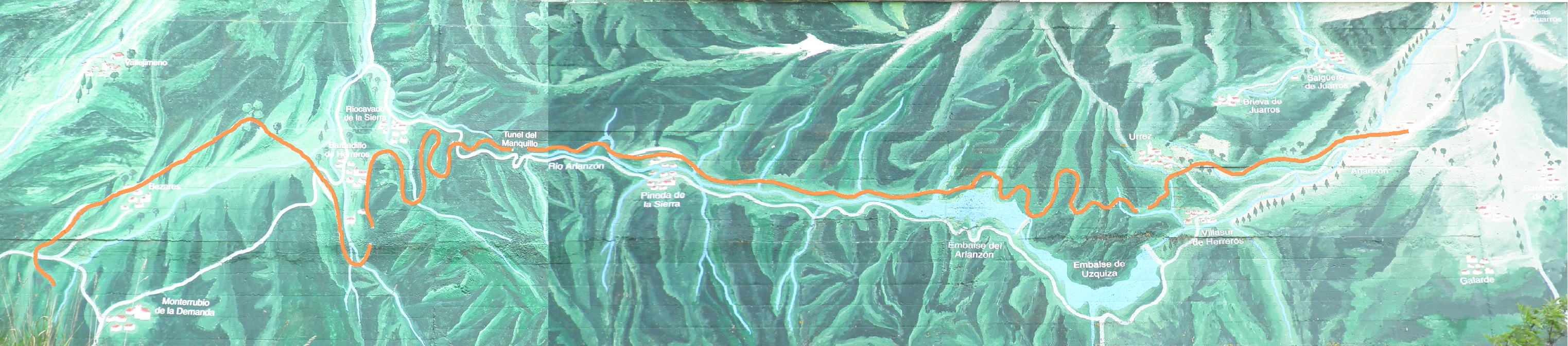
- Mural map showing the rail trail (highlighted in orange) in Arlanzón, Burgos
- Length: 54 km (34 mi)
- Location: Burgos province, Spain
- Trailheads: Arlanzón; Monterrubio de la Demanda
- Use: Hiking, Cycling, Jogging, Horse riding
- Elevation change: 693 m (2,274 ft)
- Highest point: 1,412 m (4,633 ft)
- Lowest point: 967 m (3,173 ft)
- Difficulty: Moderate
- Season: All
- Sights: Archaeological Site of Atapuerca, Arlanzón River, Pineda de la Sierra, Barbadillo de Herreros finery forge, Sierra de la Demanda
- Surface: Compact gravel
- Website: www.viasverdes.com

The Vía verde de la Sierra de la Demanda is a greenway in the province of Burgos, Spain. It takes its name from a mountain sub-range, the Sierra de la Demanda. The route extends over most of the path of a short-lived mining railway of the early 20th century. The railway carried minerals from the mines of Monterrubio de la Demanda and Barbadillo de Herreros to Villafría, in the outskirts of Burgos, where it connected with the main line.

== Location ==
Nowadays, the rail trail runs between Arlanzón (where the only station of the line was located) and Monterrubio. The possibility of extending the route from Arlanzón to the Archaeological site of Atapuerca has been considered. This site, which was uncovered by the construction of the railway, was given World Heritage Site status in 2000.

== History ==
In 1896 the British company "The Sierra Company Limited" got permission from the Spanish government to build a narrow gauge railway to transport iron from the mines of the Sierra de la Demanda to Burgos, and once there to the Basque steel mills through the Burgos-Bilbao railway line. In 1901 the line was opened. Shortly after, a license to transport passengers was granted, but the company only performed freight services. Nevertheless, the line remained loss-making due to high operating costs to Bilbao, and was closed in 1910. In 1947 the line was dismantled and fell into disrepair. Earlier this century, the idea of converting part of the railway line into a greenway for walkers and cyclists came into reality, being finally opened in 2004.

== Description ==
Throughout the path's 54 km a great variety of flora and fauna can be found including birds of prey, squirrels, foxes, deer and wild boar. Leaving Arlanzón, the route runs between stands of pine and ash, until it enters a dense forest of oak on the way to the Arlanzón reservoir. At 10 km is the first tunnel (near the town of Urrez), which is closed as the ceiling has fallen. A parallel steep track avoids the obstacle. A few km later we will reach the dam, where there are several rest areas.

At 23 km is Pineda de la Sierra, declared a historic-artistic complex with mountain-style architecture houses and a Romanesque church with portico. Until recently, the greenway stopped here, and trail users had to go by the road for a while, as the trail had been occupied by an individual who claimed possession. In 2009, the Supreme Court found in favour of the Pineda de la Sierra town hall in their dispute with the landholder. The route continues parallel to the River Arlanzón, and sandwiched between the mounts Mencilla and San Millán.

At 31 km the Manquillo tunnel appears, through which the train avoided the mountain passof the same name. Nowadays, the tunnel is closed because of its poor maintenance condition, and the route follows a very steep hill to avoid the pass. Once over the summit, the way descends between closed curves and beech forests.

At 40 km is the last tunnel on the way, and the only one open. From here, a dirt track connects the greenway with Riocavado de la Sierra. At 44 km is Barbadillo de Herreros, a village with a mining past, where we can visit a furnace and other remnants of the old ironworks. The greenway follows a zig-zag route by a pyrenean oak forest up to the former village of Bezares (today a dairy farm), and quickly leads to 52 km (end of the original railway line), where there is a recreation area ("La Pradera") with a hut, water source and grills. By continuing a couple of miles further on paved trail Monterrubio de la Demanda is reached at the end of the route.

== Gallery ==
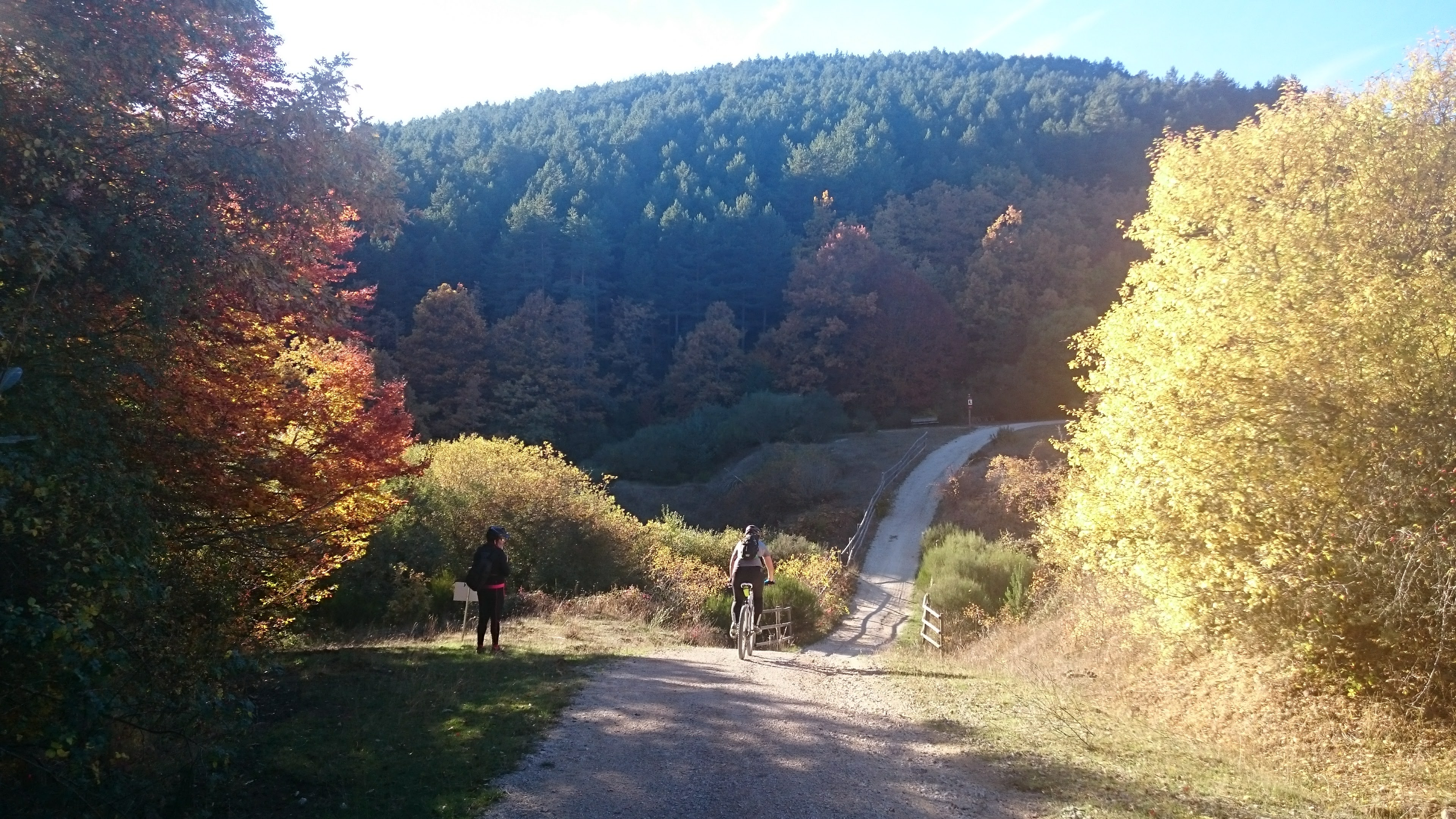
The Greenway at autumn.

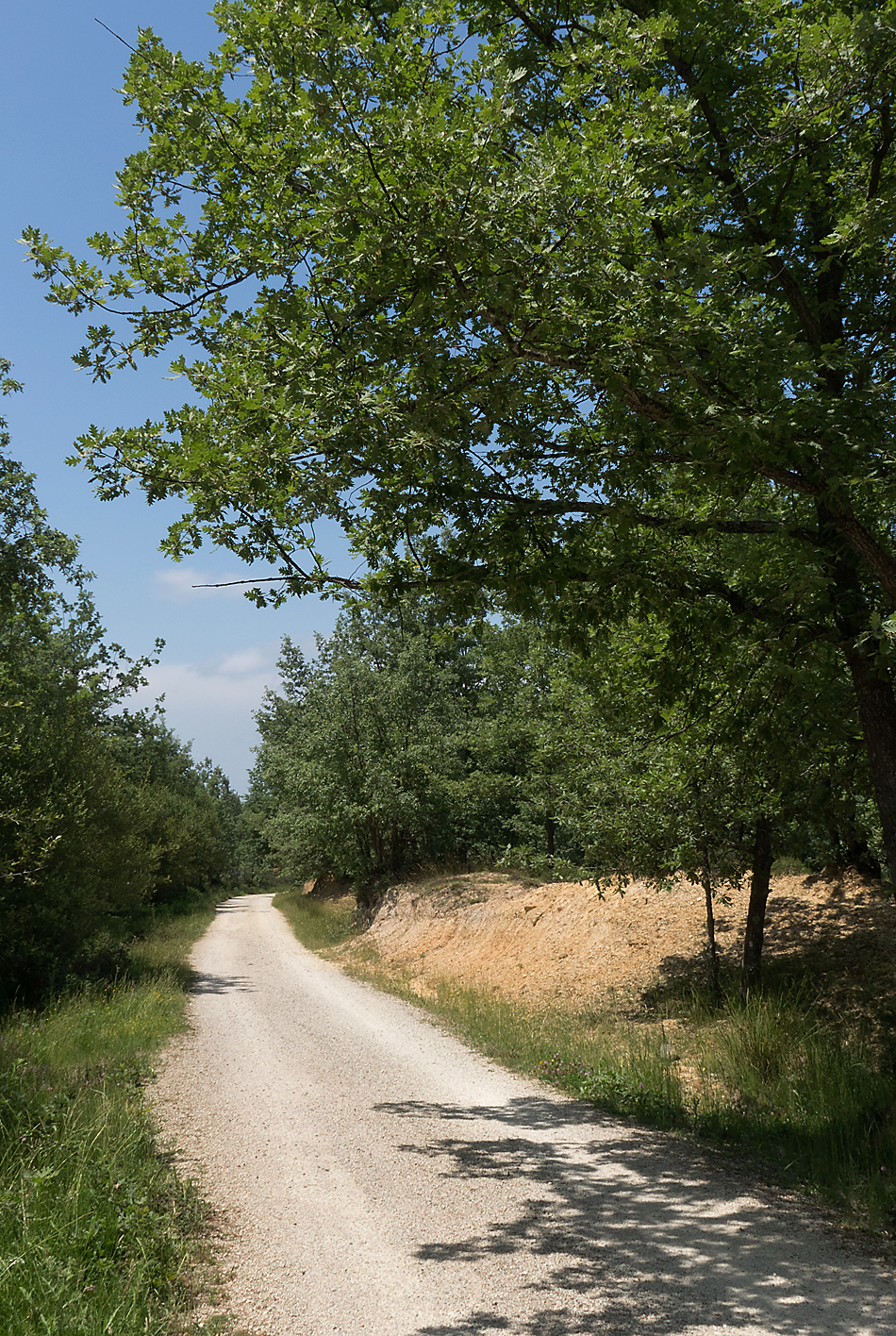
The Greenway at summer.

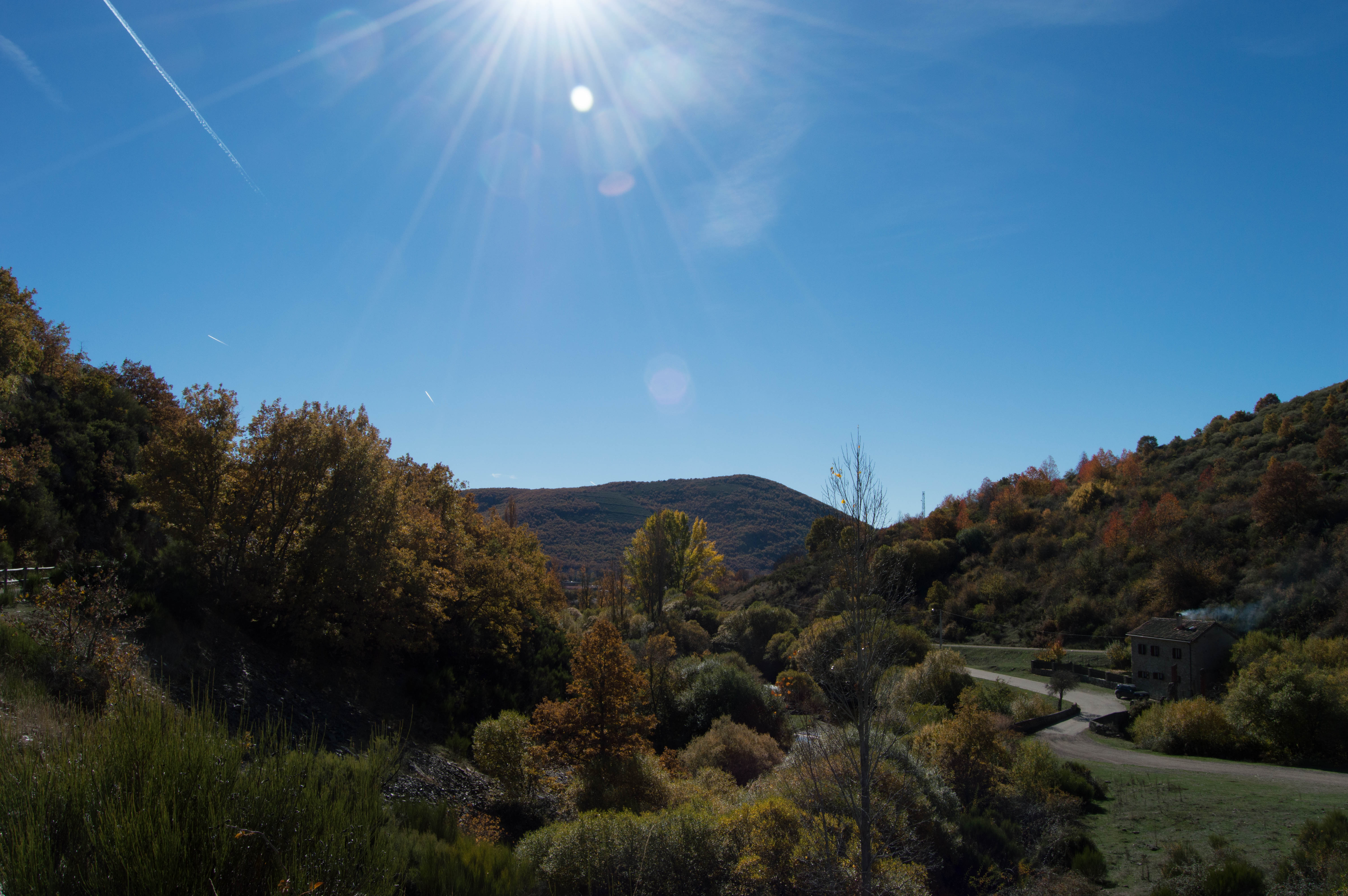
The Greenway near by Barbadillo de Herreros.
