= Pico San Millán =

Mountain in Spain

- El Torruco; Torruco
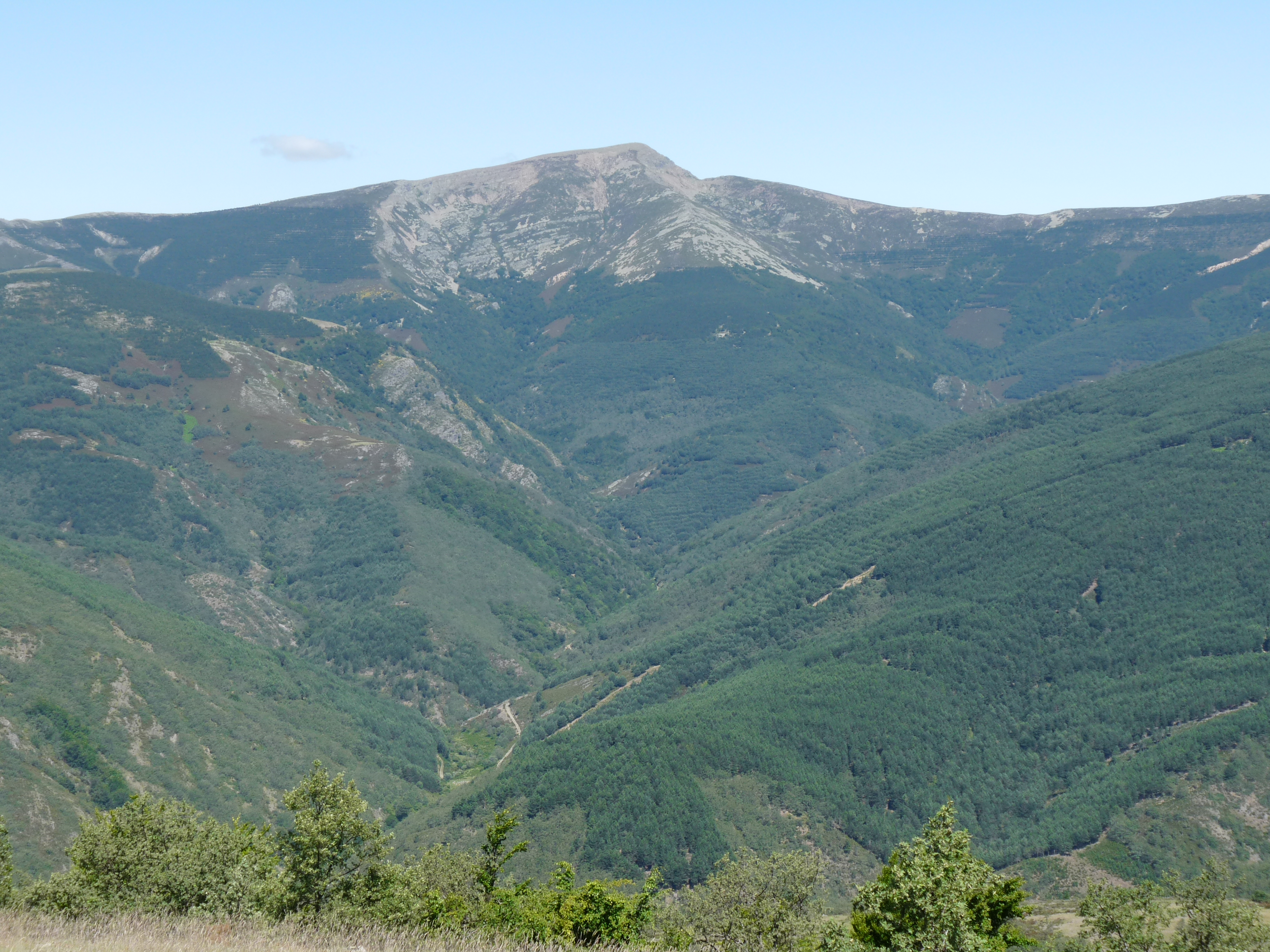
- Southern slope of Pico San Millán in summer

Highest point
- Elevation: 2,131 m (6,991 ft)
- Prominence: 319 m (1,047 ft)
- Coordinates: 42°13′54″N 03°12′23″W

Geography
- Location within Spain
- Location: Pineda de la Sierra, Santa Cruz del Valle Urbión and Barbadillo de Herreros, Burgos, Spain
- Parent range: Sierra de la Demanda

Pico San Millán, also known as El Torruco, is a mountain of the Iberian Peninsula and the highest summit of the province of Burgos (Castile and León, Spain), rising 2,131 metres (6,991 feet) with a prominence of 319 metres (1,047 feet). Situated in the Sierra de la Demanda mountain range, the northwesternmost end of the Iberian System, it is part of the Sierra de la Demanda Natural Area and Special Protection Area (ZEPA) for its nature and birdlife.

The summit marks the boundary between the comarcas of Montes de Oca and Sierra de la Demanda, as well as the tripoint of the municipalities of Santa Cruz del Valle Urbión (Montes de Oca) Barbadillo de Herreros (Sierra de la Demanda), and Pineda de la Sierra (Sierra de la Demanda).

== Toponymy ==
The mountain has two main toponyms. The first, Pico San Millán, commonly shortened to San Millán, honors Aemilian of Cogolla, a venerated Iberian saint who, according to tradition, lived as a hermit in the Sierra de la Demanda. While pico translates to "peak" in Spanish, "San Millán" derives from the medieval name of the saint. The second toponym, El Torruco or Torruco, is more traditionally used among locals, although its exact etymology remains uncertain; hypotheses debate whether it derives from the Spanish word for tower (torre), a regional term for a shepherds' stone cairn, or an ancient Pre-Roman orographic root (*tor-) meaning "hill" or "elevation".

== Geography ==
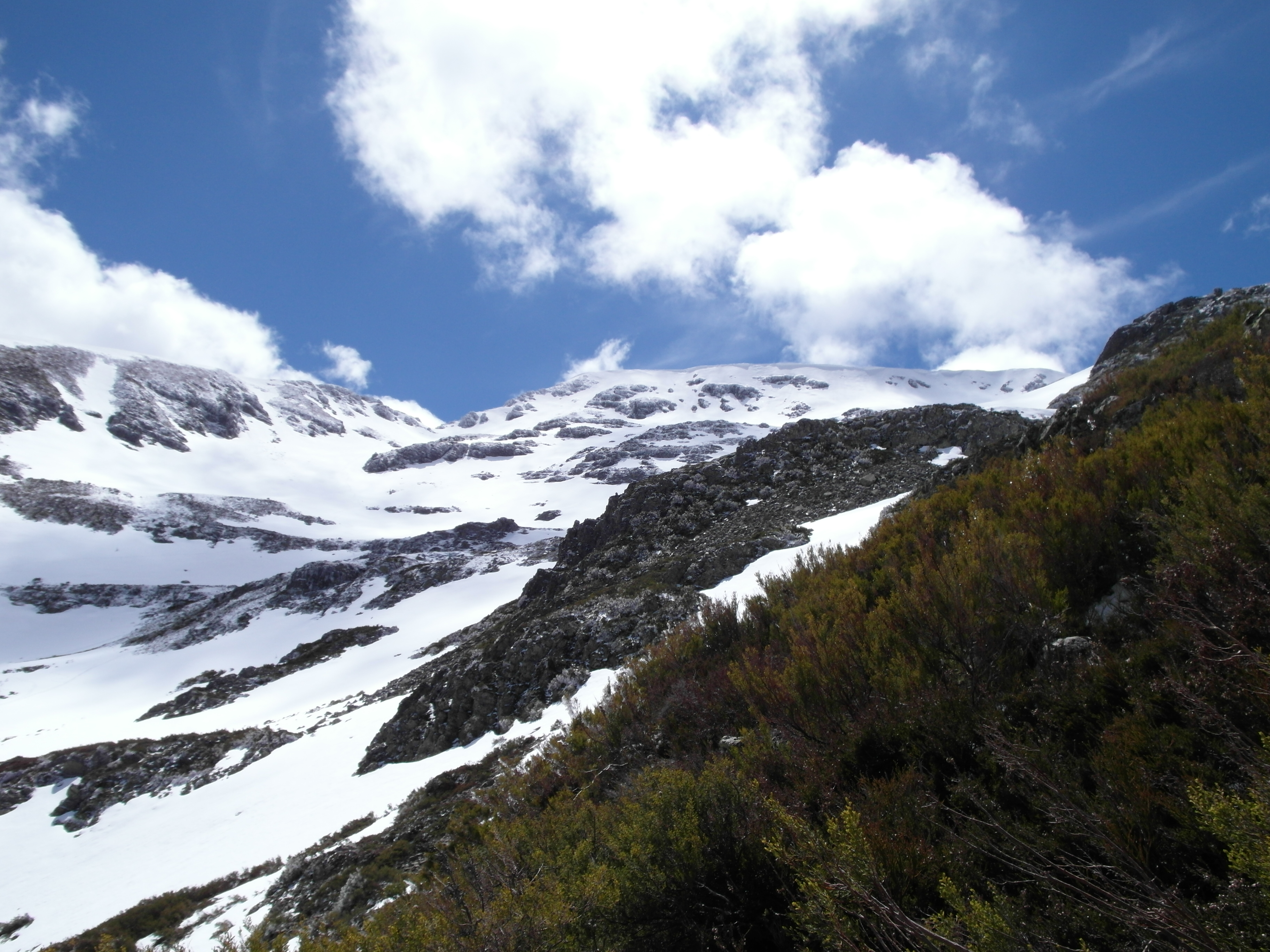
Glacial morphology on the north slope

Pico San Millán is an ancient Paleozoic mountain within the Sierra de la Demanda range. Originally formed during the Variscan orogeny 300 million years ago and later uplifted by the Alpine orogeny 60 million years ago, its current morphology was sculpted during the Würm glaciation approximately 10,000 years ago, leaving a small glacial cirque, a seasonal tarn, and moraines on its northern face. Geologically, it is composed of Cambrian conglomerates, shales, and metasandstones, while prolonged erosion has ultimately shaped it into a rounded, non-jagged summit.

The peak anchors the Sierra de San Millán, a U-shaped subrange trending northwest to northeast, separating the Montes de Oca and the Sierra de la Demanda comarcas. Other notable nearby peaks include Trigaza (2,085 m, 6,841 ft) and Cabeza Aguilez (2,029 m, 6,657 ft). Although part of the same overall Sierra de la Demanda range, Monte San Lorenzo (2,271 m, 7,451 ft)—its highest summit—is located outside this specific subrange, lying further away in La Rioja.

As a hydrological divide, the mountain separates the Ebro (Mediterranean) and Douro (Atlantic) basins. Its northern slope features a seasonal glacial tarn at 1,950 m (6,398 ft), with its waters filtering into the upper catchment of the Urbión River, which encompasses the Altuzarra waterfalls along one of its many tributary streams. Conversely, the southern slope feeds the headwaters of both the Arlanzón and the Pedroso rivers.

The climate is montane at the peak, with continental Mediterranean and oceanic climate influences at lower elevations. Temperatures decrease with altitude, featuring significant diurnal variations (12 °C in summer, 5 °C in winter), while precipitation (1,200–1,800 mm/year) increases with elevation, frequently occurring as snow from October to May. Consequently, the shady northern slope (umbría) experiences colder, wetter conditions, whereas the sunny southern slope (solana) remains warmer and drier.

Due to its status as a protected area, the mountain remains largely undeveloped, lacking major infrastructure such as paved roads or ski resorts. This environment contrasts with the nearby summits of Monte San Lorenzo and Pico Mencilla, which feature anthropic modifications from the Valdezcaray ski resort and the defunct Valle del Sol facilities.

== Flora and Fauna ==
The Urbión River, a vital habitat for local fauna like the Pyrenean desman

The Pico San Millán and its surroundings form a vital biogeographical crossroads, merging Mediterranean and Eurosiberian ecological zones. Lower elevations feature extensive oak groves, while mid-altitude areas host shady beech forests, reforested pine stands, and other trees like birches, hollies, rowans, and yews. At higher altitudes, forests transition to heather-dominated landscapes, giving way to rocky outcrops, scree slopes, and high-mountain pastures near the summit, where short-lived plants such as foxglove, wild lily, blue whortleberry, cowslips, doradilla, Venus' navelwort, wall germander, lion's foot, and polypody thrive.

These ecosystems support diverse fauna, including mammals like the wolf, red deer, roe deer, wild boar, otter, wildcat, genet, badger, and Pyrenean desman, with the brown bear extinct locally due to 20th-century hunting. Notable birds include the golden eagle, short-toed snake eagle, booted eagle, northern goshawk, honey buzzard, Eurasian eagle-owl, red-legged partridge, reed warbler, treecreeper, serin, griffon vulture, cinereous vulture, sparrowhawk, great spotted woodpecker, lesser spotted woodpecker, turtle dove, kestrel, blackbird, goldfinch, and coal tit, alongside reptiles like the Iberian skink and alpine newt. The area is a significant corridor for migratory birds like geese and storks.

== Climbing routes ==
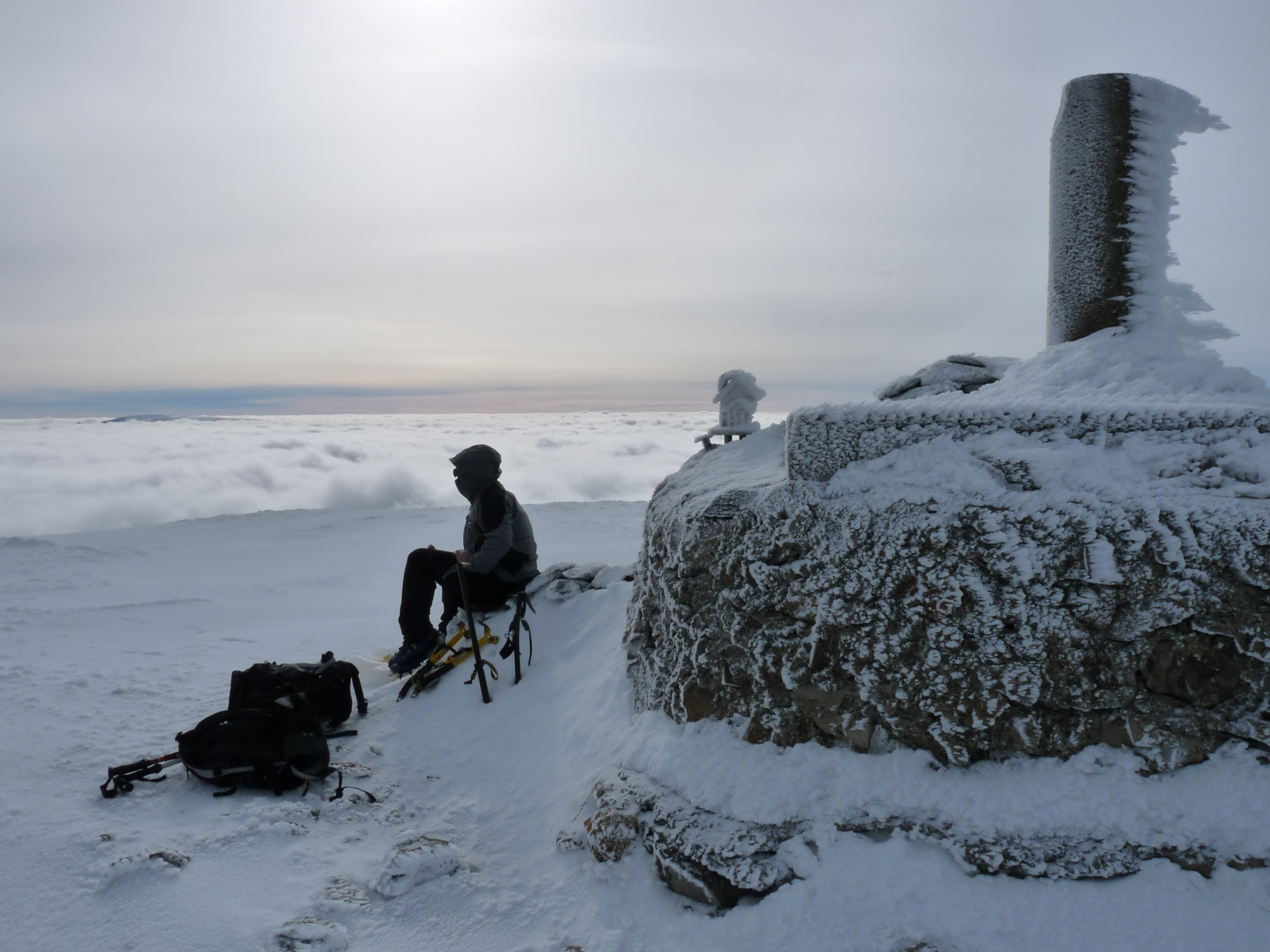
Pico San Millán's triangulation station in winter

Pico San Millán can be climbed from several surrounding villages and mountain passes. The principal routes start from Pineda de la Sierra, Santa Cruz del Valle Urbión and Barbadillo de Herreros, while the route from the Manquillo mountain pass is considered one of the gentler approaches to the summit, covering approximately 19 km round trip and gaining about 700 m of elevation. The route from Pineda de la Sierra is generally considered the easiest of the main approaches, covering more than 18 km round trip with an elevation gain of about 944 m. The route from Santa Cruz del Valle Urbión, which passes near the Altuzarra waterfalls, is more demanding, with about 17 km and 1,300 m of elevation gain. From Barbadillo de Herreros, the route is longer, at approximately 22 km round trip, and gains about 1,000 m.

The northern approach from Santa Cruz del Valle Urbión includes steeper sections and can require basic mountaineering and scrambling skills. In winter, snow and ice may make crampons and an ice axe necessary. From the summit, broad views extend across northern and central Spain, including the Cantabrian Mountains to the north and the Central System to the south. The Montaña Palentina and the Picos de Urbión can also be seen, while the Pyrenees may be visible on exceptionally clear days.

== See also ==
- Sierra de la Demanda
- Sistema Ibérico
- List of mountains in Spain
