= Arlanzón =

Arlanzón may refer to:

- Arlanzón (river), a tributary of the Arlanza in Burgos, Spain
- Arlanzón, Province of Burgos, a municipality in Castile and León, Spain
