= Arlanza =

Arlanza may refer to:

- Arlanza (river), a river in Spain
  - Arlanza (comarca), an area of Spain
  - Arlanza (DO), a Spanish wine from the area
  - San Pedro de Arlanza, a Benedictine monastery
- Arlanza, California
- RMS Arlanza (1911), a British liner in service from 1912 to 1938
- SS Arlanza (1960), a liner launched in 1960
