= Arlanza (river) =

River in Spain

Coordinates: 42°1′51.03″N 3°35′40.36″W

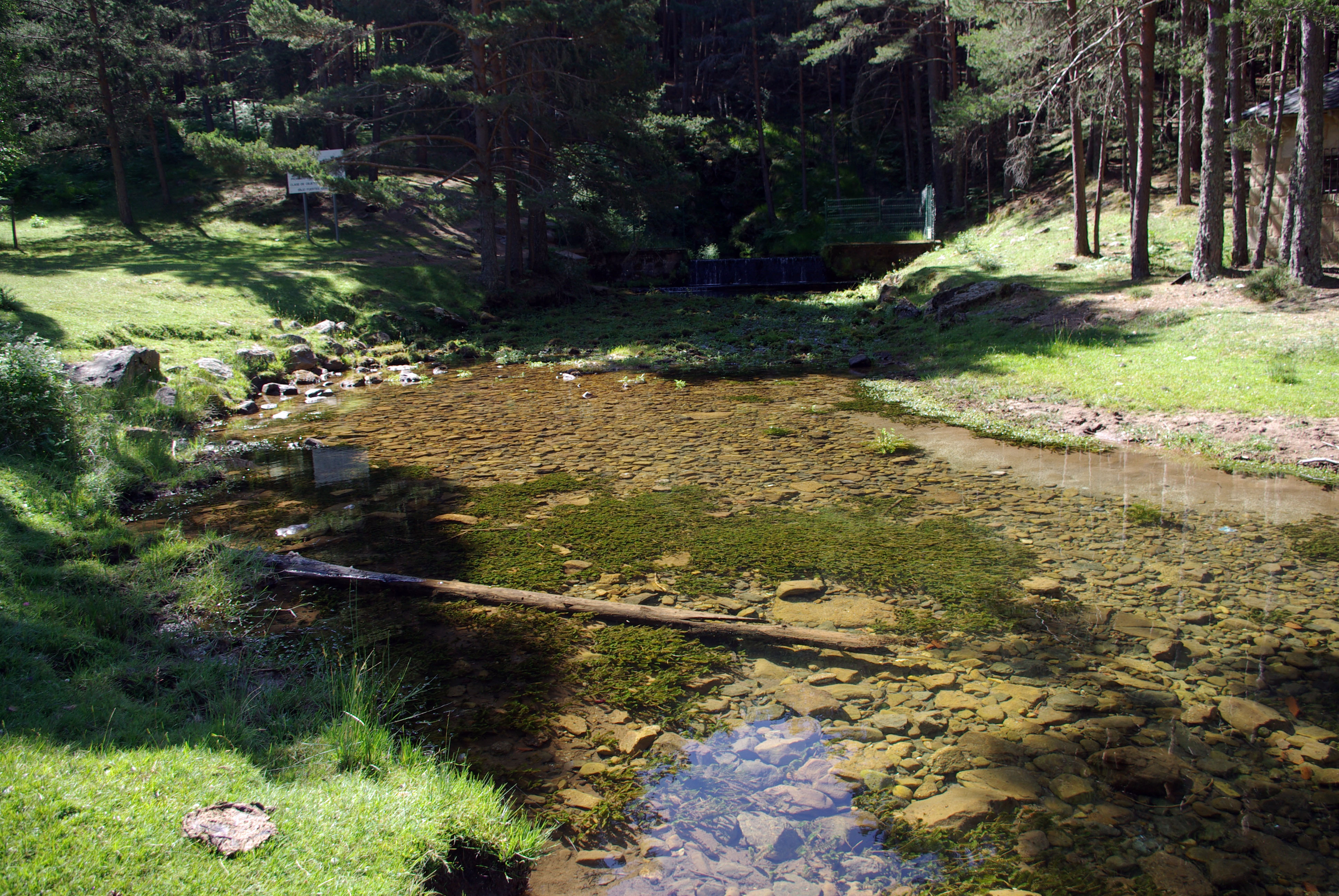
- Source of the Arlanza in Fuente Sanza (Sierra de la Demanda)

Location
- Country: Spain

Physical characteristics
- Source: Fuente Sanza
  - location: Quintanar de la Sierra, Sierra de la Demanda, Burgos, Castile and León, Spain
  - elevation: 1,282 m (4,206 ft)
- Mouth: La Requejada, Pisuerga river
  - location: Torquemada, Cerrato, Palencia, Castile and León, Spain
  - elevation: 737 m (2,418 ft)
- Length: 160 km (99 mi)

Basin features
- Tributaries
  - left: Zumel, Abejón, Ciruelos, Mataviejas, Revilla, Franco
  - right: Pedroso, San Martín, Cubillo, Arlanzón

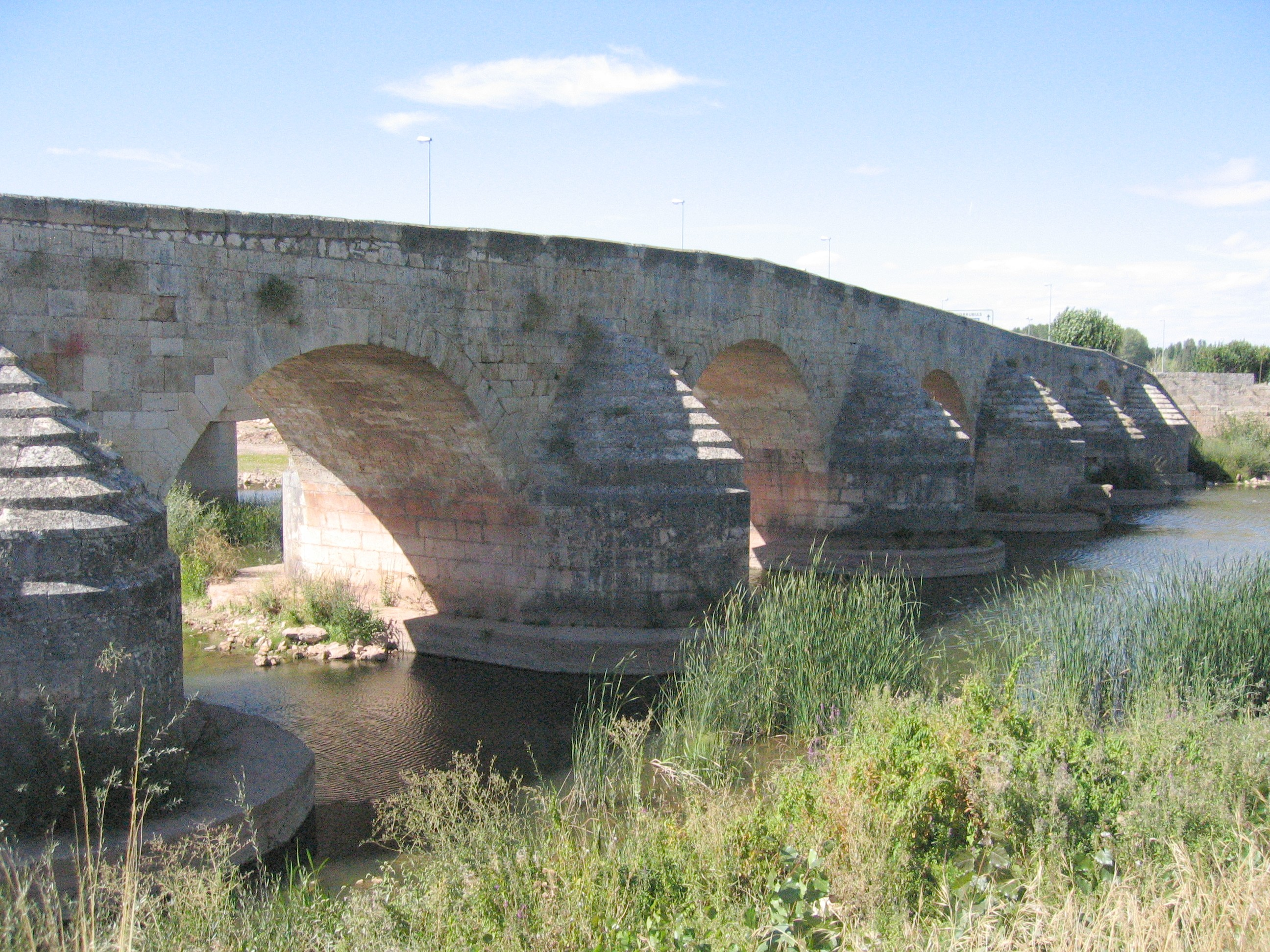
The Arlanza River at Lerma, Burgos, mediaeval bridge

The Arlanza River rises in the Sierra de la Demanda, near Quintanar de la Sierra in an area known as Fuente Sanza. As it flows through the province of Burgos, Spain, it passes through the municipalities of Castrovido, Salas de los Infantes, Covarrubias and Lerma, broadly east to west roughly parallel to and north of the River Duero.

Its main tributary is the River Arlanzón that joins near Quintana del Puente shortly before the Arlanza itself joins River Pisuerga which in turn joins the Duero.

It gives its name to the Arlanza wine region, a Spanish Denominación de Origen.

== See also ==
- Rubagón
