= San Medel =

Village in Burgos, Spain

- Locality
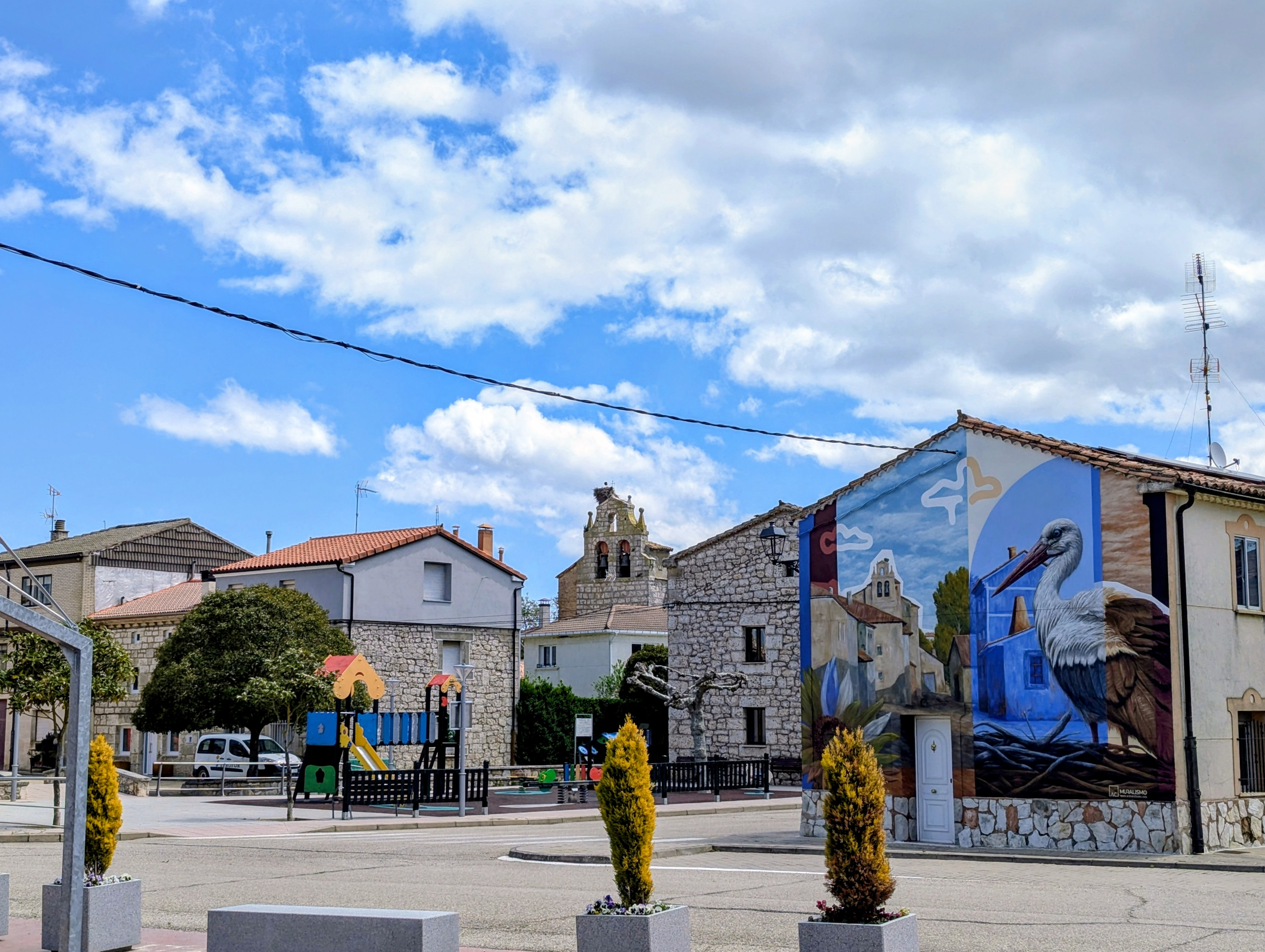
- View of San Medel

- Seal
- Interactive map of San Medel
- Coordinates: 42°19′56″N 3°35′50″W
- Country: Spain
- Province: Burgos
- Comarca: Alfoz de Burgos
- Municipality: Cardeñajimeno

Population (2024)
  - Total: 279
- Website: San Medel (Cardeñajimeno)

San Medel (Spanish pronunciation: [sˈan meðˈel]) is a locality and minor local entity belonging to the municipality of Cardeñajimeno, in the province of Burgos, autonomous community of Castile and León, Spain. It belongs to the comarca of Alfoz de Burgos and to the judicial district of Burgos. According to the 2024 census (INE), San Medel has a population of 279 inhabitants.

The toponym refers to Saint Emeterius, a venerated Iberian martyr known in Spanish as San Medel, whose cult in the region was associated with the dedication of a small hermitage to him and Saint Celedonio, around which the population gradually concentrated, gradually replacing over time the earlier designation of the settlement, "Villabáscones". The original name, traditionally interpreted as indicating the Basque origin of its early settlers, dates from the 10th century repopulation of the upper Arlanzón valley. Over time, the settlement adopted the compound form "Villabáscones de San Medel" and later the abbreviated form "Samedel", before the present name San Medel was definitively established.

The village's heritage includes the 16th century Church of Our Lady of La Asunción, notable for its Renaissance architecture, churrigueresque altarpiece, and a carving of Our Lady of Mount Carmel. Other traditional features include the 1949 wayside cross, “Cruz del Campo”, a potro de herrar (livestock crush) historically used to shoe cattle, and the Cauce Molinar, a historic irrigation channel that once powered local watermills. Several houses retain the stone rural architecture characteristic of the area, reflecting traditional construction methods coexisting with modern residences.

Gallery

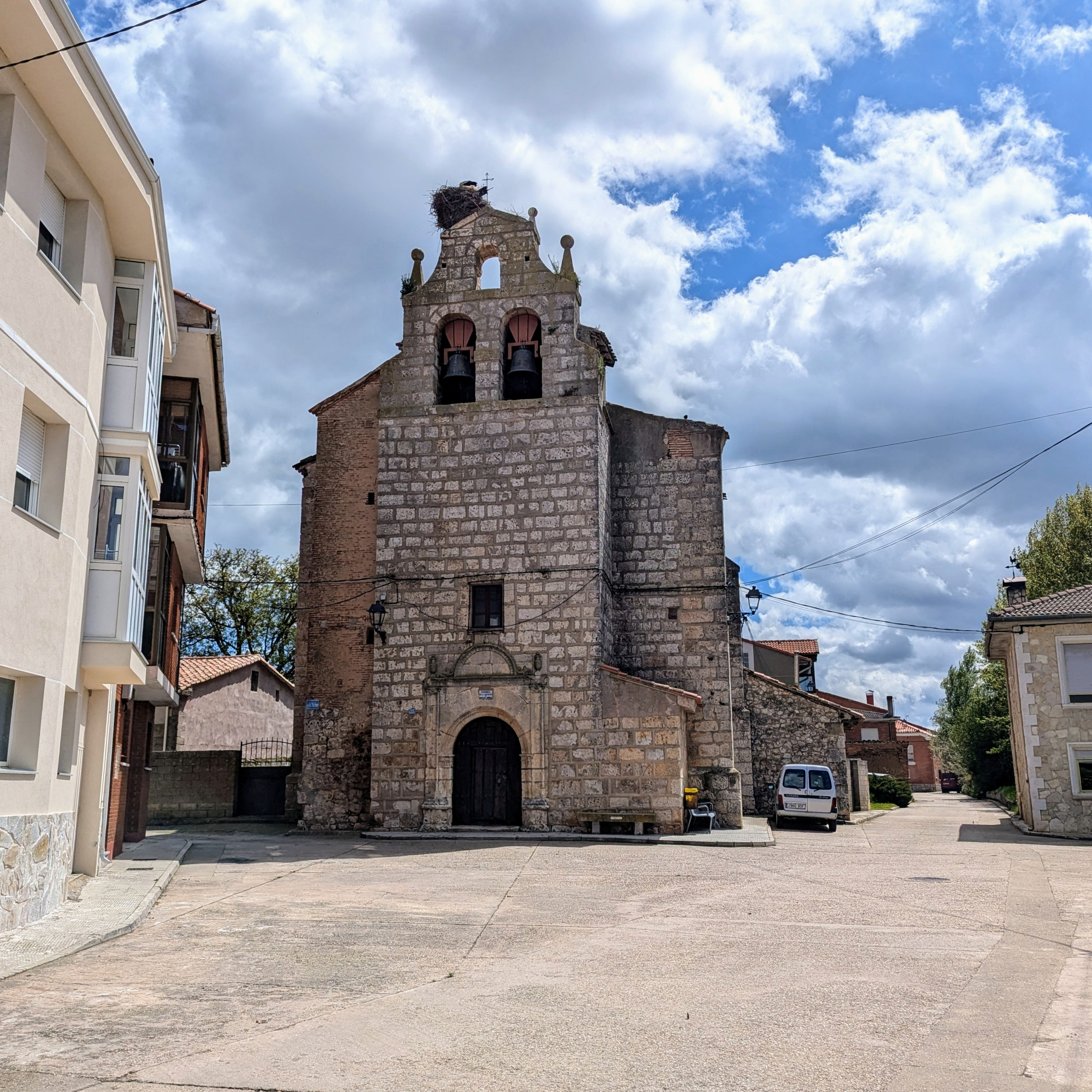
Church of La Asunción

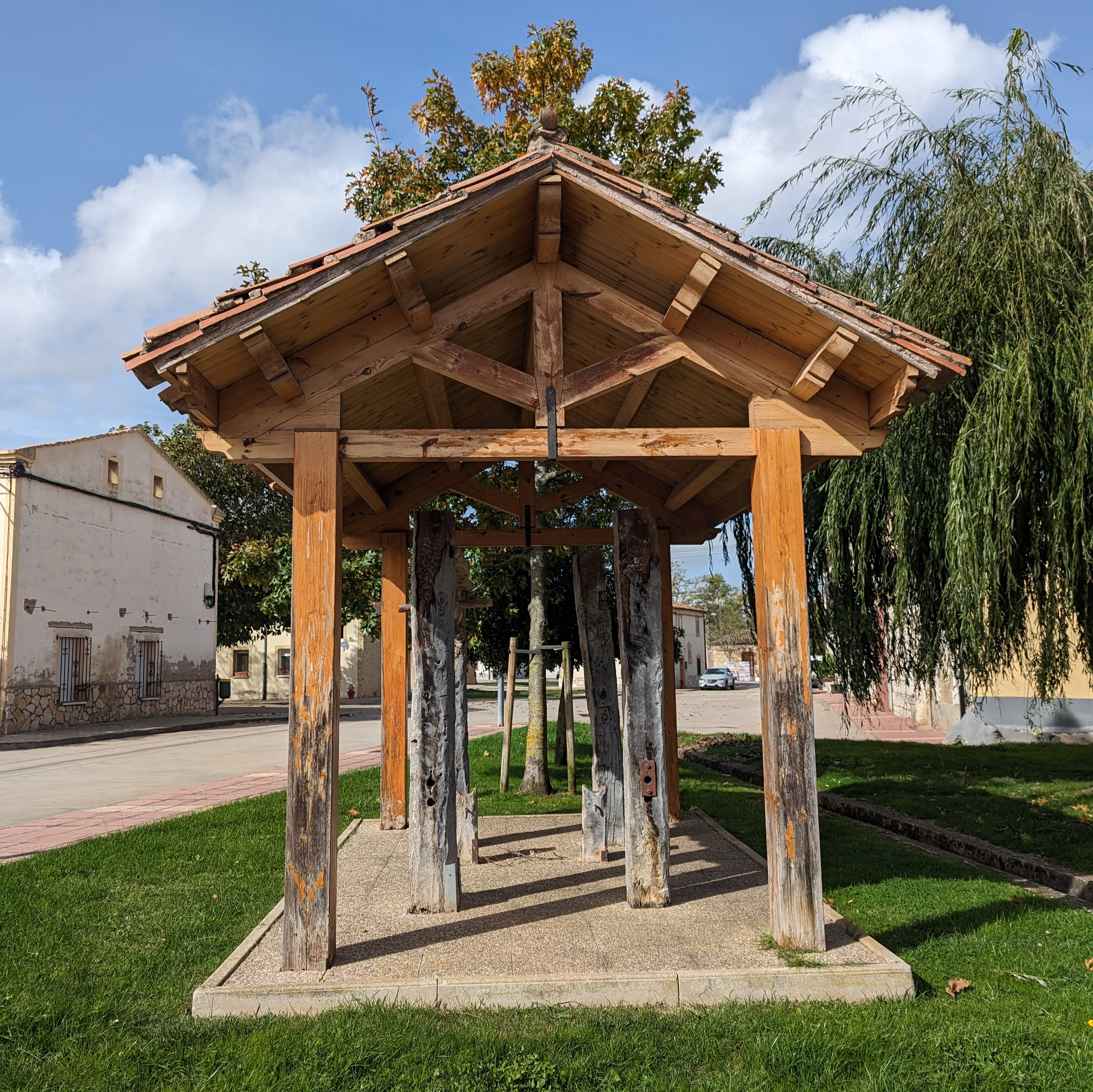
Potro de herrar

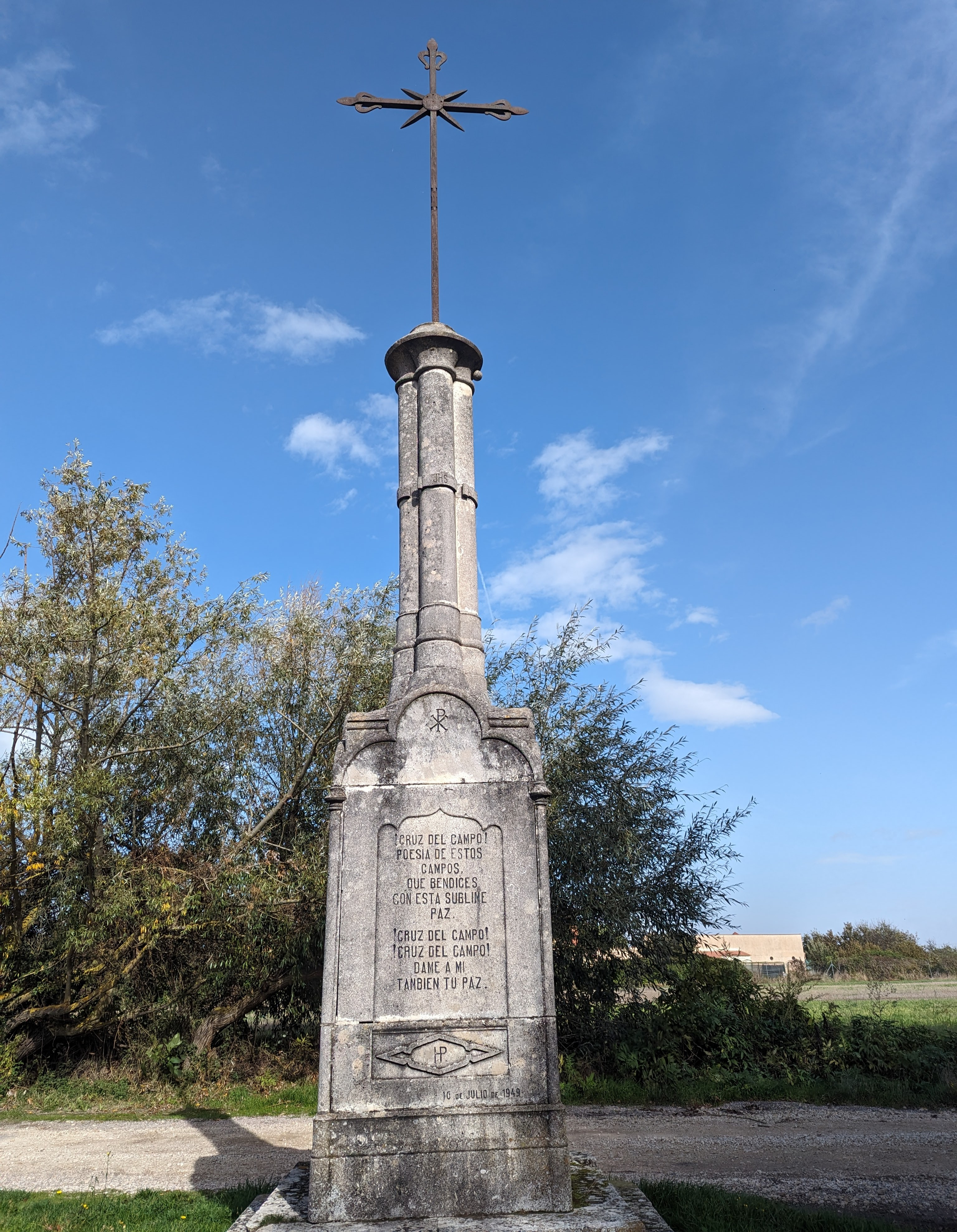
Cruz del Campo

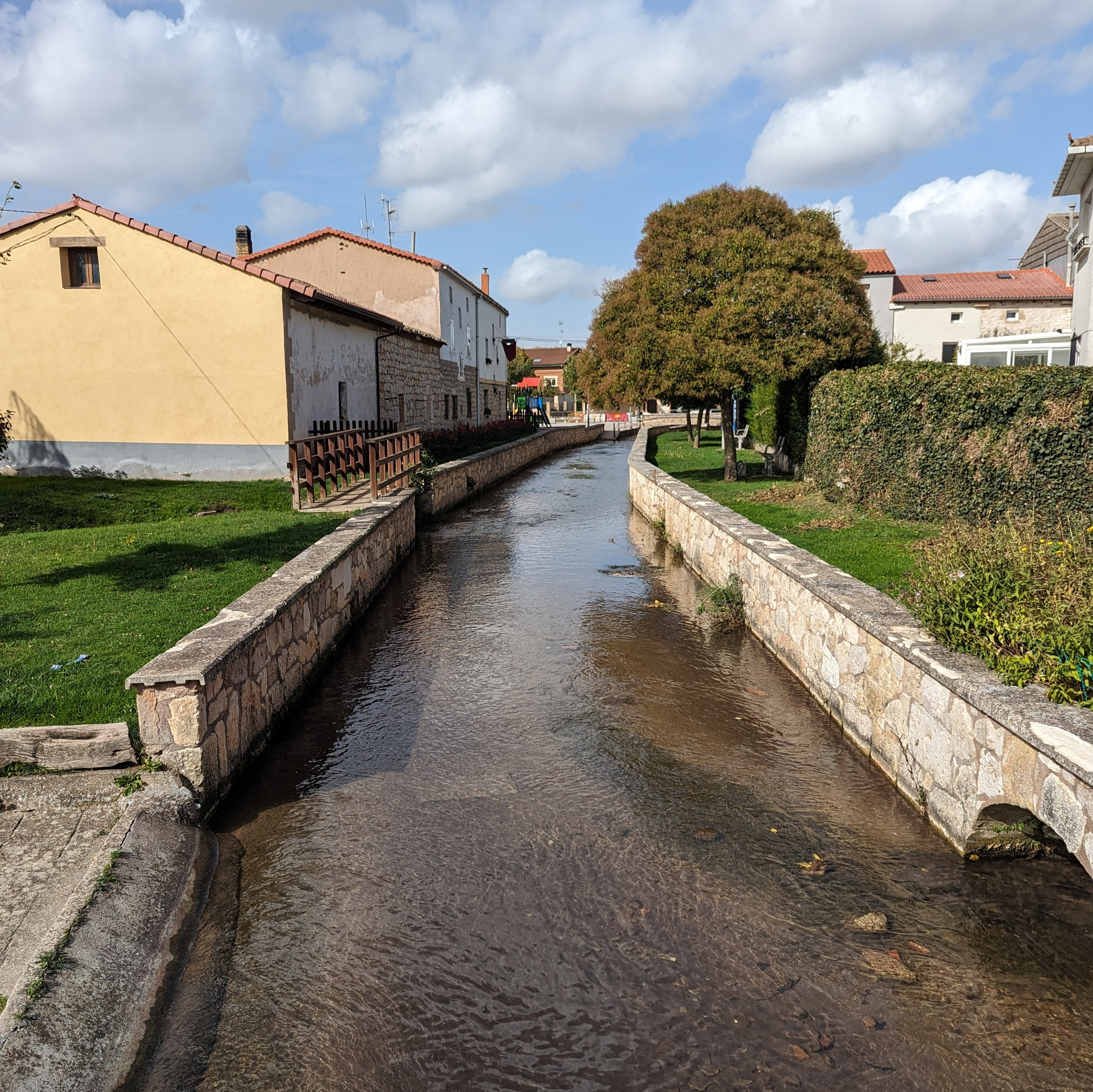
Cauce Molinar
