= Lerma, Province of Burgos =

Lerma
- Municipality and town
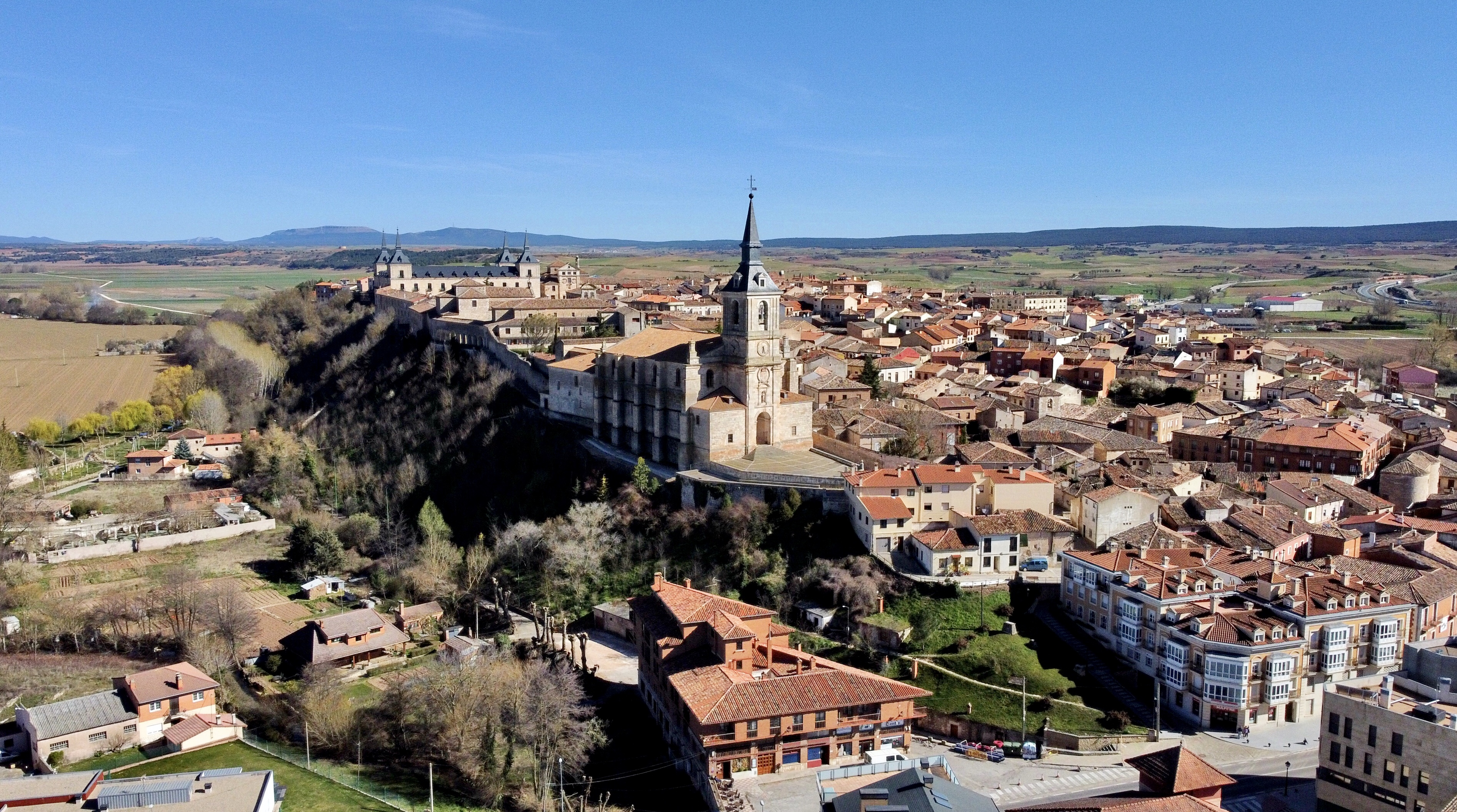
- View of Lerma, 2021

- Flag Coat of arms
- Interactive map of Lerma
- Coordinates: 42°1′35″N 3°45′32″W
- Country: Spain
- Autonomous community: Castile and León
- Province: Burgos
- Comarca: Arlanza

Government
  - Mayor: Celia Izquierdo Arroyo (Iniciativa por Lerma)

Area
  - Total: 166.4 km^{2} (64.2 sq mi)
- Elevation: 849 m (2,785 ft)

Population (2025-01-01)
  - Total: 2,629
  - Density: 15.80/km^{2} (40.92/sq mi)
- Postal code: 09340
- Website: http://lerma.burgos.es/

Lerma is a town in the province of Burgos, part of the autonomous community of Castile and León, Spain. It has important monuments dating from the 17th century, which were built by the Duke of Lerma. The village is home to the headquarters of the Spanish wine denominación de origen protegida Arlanza DOP.

== History ==
The town of Lerma dates back to at least as far as the Iron Age, when the Celtiberian tribe of the vacceos lived in the area. The town was formed in a strategic position on a hill overlooking the Arlanza River. The area was then conquered in turn by the Romans, the Visigoths, and the Berbers, and in the 10th century was liberated by the Christians during the Reconquista when the Arlanza River became the border.

From then Lerma grew as a medieval walled town, and witnessed a period of significant growth and wealth in the 17th century. This growth included the construction of buildings in Herrerian style under the patronage of the Duke of Lerma that today are among the best-preserved historical-artistic complexes in Spain. After the death of the duke, the town went into slow decline. During the Peninsular War the town was occupied by French troops, who burned and looted the town and convents on their retreat

== Gallery ==
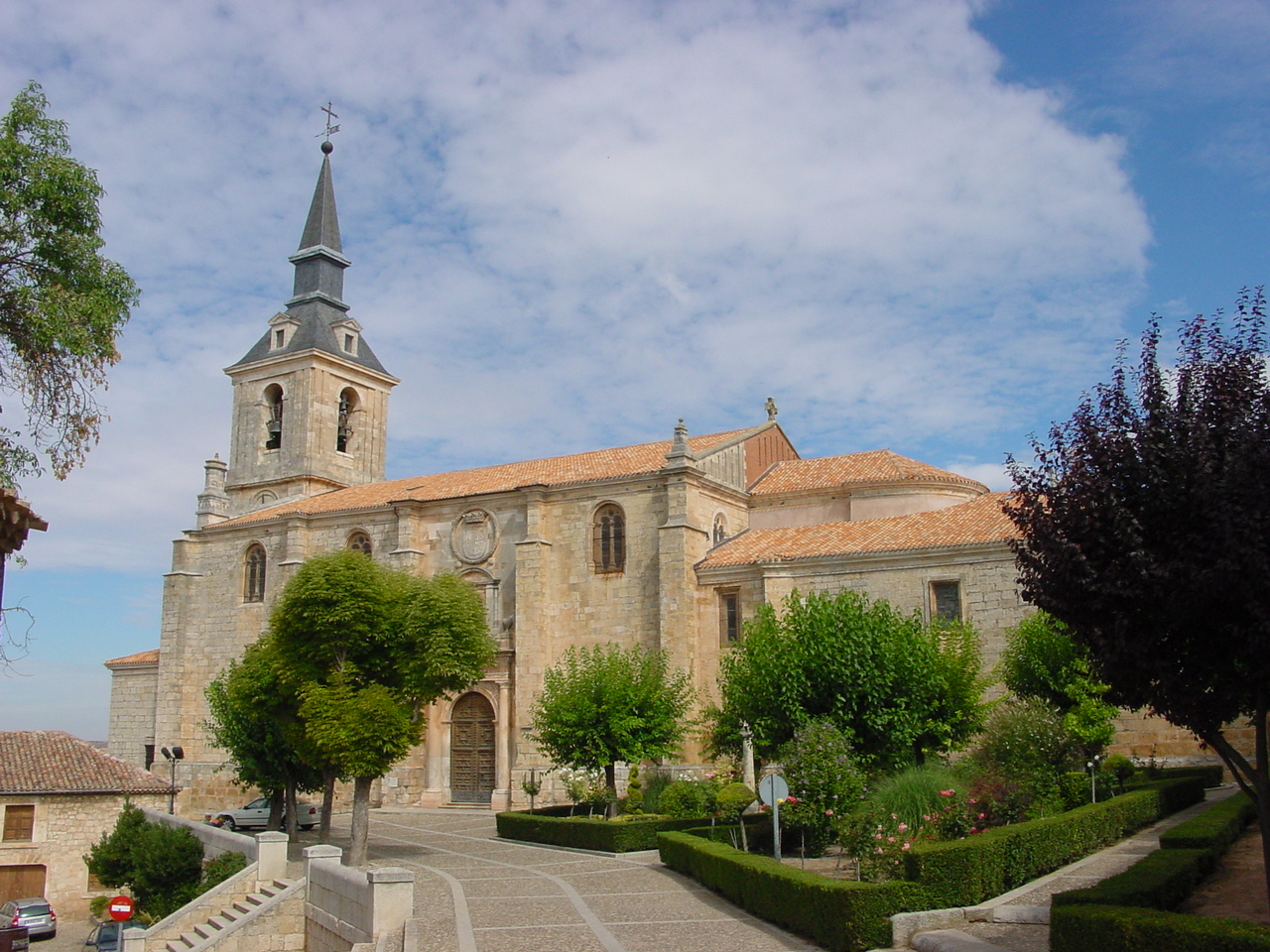
Collegiate church of San Pedro.

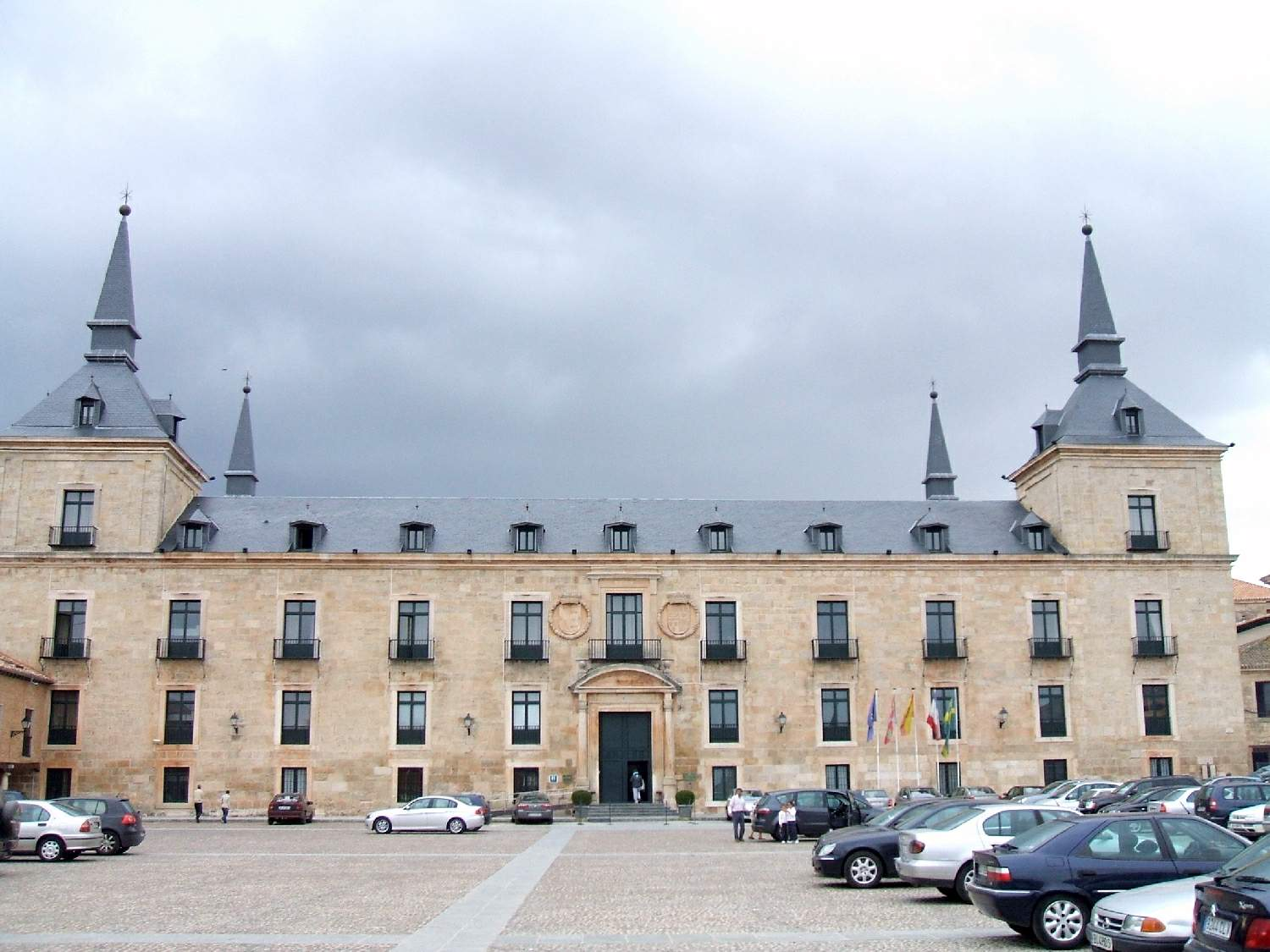
Ducal palace of Lerma.

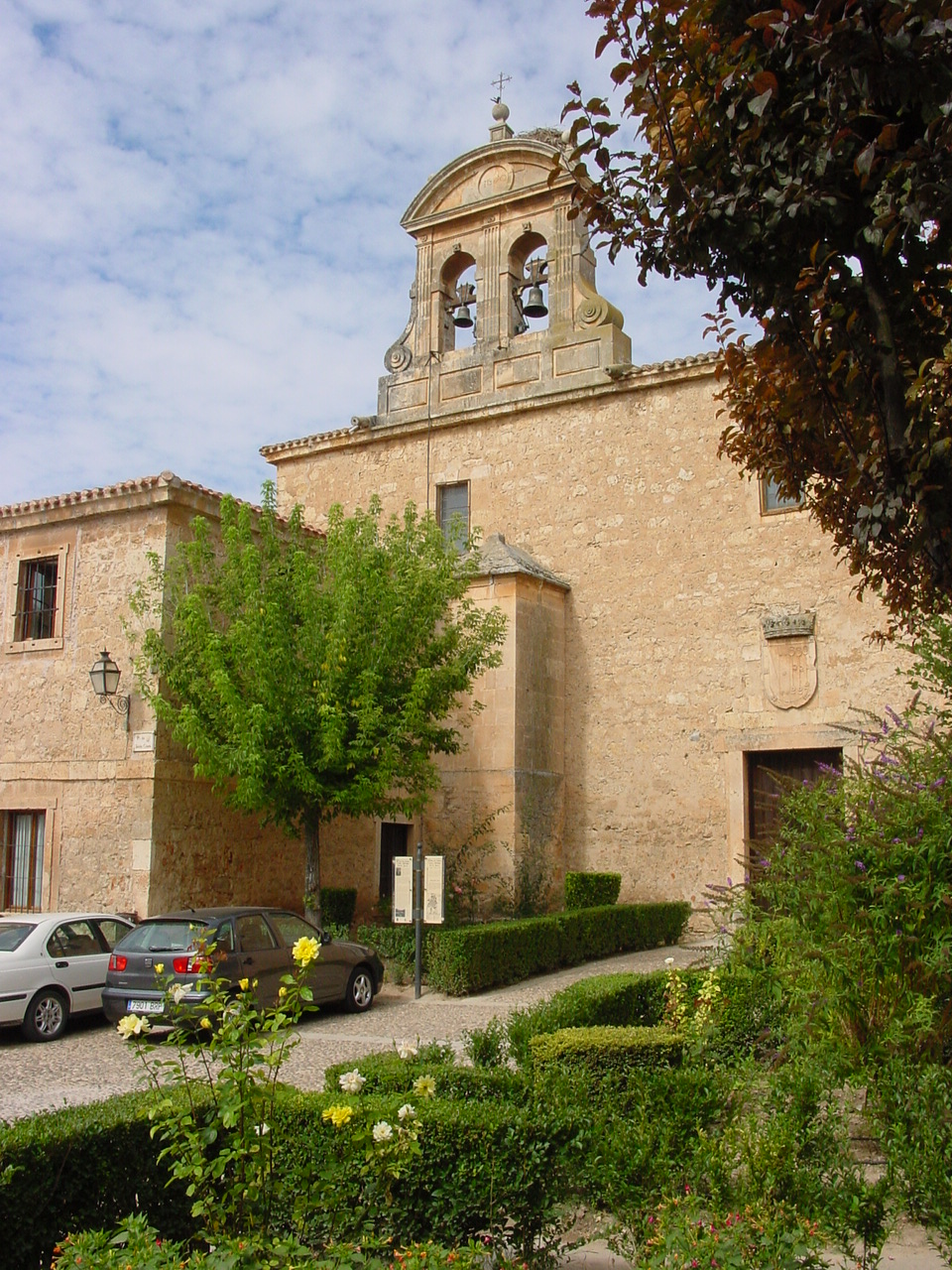
Monastery of la Ascensión de Nuestro Señor, also known as the Convento de Santa Clara.

== See also ==
- Spanish wine
