= Arlanzón, Province of Burgos =

Spanish municipality

Arlanzón
- Municipality and town
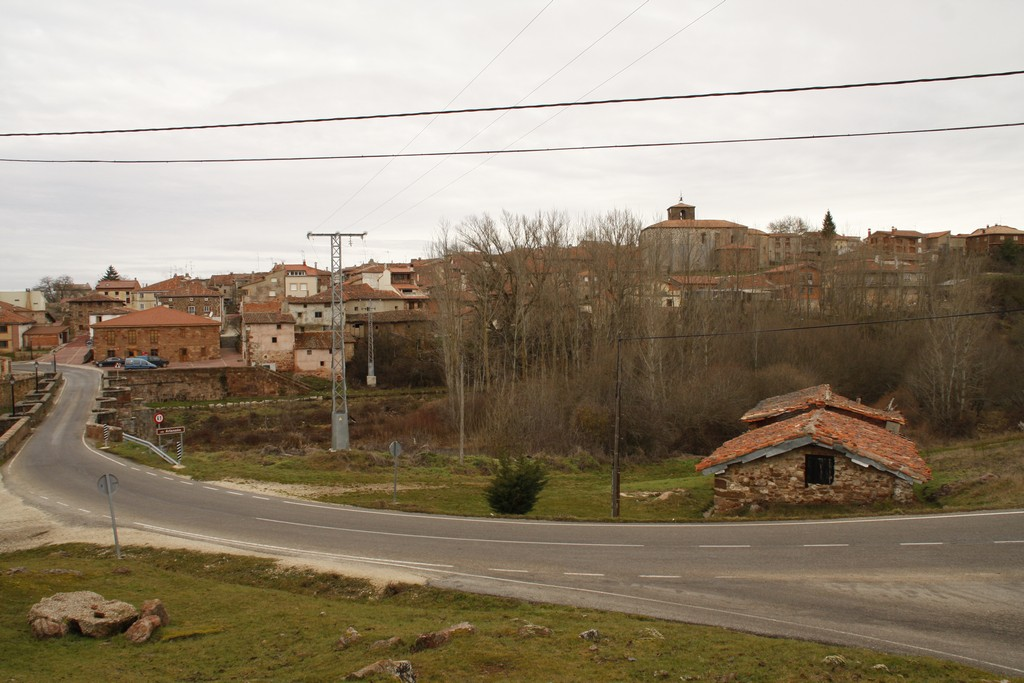
- View of Arlanzón, 2010

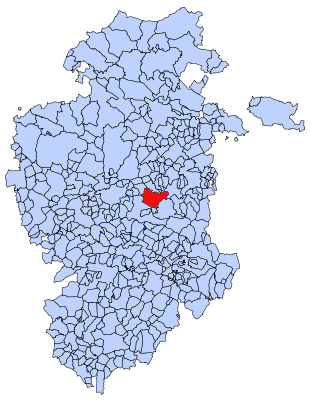
- Municipal location of Arlanzón in Burgos province

- Location within Castile and León Location within Spain
- Coordinates: 42°19′N 3°27′W
- Country: Spain
- Autonomous community: Castile and León
- Province: Burgos
- Comarca: Alfoz de Burgos

Area
  - Total: 77.74 km^{2} (30.02 sq mi)
- Elevation: 999 m (3,278 ft)

Population (2025-01-01)
  - Total: 425
  - Density: 5.47/km^{2} (14.2/sq mi)
- Time zone: UTC+1 (CET)
  - Summer (DST): UTC+2 (CEST)
- Postal code: 09199
- Website: http://www.arlanzon.es/

Arlanzón is a municipality and town located in the province of Burgos, Castile and León, Spain.

The municipality of Arlanzón is made up of five settlements: Arlanzón (seat or capital), Agés, Galarde, Santovenia de Oca and Zalduendo.

== Demography ==
According to the 2025 census (INE), the municipality had a population of 425 inhabitants.

== Trails ==
One of the variants of the Camino de Santiago passes through the area. The Camino is a World Heritage Site ("Routes of Santiago de Compostela: Camino Francés and Routes of Northern Spain").

The Greenway of the Sierra de la Demanda, a former railway line, leads from Arlanzón to Monterrubio de la Demanda.
