= Cardeñajimeno =

Coordinates: 42°20′N 3°37′W

- Municipality and town
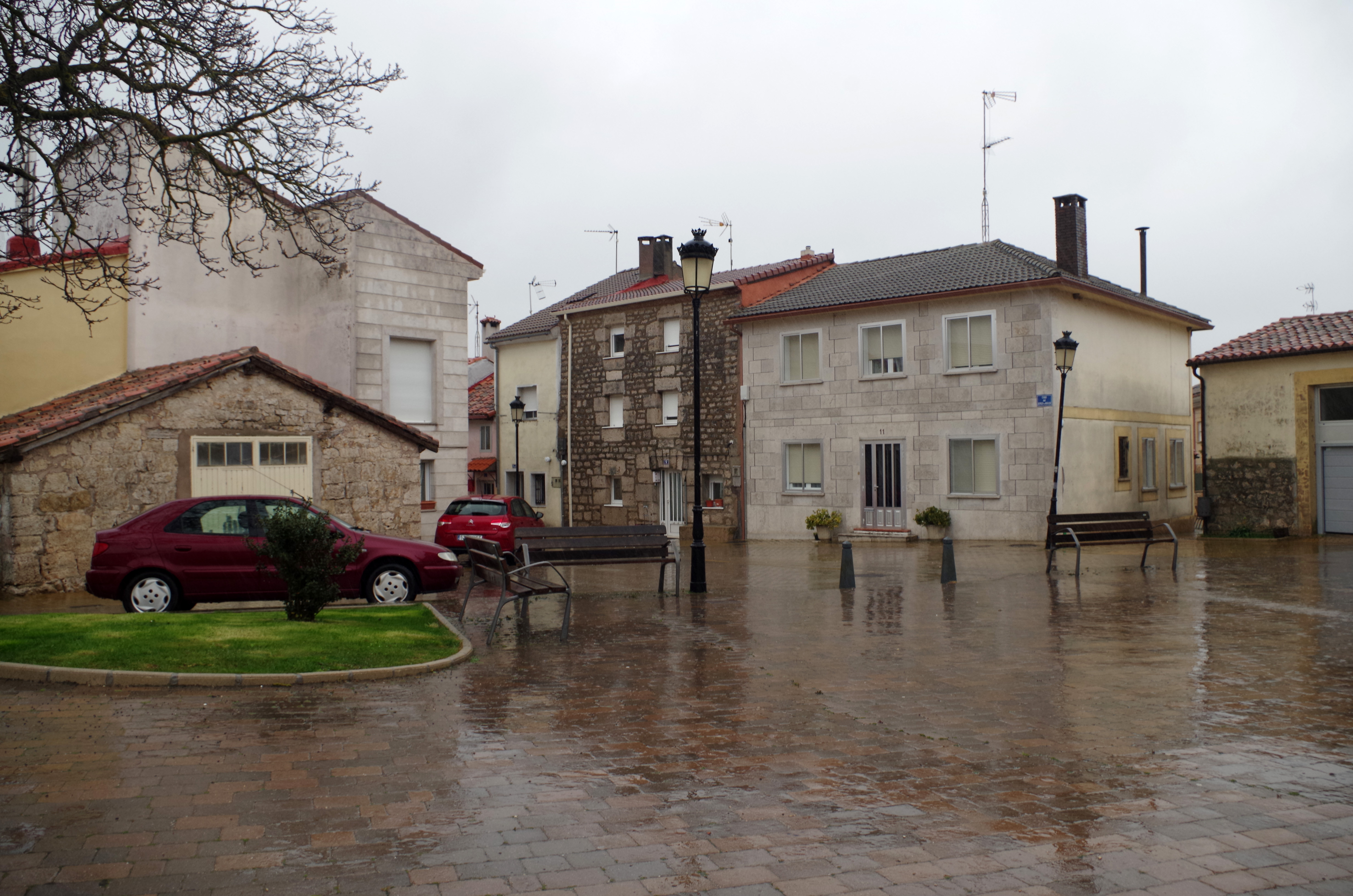
- View of Cardeñajimeno.

- Coat of arms
- Interactive map of Cardeñajimeno
- Country: Spain
- Autonomous community: Castile and León
- Province: Burgos
- Comarca: Alfoz de Burgos
- Founded: 9th century

Area
  - Total: 12 km^{2} (4.6 sq mi)
- Elevation: 922 m (3,025 ft)

Population (2025-01-01)
  - Total: 1,185
  - Density: 99/km^{2} (260/sq mi)
- Time zone: UTC+1 (CET)
  - Summer (DST): UTC+2 (CEST)
- Postal code: 09193

Cardeñajimeno (Spanish pronunciation: [kaɾðeɲaxiˈmeno]) is a village and municipality located in the province of Burgos, in the autonomous community of Castile and León, Spain. It belongs to the comarca of Alfoz de Burgos and to the judicial district of Burgos. According to the 2025 census (INE), it has a population of 1,185 inhabitants. The municipality covers an area of 12.17 square kilometres (4.70 sq mi).

The municipality of Cardeñajimeno is made up of two localities: Cardeñajimeno (seat or capital) and San Medel.
