= San Lorenzo mountain (Spain) =

Mountain in Spain

Monte San Lorenzo
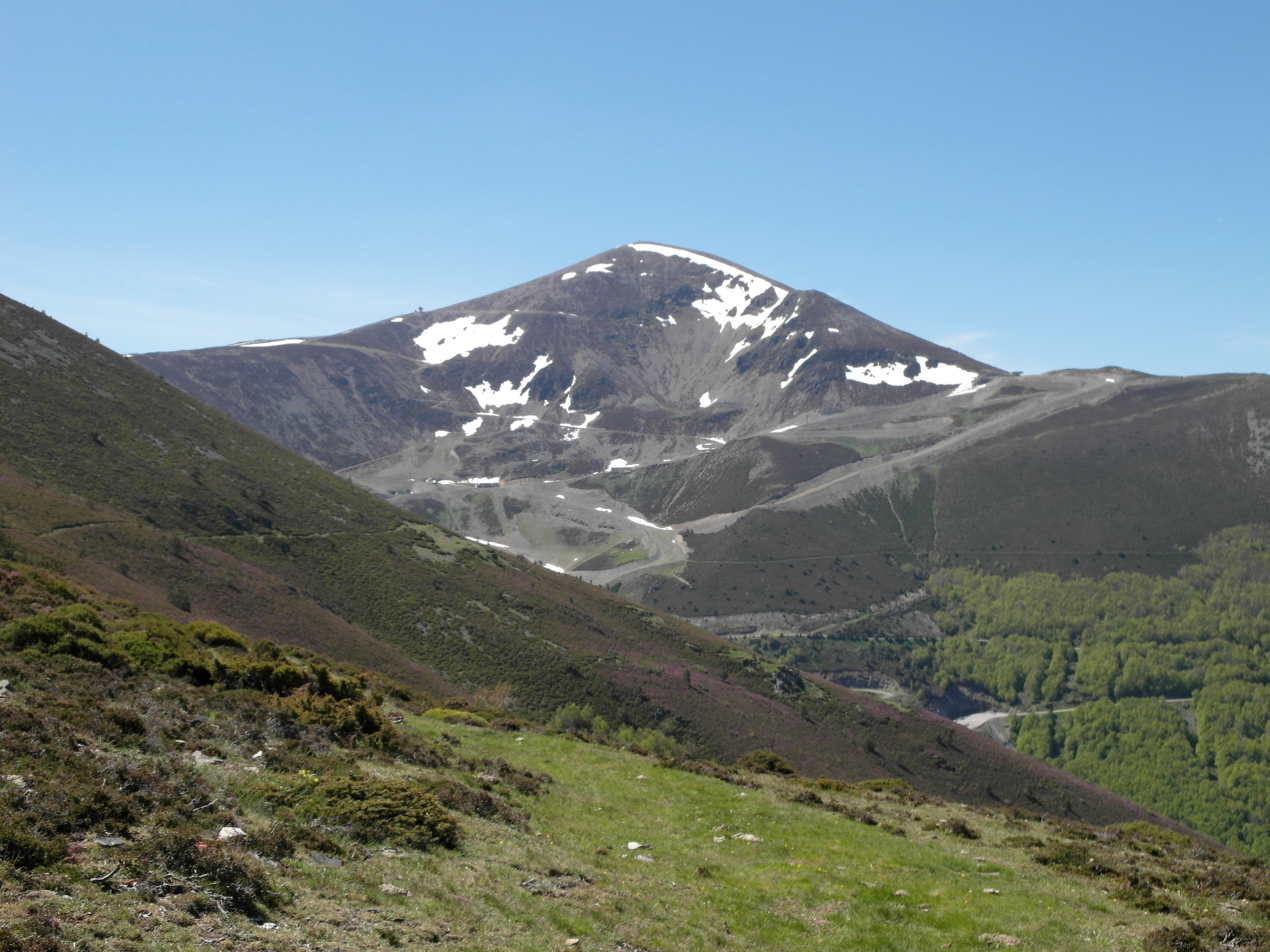
- View of San Lorenzo

Highest point
- Elevation: 2,271 m (7,451 ft)
- Prominence: 1,118 m (3,668 ft)
- Coordinates: 42°14′33″N 02°58′21″W

Naming
- English translation: Mount San Lorenzo
- Language of name: Spanish

Geography
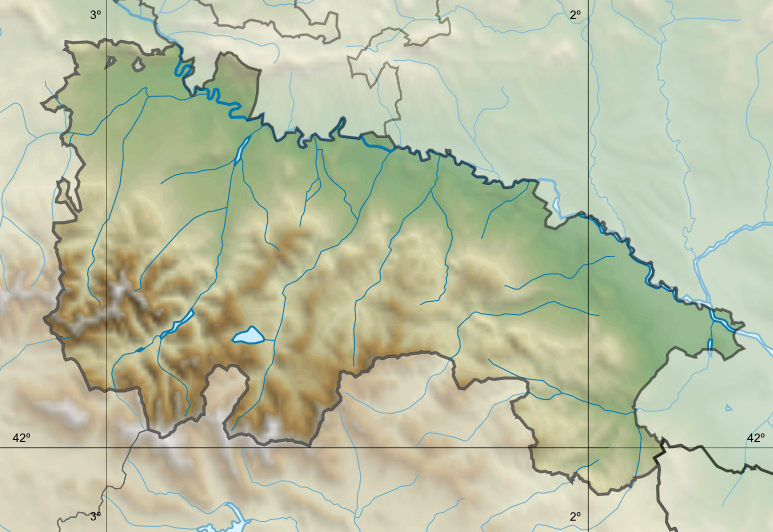
- Location within La Rioja, Spain Location within Spain
- Location: Ezcaray and Villavelayo, La Rioja, Spain
- Parent range: Sierra de la Demanda

San Lorenzo (2,271 metres (7,451 ft)) is a mountain in the Sierra de la Demanda, which is part of the Sistema Ibérico mountain range in Spain. It is the highest peak in La Rioja autonomous community and also of the Sierra de la Demanda massif.

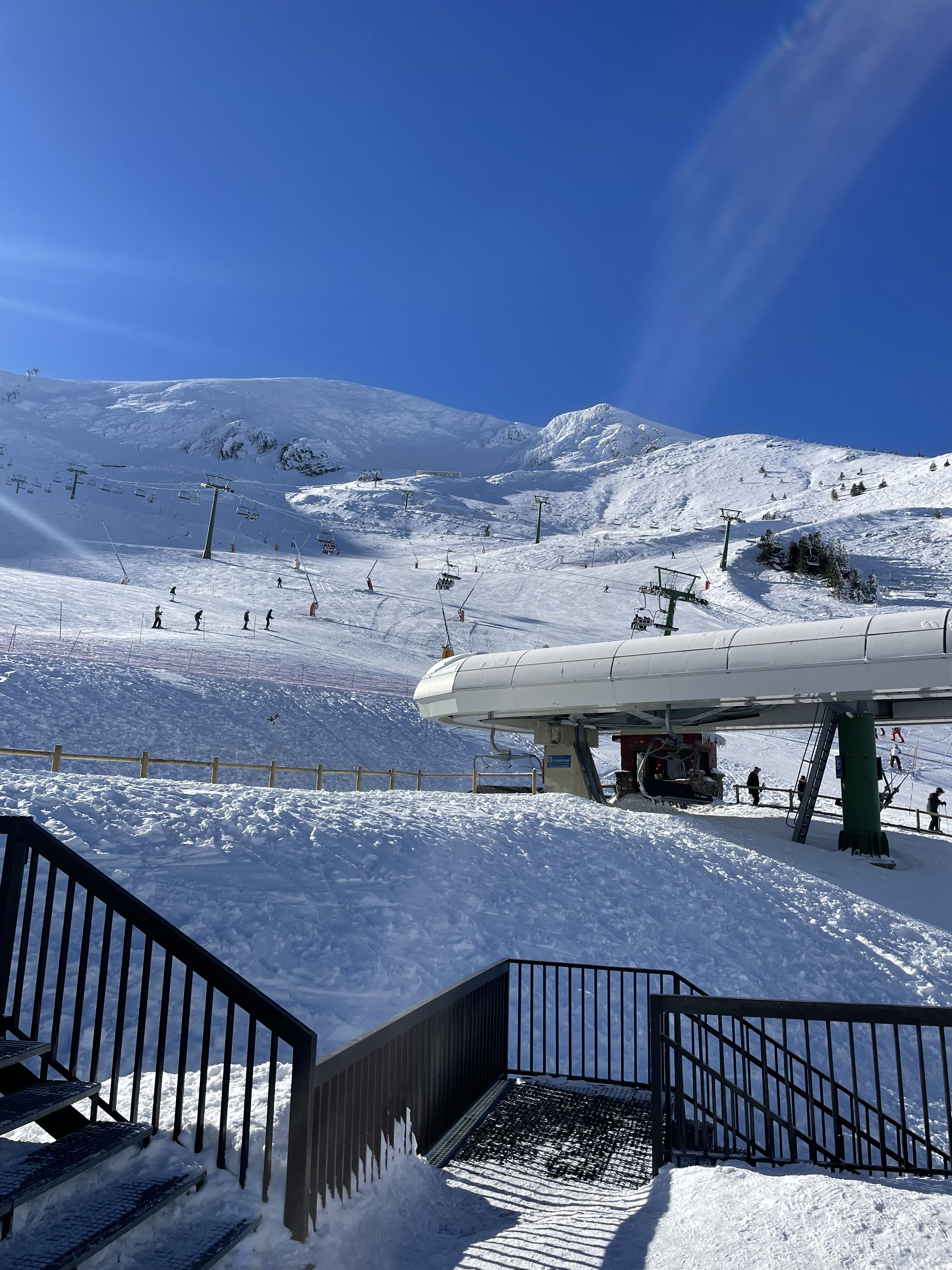
Valdezcaray Ski Resort

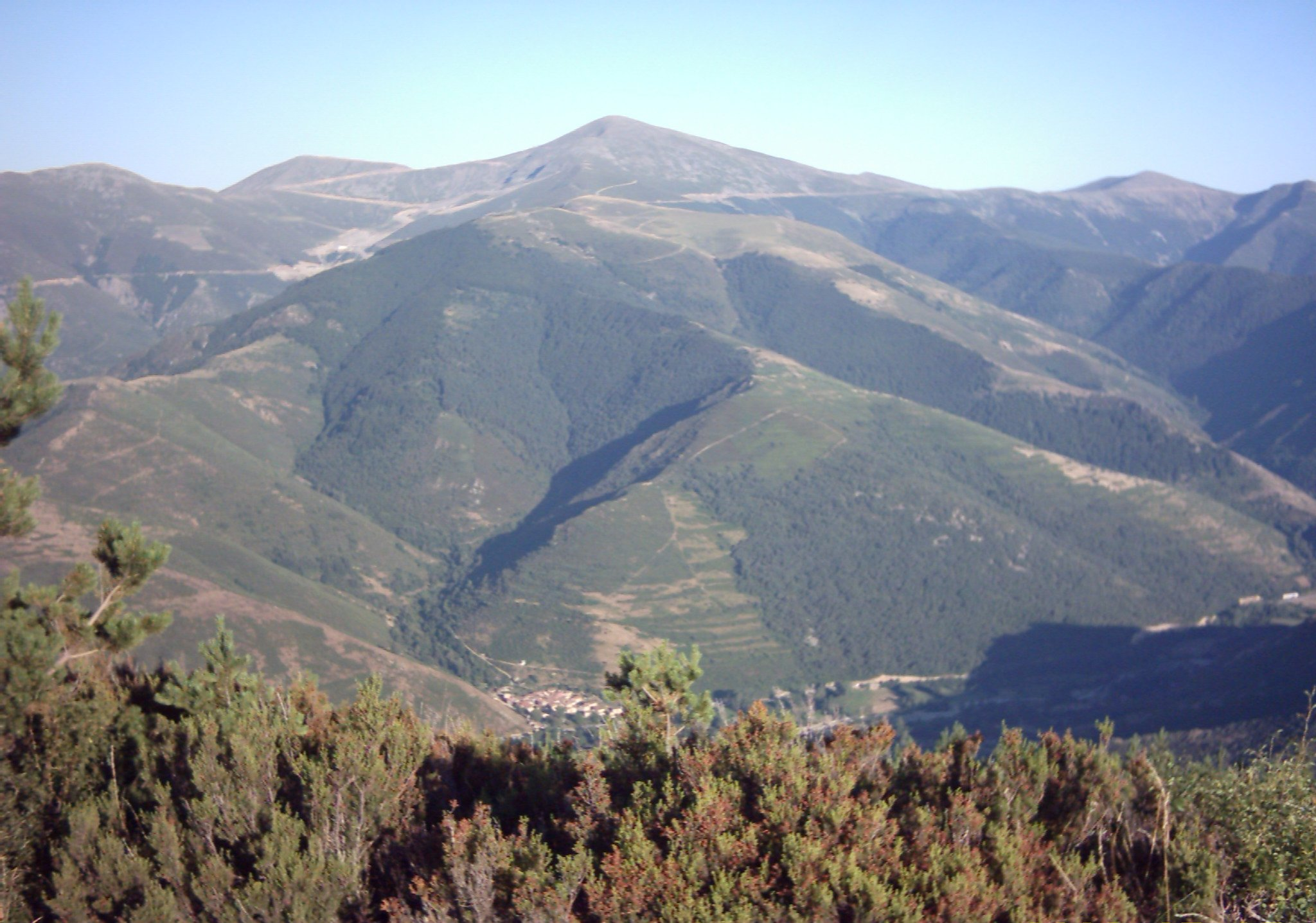
San Lorenzo, seen from El hombre

On the northern slopes of the mountain is located the ski resort of Valdezcaray.
