= Arlanzón (river) =

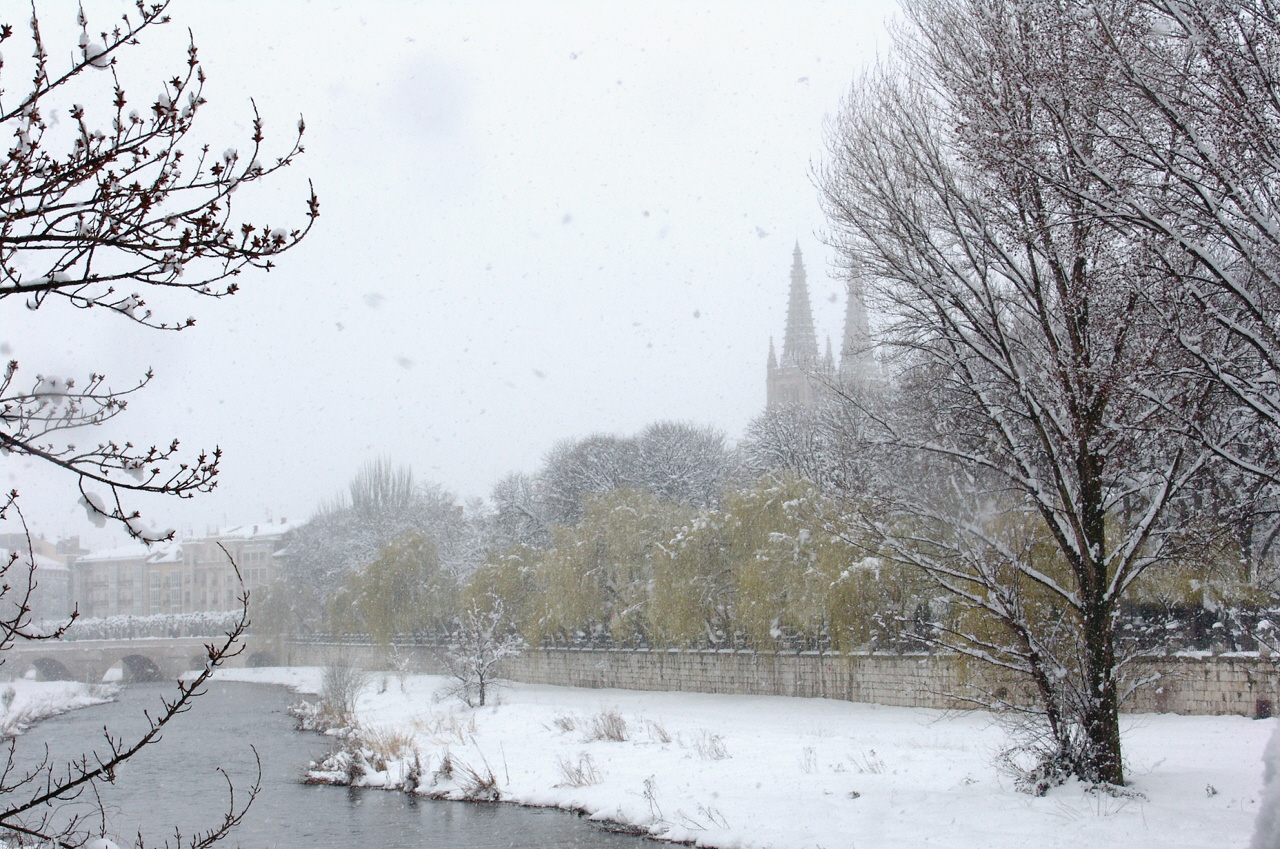
- The river at Burgos

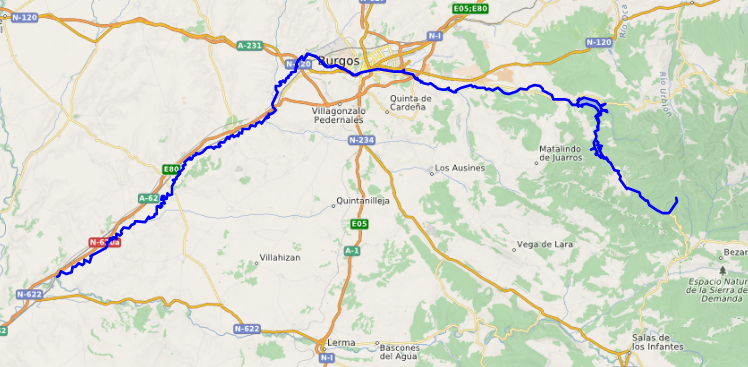
- Course of the Arlanzon.
- Native name: Río Arlanzón (Spanish)

Location
- Country: Spain
- Region: Castile and León

Physical characteristics
- Mouth: Arlanza
  - coordinates: 42°06′30″N 4°09′54″W
- Length: 131.11 km (81.47 mi)

Basin features
- Tributaries
  - left: Ausines
  - right: Vena, Ubierna and Úrbel

The River Arlanzón is a river in northern Spain. Its source is near the southern slope of the Pico San Millán in the Sierra de la Demanda in the Province of Burgos. It is a tributary of the River Arlanza, joining the latter river at Quintana del Puente in the Province of Palencia.

== Burgos ==
The river flows through the city of Burgos, although outside its medieval centre. The river was used by the local wool industry. Also, the city has long had riverside parks for recreational use. These parks include the Paseo del Espolón (created at the end of the 18th century) and the Paseo de la Isla (created at the beginning of the 19th century).

=== Ecological restoration ===
Spain has Basin Agencies which operate programmes to improve the ecological state and connectivity of rivers. In the case of the Arlanzón, the relevant agency is the one for the Douro, the Confederación Hidrográfica del Duero.

The health of the Burgos section of the river has been improved in the 21st century by works carried out to mitigate the effects of barriers such as weirs. Passes now allow fish such as trout to move freely.
