= Castrovido =

- Town
- Location in Spain
- Coordinates: 42.04°N 3.271°W
- Country: Spain
- Autonomous community: Castile and León
- Province: Burgos

Castrovido is a town in the province of Burgos, Castilla y Leon, Spain.
