= Santa Cruz del Valle Urbión =

Coordinates: 42°18′N 3°13′W

- Municipality and town
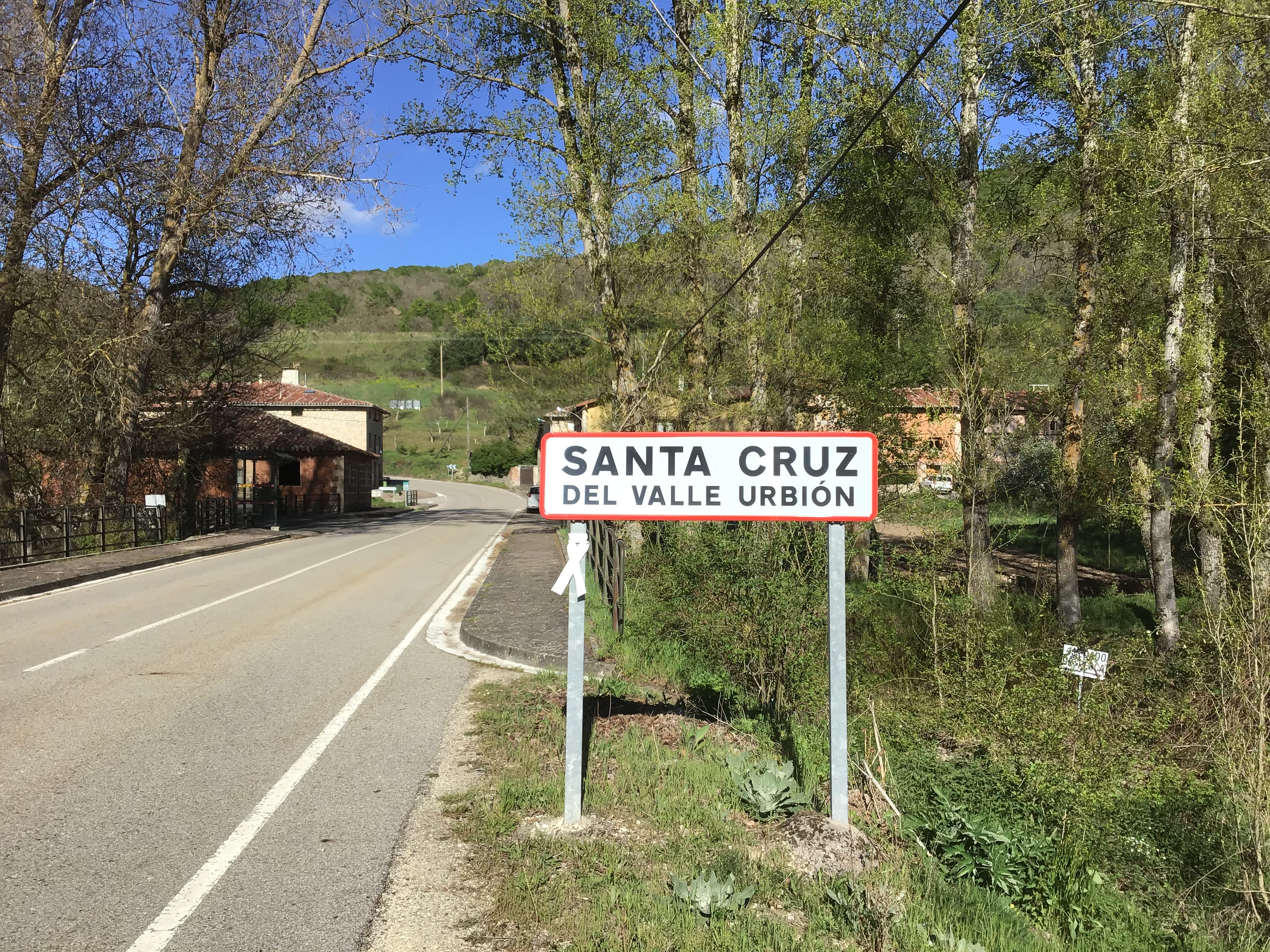

- Coat of arms
- Interactive map of Santa Cruz del Valle Urbión
- Country: Spain
- Autonomous community: Castile and León
- Province: Burgos
- Comarca: Montes de Oca

Area
  - Total: 33.92 km^{2} (13.10 sq mi)
- Elevation: 961 m (3,153 ft)

Population (2025-01-01)
  - Total: 94
  - Density: 2.8/km^{2} (7.2/sq mi)
- Time zone: UTC+1 (CET)
  - Summer (DST): UTC+2 (CEST)
- Postal code: 09268
- Website: http://www.santacruzdelvalleurbion.es/

Santa Cruz del Valle Urbión is a municipality and town located in the province of Burgos, Castile and León, Spain. According to the 2004 census (INE), the municipality has a population of 114 inhabitants.
