= Valdezcaray =

Ski resort in La Rioja, Spain

Coordinates: 42°15′N 2°58′W

- Interactive map of Valdezcaray
- Location: Iberian Mountains, Spain
- Nearest city: Ezcaray
- Top elevation: 2,125 m (6,972 ft)
- Base elevation: 1,530 m (5,020 ft)
- Skiable area: 22 km
- Trails: 22
- Lift system: 6 chair lifts. 1 ski tow.
- Website: http://www.valdezcaray.es

Valdezcaray is a ski area situated near the resort town of Ezcaray in the upper Oja Valley of the Sierra de la Demanda, Iberian System (province of La Rioja, Spain).

== The resort ==
It has 22 km of marked pistes, and is a growing family resort which has greatly improved its facilities in recent years. The highest point is at 2125 m near the summit of Mount San Lorenzo, with a vertical descent of 600 m.

The base of the area includes the basic ski services and is located at an altitude of 1530 m. From there, the main chair lift provides access to the pistes. All the hotels and apartments are in the resort town of Ezcaray, 13 km downhill from the ski area.

=== Lifts ===
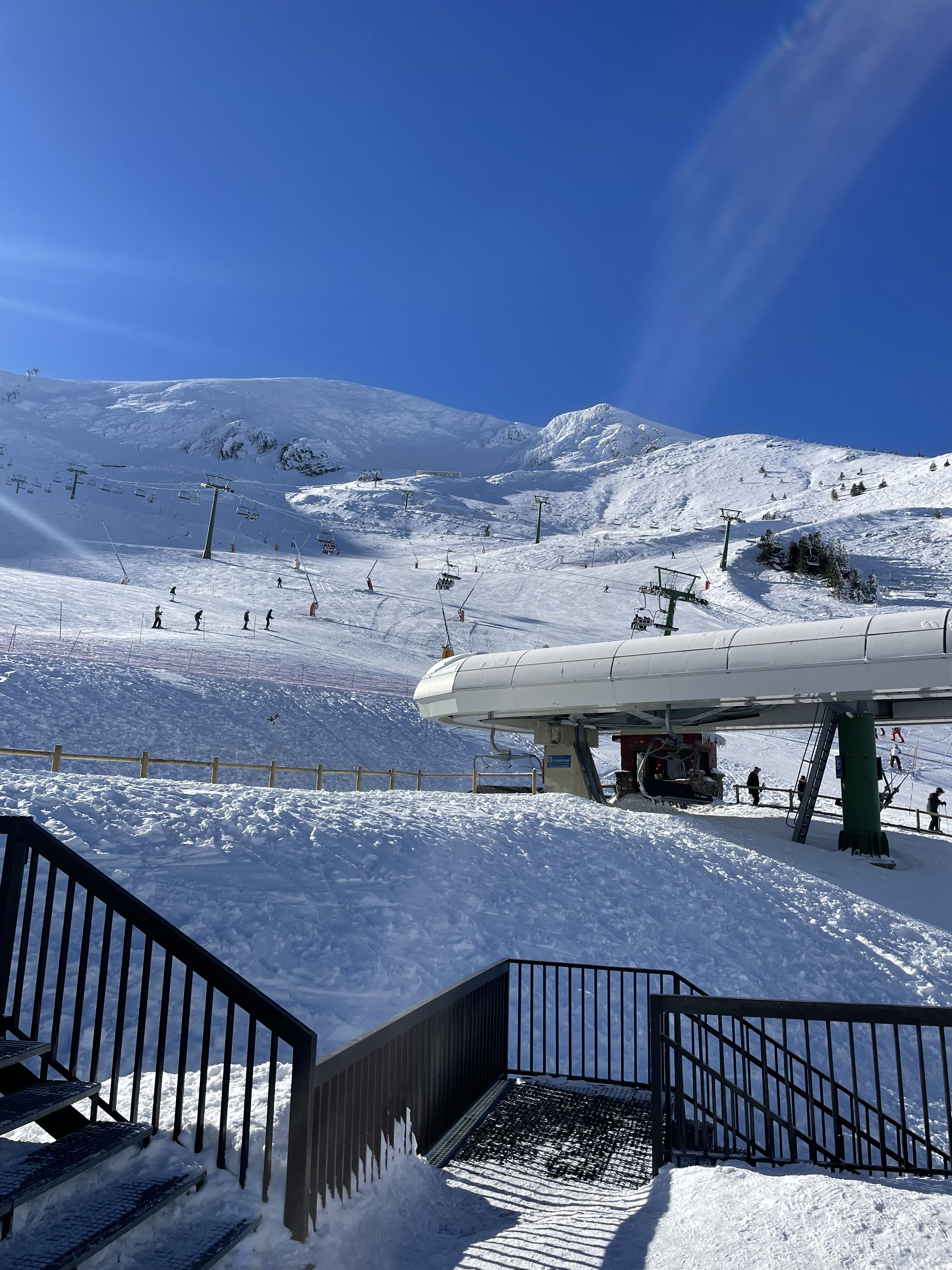
Valdezcaray Ski Resort with view of Mt St Lorenzo

Almost all of the resort's lifts are new and high capacity. The resort has:

- 6 chair lifts.
- 1 ski tow.

=== Pistes ===
The resort offers 24 pistes of different difficulties:

- 6 Beginner.
- 6 Easy.
- 10 Intermediate.
- 2 Expert.

=== Services ===
- 2 restaurants.
- 1 skiing school.
- 1 ski hiring store.

== See also ==
- Picos de Urbión
