= Cerrato =

Cerrato is a surname. Notable people with the surname include:

- Alba Cerrato (born 2007), Spanish footballer
- Elda Cerrato (born 1930), Argentine artist, and Professor at the Universidad de Buenos Aires
- Rodrigo de Cerrato (1259–1276), Castilian historian and hagiographer
- Vinny Cerrato, the former Executive Vice President for Football Operations for the Washington Redskins of the National Football League
