= Barbadillo de Herreros =

- Municipality and town
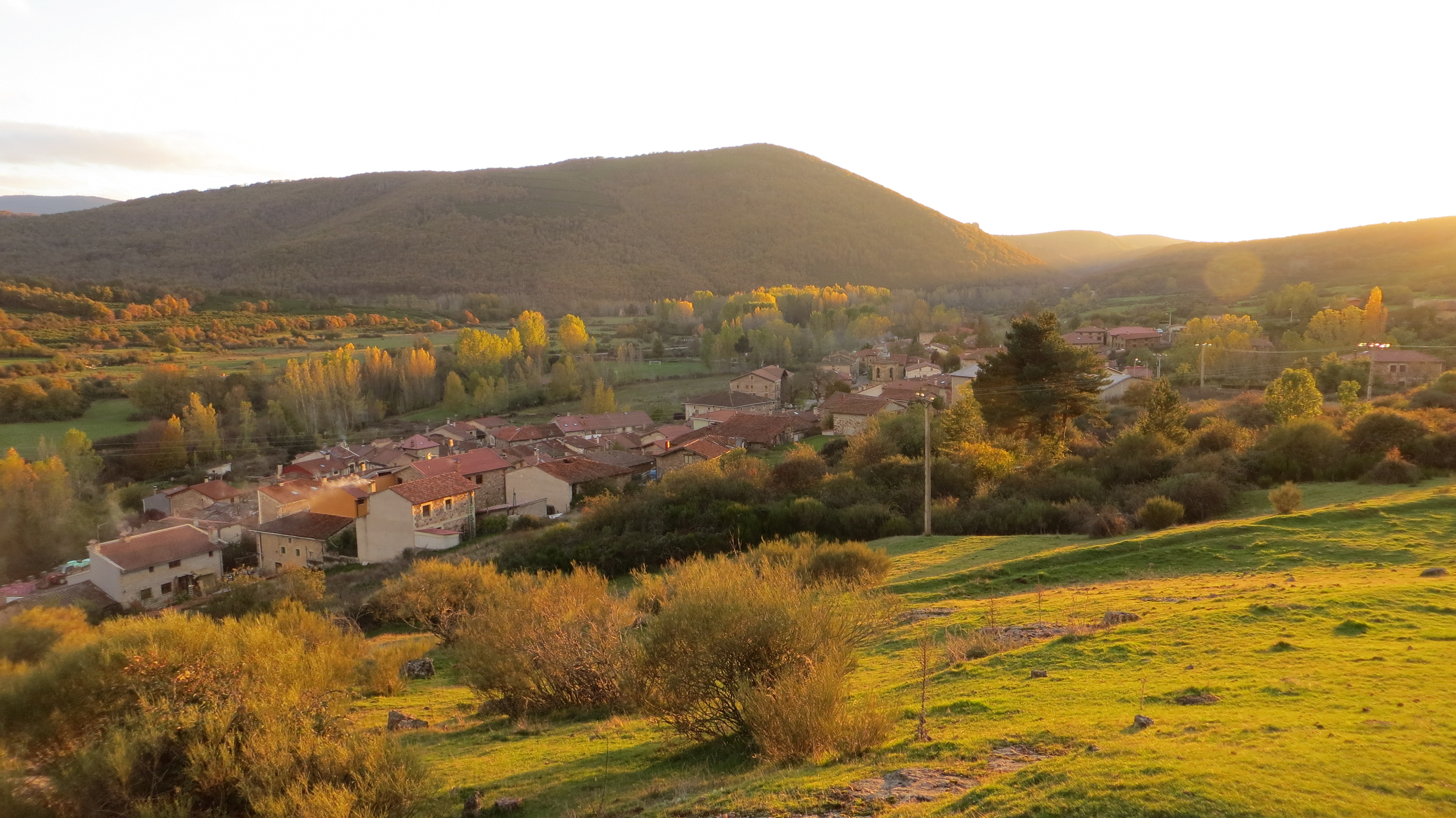

- Flag Coat of arms

- Location within Castile and León Location within Spain
- Coordinates: 42°09′N 3°10′W
- Country: Spain
- Autonomous community: Castile and León
- Province: Burgos
- Comarca: Sierra de la Demanda

Area
  - Total: 64.16 km^{2} (24.77 sq mi)
- Elevation: 1,495 m (4,905 ft)

Population (2025-01-01)
  - Total: 103
  - Density: 1.61/km^{2} (4.16/sq mi)
- Time zone: UTC+1 (CET)
  - Summer (DST): UTC+2 (CEST)
- Postal code: 09615
- Website: http://www.barbadillodeherreros.es/

Barbadillo de Herreros is a municipality located in the province of Burgos, Castile and León, Spain. The village is in the mountainous area known as the Sierra de la Demanda.

The village has been populated since the 10th century, having its peak in the early 20th century, where it reached 1000 inhabitants. It was then when the location was at full bloom, with a train line to transport iron from the surrounding mining operations, foundries and factories. The closure of its mines lead to a decline of population during the 20th century. According to the 2004 census (INE), the municipality had a population of 148 inhabitants.
