= Arlanza (DO) =

Coordinates: 42°1′35″N 3°45′32″W

Arlanza DOP
- Wine region
- Arlanza DOP in the provinces of Burgos and Palencia in the region of Castile and León
- Official name: D.O.P. Arlanza
- Type: Denominación de Origen Protegida (DOP)
- Year established: 2007
- Country: Spain
- Size of planted vineyards: 330 hectares (815 acres)
- No. of wineries: 23
- Wine produced: 1,351 hectolitres
- Comments: Data for 2016 / 2017

Arlanza is a Spanish Denominación de Origen Protegida (DOP) located in the provinces of Burgos and Palencia, Castile and León, Spain. It was officially upgraded from the lower status of QWPSR (VCPRD in Spanish) in 2007. The DOP covers 67 municipalities (54 in the province of Burgos and 13 in the province of Palencia). There are 23 wineries (bodegas) from Burgos registered and 2 from Palencia. The DOP takes its name from the river Arlanza which flows through it.

== History ==
The first written evidence of wine production in this area comes from the 12th century, when the monastery of Santa María de Bujedo de Juarros (es) purchased vineyards on the banks of the rivers Arlanza and Duero.

When the phylloxera virus devastated the vineyards of Europe at the end of the 19th century, almost all the vineyards in this area were uprooted and replanted by grafting onto American rootstock. By the 1920s the replanting had been completed.

== Climate ==
The climate is Continental, with long hot, dry summers and cold winters. In addition there is a sharp contrast between the daytime and night-time temperatures.

== Grapes ==
The authorized white varieties are Albillo and Viura while the authorized red varieties are Tempranillo / Tinta del País, Garnacha, Mencía, Cabernet Sauvignon, Merlot and Petit Verdot.

The minimum planting density is 2,000 vines/ha, whether planted as low individual vines (en vaso) or on trellises (en espaldera).

The maximum permitted yields are 10,000 kg/ha for white varieties, and 7,000 kg/ha for red varieties.
