= Quintana del Puente =

Coordinates: 42°05′03″N 4°12′25″W

- municipality
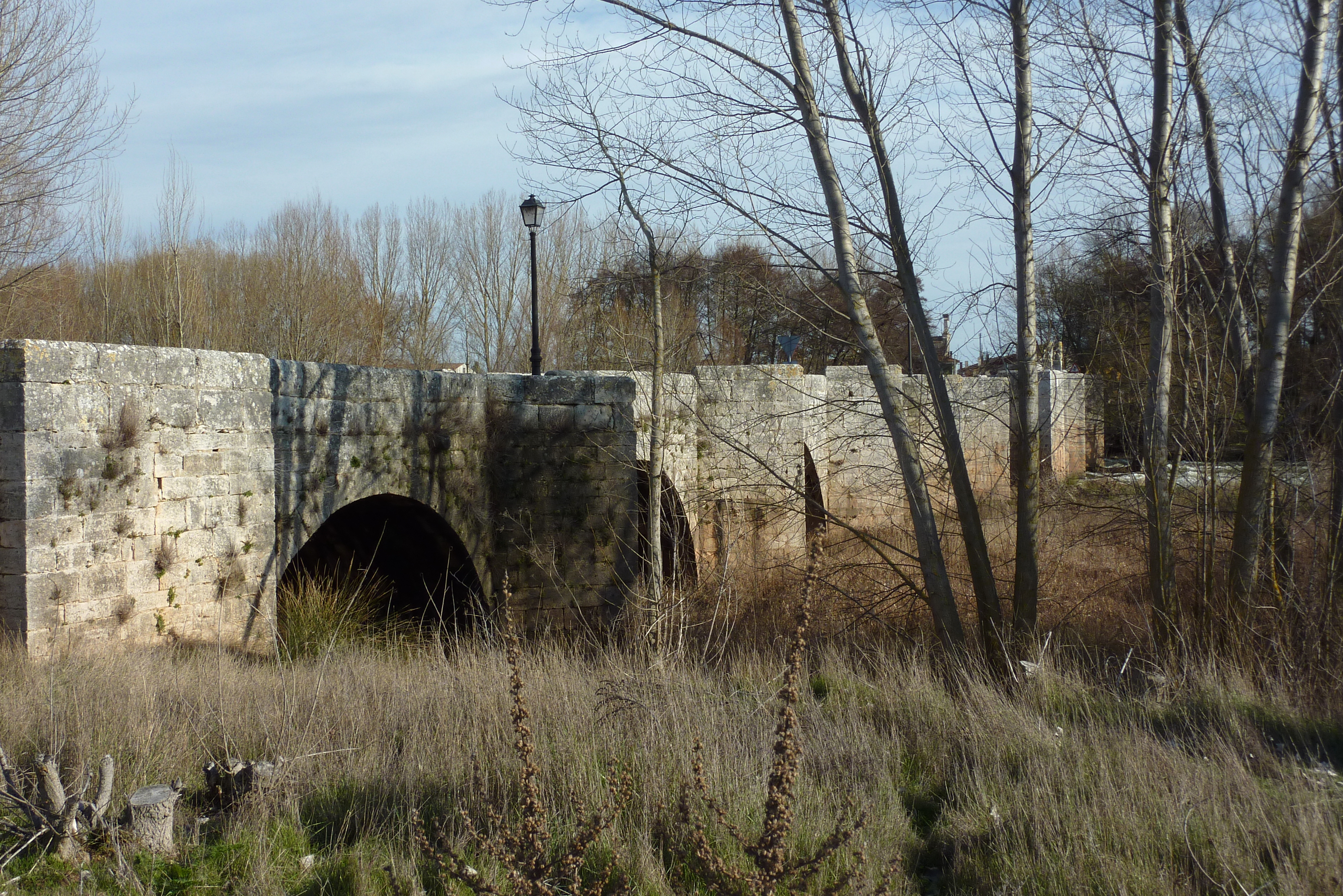

- Flag Coat of arms
- Interactive map of Quintana del Puente
- Country: Spain
- Autonomous community: Castile and León
- Province: Palencia

Area
  - Total: 11 km^{2} (4.2 sq mi)
- Elevation: 769 m (2,523 ft)

Population (2025-01-01)
  - Total: 248
  - Density: 23/km^{2} (58/sq mi)
- Time zone: UTC+1 (CET)
  - Summer (DST): UTC+2 (CEST)
- Website: Official website

Quintana del Puente is a municipality located in the province of Palencia, Castile and León, Spain. According to the 2004 census (INE), the municipality had a population of 247 inhabitants.
