= Monterrubio de la Demanda =

Coordinates: 42°09′N 3°07′W

- Municipality
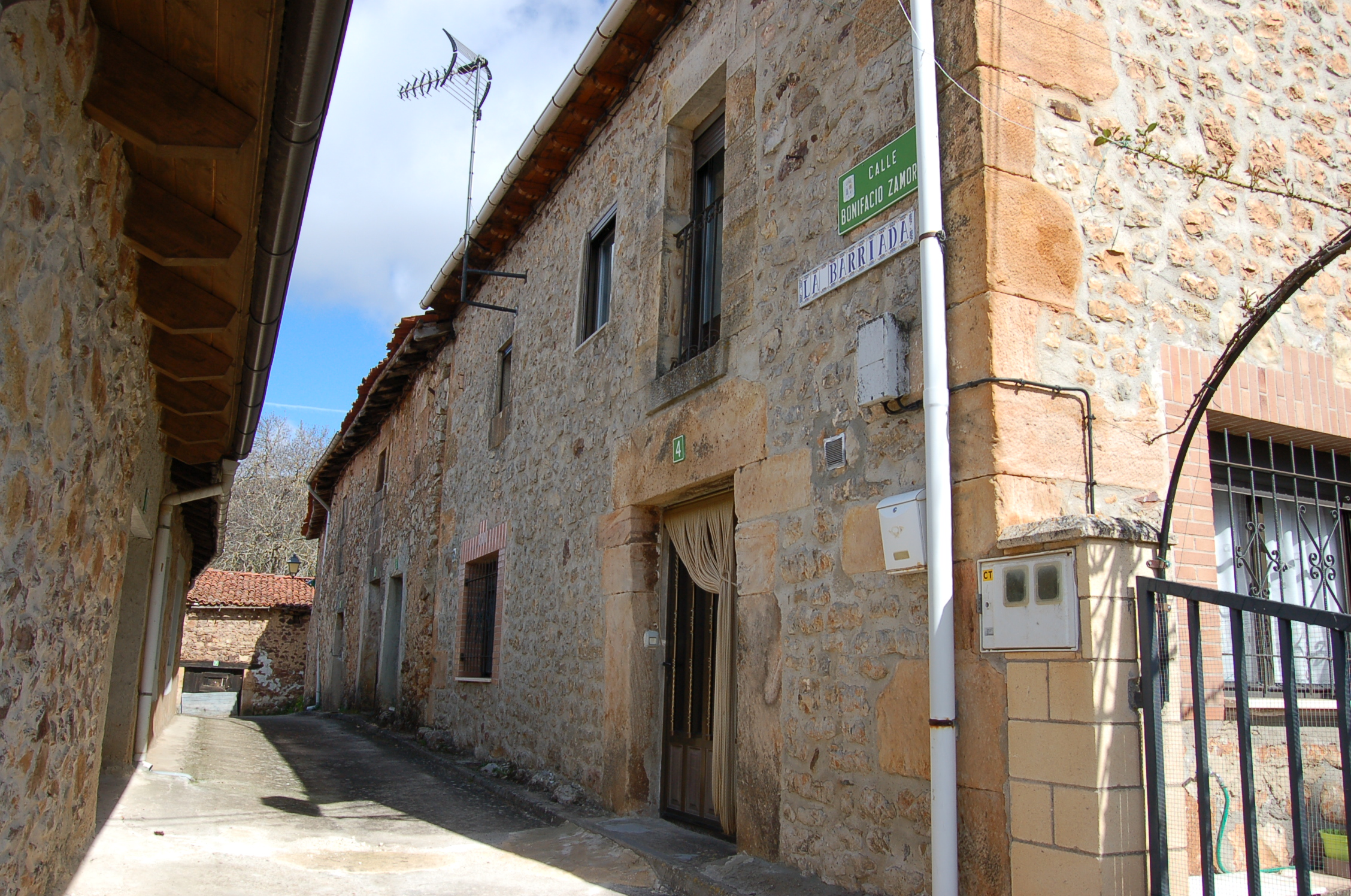
- Bonifacio Zamora Street in Monterrubio de la Demanda

- Flag Coat of arms
- Nickname: Monterrubio
- Interactive map of Monterrubio de la Demanda
- Country: Spain
- Autonomous community: Castile and León
- Province: Burgos
- Comarca: Sierra de la Demanda

Area
  - Total: 15.11 km^{2} (5.83 sq mi)
- Elevation: 1,210 m (3,970 ft)

Population (2025-01-01)
  - Total: 55
  - Density: 3.6/km^{2} (9.4/sq mi)
- Time zone: UTC+1 (CET)
  - Summer (DST): UTC+2 (CEST)
- Postal code: 09615
- Website: http://www.monterrubiodelademanda.es/

Monterrubio de la Demanda is a municipality and village located in the province of Burgos, Castile and León, Spain. According to the 2025 census (INE), the municipality had a population of 55 inhabitants.

== Demography ==
According to the 2004 census (INE), the municipality had a population of 100 inhabitants. By 2018 the population had declined to 59. By 2025 the population had declined to 55 inhabitants.
