= Pineda de la Sierra =

Coordinates: 42°13′N 3°18′W

- Municipality and town
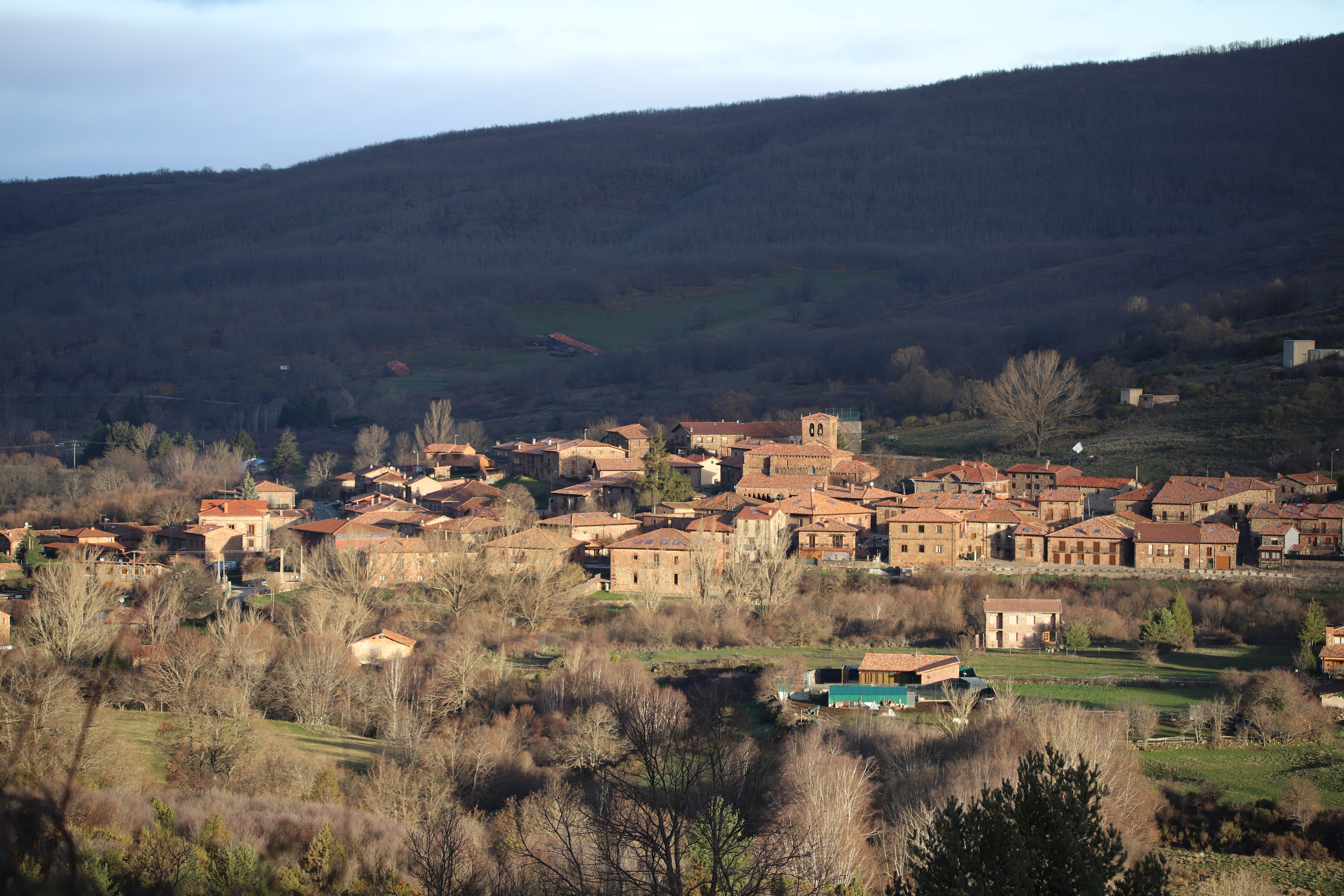
- Pineda de la Sierra Landscape

- Coat of arms
- Interactive map of Pineda de la Sierra
- Country: Spain
- Autonomous community: Castile and León
- Province: Burgos
- Comarca: Sierra de la Demanda

Area
  - Total: 68 km^{2} (26 sq mi)
- Elevation: 1,199 m (3,934 ft)

Population (2025-01-01)
  - Total: 92
  - Density: 1.4/km^{2} (3.5/sq mi)
- Time zone: UTC+1 (CET)
  - Summer (DST): UTC+2 (CEST)
- Postal code: 09199
- Website: http://www.pinedadelasierra.es/

Pineda de la Sierra is a municipality and town located in the province of Burgos, Castile and León, Spain. According to the 2004 census (INE), the municipality has a population of 127.
