= Sierra de la Demanda =

Mountain Range

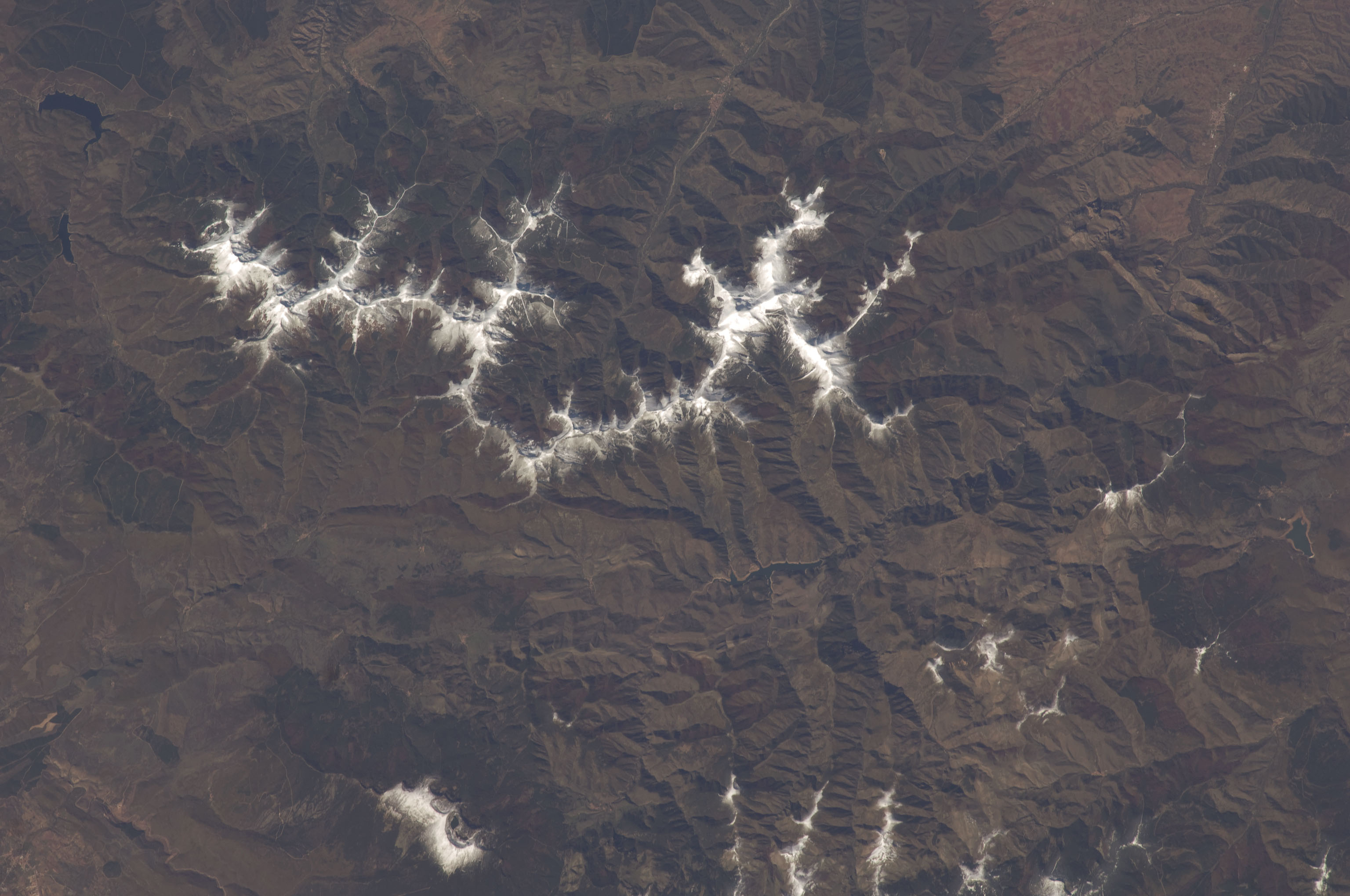
- View of the Sierra de la Demanda taken during ISS Expedition 17.

Highest point
- Elevation: 2,270 m (7,450 ft)
- Coordinates: 42.1135°N 3.1256°W

Geography
- Location: Castile and León, La Rioja (Spain), Spain
- Parent range: Sistema Ibérico

Sierra de la Demanda is a mountain sub-range situated in the northern Iberian Peninsula.

The Sierra de la Demanda area provides the habitat for Lissotriton helveticus punctillatus (Schmidtler 1970), a subspecies of the palmate newt.

== Geography ==
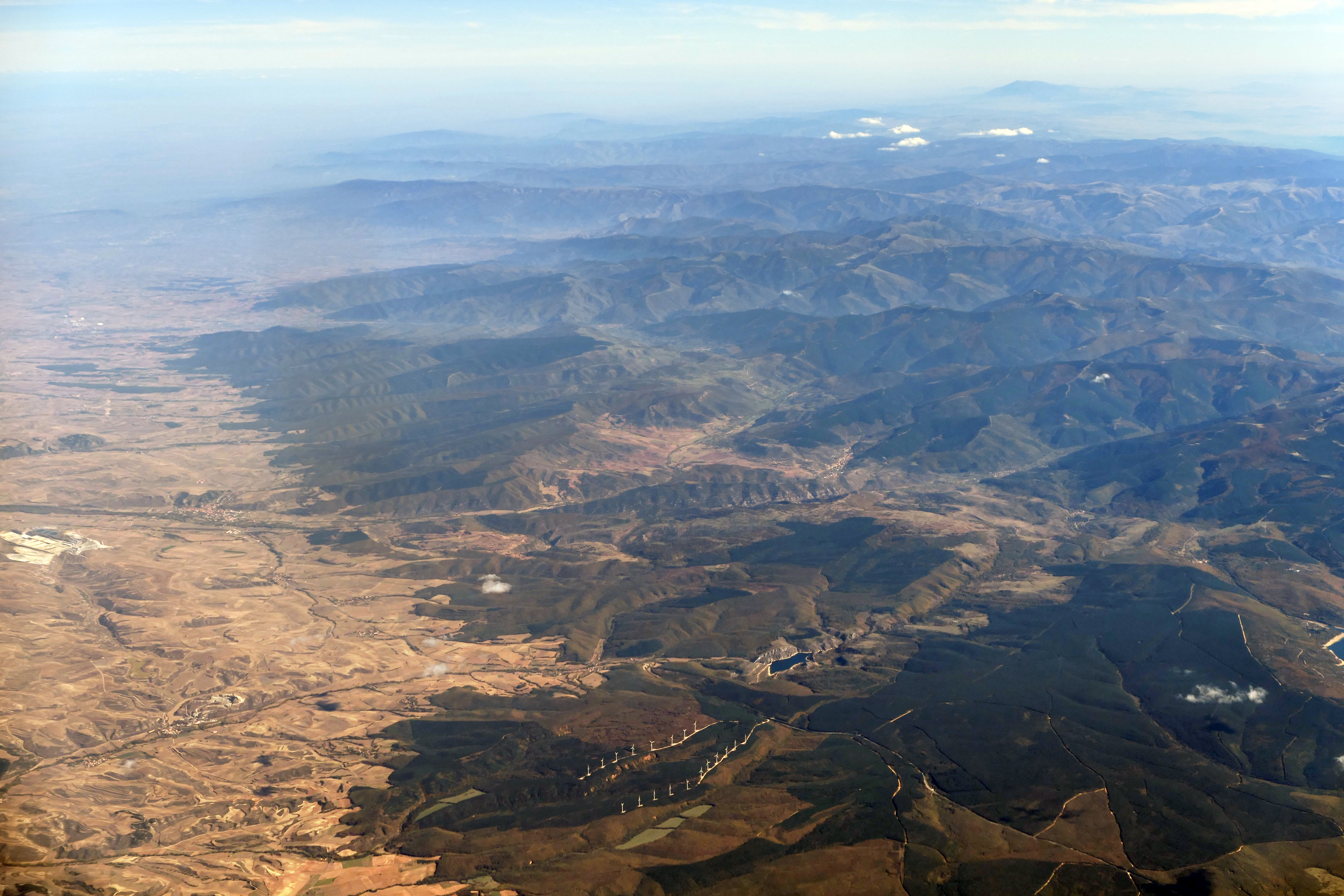
Northern edge of the Sierra where it meets the Meseta Central.

The Sierra de la Demanda is part of the western section of the larger Sistema Ibérico. The sub-range runs through the eastern province of Burgos and western La Rioja, bordering on the Meseta Central in Spain.

- Monte San Lorenzo (2270 m), highest peak of the sub-range.
- Pico San Millán (2131 m), second highest peak of the sub-range. (Note: Third, if counting Bagolrrucia)

The highest peaks of the range are usually covered in snow between October and May every year. Valdezcaray ski resort is located in the Sierra de la Demanda. The Picos de Urbión are located south of this range.

== See also ==
- Geography of Spain
- Valdezcaray, a sky resort.
- Sierra de la Demanda (comarca), shire.
- Montes de Oca, eastern shire.
- Alarcia, a typical town.
- Demandasaurus, an extinct local dinosaurus.
