= Lara de los Infantes =

Coordinates: 42°07′N 3°27′W

- town
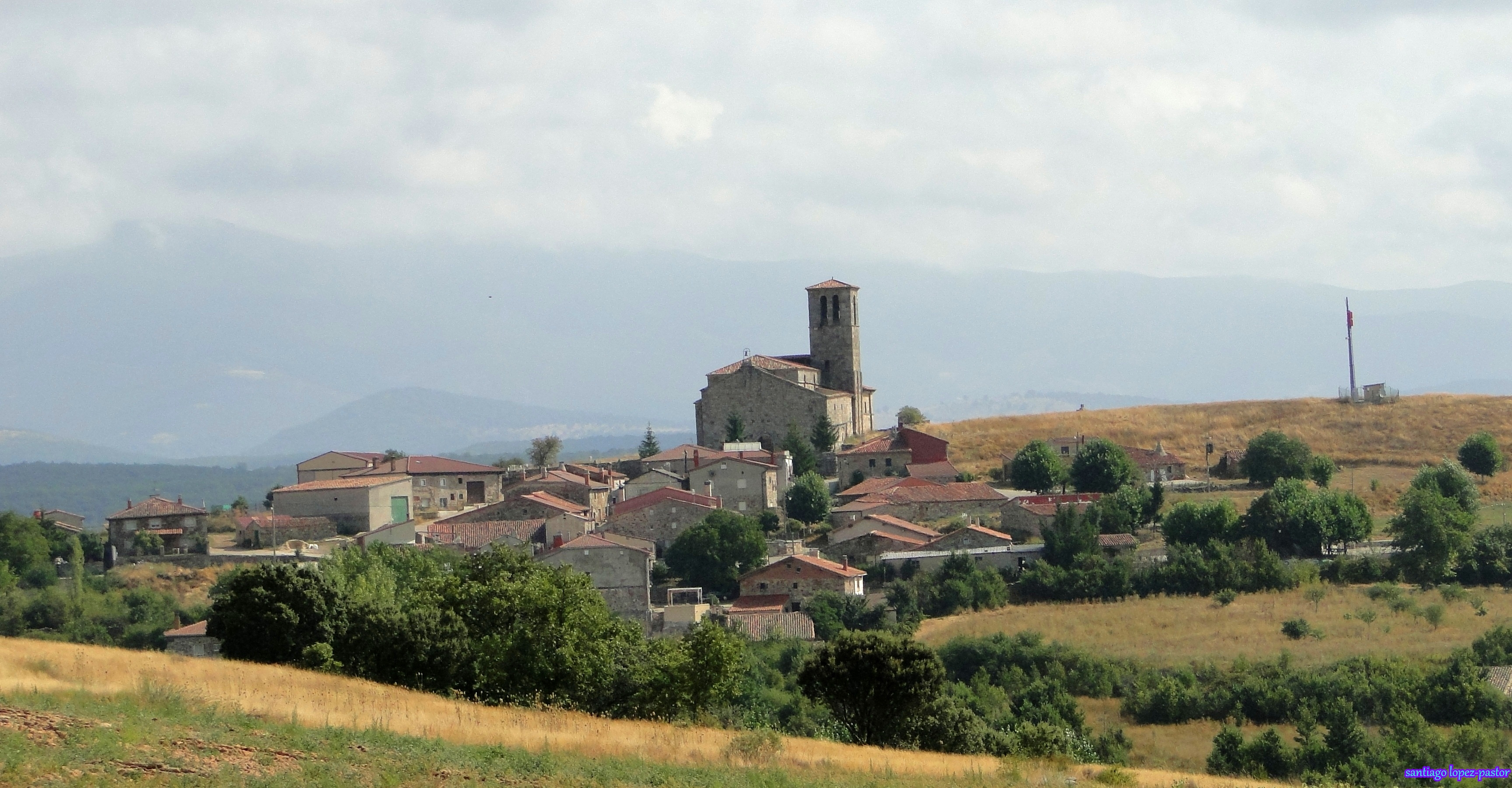
- Interactive map of Lara de los Infantes
- Country: Spain
- Autonomous community: Castile and León
- Province: Burgos
- Comarca: Sierra de la Demanda
- Municipality: Jurisdicción de Lara

Population (2023)
  - Total: 27

Lara de los Infantes is a town with 27 inhabitants in the province of Burgos in the autonomous region of Castille y León in Spain.

It is the seat of the municipality of Jurisdicción de Lara, which includes a few more inhabitants as it includes other localities like Paúles de Lara, and Aceña de Lara. It is situated in the shire of Sierra de la Demanda 45 kilometers from the city of Burgos.

Although sparsely populated today, the area was important in Roman times. In the Middle Ages, it formed part of the Alfoz of Lara, where the Lara family had its hereditary base, and its full name, Lara de los Infante (Lara of the Princes) reflects that family's legend, told in the Cantar de los Siete Infantes de Lara.
