= Chant Noël: Chants for the Holiday Season =

Compilation album by Benedictine monks of Santo Domingo De Silos
- Released: 1 November 1994.
- Recorded: 1980–1981
- Genre: Plainsong
- Length: 42:11
- Label: Angel Records
- Producer: Maria Francisca Bonmati

Benedictine monks of Santo Domingo De Silos chronology
Chant (1994)	Chant Noël: Chants for the Holiday Season (1994)	Chant II (1995)

Chant Noël: Chants for the Holiday Season is a compilation album of plainsong sung in Latin by the Benedictine monks of Santo Domingo De Silos under the direction of Francisco Lara. It was released in November 1994 by Angel Records, following the success of Chant which had been released earlier the same year. As well as a number of items sung at Christmas, the album features Ubi Caritas, which is associated with Easter.

The music on the album was recorded between 1980 and 1981. The record reached number three on the Billboard Top Classical Albums chart and number 78 on the Billboard 200.

== Track listing ==
1. Viderunt Omnes; Gradual (Modo V) 3:44
2. Jucundare filia Sion; Antiphon with Psalm (Modo VIII) 2:52
3. De ore leonis; Short Responsory 1:48
4. Tui sunt caeli; Offertory (Modo IV) 1:50
5. Viderunt Omnes; Communion (Modo I) 2:19
6. Zelus domus tuae; Antiphon (Modo VIII) 0:28
7. Verbum caro factum est; Short Responsory 1:48
8. Hodie Christus natus est; Antiphon (Modo I) 1:00
9. Qui manducat; Communion (Modo I) 2:07
10. Gloria, laus et honor; Processional Hymn (Modo I) 3:25
11. Hodie nobis caelorum Rex; Responsory (Modo V) 4:45
12. Hodie nobis de caelo; Responsory (Modo VIII) 2:24
13. In principio; Responsory (Modo VII) 2:33
14. Super flumina Babylonis; Offertory (Modo I) 1:41
15. Ubi caritas; Antiphon for Maundy Thursday (Modo VIII) 3:00
16. Gloria in excelsis Deo; Antiphon (Modus VIII) 0:31
17. Alleluia. Domine in virtute tua; Alleluia (Modo VI) 3:41
18. Respice, Domine; Gradual (Modo V) 4:40
19. Alleluia. Oportebat; Alleluia (Modo IV) 3:39
20. Rorate caeli desuper; Introit (Modo I) 2:09
21. Pueri Hebraeorum; Antiphon (Modo I) 2:08
