= Chant II =

Studio album by Benedictine monks of Santo Domingo de Silos
- Released: October 17, 1995
- Recorded: June 21, 1972
- Genre: Gregorian chant
- Label: Angel
- Producer: Maria Francisca Bonmati

Benedictine monks of Santo Domingo de Silos chronology
Chant Noël: Chants for the Holiday Season (1994)	Chant II (1995)	Chant III (1996)

Chant II is a 1995 album of Gregorian chant, performed by the Benedictine monks of Santo Domingo de Silos in Burgos, Spain. It was released as a follow-up to the best-selling 1994 album Chant. Like the first album, it included material which had been recorded by the monks some years previously.

== Lyrics ==
Some of the texts, such as the gradual Haec Dies, are from the Easter liturgy.

== Performers ==
The monks of Santo Domingo de Silos have been singing Gregorian chant since the 11th century (before that, they used Mozarabic chant). In the nineteenth century the French monks of Solesmes Abbey played a part in the reestablishment of Santo Domingo de Silos after the Ecclesiastical Confiscations of Mendizábal. The Solesmes style of singing plainsong has influenced the Spanish monks.

== Reception ==
Professional ratings
Review scores
Source	Rating
AllMusic	4/5 stars

Reviewers had expressed surprise at the success of the first album. Not only had Gregorian chant been a specialist market for record companies before the 1980s, but also other choirs were probably technically better in this repertoire (for example the monks of Solesmes issued some notable recordings in the 1960s). However, by the time Chant II was released the monks of Silos had eclipsed their rivals in terms of sales.

According to AllMusic, Chant II was recorded in the Teatro Real, Madrid. The same source gave Chant II a poorer rating than the first album, because of inferior sound quality.

== Related albums ==
Chant II was not the first follow-up to Chant, as Chant Noël: Chants For The Holiday Season was released 1 November 1994. Chant II was followed by Chant III on 17 September 1996, which itself was followed by Chant IV - The Millenium in 1997 as performed by Schola Cantorum of Cologne.

In 2004, Chant was re-issued along with Chant II as Chant: The Anniversary Edition by Angel/EMI Classics.

== Track listing ==
1. "Da Pacem, Domine": Introit
2. "Haec dies quam fecit Dominus": Gradual
3. "Victimae paschali laudes": Sequence
4. "Alleluia. Vir Dei Benedictus": Alleluia
5. "Kyrie, Fons Bonitatis": Trope
6. "Quam magnificata sunt opera tua Domine": Responsory
7. "Ut Queant Laxis Resonare Fibris": Hymn in honour of St John the Baptist
8. "Cibavit Eos Ex Adipe Furmenti": Introit
9. "Oculi Omnium In Te Sperant": Gradual
10. "Spiritus Domini replevit orbem terrarum": Introit
11. "Alleluia. Veni Sancte Spiritus: Alleluia"
12. "Os Justi Meditabitur Sapientiam": Gradual
13. Kyrie "Lux Et Origo"
14. "Gloria In Excelsis Deo"
15. "Sanctus Dominus Deus Sabaoth"
16. "Agnus Dei, Qui Tollis Peccata Mundi"
17. "Ave Mundi Spes Maria": Sequence
18. "Media Vita In Morte Sumus": Responsory
19. "Salve, Regina, Mater Misericordiae": Antiphon

== Personnel ==
- Jay Barbieri, Art Direction
- Angel Barco, Engineer
- Maria Francisca Bonmati, Producer
- Ismael Fernández de la Cuesta, Conductor
- David Foil, Liner Notes
- Ted Jensen, Mastering
- Marvin Mattelson, Cover Design, Cover Art
