= Ismael Fernández de la Cuesta =

Spanish singer (born 1939)

Ismael Fernández de la Cuesta (born 1939) is a Spanish vocalist and musicologist specialising in Gregorian chant.

Fernández de la Cuesta was born in the village of Neila, Burgos, Spain. He entered the Abbey of Santo Domingo de Silos at a young age. After a period of study in France, he returned to direct the abbey choir from 1962 to 1973, when he left monastic life. He was subsequently on the staff of the Madrid Royal Conservatory, where he taught Gregorian Chant until his retirement.

== Publications ==
He has published extensively on subjects related to medieval music.

== Recordings ==
He has made recordings of Gregorian chant, notably Chant, the best-selling classical record of 1994, which features the monks of Santo Domingo de Silos.

He directed performances of Mozarabic chant with the Santo Domingo de Silos choir in a 1970 recording. Although the monks usually sing Gregorian chant, the Mozarabic rite is sometimes used in Spain to this day.

== Awards ==
He is a recipient of the Civil Order of Alfonso X, the Wise.

== See also ==
- Chant (Benedictine Monks of Santo Domingo de Silos album)
