= Arauzo de Salce =

- Municipality and town
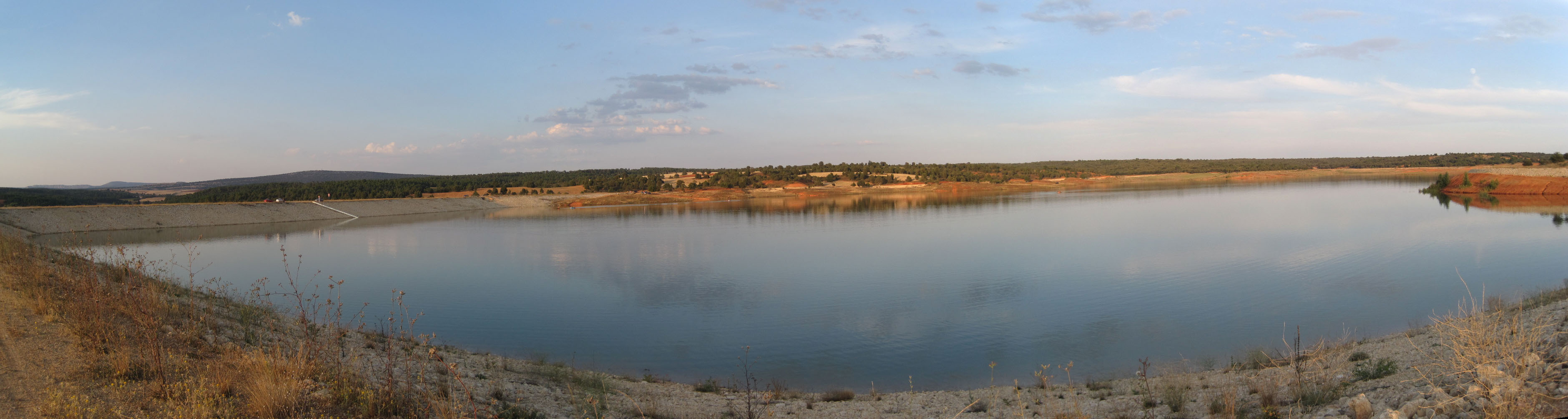

- Flag Coat of arms

- Location within Castile and León Location within Spain
- Coordinates: 41°49′N 3°24′W
- Country: Spain
- Autonomous community: Castile and León
- Province: Burgos
- Comarca: Sierra de la Demanda

Area
  - Total: 18.50 km^{2} (7.14 sq mi)
- Elevation: 957 m (3,140 ft)

Population (2025-01-01)
  - Total: 44
  - Density: 2.4/km^{2} (6.2/sq mi)
- Time zone: UTC+1 (CET)
  - Summer (DST): UTC+2 (CEST)
- Postal code: 09451
- Website: http://www.arauzodesalce.es/

Arauzo de Salce is a municipality and town located in the province of Burgos, Castile and León, Spain. According to the 2005 census (INE), the municipality has a population of 93 inhabitants.
