= La Revilla y Ahedo =

Coordinates: 42°01′00″N 3°20′00″W

- municipality
- Coat of arms
- Interactive map of La Revilla y Ahedo
- Country: Spain
- Autonomous community: Castile and León
- Province: Burgos
- Comarca: Sierra de la Demanda
- Seat: La Revilla

Area
  - Total: 15 km^{2} (5.8 sq mi)
- Elevation: 943 m (3,094 ft)

Population (2025-01-01)
  - Total: 97
  - Density: 6.5/km^{2} (17/sq mi)
- Time zone: UTC+1 (CET)
  - Summer (DST): UTC+2 (CEST)
- Postal code: 09613
- Website: http://www.larevillayahedo.es/

La Revilla y Ahedo is a municipality located in the province of Burgos, Castile and León, Spain. According to the 2004 census (INE), the municipality has a population of 125.

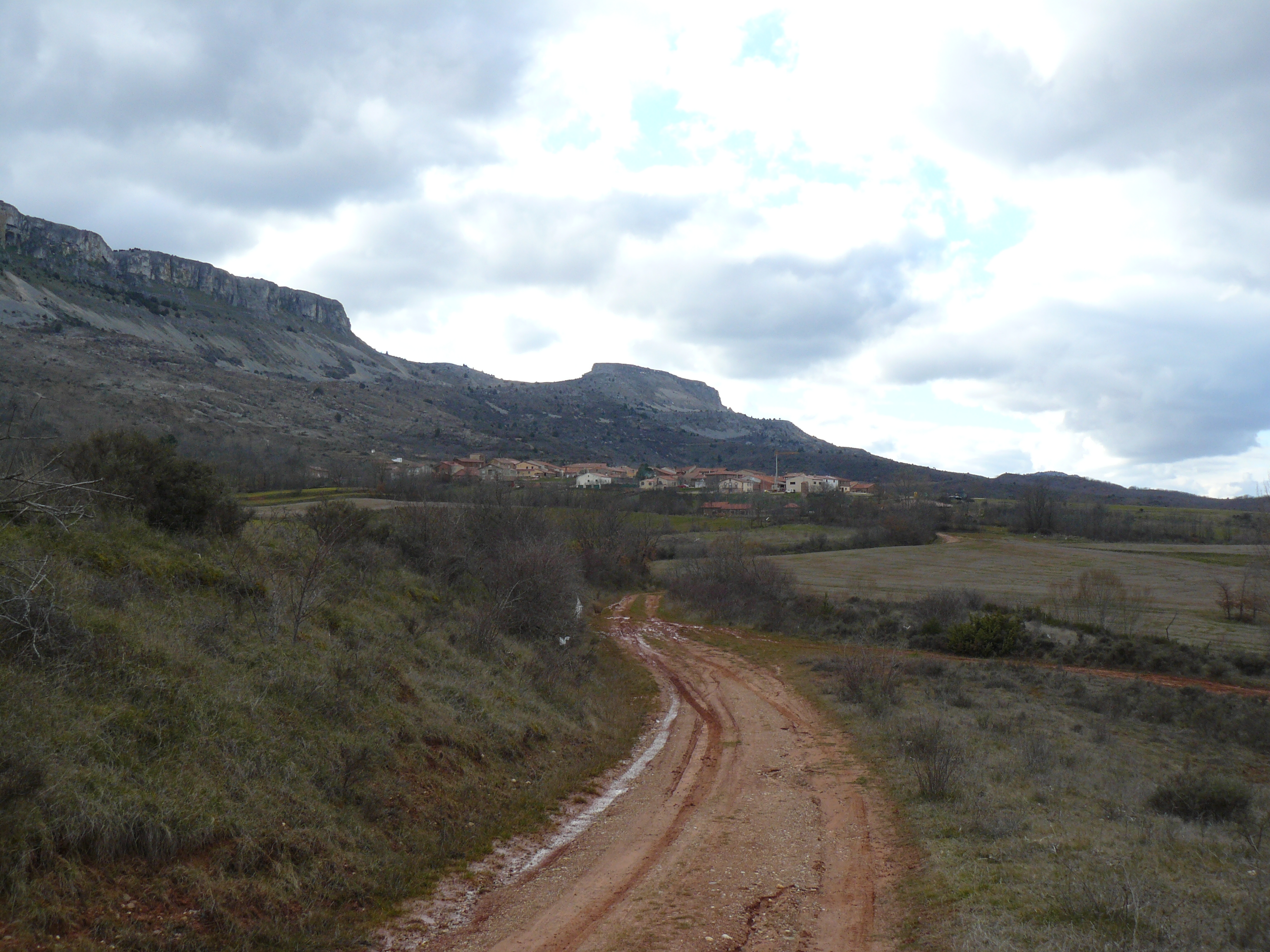
View of Ahedo, municipality of La Revilla and Ahedo, Burgos
