= Chant (Benedictine Monks of Santo Domingo de Silos album) =

Compilation album by The Benedictine monks of Santo Domingo de Silos
- Released: March 15, 1994
- Recorded: 1972–1982
- Genre: Gregorian chant
- Length: 58:26
- Label: Angel
- Producer: Maria Francisca Bonmati

The Benedictine monks of Santo Domingo de Silos chronology
Chant (1994)	Chant Noël: Chants for the Holiday Season (1994)

Chant is a compilation album of Gregorian chant, performed by The Benedictine Monks of Santo Domingo de Silos in Spain.

The performances were recorded perhaps as early as the 1970s, either in the province of Burgos or in Madrid, the Spanish capital. The music did not sell significantly until it was re-released by Angel Records in 1994 when it was marketed as an antidote to the stress of modern life. Chant is the best-selling album of Gregorian chant ever released. It peaked at No. 3 on the Billboard 200 music chart, and was certified as double platinum, meaning two million copies were sold in the United States and four million worldwide.

== Performers ==
The monks of Santo Domingo de Silos have been singing Gregorian chant since the 11th century (before that, they used Mozarabic chant). There was a break in the tradition in the 1830s when the abbey was closed by the government as part of the so-called Ecclesiastical Confiscations of Mendizábal. The abbey was reestablished with the help of monks from Solesmes Abbey in France. Solesmes is known for its commitment to plainsong and the Solesmes style of singing has influenced the monks of Santo Domingo de Silos, although the monks' pronunciation of Latin reflects their Spanish background.

Sources agree that the music on Chant had been recorded some years before it achieved worldwide fame. However, the exact dates appear to be elusive. According to the records posted on the Gregorian Association site, Chant consists of recordings made 1972-1982. Blair Sanderson suggests that a seminary in the Spanish city of Logroño invited the monks to record a vinyl album of chant in order to popularize it among churchgoers, and that most of the music was recorded around 1980, while there is a greater proportion of music recorded in the 1970s in the follow-up album Chant II.

== Reception ==
Professional ratings
Review scores
Source	Rating
Allmusic	4.5/5 stars

Reviewers expressed surprise at the commercial success of the album. Not only had Gregorian chant been regarded as a specialist market by record companies, but also other monastic choirs, such as that of Solesmes Abbey, had enjoyed a higher profile as recording artists than the Silos monks. However, there had already been evidence that Gregorian chant could break through to a mass market with the success in the classical charts of the 1982 album A Feather on the Breath of God and in the pop charts the project Enigma in 1990/91, specifically the single "Sadeness (Part I)".

The monks normally follow a routine based on their monastic duties. However, following the commercial success of Chant, they made publicity appearances and were interviewed on The Tonight Show and Good Morning America.

== Sequel albums ==
Chant Noël: Chants For The Holiday Season was released 1 November 1994, with Chant II released 17 October 1995 and Chant III on 17 September 1996.

In 1998, Chant was reissued as a gold-audiophile CD by Mobile Fidelity Sound Lab. In 2004, it was re-issued along with its follow-up, Chant II as Chant: The Anniversary Edition by Angel/EMI Classics.

The album was spoofed by members of the comedy rock band Big Daddy, performing as the Benzedrine Monks of Santa Domonica, in their album Chantmania, which included Gregorian-inspired versions of notable pop songs. Sandra Boynton also produced a book and CD entitled Grunt: Pigorian Chant from Snouto Domoinko de Silo.

Ravi Shankar claimed that his album of Indian chants, Chants of India (1997), was conceived when Angel were looking to repeat the commercial success of Chant.

== Track listing ==
1. "Puer Natus Est Nobis": Introit (Mode VII) – 3:36
2. "Os Iusti": Gradual (Mode I) – 2:49
3. "Christus Factus Est Pro Nobis": Gradual (Mode V) – 2:39
4. "Mandatum Novum Do Vobis": Antiphonal And Psalm 132 (Mode III) – 1:41
5. "Media Vita In Morte Sumus": Responsorio (Mode IV) – 6:11
6. "Alleluia, Beatus Vir Qui Suffert": Alleluia (Mode I) – 3:10
7. "Spiritus Domini": Introit (Mode VIII) – 3:46
8. "Improperium": Offertorio (Mode VIII) – 2:36
9. "Laetatus Sum": Gradual (Mode VII) – 2:17
10. "Kyrie XI A": Kyrie (Mode I) – 1:06
11. "Puer Natus In Bethlehem": Ritmo (Mode I) – 1:58
12. "Jacta Cogitatum Tuum": Gradual (Mode VII) – 3:34
13. "Verbum Caro Factum Est": Responsorio (Mode VII) – 4:04
14. "Genuit Puerpera Regem": Antiphonal And Psalm 99 (Mode II) – 2:56
15. "Occuli Omnium": Gradual (Mode VII) – 3:21
16. "Ave Mundi Spes Maria": Sequenza (Mode I) – 4:18
17. "Kyrie Fons Bonitatis": Trope (Mode III) – 4:00
18. "Veni Sancte Spiritus": Sequenza (Mode I) – 2:42
19. "Hosanna Filio David": Antiphonal (Mode VII) – 0:42

== Personnel ==
- Jay Barbieri – art direction
- Angel Barco – original engineer
- Maria Francisca Bonmati – original producer
- Ismael Fernández de la Cuesta – music direction
- Robert LaPorta – compilation producer
- David Foil – liner notes
- Richard Price / Ted Jensen – mastering
- Francisco Lara – music direction
- Marvin Mattelson – cover design, cover art
- Aimee Gautreau – marketing

== Charts ==
Chart performance for Chant
Chart (1994)	Peak position
Australian Albums (ARIA)	11
US Billboard 200	3

== Certifications and sales ==
Sales and certifications for Chant
Region	Certification	Certified units/sales
Canada (Music Canada)	Platinum	100,000^{^}
Italy	—	50,000
Netherlands (NVPI)	3× Platinum	75,000^{^}
Spain (Promusicae)	4× Platinum	500,000
Sweden (GLF)	Gold	50,000^{^}
United Kingdom (BPI)	Gold	100,000^{^}
United States (RIAA)	2× Platinum	2,000,000^{^}
Summaries
Worldwide	—	4,000,000
^{^} Shipments figures based on certification alone.
