= Hacinas =

Coordinates: 41°59′N 3°17′W

- Municipality and town
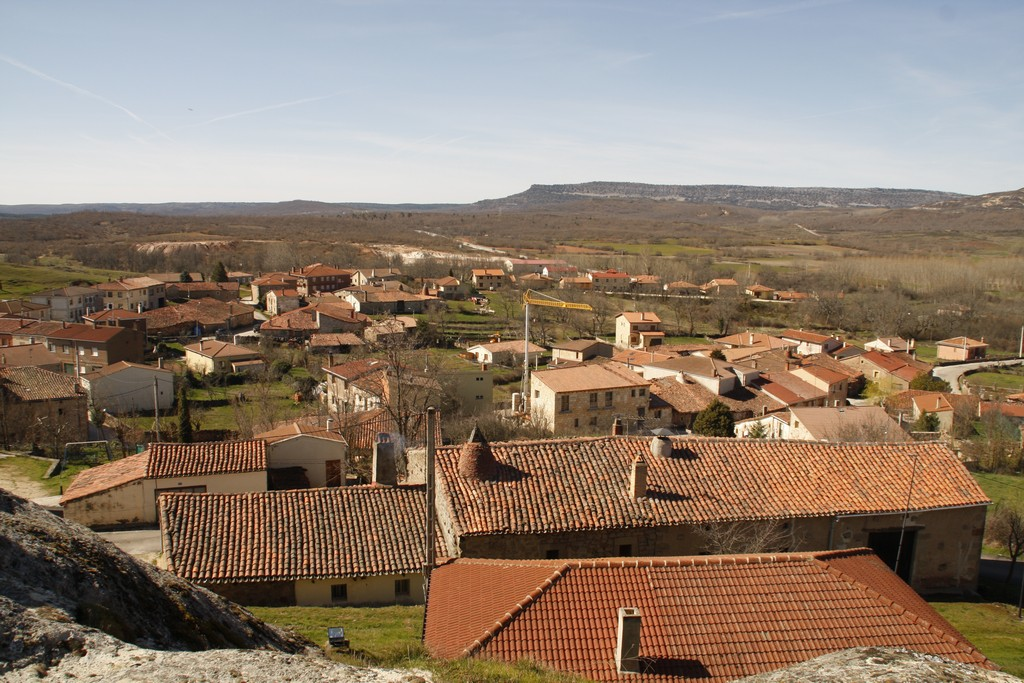
- View of Hacinas, 2010
- Interactive map of Hacinas
- Country: Spain
- Autonomous community: Castile and León
- Province: Burgos
- Comarca: Sierra de la Demanda

Area
  - Total: 19 km^{2} (7.3 sq mi)
- Elevation: 996 m (3,268 ft)

Population (2025-01-01)
  - Total: 145
  - Density: 7.6/km^{2} (20/sq mi)
- Time zone: UTC+1 (CET)
  - Summer (DST): UTC+2 (CEST)
- Postal code: 09611
- Website: http://www.hacinas.es/

Hacinas is a municipality located in the province of Burgos, Castile and León, Spain. The municipality had a population of 189 inhabitants at the 2004 INE census, and 145 in 2025-01-01.

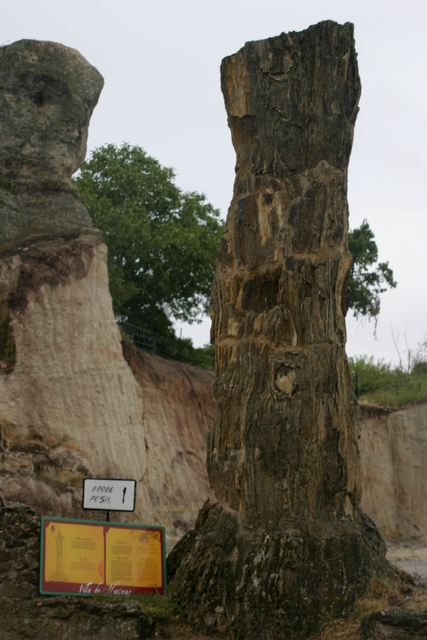
One of the fossilized trees of Hacinas
