= Castrillo de la Reina =

Coordinates: 41°59′N 3°14′W

- Municipality
- Flag Coat of arms
- Interactive map of Castrillo de la Reina
- Country: Spain
- Autonomous community: Castile and León
- Province: Burgos
- Comarca: Sierra de la Demanda

Area
  - Total: 15 km^{2} (5.8 sq mi)
- Elevation: 985 m (3,232 ft)

Population (2025-01-01)
  - Total: 159
  - Density: 11/km^{2} (27/sq mi)
- Time zone: UTC+1 (CET)
  - Summer (DST): UTC+2 (CEST)
- Postal code: 09691
- Website: http://castrillodelareina.burgos.es/

Castrillo de la Reina is a municipality located in the province of Burgos, Castile and León, Spain. According to the 2004 census (INE), the municipality has a population of 254 inhabitants.

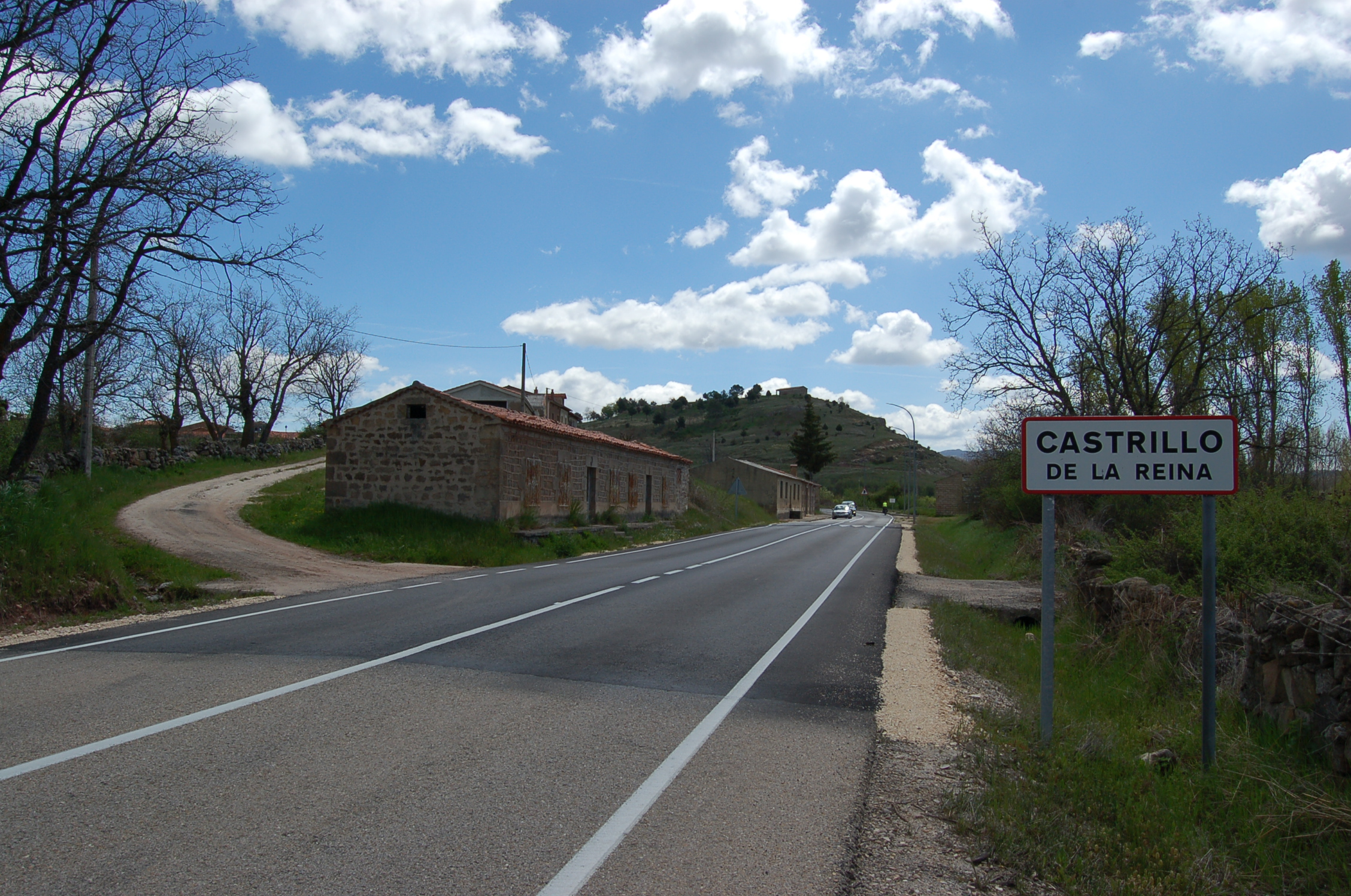
Entrance to Castrillo de la Reina on the CL-117 road
