= Monasterio de la Sierra =

Coordinates: 42°03′N 3°12′W

- Municipality
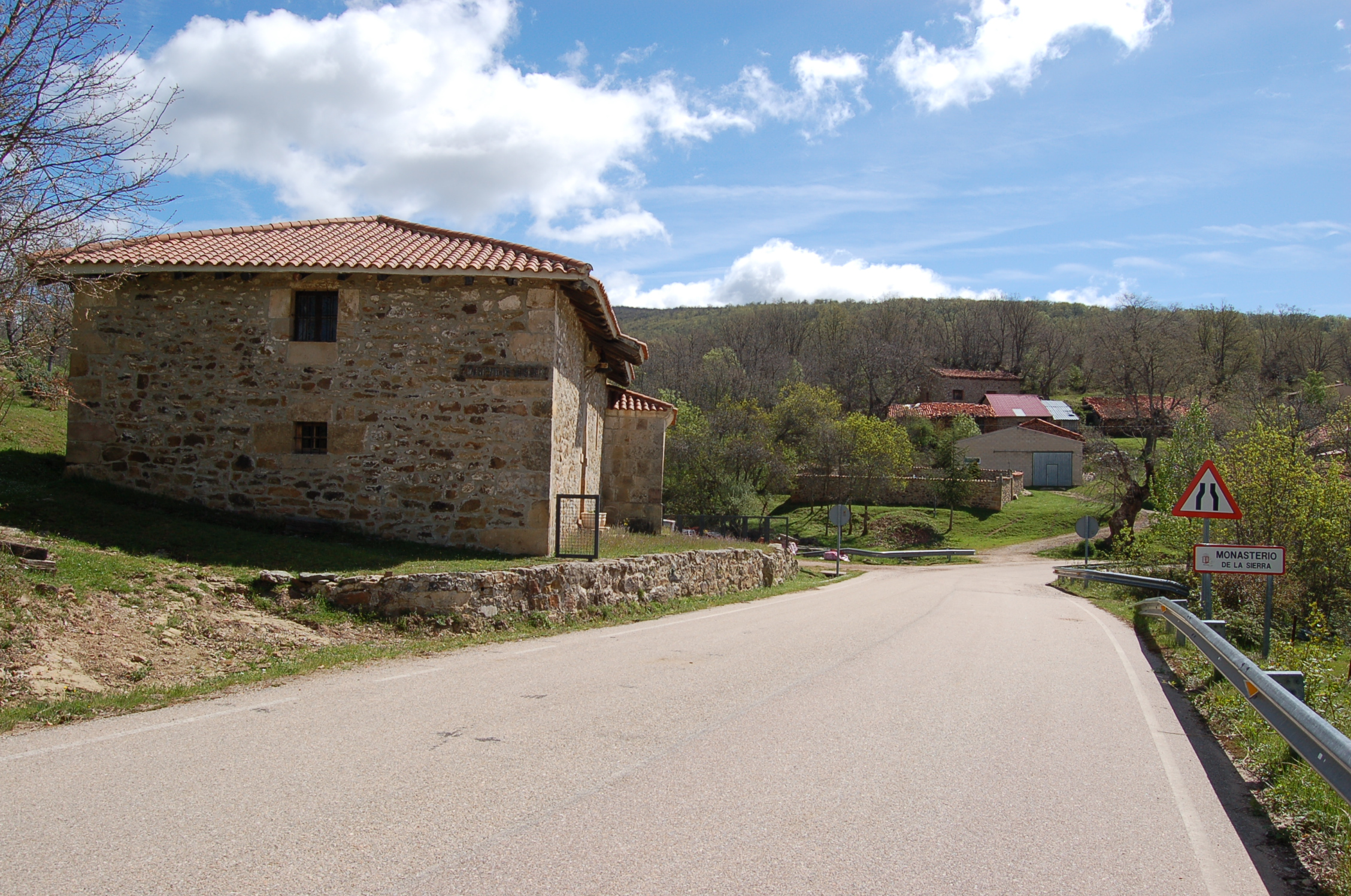
- Entrance to Monasterio de la Sierra
- Interactive map of Monasterio de la Sierra
- Country: Spain
- Autonomous community: Castile and León
- Province: Burgos
- Comarca: Sierra de la Demanda

Area
  - Total: 5 km^{2} (1.9 sq mi)
- Elevation: 1,161 m (3,809 ft)

Population (2025-01-01)
  - Total: 38
  - Density: 7.6/km^{2} (20/sq mi)
- Time zone: UTC+1 (CET)
  - Summer (DST): UTC+2 (CEST)
- Postal code: 09613
- Website: http://www.monasteriodelasierra.es/

Monasterio de la Sierra is a municipality and town located in the province of Burgos, Castile and León, Spain. According to the 2004 census (INE), the municipality has a population of 43 inhabitants.
