= Rabanera del Pinar =

Coordinates: 41°53′N 3°12′W

- Municipality and town
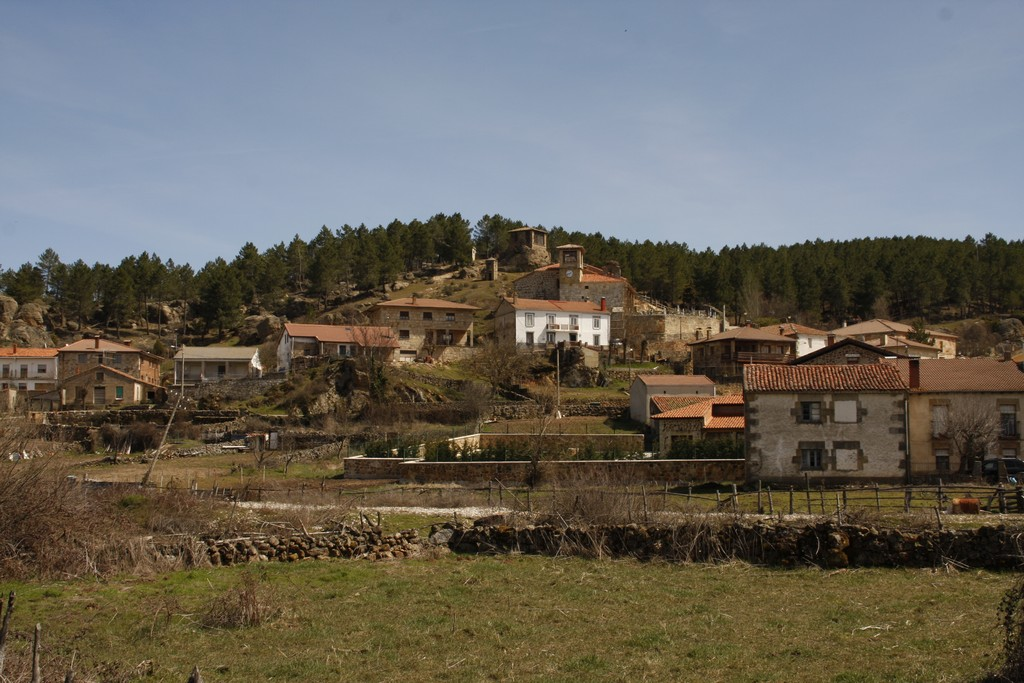
- View of Rabanera del Pinar, 2010

- Coat of arms
- Interactive map of Rabanera del Pinar
- Country: Spain
- Autonomous community: Castile and León
- Province: Burgos
- Comarca: Sierra de la Demanda

Area
  - Total: 33.24 km^{2} (12.83 sq mi)
- Elevation: 1,106 m (3,629 ft)

Population (2025-01-01)
  - Total: 94
  - Density: 2.8/km^{2} (7.3/sq mi)
- Time zone: UTC+1 (CET)
  - Summer (DST): UTC+2 (CEST)
- Postal code: 09660
- Website: https://www.rabaneradelpinar.es/

Rabanera del Pinar is a municipality located in the province of Burgos, Castile and León, Spain. According to the 2004 census (INE), the municipality has a population of 141 inhabitants.

Rabanera del Pinar is a place with a paleobotanical interest, and is home to a large pine forest of Pinus sylvestris (Scots pine).
