= Huerta de Rey =

Coordinates: 41°50′26″N 3°20′51″W

- Municipality and town
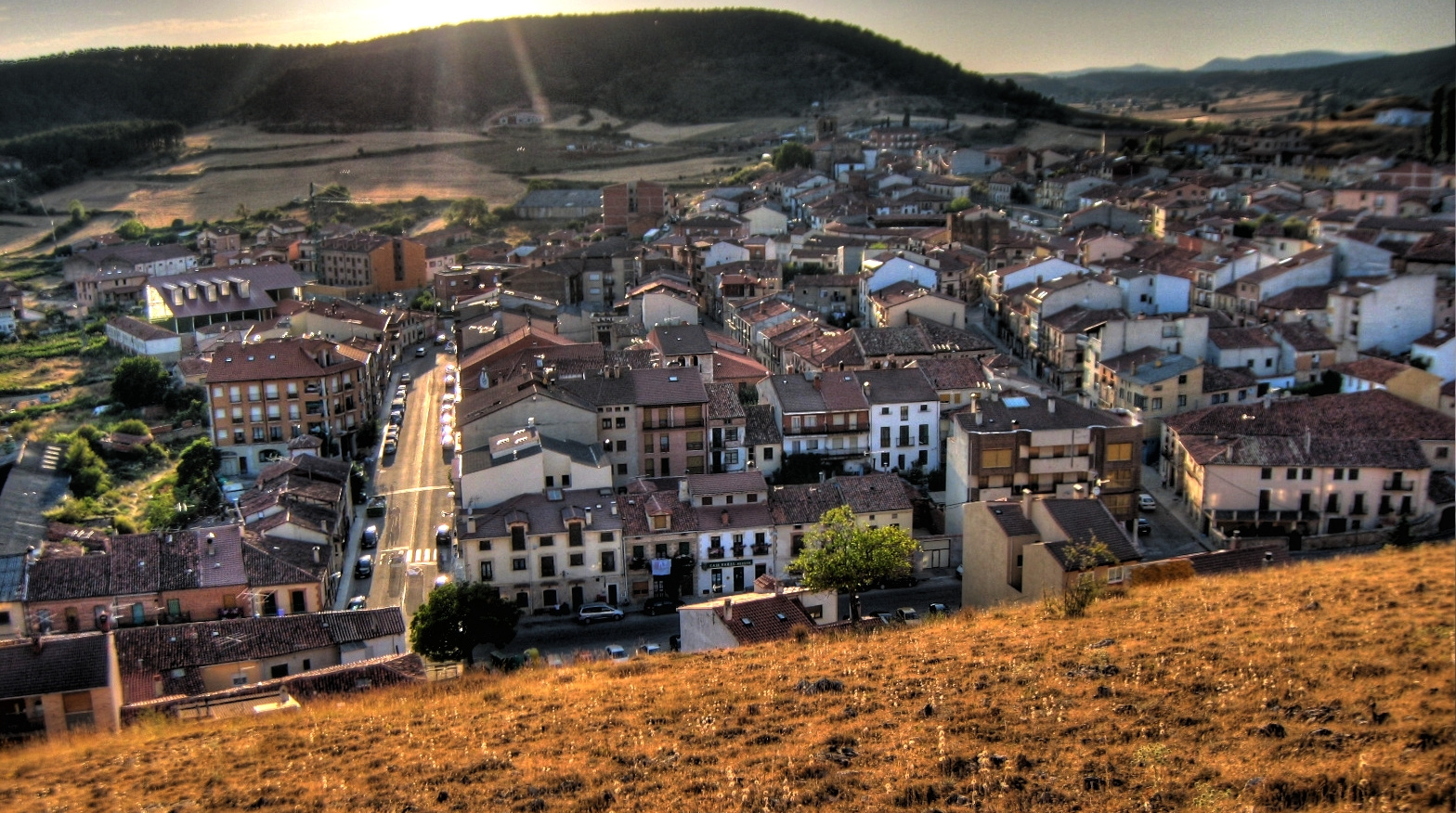
- Huerta de Rey at dawn, 2010

- Flag Coat of arms

- Municipal location of Huerta de Rey in Burgos province
- Country: Spain
- Autonomous community: Castile and León
- Province: Burgos
- Comarca: Sierra de la Demanda

Area
  - Total: 97 km^{2} (37 sq mi)
- Elevation: 1,007 m (3,304 ft)

Population (2025-01-01)
  - Total: 889
  - Density: 9.2/km^{2} (24/sq mi)
- Time zone: UTC+1 (CET)
  - Summer (DST): UTC+2 (CEST)
- Postal code: 09174
- Website: http://www.huertaderey.es/

Huerta de Rey is a municipality and town located in the province of Burgos, Castile and León, Spain. According to the 2004 census (INE), the municipality has a population of 1,208 inhabitants.
