= Jaramillo de la Fuente =

Coordinates: 42°07′N 3°19′W

- Municipality
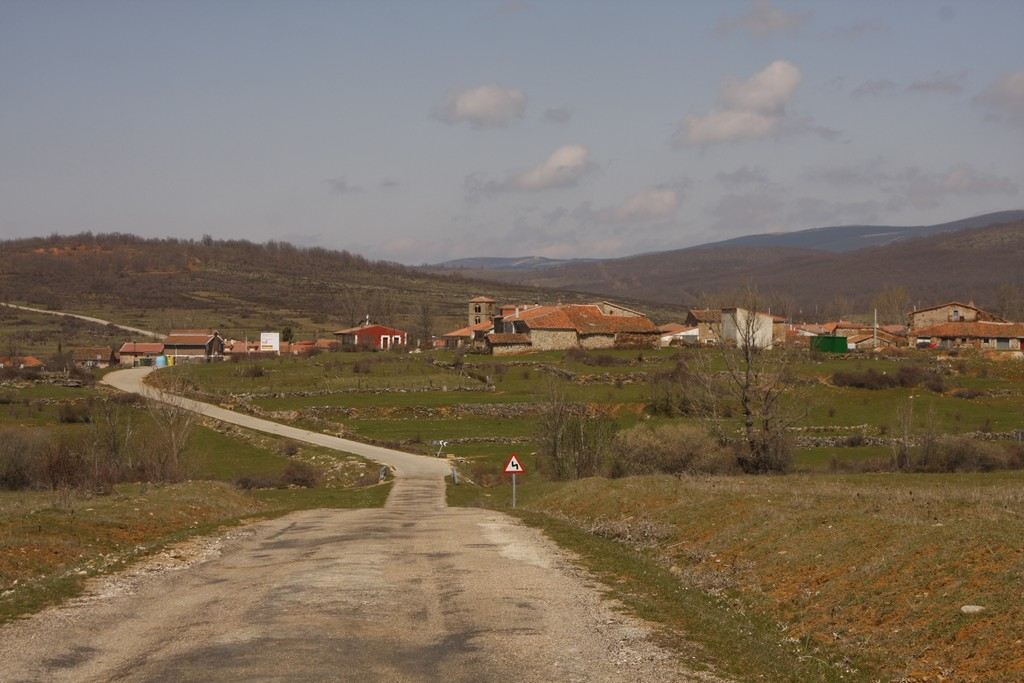
- View of Jaramillo de la Fuente, 2010

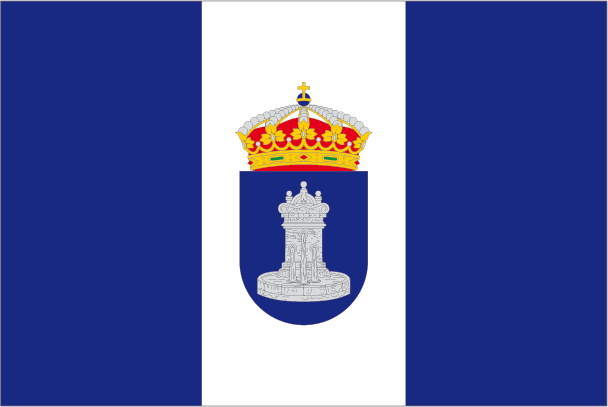
- Flag Coat of arms
- Interactive map of Jaramillo de la Fuente
- Country: Spain
- Autonomous community: Castile and León
- Province: Burgos
- Comarca: Sierra de la Demanda

Area
  - Total: 22 km^{2} (8.5 sq mi)
- Elevation: 1,069 m (3,507 ft)

Population (2025-01-01)
  - Total: 45
  - Density: 2.0/km^{2} (5.3/sq mi)
- Time zone: UTC+1 (CET)
  - Summer (DST): UTC+2 (CEST)
- Postal code: 09640
- Website: http://www.jaramillodelafuente.es/

Jaramillo de la Fuente is a municipality located in the province of Burgos, Castile and León, Spain. According to the 2004 census (INE), the municipality has a population of 41 inhabitants.

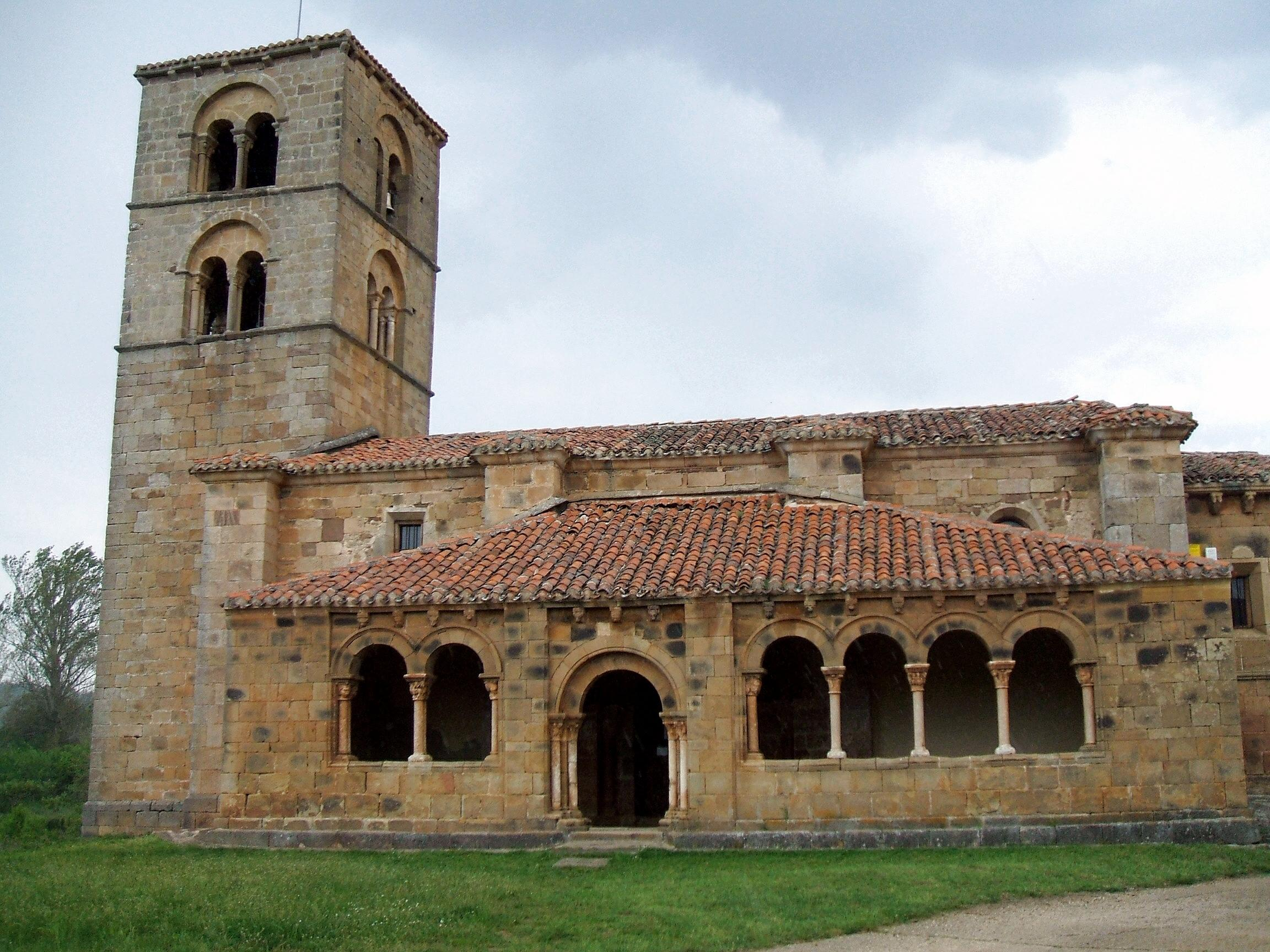
Nuestra Señora de la Asunción church (12th century).
