= Riocavado de la Sierra =

Coordinates: 42°09′N 3°12′W

- Municipality and town
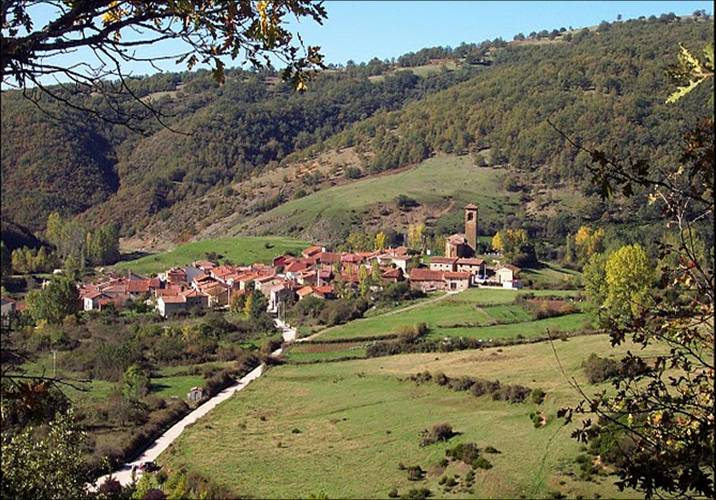
- View of Riocavado de la Sierra

- Coat of arms
- Interactive map of Riocavado de la Sierra
- Country: Spain
- Autonomous community: Castile and León
- Province: Burgos
- Comarca: Sierra de la Demanda

Area
  - Total: 43.316 km^{2} (16.724 sq mi)
- Elevation: 1,181 m (3,875 ft)

Population (2025-01-01)
  - Total: 54
  - Density: 1.2/km^{2} (3.2/sq mi)
- Time zone: UTC+1 (CET)
  - Summer (DST): UTC+2 (CEST)
- Postal code: 09615
- Website: http://www.riocavadodelasierra.es/

Riocavado de la Sierra is a municipality and town located in the province of Burgos, Castile and León, Spain. According to the 2004 census (INE), the municipality had a population of 71.
