= Paúles de Lara =

- Town
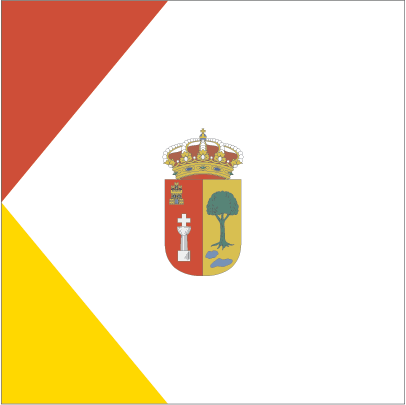
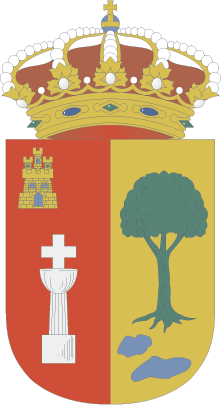
- Flag Seal

- Location in Spain
- Coordinates: 42°09′N 3°28′W
- Country: Spain
- Autonomous community: Castile and León
- Province: Burgos
- Comarca: Sierra de la Demanda
- Municipality: Jurisdicción de Lara

Paúles de Lara is a village in the municipality of Jurisdicción de Lara, located southeast of the province of Burgos, belonging to the autonomous community of Castilla y León (Spain). It is situated 40 km from the capital, Burgos.
