= Pinilla de los Moros =

Coordinates: 42°04′N 3°19′W

- Municipality and town
- Interactive map of Pinilla de los Moros
- Country: Spain
- Autonomous community: Castile and León
- Province: Burgos
- Comarca: Sierra de la Demanda

Area
  - Total: 10 km^{2} (3.9 sq mi)
- Elevation: 972 m (3,189 ft)

Population (2025-01-01)
  - Total: 30
  - Density: 3.0/km^{2} (7.8/sq mi)
- Time zone: UTC+1 (CET)
  - Summer (DST): UTC+2 (CEST)
- Postal code: 09613
- Website: http://www.pinilladelosmoros.es/

Pinilla de los Moros is a municipality and town located in the province of Burgos, Castile and León, Spain. According to the 2004 census (INE), the municipality had a population of 44 inhabitants.
