= Arauzo de Miel =

- Municipality and town
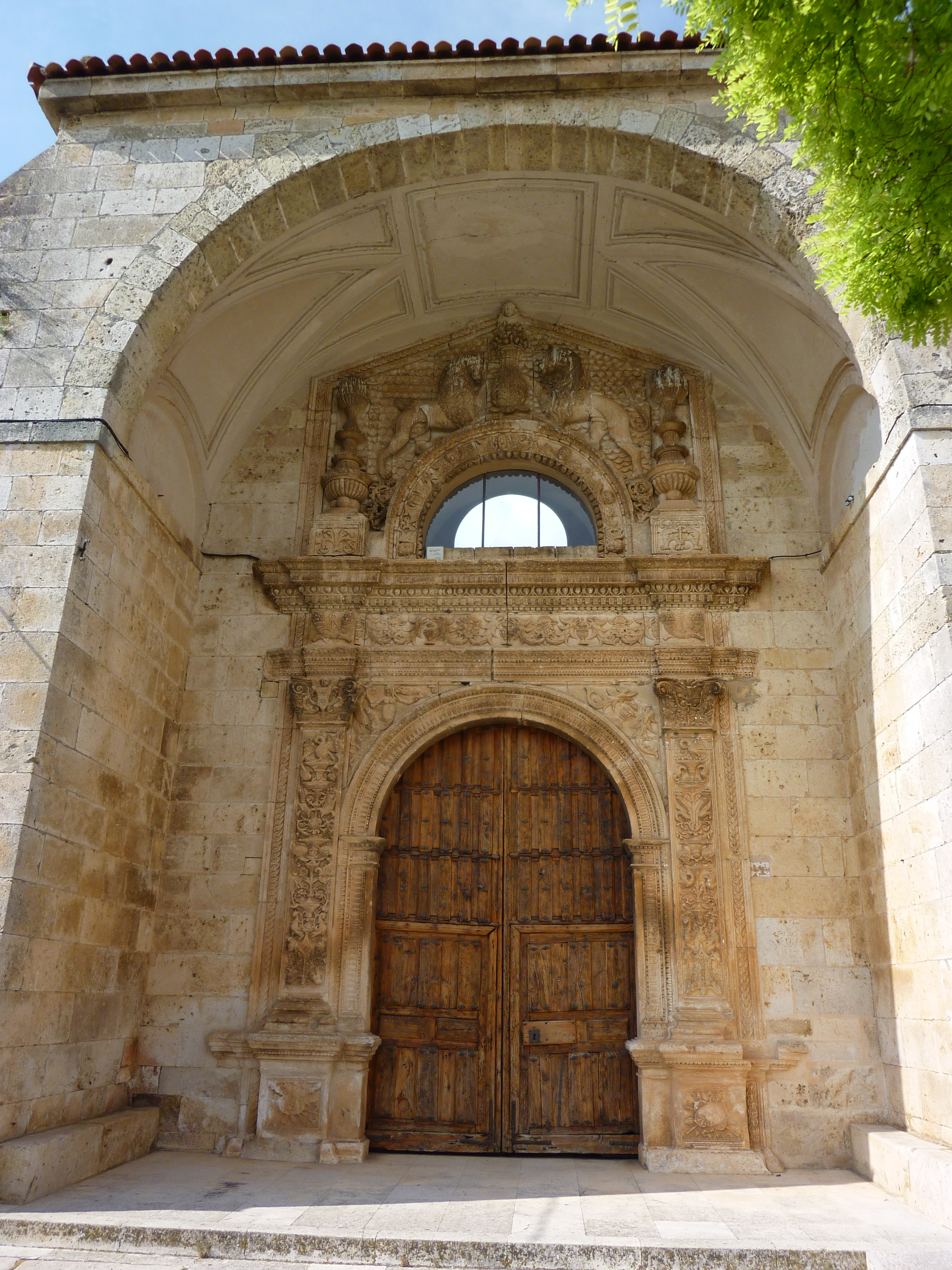
- Portal of the church of Santa Eulalia, Arauzo de Miel, province of Burgos, Spain.

- Flag Coat of arms

- Location within Castile and León Location within Spain
- Coordinates: 41°51′N 3°23′W
- Country: Spain
- Autonomous community: Castile and León
- Province: Burgos
- Comarca: Sierra de la Demanda

Area
  - Total: 57.10 km^{2} (22.05 sq mi)
- Elevation: 1,019 m (3,343 ft)

Population (2004)
  - Total: 363
  - Density: 6.36/km^{2} (16.5/sq mi)
- Time zone: UTC+1 (CET)
  - Summer (DST): UTC+2 (CEST)
- Postal code: 09451
- Website: http://arauzodemiel.burgos.es/

Arauzo de Miel is a municipality and town located in the province of Burgos, Castile and León, Spain. According to the 2004 census (INE), the municipality had a population of 363 inhabitants.

The municipality of Arauzo de Miel is made up of two towns: Arauzo de Miel (seat or capital) and Doña Santos.
