= Aceña de Lara =

- Town
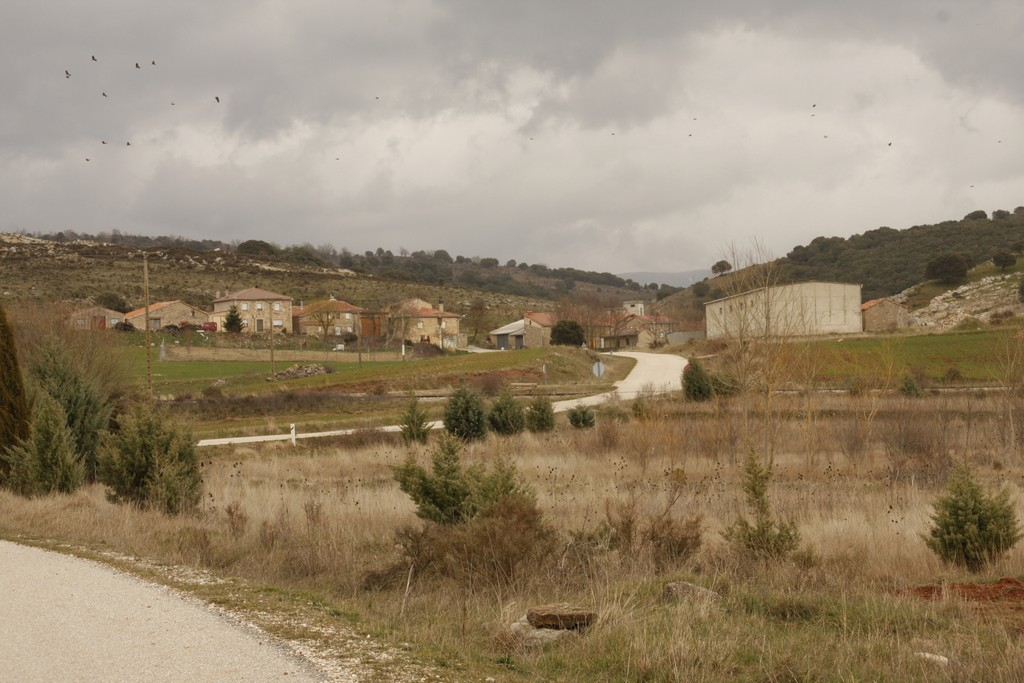
- View of Aceña de Lara, 2010

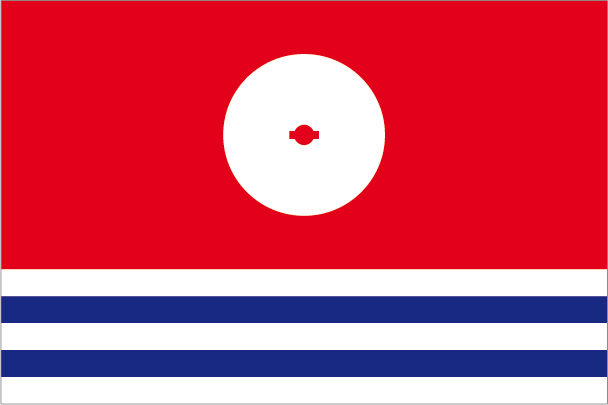
- Flag Coat of arms

- Location in Spain Aceña de Lara (Spain)
- Coordinates: 42°14′N 3°44′W
- Country: Spain
- Autonomous community: Castile and León
- Province: Burgos
- Comarca: Sierra de la Demanda
- Municipality: Jurisdicción de Lara

Aceña de Lara or La Aceña is a village in the municipality of Jurisdicción de Lara, located southeast of the province of Burgos, Castilla y León (Spain).
