= Barbadillo del Mercado =

- Municipality and town
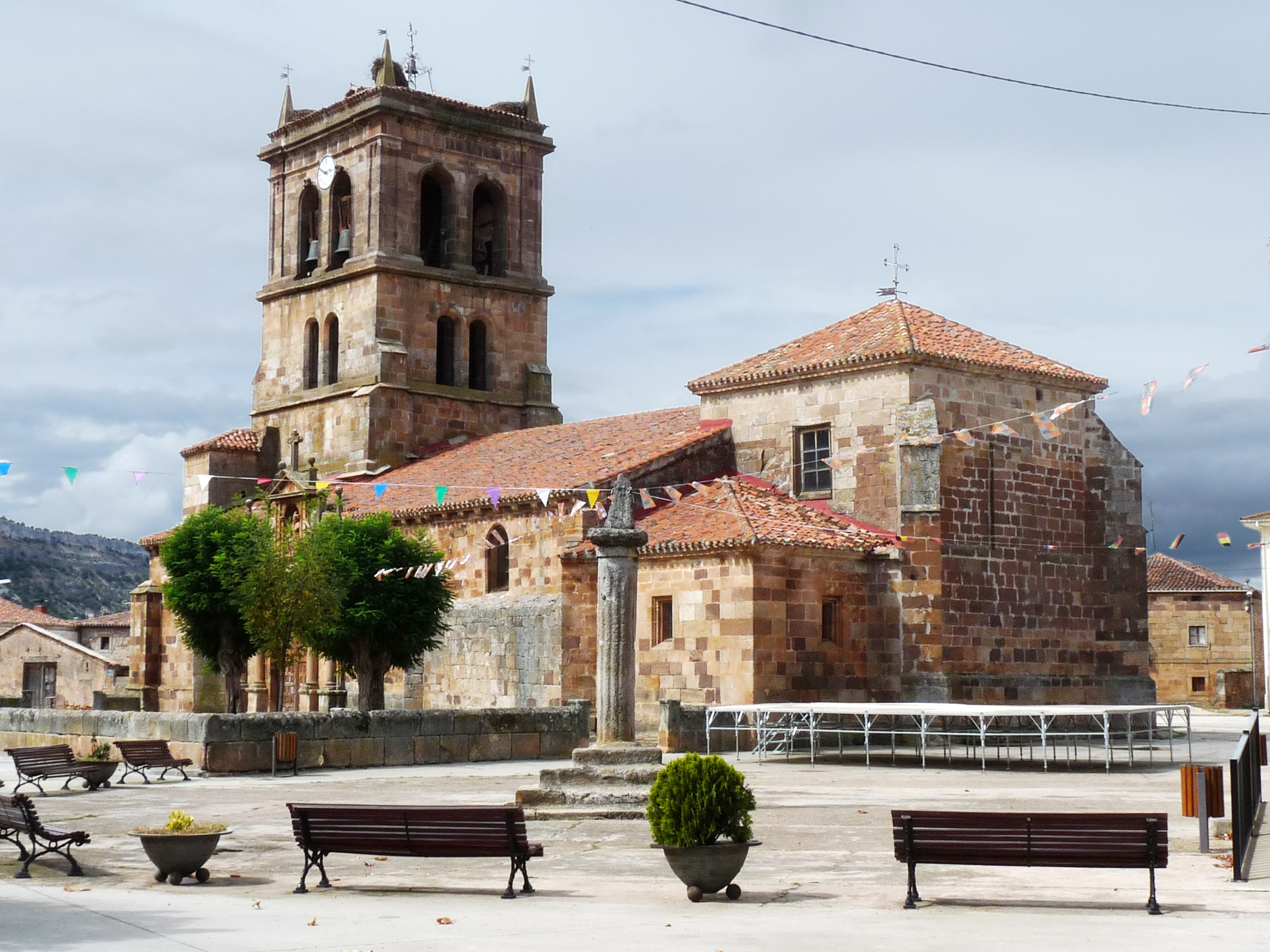
- Saint Peter's church (17th century)

- Flag Coat of arms

- Location within Castile and León Location within Spain
- Coordinates: 42°02′N 3°21′W
- Country: Spain
- Autonomous community: Castile and León
- Province: Burgos
- Comarca: Sierra de la Demanda

Area
  - Total: 15.19 km^{2} (5.86 sq mi)
- Elevation: 954 m (3,130 ft)

Population (2025-01-01)
  - Total: 134
  - Density: 8.82/km^{2} (22.8/sq mi)
- Time zone: UTC+1 (CET)
  - Summer (DST): UTC+2 (CEST)
- Postal code: 09613
- Website: http://www.barbadillodelmercado.es/

Barbadillo del Mercado is a municipality and town located in the province of Burgos, Castile and León, Spain. According to the 2004 INE census, the municipality had a population of 169.
