= Arauzo de Torre =

- Municipality and town
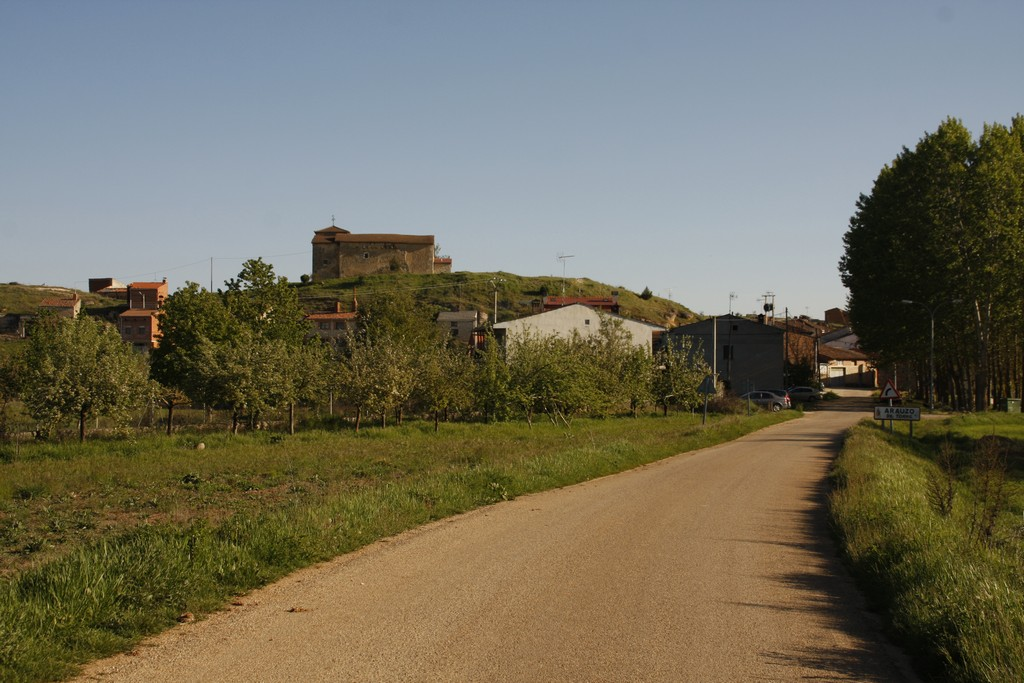
- View of Arauzo de Torre, 2010

- Flag Coat of arms

- Location within Castile and León Location within Spain
- Coordinates: 41°48′N 3°25′W
- Country: Spain
- Autonomous community: Castile and León
- Province: Burgos
- Comarca: Sierra de la Demanda

Government
  - Mayor: Esteban Marina Revilla

Area
  - Total: 13.59 km^{2} (5.25 sq mi)
- Elevation: 939 m (3,081 ft)

Population (2025-01-01)
  - Total: 55
  - Density: 4.0/km^{2} (10/sq mi)
- Demonym: Arauztorrienses
- Time zone: UTC+1 (CET)
  - Summer (DST): UTC+2 (CEST)
- Postal code: 09451
- Website: http://www.arauzodetorre.es/

Arauzo de Torre is a municipality and town located in the province of Burgos, Castile and León, Spain. According to the 2005 census (INE), the municipality had a population of 116 inhabitants.
