= Palacios de la Sierra =

Coordinates: 41°58′N 3°08′W

- Municipality and town
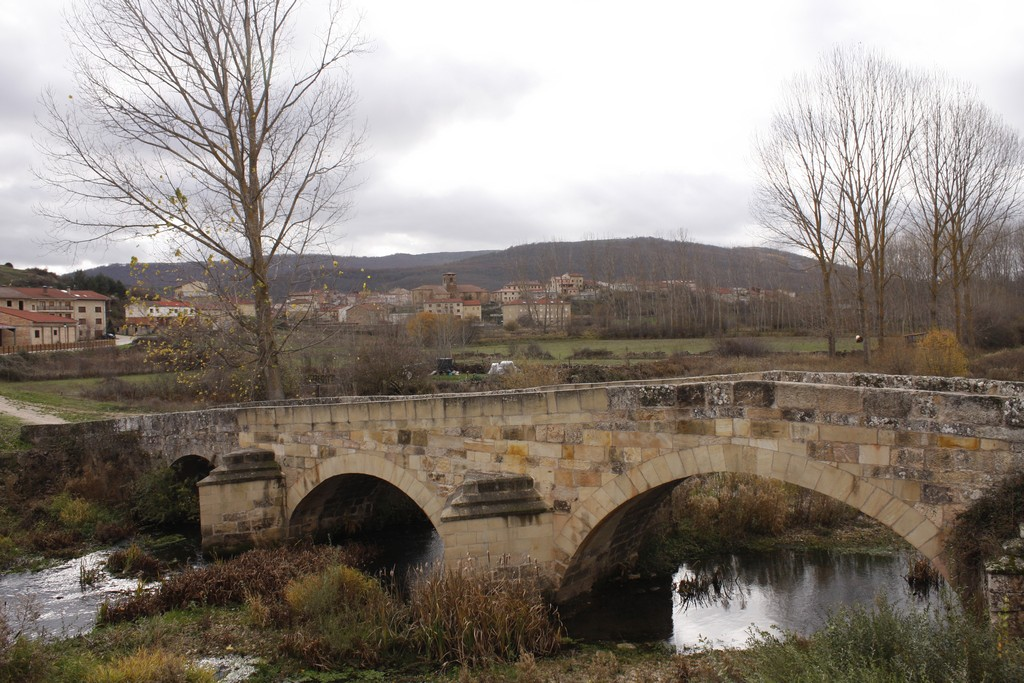
- View of Palacios de la Sierra, 2009

- Flag Coat of arms

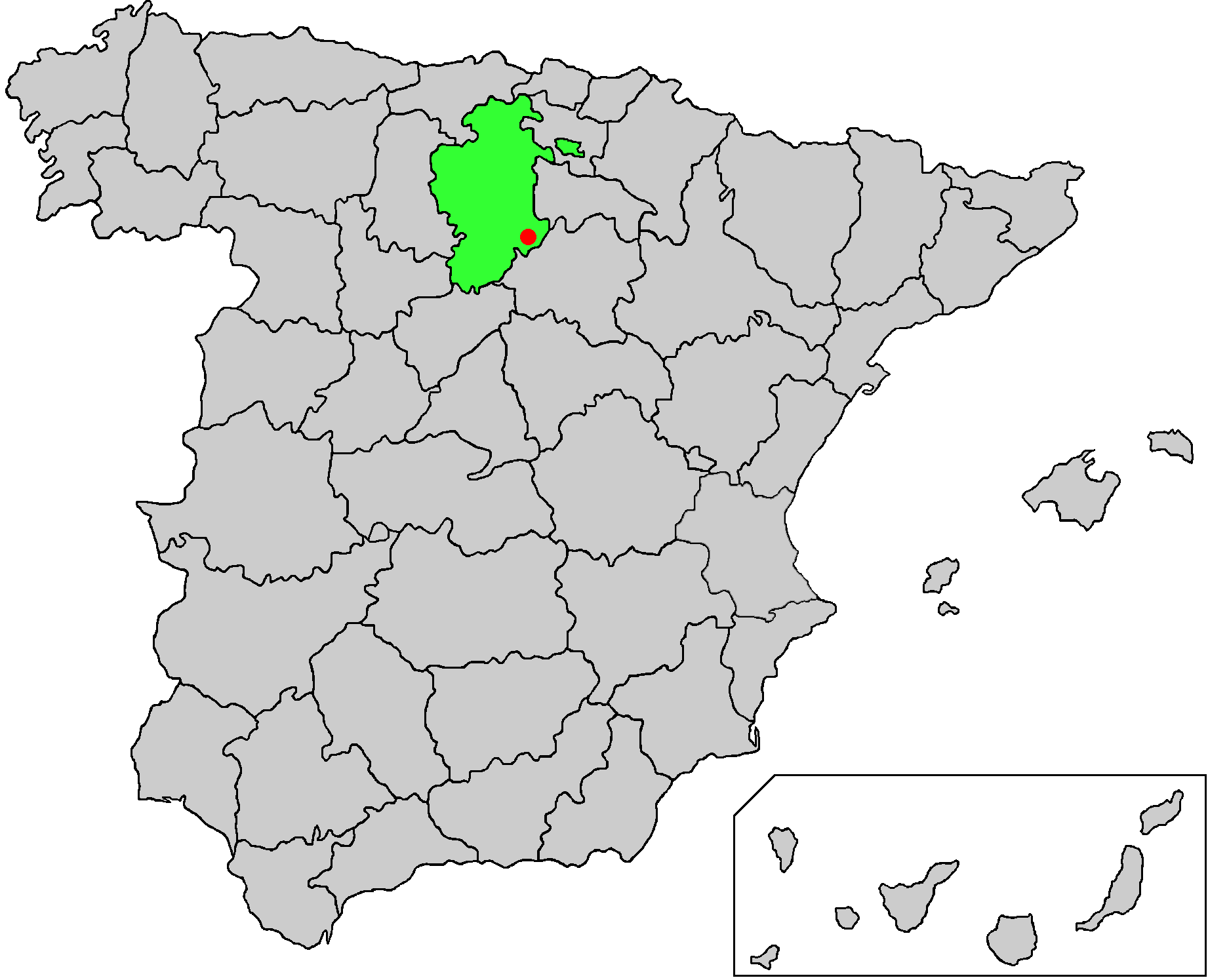
- Location in Spain
- Country: Spain
- Autonomous community: Castile and León
- Province: Burgos
- Comarca: Sierra de la Demanda

Area
  - Total: 70.40 km^{2} (27.18 sq mi)
- Elevation: 1,068 m (3,504 ft)

Population (2025-01-01)
  - Total: 662
  - Density: 9.40/km^{2} (24.4/sq mi)
- Time zone: UTC+1 (CET)
  - Summer (DST): UTC+2 (CEST)
- Postal code: 09680
- Climate: Csb
- Website: http://www.palaciosdelasierra.es/

Palacios de la Sierra is a small town and municipality in the Spanish province of Burgos. The local economy is primarily based on agriculture and logging.

Historical and architectural points of interest include the 16th-century church of Santa Eulalia, the Hermitage of Nuestra Señora del Arroyal (17th century), the necropolis of El Castillo (6th and 7th centuries), the necropolis of Nava (14th century), the necropolis of Bañuelos (14th century?), as well as several medieval bridges.

Town Holidays: Santiago, Santa Ana and la Virgen del Arroyal (July 25, 26, and 27), Santa Eulalia (December 10).
