= Contreras, Province of Burgos =

Coordinates: 42.0214°N 3.4100°W

Contreras
- Municipality and town
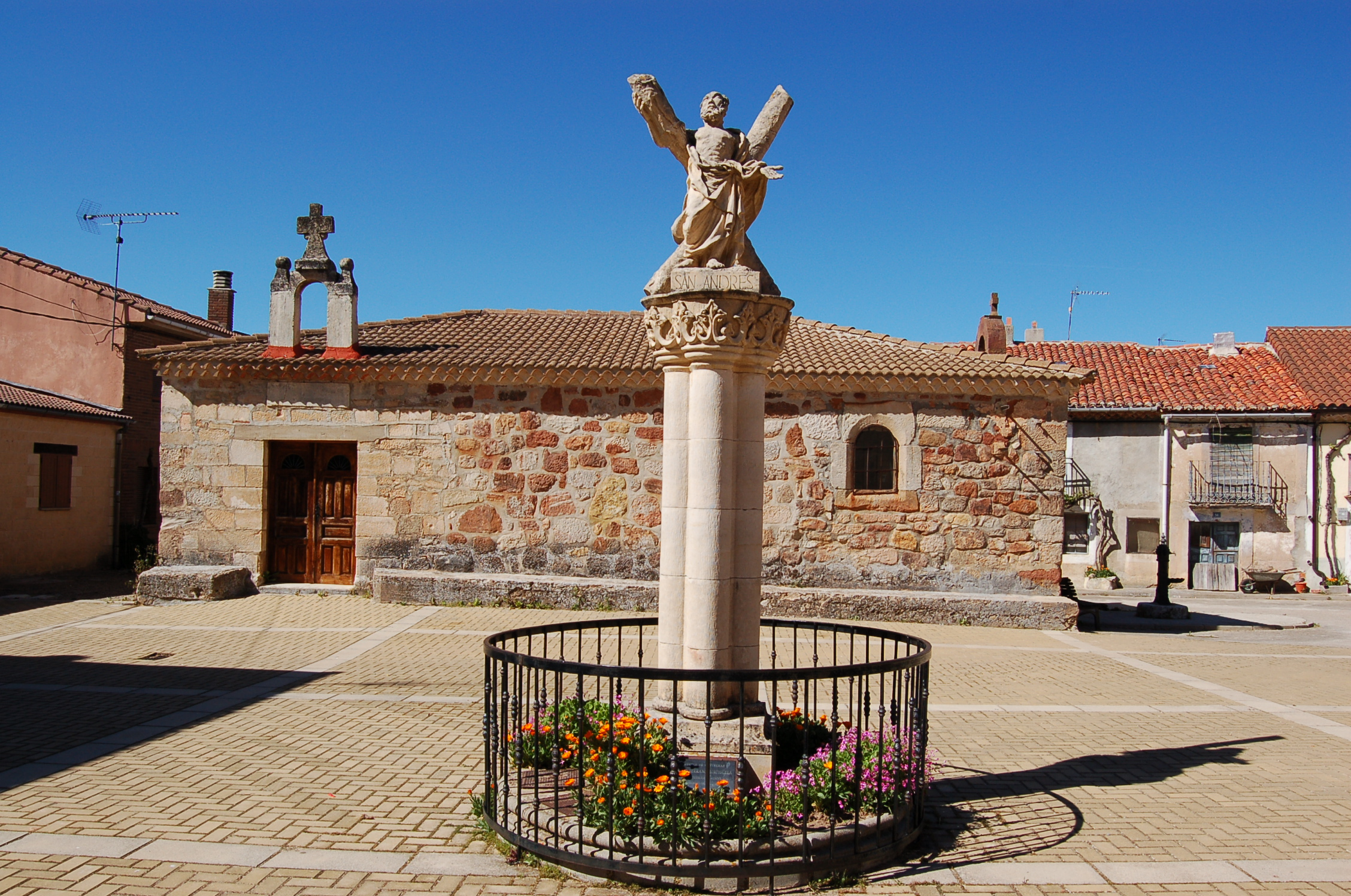
- Interactive map of Contreras
- Country: Spain
- Autonomous community: Castile and León
- Province: Burgos
- Comarca: Sierra de la Demanda

Area
  - Total: 38 km^{2} (15 sq mi)
- Elevation: 1,030 m (3,380 ft)

Population (2025-01-01)
  - Total: 81
  - Density: 2.1/km^{2} (5.5/sq mi)
- Time zone: UTC+1 (CET)
  - Summer (DST): UTC+2 (CEST)
- Postal code: 09613
- Website: http://www.contreras.es/

Contreras is a municipality located in the province of Burgos, Castile and León, Spain.
