= Cabezón de la Sierra =

Coordinates: 41°56′N 3°14′W

- Municipality and town
- Flag Coat of arms
- Interactive map of Cabezón de la Sierra
- Country: Spain
- Autonomous community: Castile and León
- Province: Burgos
- Comarca: Sierra de la Demanda

Area
  - Total: 22 km^{2} (8.5 sq mi)
- Elevation: 1,000 m (3,300 ft)

Population (2025-01-01)
  - Total: 33
  - Density: 1.5/km^{2} (3.9/sq mi)
- Time zone: UTC+1 (CET)
  - Summer (DST): UTC+2 (CEST)
- Postal code: 09612
- Website: http://www.cabezondelasierra.es/

Cabezón de la Sierra is a municipality located in the province of Burgos, Castile and León, Spain. According to the 2004 census (INE), the municipality has a population of 67 inhabitants.

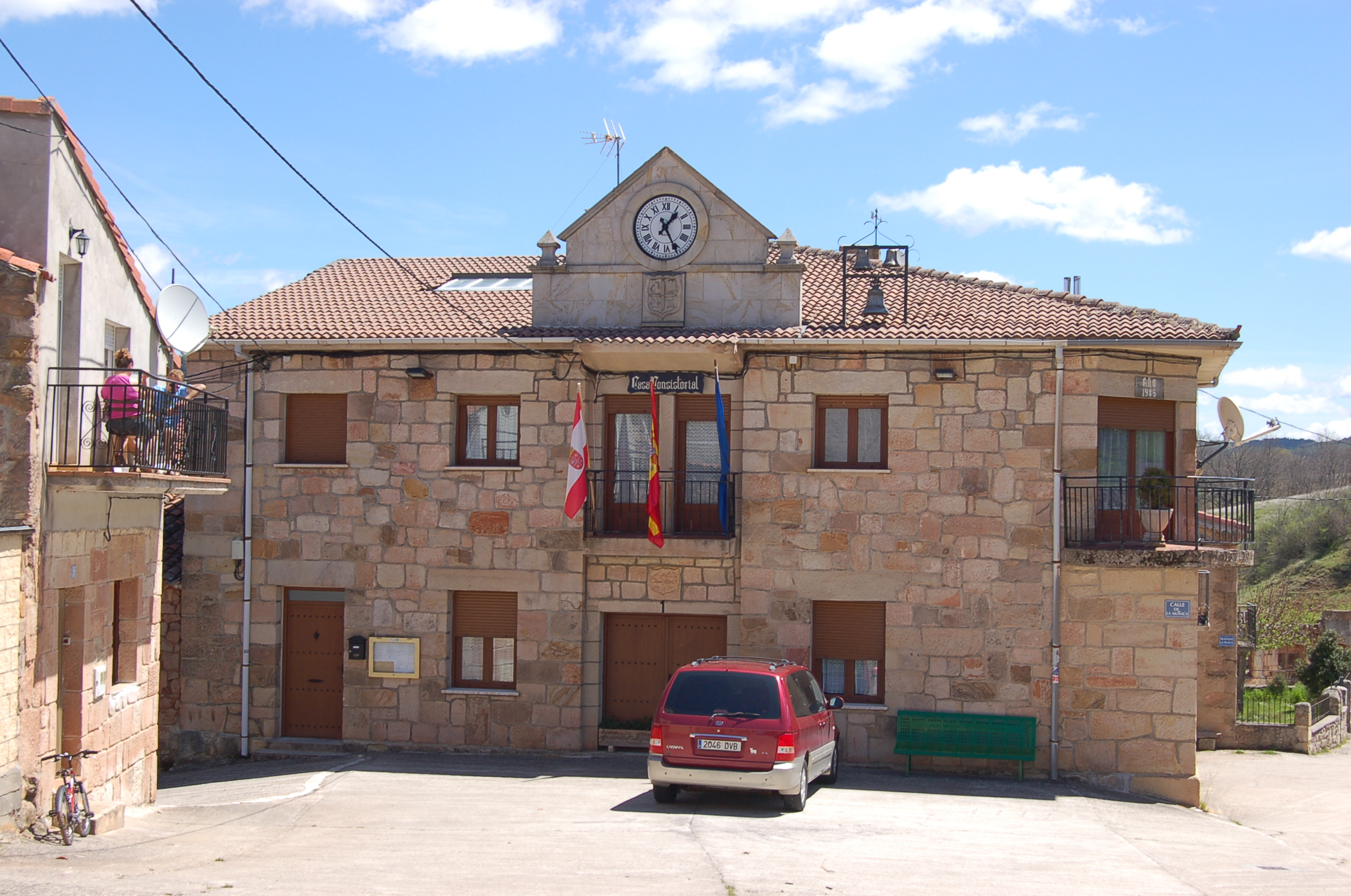
Cabezón de la Sierra Town Hall
