= Regumiel de la Sierra =

Coordinates: 41°58′N 2°59′W

- Municipality and town
- Coat of arms
- Interactive map of Regumiel de la Sierra
- Country: Spain
- Autonomous community: Castile and León
- Province: Burgos
- Comarca: Sierra de la Demanda

Area
  - Total: 20.666 km^{2} (7.979 sq mi)
- Elevation: 1,128 m (3,701 ft)

Population (2025-01-01)
  - Total: 304
  - Density: 14.7/km^{2} (38.1/sq mi)
- Time zone: UTC+1 (CET)
  - Summer (DST): UTC+2 (CEST)
- Postal code: 09693
- Website: http://www.regumieldelasierra.es/

Regumiel de la Sierra is a municipality and town located in the province of Burgos, Castile and León, Spain. According to the 2004 census (INE), the municipality has a population of 458 inhabitants.

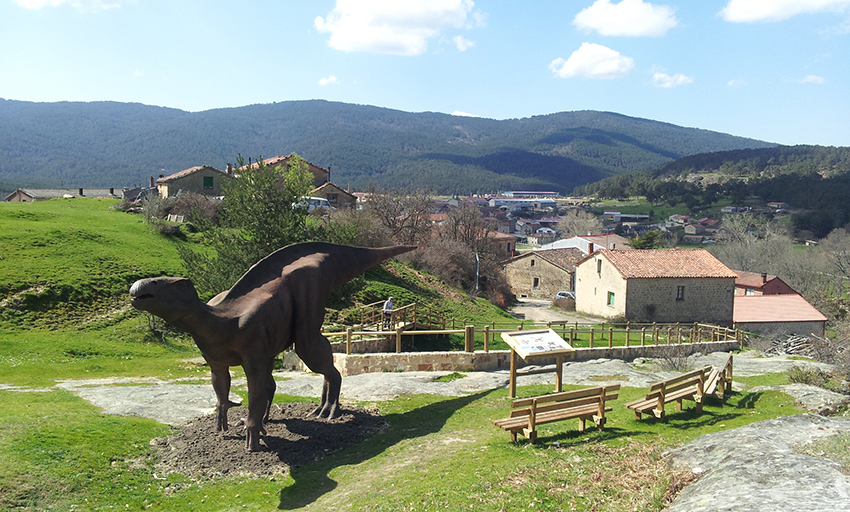
Dinosaur replica placed next to the interpretive table of the El Frontal site in Regumiel de la Sierra
