= Mamolar =

Coordinates: 41°55′N 3°22′W

- Municipality
- Coat of arms
- Interactive map of Mamolar
- Country: Spain
- Autonomous community: Castile and León
- Province: Burgos
- Comarca: Sierra de la Demanda

Area
  - Total: 18 km^{2} (6.9 sq mi)
- Elevation: 1,086 m (3,563 ft)

Population (2025-01-01)
  - Total: 27
  - Density: 1.5/km^{2} (3.9/sq mi)
- Time zone: UTC+1 (CET)
  - Summer (DST): UTC+2 (CEST)
- Postal code: 09612
- Website: http://www.mamolar.es/

Mamolar is a municipality and town located in the province of Burgos, Castile and León, Spain. According to the 2004 census (INE), the municipality has a population of 62 inhabitants.

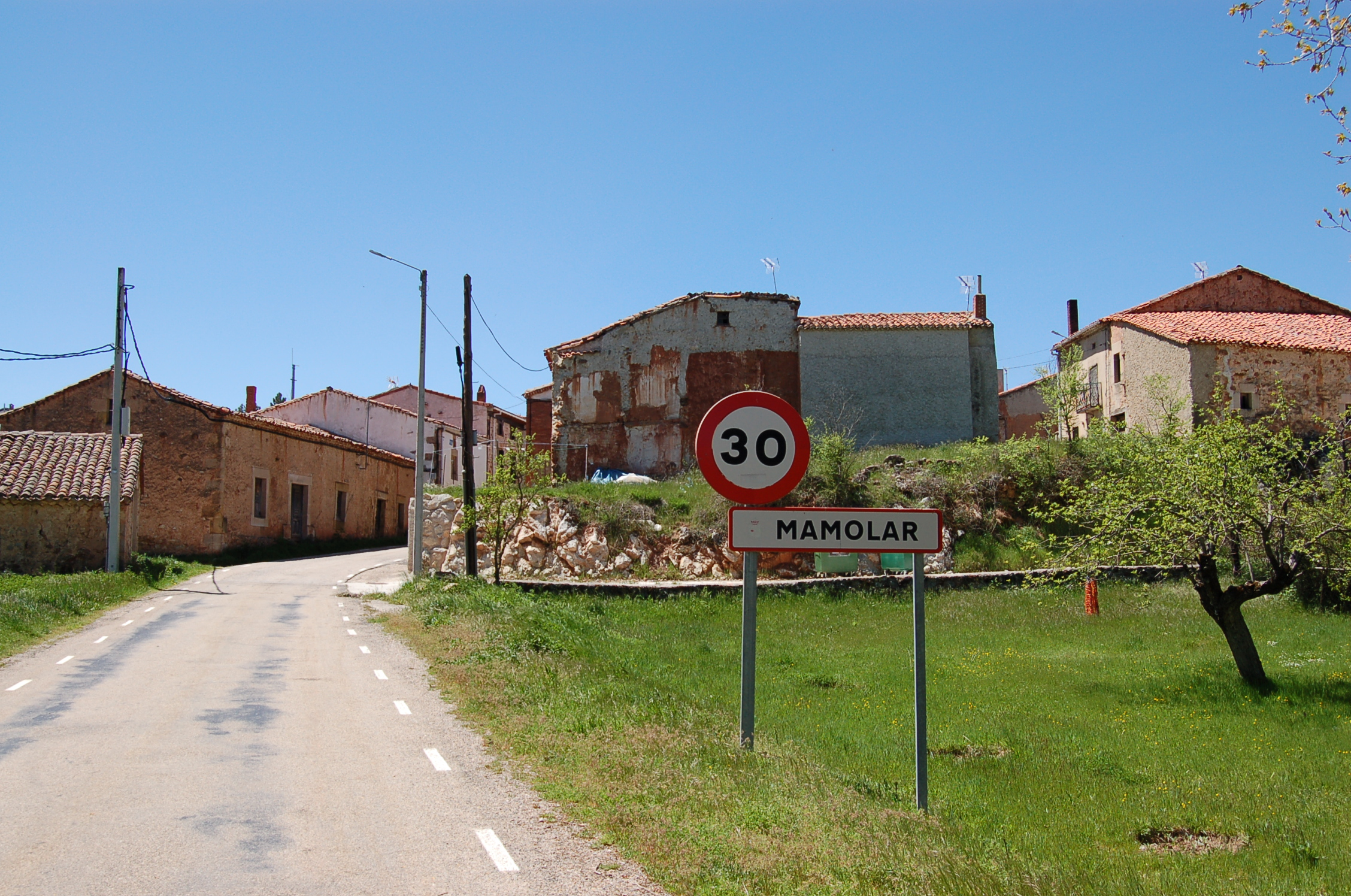
Entrance to Mamolar
