= La Gallega =

- Municipality
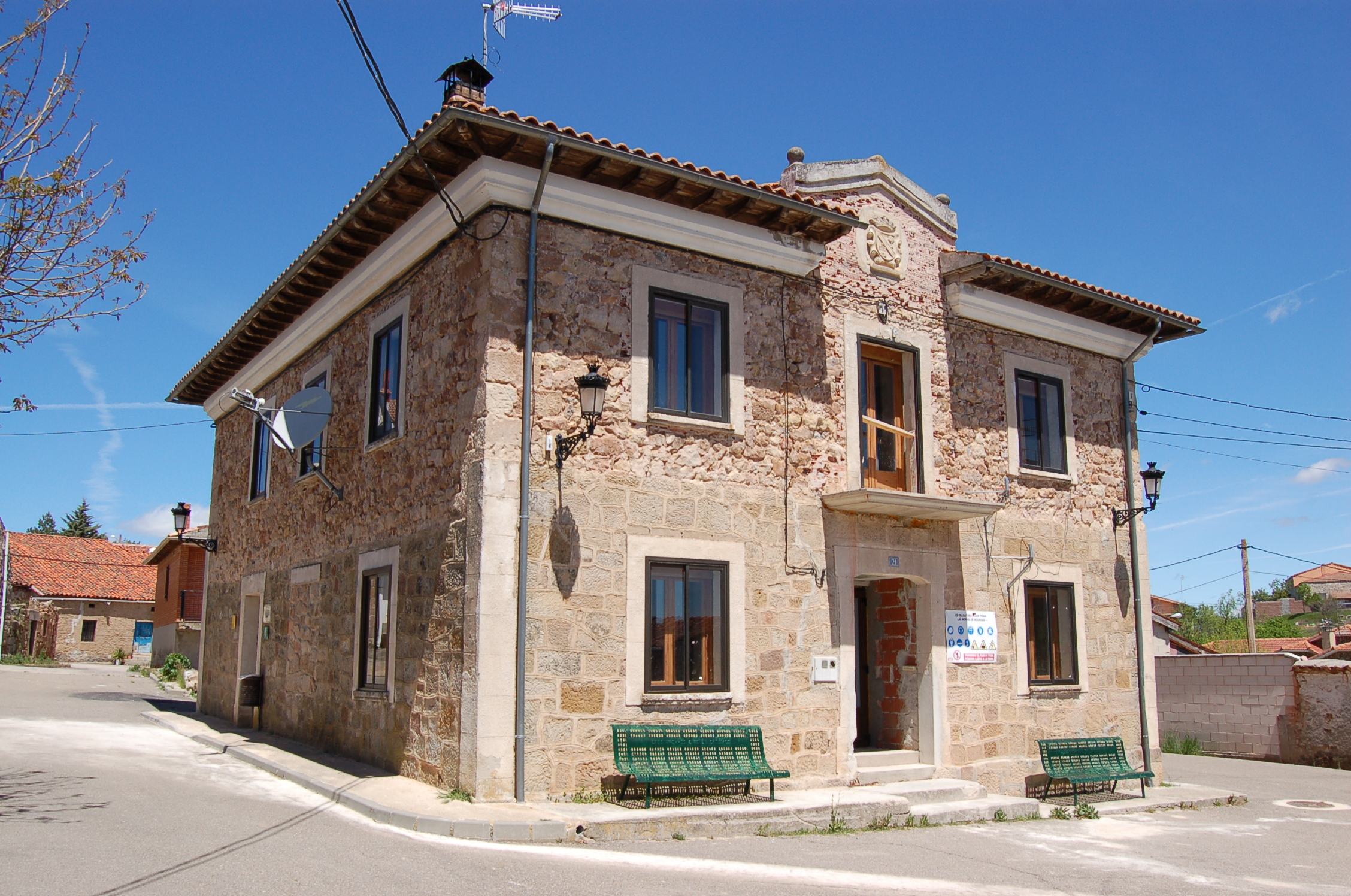
- Town hall

- Coat of arms

- Location in Spain La Gallega (Spain)
- Coordinates: 41°53′55″N 3°15′50″W
- Country: Spain
- Autonomous community: Castile and León
- Province: Burgos
- Comarca: Sierra de la Demanda

Area
  - Total: 20 km^{2} (7.7 sq mi)
- Elevation: 1,112 m (3,648 ft)

Population (2025-01-01)
  - Total: 34
  - Density: 1.7/km^{2} (4.4/sq mi)
- Time zone: UTC+1 (CET)
  - Summer (DST): UTC+2 (CEST)
- Postal code: 09612
- Website: http://www.lagallega.es/

La Gallega is a municipality located in the province of Burgos, Castile and León, Spain. According to the 2004 census (INE), the municipality has a population of 85 inhabitants.
