= Cascajares de la Sierra =

Coordinates: 42°04′N 3°24′W

- Municipality and town
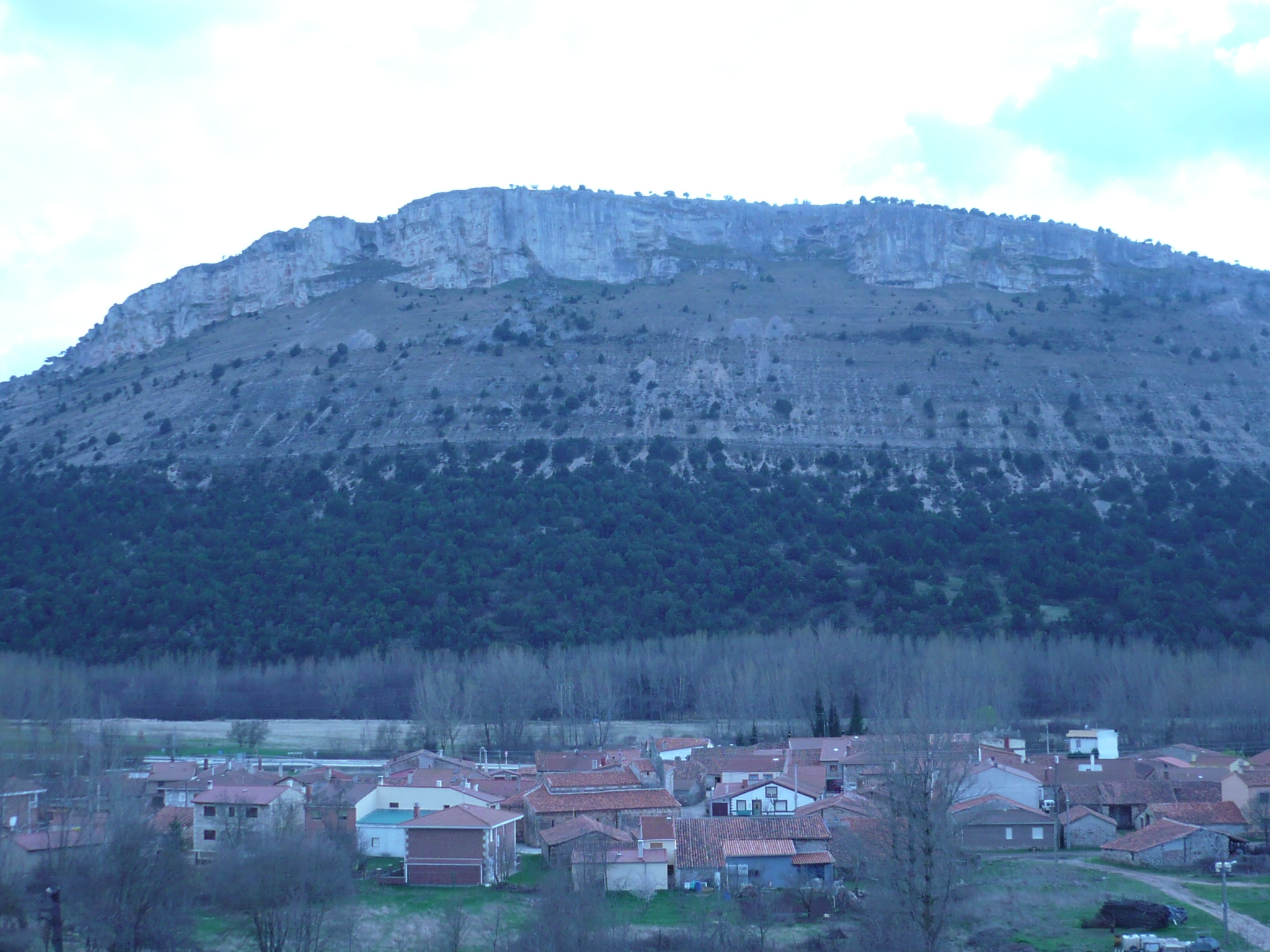
- View of Cascajares de la Sierra, 2008

- Location of Cascajares de la Sierra municipality in Burgos province
- Country: Spain
- Autonomous community: Castile and León
- Province: Burgos
- Comarca: Sierra de la Demanda

Area
  - Total: 13 km^{2} (5.0 sq mi)
- Elevation: 923 m (3,028 ft)

Population (2025-01-01)
  - Total: 25
  - Density: 1.9/km^{2} (5.0/sq mi)
- Time zone: UTC+1 (CET)
  - Summer (DST): UTC+2 (CEST)
- Postal code: 09640
- Website: http://www.cascajaresdelasierra.es/

Cascajares de la Sierra is a municipality located in the province of Burgos, Castile and León, Spain. Its history goes back a long time. Remains have been found near the place that have occurred in many different time periods. There is a cathedral of paleoanthropology, which form part of the Atapuerca World Heritage site.

== Monuments ==
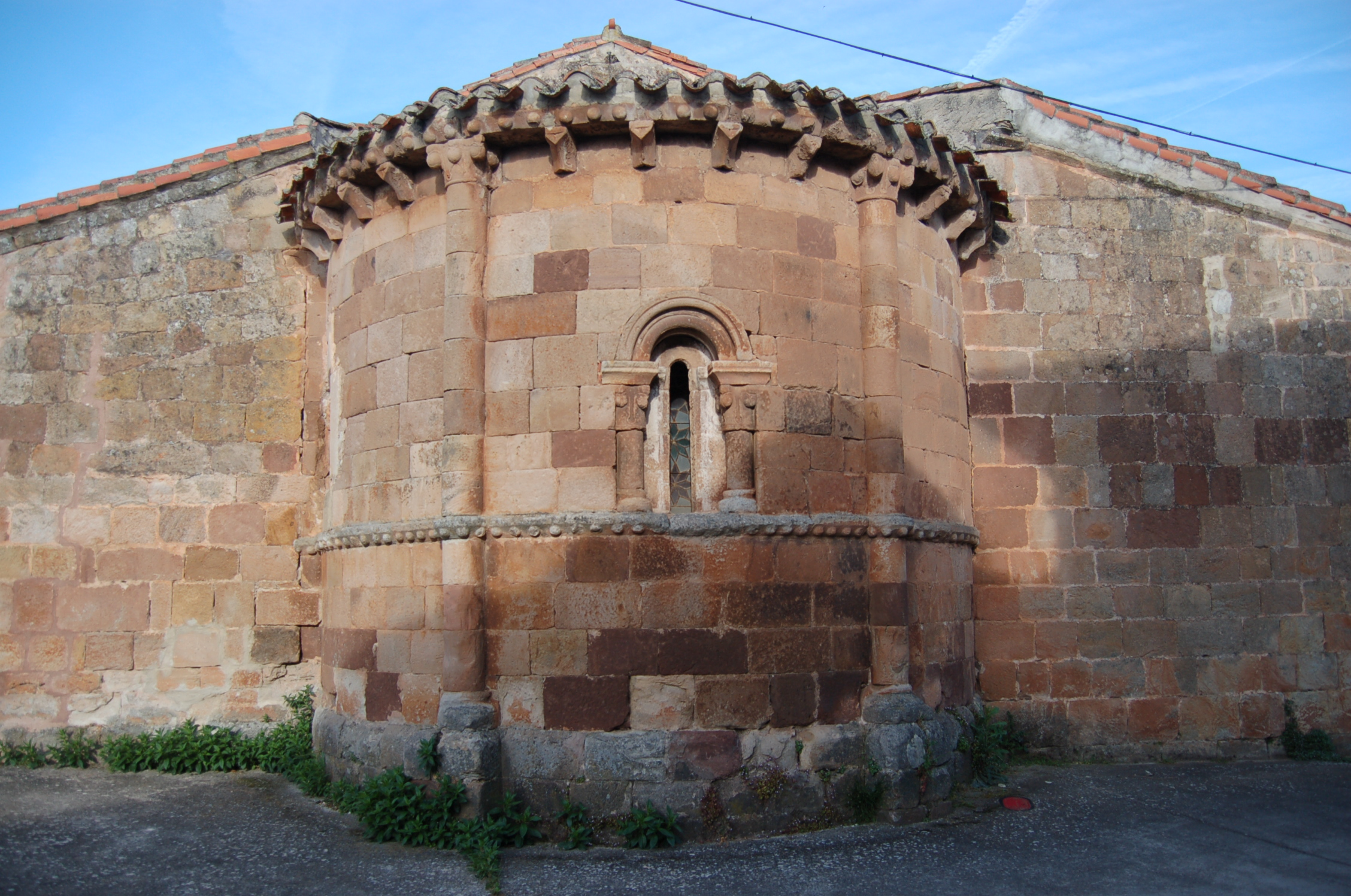
Romanesque apse.

One monument located here is the Church of Cascajares de la Sierra. It has a baptismal font and Romanesque ornamentation. An interesting thing here is the semicircular Romanesque apse and the presbytery, which are both considered the pride and joy in the early Romanesque, Visigoth, and even late twelfth century eras.

== Cuisine ==
The Morcilla de Burgos is a sausage made from pig meat. It was made from different parts of the pigs, such as the blood, intestines, etc., butter is also added. Herbs and spices like paprika were added to improve the flavor. Later, the rice pudding of Burgos was incorporated. Now, the foundation for the Morcilla de Burgos was laid. It is now "soda and picantosa," with blood, rice, butter, horcal onion, salt, pepper and paprika, all stuffed into casings and then cooked.

Burgos cheese is "a soft unripened cheese with an intense white color, no eyes and usually without bark or very thin crust, a native of Briviesca, a town that has an important livestock of sheep breeding." It is a well known European cheese. At first, it was made from raw sheep milk and animal rennet, seasoned with salt. Then it was put into clay jars and dried in cold, wet places. Nowadays, it is made from "pasteurized sheep's milk, cow or mixture of both." Extra salts and rennet are added after the cheese has been standing for about half an hour at about 84.2 degrees Fahrenheit. Once drained, the cheese can seep into a mold and become saltier. The cheese of Burgos is mostly saturated fatty acids and sometimes cholesterol. It does have a high water content and less fat, so it can be eaten in most diets. The cheese has many minerals and vitamins in it, such as calcium and phosphorus, and vitamins A and E. The whole population can eat this cheese. It is an essential ingredient in many recipes, served with honey and nuts.
