= Jurisdicción de Lara =

- Municipality
- Flag Coat of arms
- Interactive map of Jurisdicción de Lara
- Coordinates: 42.1347°N 3.4497°W
- Country: Spain
- Autonomous community: Castile and León
- Province: Burgos
- Comarca: Sierra de la Demanda
- Seat: Lara de los Infantes

Area
  - Total: 25 km^{2} (9.7 sq mi)
- Elevation: 1,015 m (3,330 ft)

Population (2025-01-01)
  - Total: 39
  - Density: 1.6/km^{2} (4.0/sq mi)
- Time zone: UTC+1 (CET)
  - Summer (DST): UTC+2 (CEST)
- Postal code: 09650
- Website: http://www.jurisdicciondelara.es/

Jurisdicción de Lara (Spanish pronunciation: [xuɾisðiɣˈθjon de ˈlaɾa]) is a municipality in the province of Burgos, Castile and León, Spain. It had a population of 59 at the 2004 census (INE).

The municipality is made up of three towns: Lara de los Infantes (seat or capital), Aceña de Lara and Paúles de Lara.

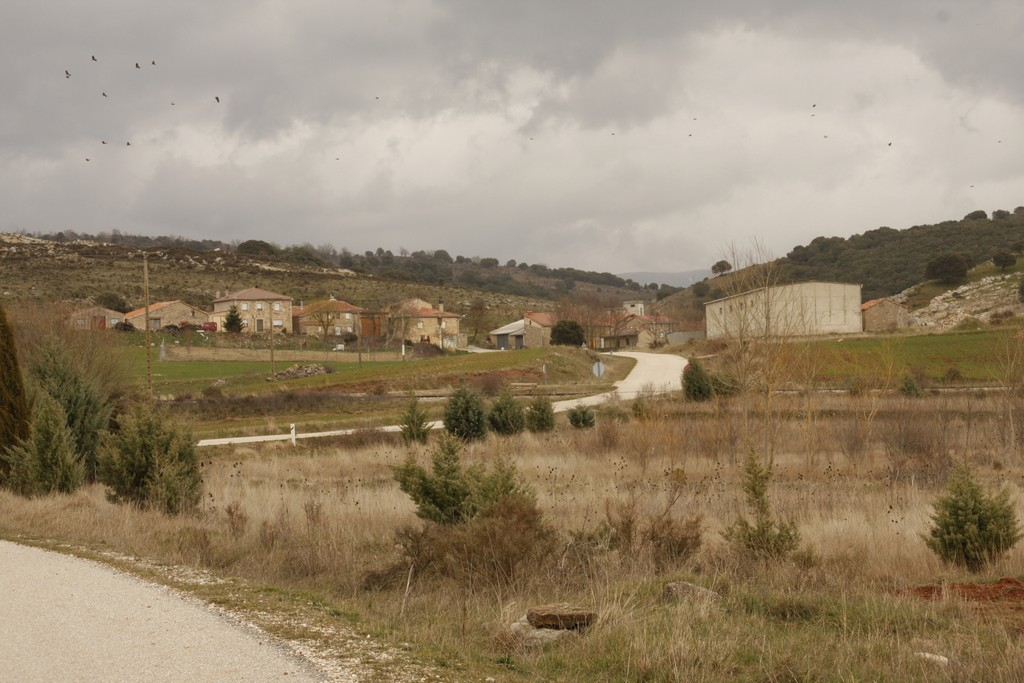
View of Aceña de Lara, Town in Jurisdicción de Lara
