= Barbadillo del Pez =

Coordinates: 42°07′N 3°14′W

- Municipality and town
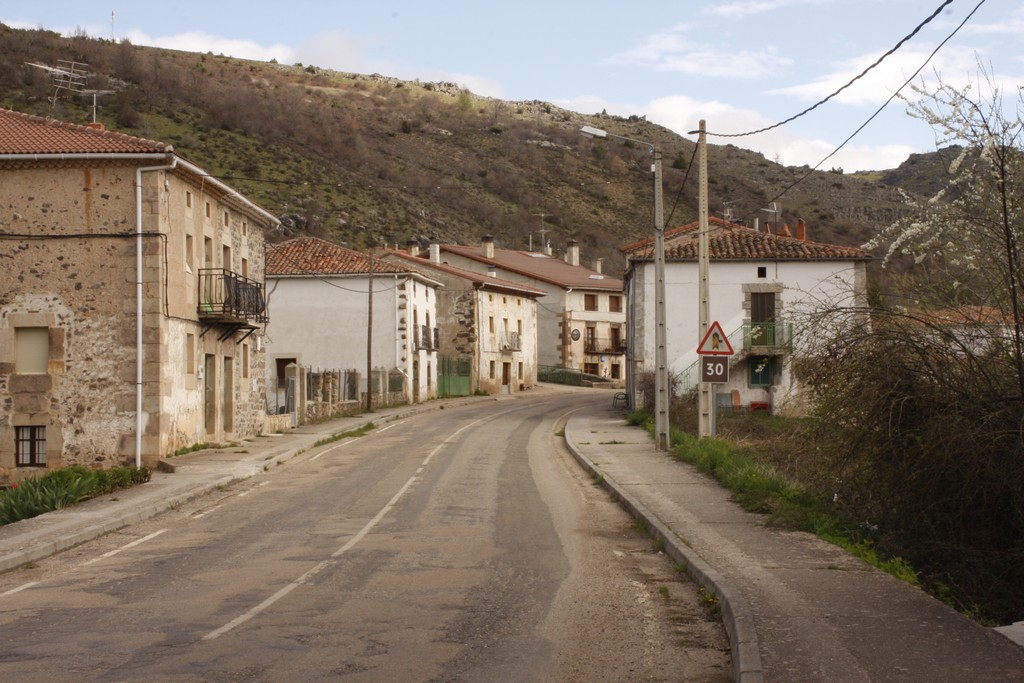
- View of Barbadillo del Pez, 2010
- Interactive map of Barbadillo del Pez
- Country: Spain
- Autonomous community: (Castile and León) Castilla y León
- Provincia: Burgos
- Comarca: Sierra de la Demanda

Area
  - Total: 20.76 km^{2} (8.02 sq mi)
- Elevation: 1,049 m (3,442 ft)

Population (2025-01-01)
  - Total: 64
  - Density: 3.1/km^{2} (8.0/sq mi)
- Time zone: UTC+1 (CET)
  - Summer (DST): UTC+2 (CEST)
- Postal code: 09614
- Website: http://www.barbadillodelpez.es/

Barbadillo del Pez is a municipality and town located in the province of Burgos, Castile and León, Spain. According to the 2007 census (INE), the municipality has a population of 82 inhabitants.
