= Neila =

Municipality and town in Spain

Coordinates: 42°04′N 3°00′W

- Municipality
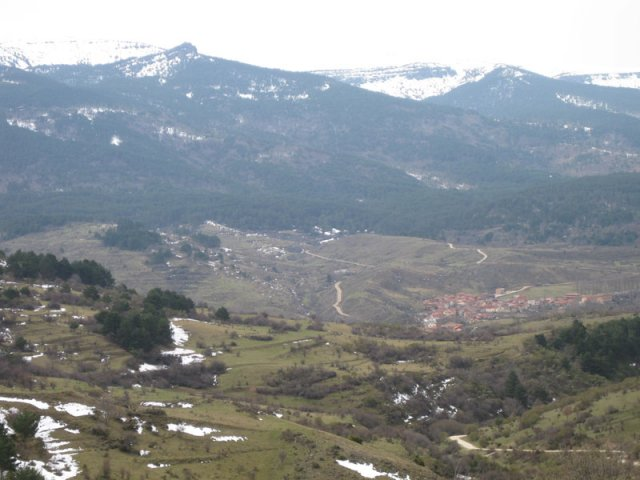
- View of Neila from Riofrío

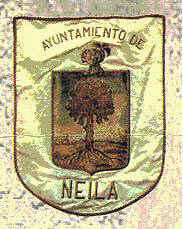
- Coat of arms
- Nickname: neila
- Interactive map of Neila
- Country: Spain
- Autonomous community: Castile and León
- Province: Burgos
- Comarca: Sierra de la Demanda

Area
  - Total: 68 km^{2} (26 sq mi)
- Elevation: 1,175 m (3,855 ft)

Population (2025-01-01)
  - Total: 113
  - Density: 1.7/km^{2} (4.3/sq mi)
- Time zone: UTC+1 (CET)
  - Summer (DST): UTC+2 (CEST)
- Postal code: 09679
- Website: www.villaneila.com http://www.neila.es/

Neila is a municipality and town located in the province of Burgos, Castile and León, Spain. According to the 2004 census (INE), the municipality has a population of 235 inhabitants.
