= Abbey of Santo Domingo de Silos =

Benedictine monastery in Santo Domingo village, northern Spain

Coordinates: 41°58′N 3°25′W

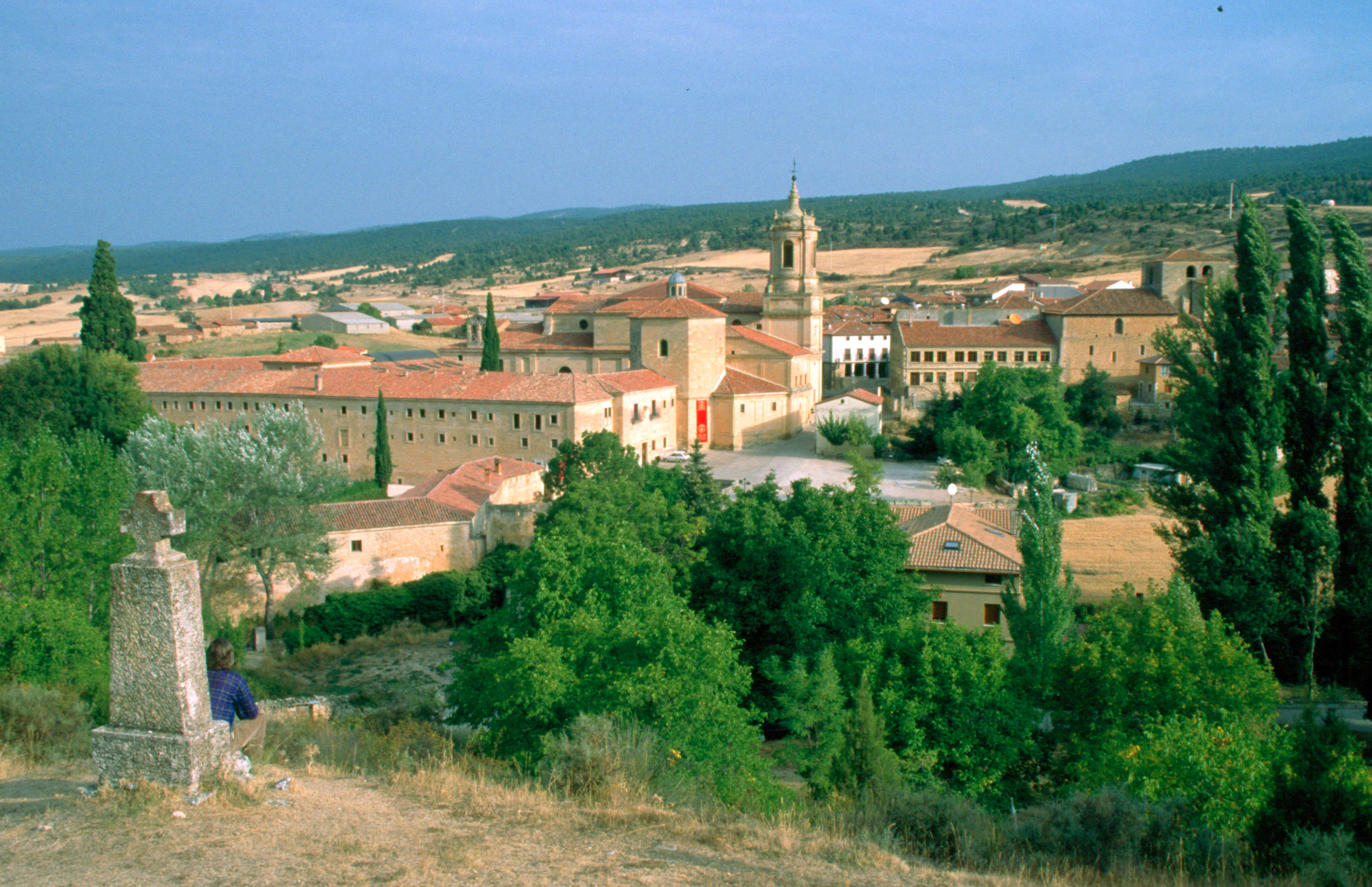
The general view

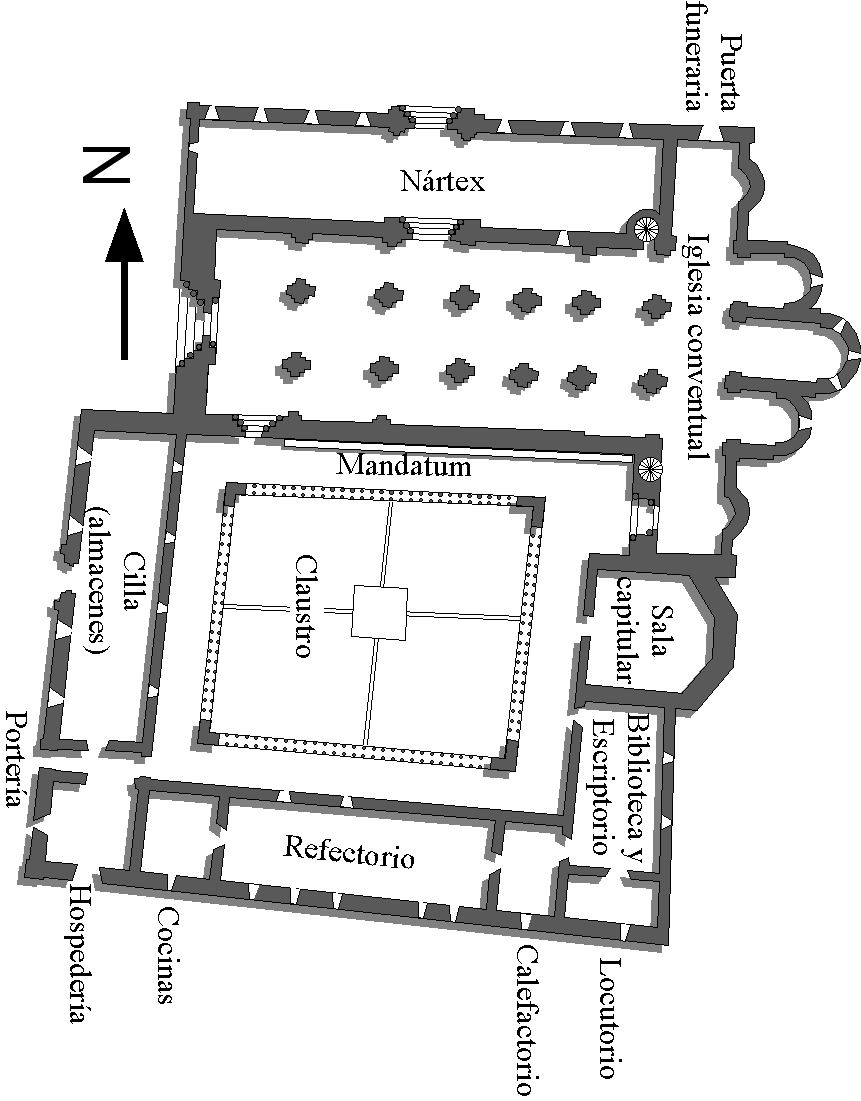
Plan of monastery

Santo Domingo de Silos Abbey (Spanish: Abadía del Monasterio de Santo Domingo de Silos) is a Benedictine monastery in the village of Santo Domingo de Silos in the southern part of Burgos Province in northern Spain. The monastery is named after the eleventh-century saint Dominic of Silos.

== History ==
The monastery dates back to the Visigothic period of the 7th century. In the 10th century, the abbey was called San Sebastián de Silos, but acquired its current name when Dominic of Silos was entrusted to renovate the abbey by Fernando the Great, King of Castile and León. Dominic had been prior of the Monasteries of San Millán de la Cogolla before being driven out with two of his fellow monks by King García Sánchez III of Navarre, for opposing the king's intention to annex the monastery's lands.

The abbot designed the church to have a central nave with two side aisles and five chapels attached to its apse and transept. When Santo Domingo died in 1073, work on the church and the cloister was handed over to Abbot Fortunius, who saw the rest of the construction to its completion. The church was subsequently rebuilt by the neoclassical architect Ventura Rodríguez.

In 1835 the abbey of Silos was closed, along with other monasteries in Spain. Benedictine monks from Solesmes in France revived the foundation in 1880.

== Romanesque architecture and sculpture ==
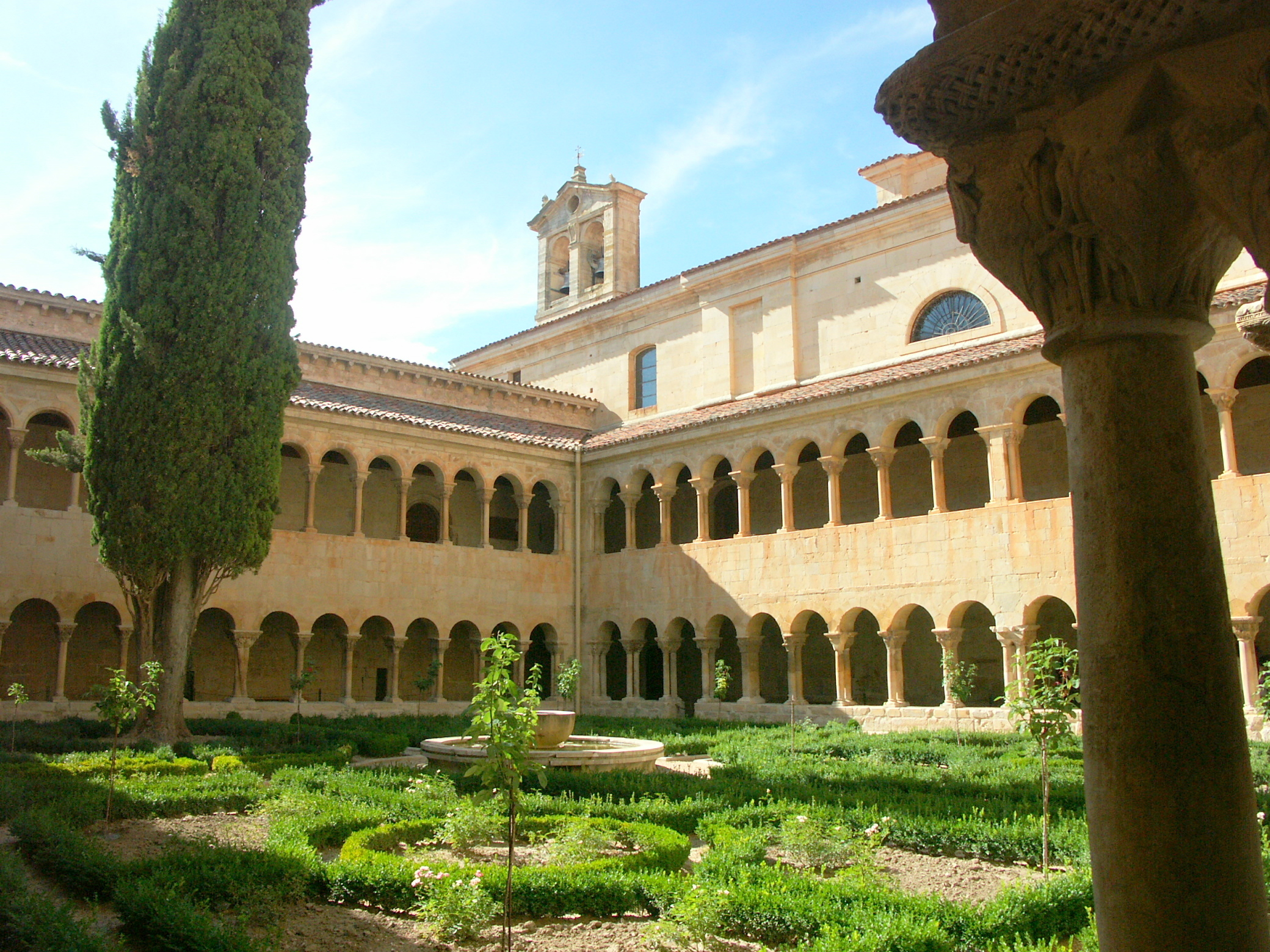
The cloister with twisted columns

The two-storey cloister of the monastery, which has large capitals with carved scenes, and also relief panels, is considered a masterpiece of Romanesque art, and has been written about extensively, notably by Meyer Schapiro in his Romanesque Art (1977). The capitals in the lower cloister are decorated with dragons, centaurs, lattices, and mermaids. There is also an important Romanesque free-standing enthroned Madonna and Child. The cloisters are the only surviving part of the monastery that hasn't changed since its inception. The cloister is an angled rectangular shape with 16 semi-circular arches on the north and south sides and 14 semi-circular arches on the west and east sides. The lower storey was begun during the last quarter of the 11th century and completed in the second half of the 12th century. The lower storey's date derives from an epitaph of the eponymous Santo Domingo, who died in 1073, which is located on the abacus of a group of four capitals in the north gallery. The cloister was dedicated on September 29, 1088. Additionally, the upper story of the cloister, which was placed upon the wooden vaulting of the first story, was completed during the 12th century.

Abbot Domingo's successor, Abbot Fortunius was in charge of the construction of the north gallery and the original west gallery. After completion of two of the galleries and the beginning stages of construction of a third gallery, Fortunius was forced to halt construction on the cloister due to the influx of pilgrims coming to visit Abbot Domingo's shrine. Additionally, construction on the cloister was halted for several decades because of political and economic difficulties during the period of 1109 to 1120. As a result of this interruption, it is clear that the west and south galleries are of a different style than the east and north galleries, which seem to indicate that a second, different workshop was hired after the intermission in construction to finish the work on the cloister.

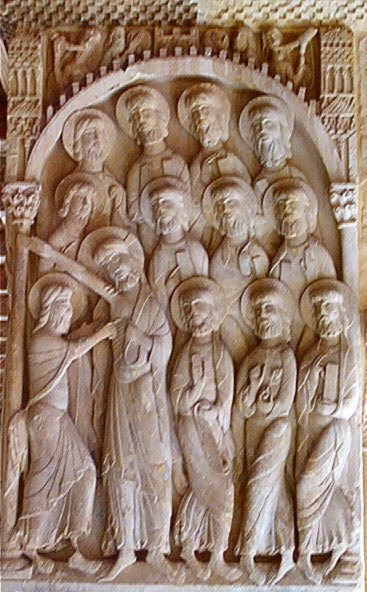
Carved panel from the cloisters showing Doubting Thomas

The organization of the cloister consists of four squared-off piers at each corner and paired columns running along each of the arcades. The arcades are mounted atop a podium that extends along each side of the cloister. Each of the sides of the cloister has a grouping of four columns located at the center of the arcade. The six-foot-tall piers have medium-relief sculptural biblical scenes of the Post-Passion which are the Three Marys Discovering Jesus Christ is Gone, the Pentecost, the Doubting Thomas, and the Road to Emmaus. Originally, these religious scenes were painted in bright colors. These pier carvings are dated to the middle of the twelfth century and are the work of the sculptor of the lower story capitals. The carved panels are thought to be the work of the same craftsman who worked on the Abbey of St. Pierre de Moissac in France.

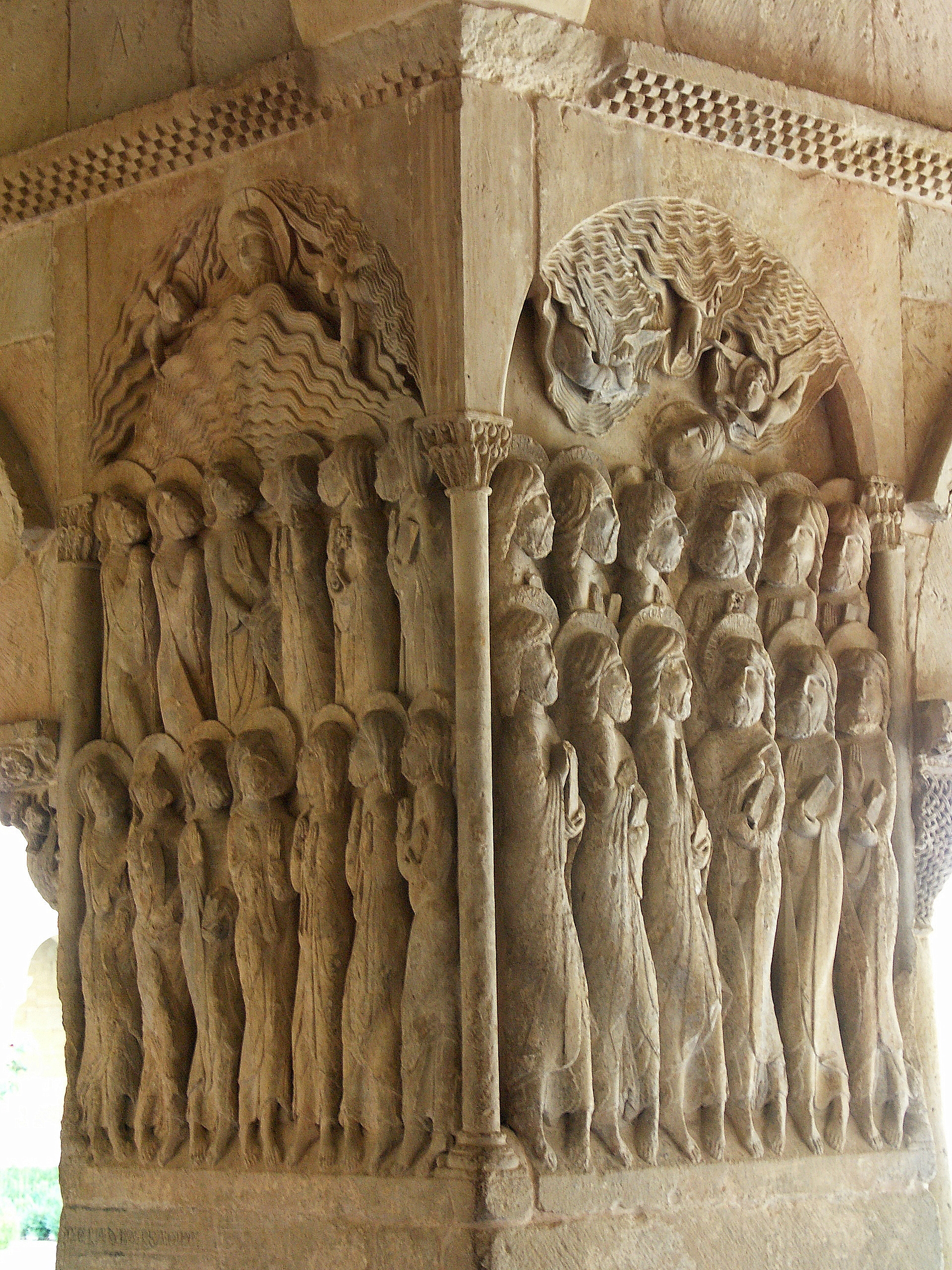
Pier relief of The Ascension and Pentecost

The southeast corner's pier relief depicts the Ascension and the Pentecost. The northeast corner's pier relief depicts the Entombment and the Descent from the Cross. The northwest corner's pier relief depicts the disciples of Emmaus. The southwest corner's pier reliefs depict the Annunciation to Mary and the Tree of Jesse.

The paired columns along each side of the cloister each share a capital. Each capital's decoration is unique, and they contain a variety of animals, foliage or an abstract design. Due to the later date of their creation, the capitals on the second story of the cloister depict narrative scenes. All of the east gallery's capitals and most of the capitals in the north gallery were carved by the same sculptural workshop. The east gallery was the first to be finished, and it was followed by the completion of the north gallery. After the intermission of construction on the cloister, work was resumed in 1158. The south gallery was completed soon after, and the newly reconstructed west gallery was the last side of the cloister to be finished. Before the west gallery was completed, plans were made to construct the second story of the cloister. It is believed that the lower story's sculptural style is of better quality than that of the upper story.

== Library ==
Together with the library of Toledo Cathedral, the Silos Library was the main repository of liturgical manuscripts of the Mozarabic rite until many were auctioned in 1878. The library still contains the Missal of Silos, the oldest Western manuscript on paper. There is a historic pharmacy with a specialist library.

=== Silos scriptorium ===
Some manuscripts from the Silos scriptorium are preserved at the British Library in London and the Bibliothèque nationale de France in Paris. One of the major books produced in the abbey was a finely illuminated Beatus manuscript (a commentary upon the Apocalypse); the text was completed (by two related monks) in 1091, but the illuminations (illustrations) were mostly done later by the prior, who finished his work in 1109. These include an important map of the Mediterranean regions. This is now in the British Library, having left the monastery by the 18th century.

== Music in the abbey ==
The monks originally sang Mozarabic chant. At some point around the eleventh century they switched to Gregorian chant. In 1880 the abbey became a member of the Solesmes Congregation, which has a strong tradition of singing Gregorian chant. The singing at Santo Domingo de Silos has been influenced by the scholarship and performance style of Solesmes Abbey.

=== Recordings ===
==== Gregorian chant ====
The monks of Silos became internationally famous for singing Gregorian chant as a result of the remarkable success of their 1994 album Chant, one of a number of recordings by the choir which have been released commercially.

Chant peaked at #3 on the Billboard 200 music chart, and was certified as triple platinum, becoming the best-selling album of Gregorian chant ever released. It was followed by Chant Noël: Chants for the Holiday Season (also released in 1994) and Chant II (1995). Technically, the Silos monks are surpassed by other choirs, but they are undoubtedly authentic in the sense that they sing Gregorian chant as part of their daily worship. As a reviewer in Gramophone puts it: "The ensemble is not always perfect, but if these are not professional singers, they are, and they sound like, truly professional monks."

==== Mozarabic chant ====
Along with Ensemble Organum, the monks of Silos are one of the few choirs to have recorded Mozarabic chant, for example on a 1970 album for German early music/baroque label Archiv Produktion.

== Access for the public ==
The cloisters and pharmacy are open to the public. Visitors are also able to attend services such as vespers in the abbey church. Access to the library is restricted to researchers.

== Sources ==
- Schapiro, Meyer, From Mozarabic to Romanesque in Silos, in Selected Papers, volume 2, Romanesque Art, 1977, Chatto & Windus, London, ISBN 0-7011-2239-0
- Álvaro Castresana López, Una inscripción hermética en el claustro románico de Santo Domingo de Silos: un díptico elegíaco inédito", en Latinidad medieval hispánica / coord. por Juan-Francisco Mesa Sanz, 2017, ISBN 978-88-8450-708-2, págs. 425-430.
