= Sierra de la Demanda (comarca) =

Coordinates: 42.0063°N 3.2654°W

- Comarca
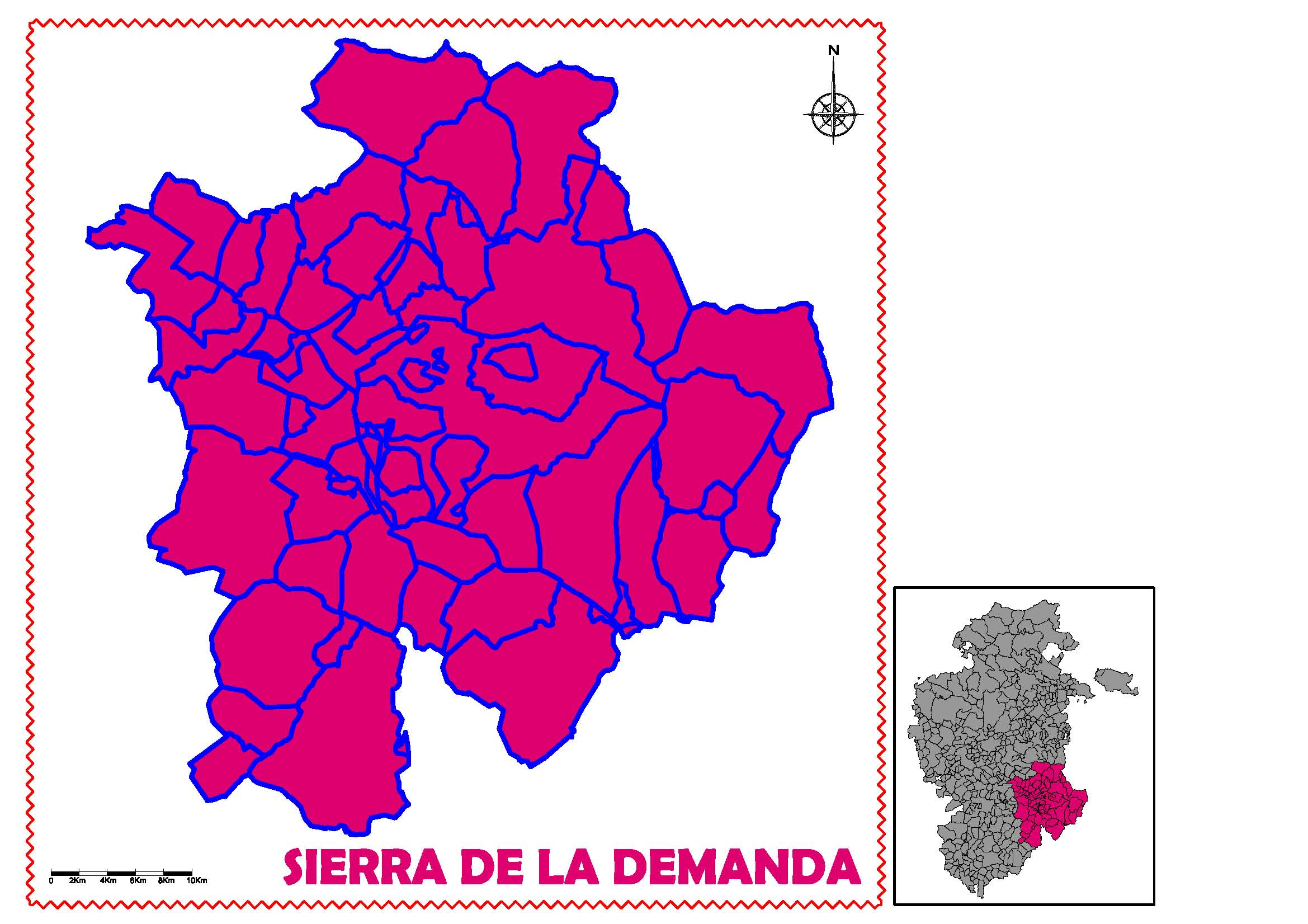
- Country: Spain
- Autonomous community: Castile and León
- Province: Burgos
- Capital: Salas de los Infantes
- Time zone: UTC+1 (CET)
  - Summer (DST): UTC+2 (CEST)
- Largest municipality: Salas de los Infantes

Sierra de la Demanda is a comarca located south-east of the province of Burgos in the autonomous community of Castile and León, Spain. It is bounded on the north-east by the Montes de Oca comarca, north-west by the Alfoz de Burgos, south-east by the province of Soria, south-west by the Ribera del Duero comarca, on the east by the province of La Rioja and west by the Arlanza comarca. It is named after the mountain sub-range of Sierra de la Demanda, the northwesternmost end of the Sistema Ibérico.

== Administrative entities ==
The comarca capital and biggest town is Salas de los Infantes.

=== Municipalities ===
There are 39 municipalities. In parentheses is the number of minor local entities within each municipality.

- Arauzo de Miel
- Arauzo de Salce
- Arauzo de Torre
- Barbadillo de Herreros
- Barbadillo del Mercado
- Barbadillo del Pez
- Cabezón de la Sierra
- Canicosa de la Sierra
- Carazo
- Cascajares de la Sierra
- Castrillo de la Reina
- Contreras
- Covarrubias
- Hacinas
- Hontoria del Pinar (2)
- Hortigüela
- Huerta de Arriba
- Huerta de Rey (3)
- Jurisdicción de Lara (3)
- Jaramillo de la Fuente
- La Gallega
- La Revilla y Ahedo
- Mamolar
- Monasterio de la Sierra
- Moncalvillo
- Monterrubio de la Demanda
- Neila
- Palacios de la Sierra
- Pinilla de los Barruecos
- Pinilla de los Moros
- Quintanar de la Sierra
- Rabanera del Pinar
- Regumiel de la Sierra
- Riocavado de la Sierra
- Salas de los Infantes (4)
- Valle de Valdelaguna (5)
- Villanueva de Carazo
- Vilviestre del Pinar
- Vizcaínos

== See also ==
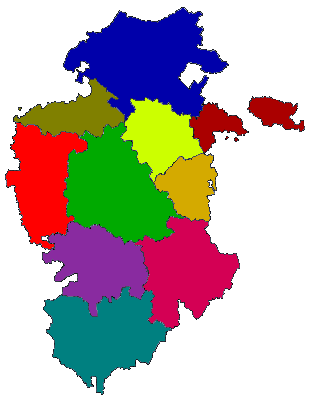
Shires of Burgos.: Páramos Alfoz de Burgos Odra y Pisuerga Arlanza Ribera del Duero / Merindades Ebro La Bureba Montes de Oca Sierra de la Demanda

- Province of Burgos
