= European Rogaining Championships =

The European Rogaining Championships is an annual top level event to establish the European champions in rogaining. The championships are organised by a national rogaining association chosen by the European members of the International Rogaining Federation (IRF).

European championship rogaines are of 24 hours duration, and are conducted in accordance with the rogaining rules of the IRF. The team with the highest score in each of the three gender classes (Men's, Women's and Mixed teams) are declared the European Rogaining Champions. Within each gender class, all teams participate in the Open age category. Additionally, there are age sub-categories as follows: Youth (up to 23), Veteran (45 and over), Super Veteran (55 and over) and Ultra Veteran (65 and over).

== History of the European Rogaining Championships ==
European rogaining champions in Open categories
No	Year	Country	Place	Number of teams	Men's teams	Women's teams	Mixed teams
1	2003	Russia	Perm	40	Miroslav Seidl (Czech Republic) , Petr Bořánek (Czech Republic)	Elena Bondar (Russia) , Inna Zhabreeva (Russia)	Olga Tvorogova (Russia) , Nikolay Mironov (Russia)
2	2005	Estonia	Nõva	89	Jaanus Reha (Estonia) , Margus Klementsov (Estonia)	Ulla Silventoinen (Finland) , Maija Aatsinki (Finland)	Anita Liepiņa (Latvia) , Guntars Mankus (Latvia)
3	2006	Ukraine	Chernivtsi	104	Oleg Kalinin (Russia) , Sergey Yashchenko (Russia)	Ilze Lapina (Latvia) , Zane Rozenbaha (Latvia)	Inguna Valdmane (Latvia) , Gints Trezins (Latvia)
4	2007	Latvia	Smiltene	162	Evgeny Gavrilov (Russia) , Evgeny Dombrovskiy (Russia)	Alīda Ābola (Latvia) , Baiba Ozola (Latvia)	Elena Bondar (Russia) , Nikolay Bondar (Russia)
5	2008	Russia	Michurinskoye	143	Miroslav Seidl (Czech Republic) , Petr Bořánek (Czech Republic)	Anna Burlinova (Russia) , Irina Safronova (Russia)	Alīda Ābola (Latvia) , Peteris Zarinš (Latvia)
6	2009	Finland	Ylläs	240	Janne Mononen (Finland) , Eero Jäppinen (Finland)	Alīda Ābola (Latvia) , Ilze Lapina (Latvia)	Elena Bondar (Russia) , Andrey Shvedov (Russia)
7	2010	Ukraine	Migovo	123	Hannu Oja (Finland) , Seppo Mäkinen (Finland)	Olga Mazur (Ukraine) , Ludmila Yaremenko (Ukraine)	Natalya Abramova (Russia) , Andrey Shvedov (Russia)
8	2011	Latvia	Rauna	282	Silver Eensaar (Estonia) , Rain Eensaar (Estonia)	Marina Galkina (Russia) , Nina Mikheeva (Russia)	Natalya Abramova (Russia) , Andrey Shvedov (Russia)
9	2012	Lithuania	Moletai	171	Armo Hiie (Estonia) , Lauri Lahtmäe (Estonia)	Marina Galkina (Russia) , Nina Mikheeva (Russia)	Anita Liepiņa (Latvia) , Valters Kaminskis (Latvia)
10	2013	Spain	La Llacuna	169	Tommi Tölkkö (Finland) , Antonio Aurelio Olivar (Spain)	Marina Galkina (Russia) , Nina Mikheeva (Russia)	Anita Liepiņa (Latvia) , Valters Kaminskis (Latvia)
11	2014	Estonia	Orava	289	Timmo Tammemäe (Estonia) , Rait Pallo (Estonia)	Natalia Zimina (Russia) , Anna Burlinova (Russia)	Nadezda Ermakova (Russia) , Artem Rostovtsev (Russia)
12	2015	Czech Republic	Černé Údolí	185	Riivo Roose (Estonia) , Sander Mirme (Estonia)	Aiva Jakovela (Latvia) , Alda Brazune (Latvia)	Anita Liepina (Latvia) , Valters Kaminskis (Latvia)
13	2016	Spain	Aralar	198	Roman Horyna (Czech Republic) , Radovan Čech (Czech Republic)	Eleri Hirv (Estonia) , Mariann Sulg (Estonia)	Irita Pukite (Latvia) , Guntars Mankus (Latvia)
14	2017	Italy	San Gimignano	136	Albert Herrero (Spain) , Antonio Aurelio Olivar (Spain)	Polina Zakharova (Ukraine) , Ekaterina Dzema (Ukraine)	Mari Kaseväli (Estonia) , Toomas Marrandi (Estonia)
15	2018	Ukraine	Berehomet	139	Timmo Tammemäe (Estonia) , Sander Linnus (Estonia)	Piibe Tammemäe (Estonia) , Eleri Hirv (Estonia)	Irina Voitovich (Ukraine) , Taras Melnyk (Ukraine) , Artem Slotin (Ukraine)
16	2020	Latvia	Milzkalne	245	Timmo Tammemäe (Estonia) , Sander Linnus (Estonia)	Piibe Tammemäe (Estonia) , Hannula-Katrin Pandis (Estonia)	Natalia Zimina (Russia) , Igor Manzhay (Russia) , Oleg Kalinin (Russia)
17	2021	Estonia	Otepää	224	Timmo Tammemäe (Estonia) , Sander Linnus (Estonia)	Piibe Tammemäe (Estonia) , Hannula-Katrin Pandis (Estonia)	Ain Fjodorov (Estonia) , Reeda Tuula-Fjodorov (Estonia)
18	2022	Russia	cancelled	-	-	-	-
19	2023	Finland	Pöytyä	221	Timmo Tammemäe (Estonia) , Sander Linnus (Estonia)	Mariann Sulg (Estonia) , Maris Terno (Estonia)	Rain Eensaar (Estonia) , Reeda Tuula-Fjodorov (Estonia)
20	2024	Estonia	Misso	193	Timmo Tammemäe (Estonia) , Sander Linnus (Estonia)	Hannula-Katrin Pandis (Estonia) , Margret Zimmermann (Estonia)	Ain Fjodorov (Estonia) , Reeda Tuula-Fjodorov (Estonia)
21	2026	Czech Republic	Orlické Záhoří	213	Timmo Tammemäe (Estonia) , Sander Linnus (Estonia)	Mariann Sulg (Estonia) , Kersti Jääger (Estonia)	Dariia Bodnar (Ukraine) , Yevhenii Bryndak (Ukraine) , Bohdan Vorobets (Ukraine)
22	2027	Romania	Predeal				

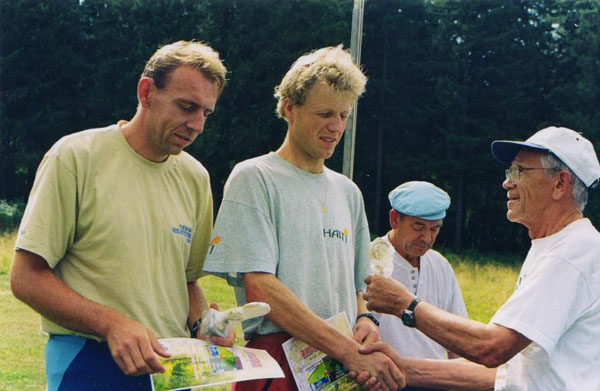
1st European Rogaining Championships 2003. Prize giving ceremony. From left: Petr Bořánek, Miroslav Seidl (Czech Republic)

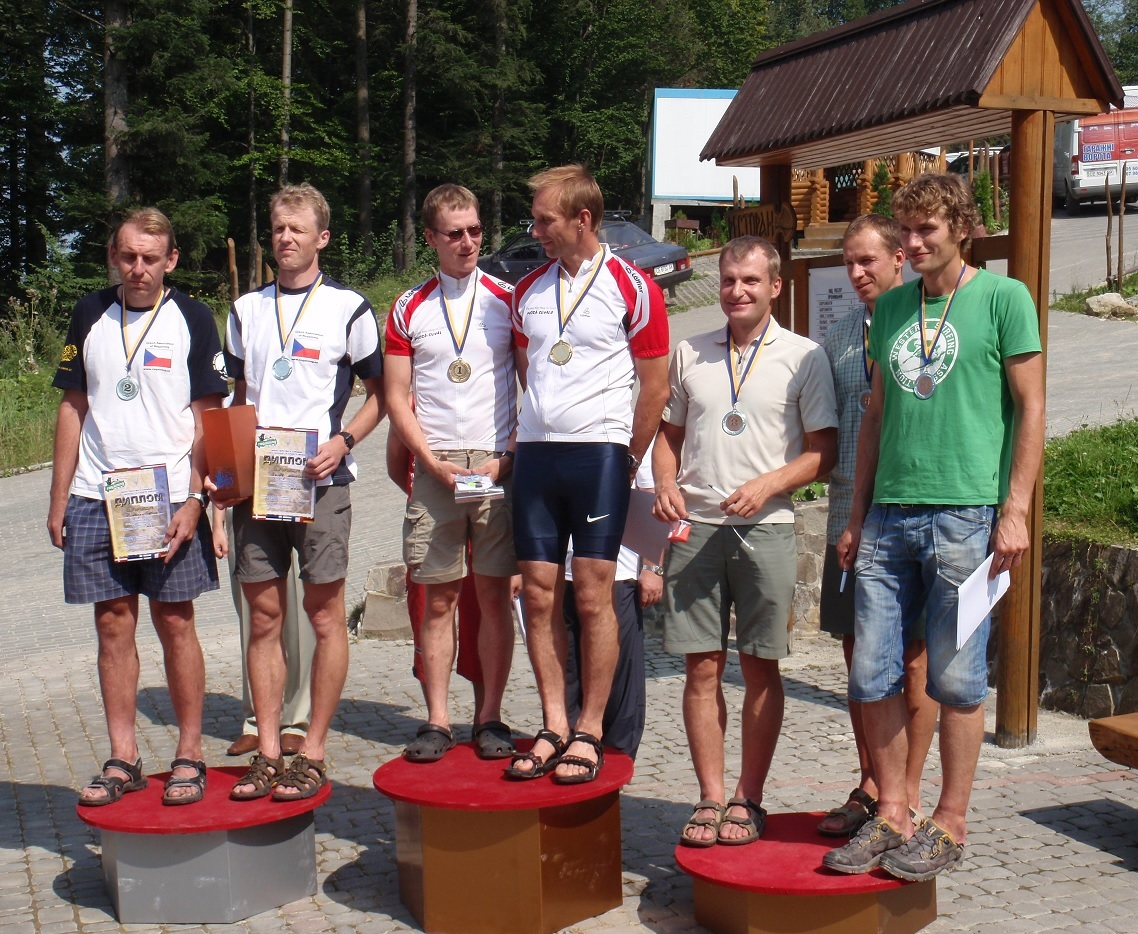
European Rogaining Championships 2010 Men's Open winners. From left: Petr Bořánek, Miroslav Seidl – silver (Czech Republic), Hannu Oja, Seppo Mäkinen – gold (Finland), Karli Lambot, Rait Pallo, Tõnu Lillelaid – bronze (Estonia)

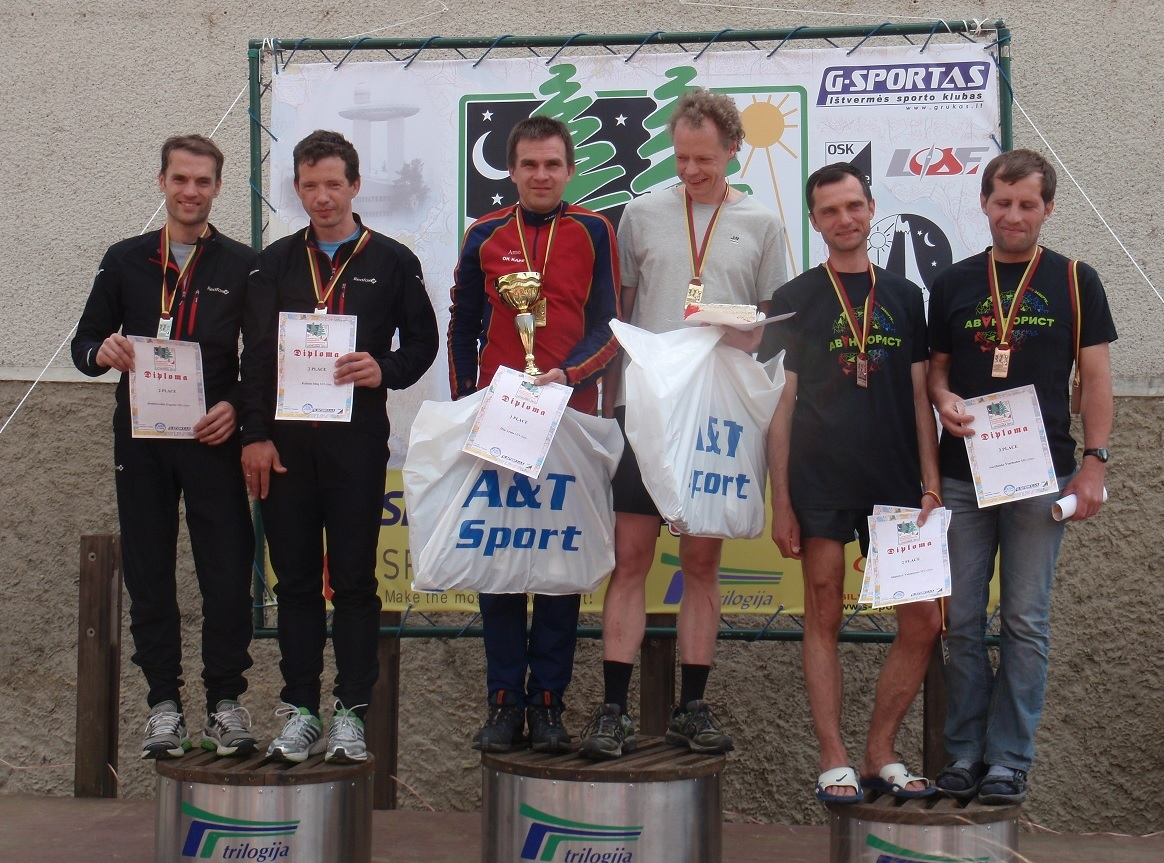
European Rogaining Championships 2012 Men's Open winners. From left: Evgeny Dombrovski, Oleg Kalinin – silver (Russia), Armo Hiie, Lauri Lahtmäe – gold (Estonia), Volodymyr Shpetnyy, Viacheslav Savchenko – bronze (respectively Ukraine and Russia)

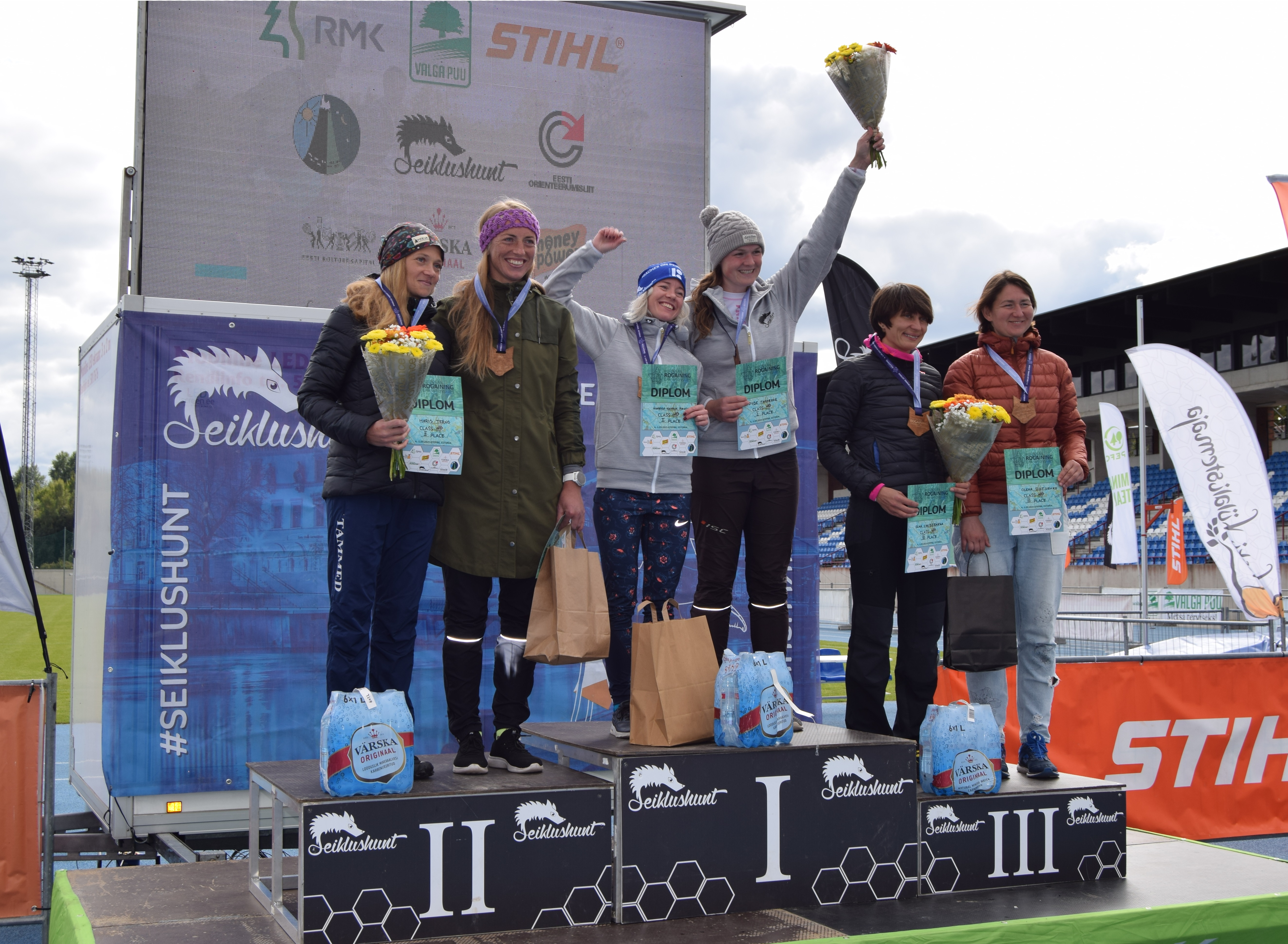
European Rogaining Championships 2021 Women's Open winners. From left: Maris Terno, Mariann Sulg – silver (Estonia), Hannula-Katrin Pandis, Piibe Tammemäe – gold (Estonia), Olha Cheberakha, Olena Dotsenko – bronze (Ukraine)

== See also ==
World Rogaining Championships
