= World Rogaining Championships =

IRF championship event

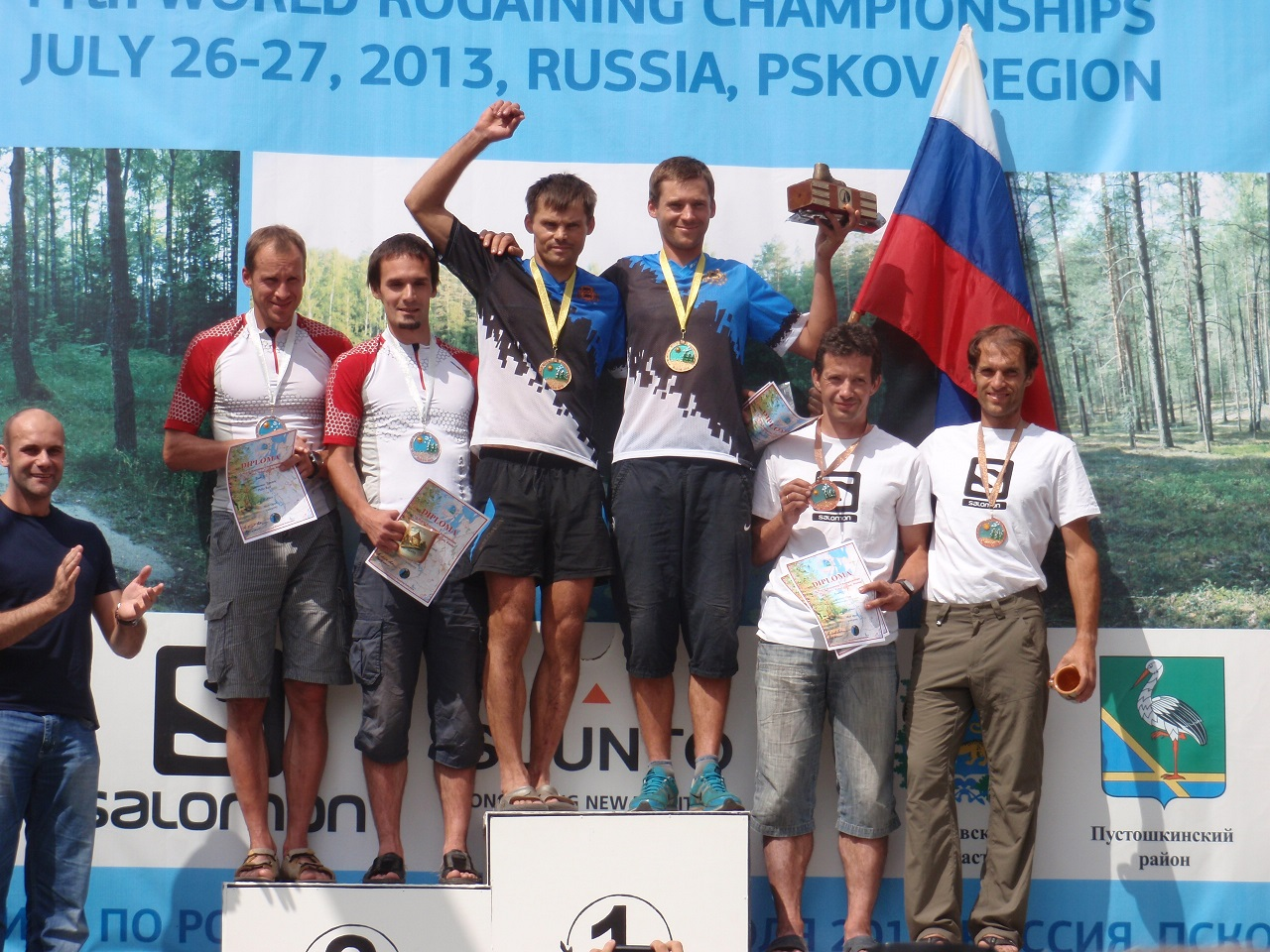
World Rogaining Championships 2013 Men's Open winners. From left: Rait Pallo, Timmo Tammemäe – silver (Estonia), Rain Eensaar, Silver Eensaar – gold (Estonia), Oleg Kalinin, Evgeny Dombrovskiy – bronze (Russia)

The World Rogaining Championships are the championships of the International Rogaining Federation (IRF) and the pinnacle rogaining event in the world. The championships are organised by the national rogaining organisation chosen by the IRF as the host of that particular championships.

World championship rogaines are always of 24 hours duration, and are conducted in accordance with standard rogaining rules.

The team with the highest score in each of the three gender classes (Men's, Women's and Mixed teams) are declared the World Rogaining Champions. Within each gender class, all teams participate in the Open age category. Additionally, there are age sub-categories as follows: Youth (up to 23), Veteran (45 and over), Super Veteran (55 and over) and Ultra Veteran (65 and over).

From 1992 to 2012 the World Rogaining Championships were held every two years, from 2012 to 2020 they have been held annually (with the exception of 2018), from 2020 onwards they are again held every other year.

== History of the Championships ==
No	Year	Country	Place	Number of teams	Men's teams	Women's teams	Mixed teams
1	1992	Australia	Beechworth	194	(Australia) James Russell, Michael Walters	(Australia) Drusilla Patkin, Alexandra Tyson	(Australia) Tony Woolford, Barb Gare
2	1996	Australia	Mt Singleton	271	(Australia) David Rowlands, James Russell	(Australia) Christine O'Keefe, Jenny Casanova	(Australia) David Ellis, John Nitschke, Vanessa Walker
3	1998	Canada	Kamloops	134	(Australia) Nigel Aylott, (Finland) Iiro Kakko	(Canada) Catherine Hagen, Pam James	(Australia) Richard Matthews, Helen Bailey
4	2000	New Zealand	Christchurch	193	(Australia) David Rowlands, (New Zealand) Greg Barbour	(New Zealand) Rachel Smith, (Spain) Encarna Maturana	(New Zealand) Rob Hart, Jenni Adams
5	2002	Czech Republic	Lesná	182	(Australia) David Rowlands, (New Zealand) Greg Barbour	(Australia) Julie Quinn, Kay Haarsma	(Latvia) Guntars Mankus, Raimonds Lapiņš, Anita Liepiņa
6	2004	United States	Arizona	176	(United States) Mike Kloser, Michael Tobin	(United States) Victoria Campbell, Jennifer Knowles	(Australia) David Baldwin, Julie Quinn
7	2006	Australia	Warrumbungles	308	(New Zealand) Dennis de Monchy, Chris Forne	(Australia) Heather Logie, Julie Quinn	(Latvia) Guntars Mankus, Raimonds Lapiņš, Anita Liepiņa
8	2008	Estonia	Karula National Park	339	(Russia) Evgeny Dombrovskiy, Pavel Shestakov	(Latvia) Alīda Ābola, Baiba Ozola	(Russia) Pavel Sysoev, Irina Safronova
9	2010	New Zealand	Cheviot	250	(New Zealand) Chris Forne, Marcel Hagener	(Australia) Gill Fowler, Alexa McAuley	(Finland) Seppo Mäkinen, Ulla Silventoinen
10	2012	Czech Republic	Prebuz	333	(Estonia) Silver Eensaar, Rain Eensaar	(Russia) Anastasia Galitarova, Irina Safronova	(Russia) Andrey Shvedov, Anna Shavlakova
11	2013	Russia	Alol	314	(Estonia) Silver Eensaar, Rain Eensaar	(Russia) Anna Shavlakova, Anastasia Rostovtseva	(Russia) Andrey Shvedov, Natalija Abramova
12	2014	(United States) USA	South Dakota	180	(Estonia) Silver Eensaar, Rain Eensaar, Timmo Tammemäe	(Russia) Marina Galkina, Nina Mikheeva	(Estonia) Heiti Hallikma, Viivi-Anne Soots
13	2015	Finland	Saariselkä	374	(Finland) Petteri Muukkonen, Hannu-Pekka Pukema	(Russia) Anna Shavlakova, Natalija Abramova	(Russia) Konstantin Ivanov, Natalija Zimina
14	2016	Australia	Alice Springs	303	(New Zealand) Chris Forne, Greig Hamilton	(New Zealand) Georgia Whitla, Lara Prince	(Australia) Rob Preston, Kathryn Preston
15	2017	Latvia	Rāzna National Park	426	(Latvia) Jānis Krūmiņš, Andris Ansabergs	(Russia) Marina Galkina, Nina Mikheeva	(New Zealand) Georgia Whitla, Greig Hamilton
16	2019	Spain	La Molina, Catalonia	386	(Estonia) Timmo Tammemäe, Rain Seepõld	(Russia) Anna Burlinova, Maria Plyashechko	(Ukraine) Polina Zakharova, Artem Gorodynets, Ievgenii Tsyren
17	2022	Czech Republic	Paprsek	257	(Latvia) Andris Ansabergs, (Spain) Albert Herrero Casas	(Estonia) Mariann Sulg, Maris Terno	(Czech Republic) Jaroslav Najman, Marie Zelena
18	2023	(United States) USA	Northstar California	130	(Estonia) Timmo Tammemäe, Sander Linnus	(Ukraine) Polina Zakharova, Anna Hudelaitis	(Latvia) Guntars Mankus, Irita Pukite
19	2025	Spain	Quintanar de la Sierra	351	Maxim Tsvetkov, Semen Yakimov	Ekaterina Petukhova, Anna Shliapnikova	(Estonia) Silver Eensaar, Helen Jürjo
20	2027	Australia	Flinders Ranges, South Australia				

== Multiple winners ==
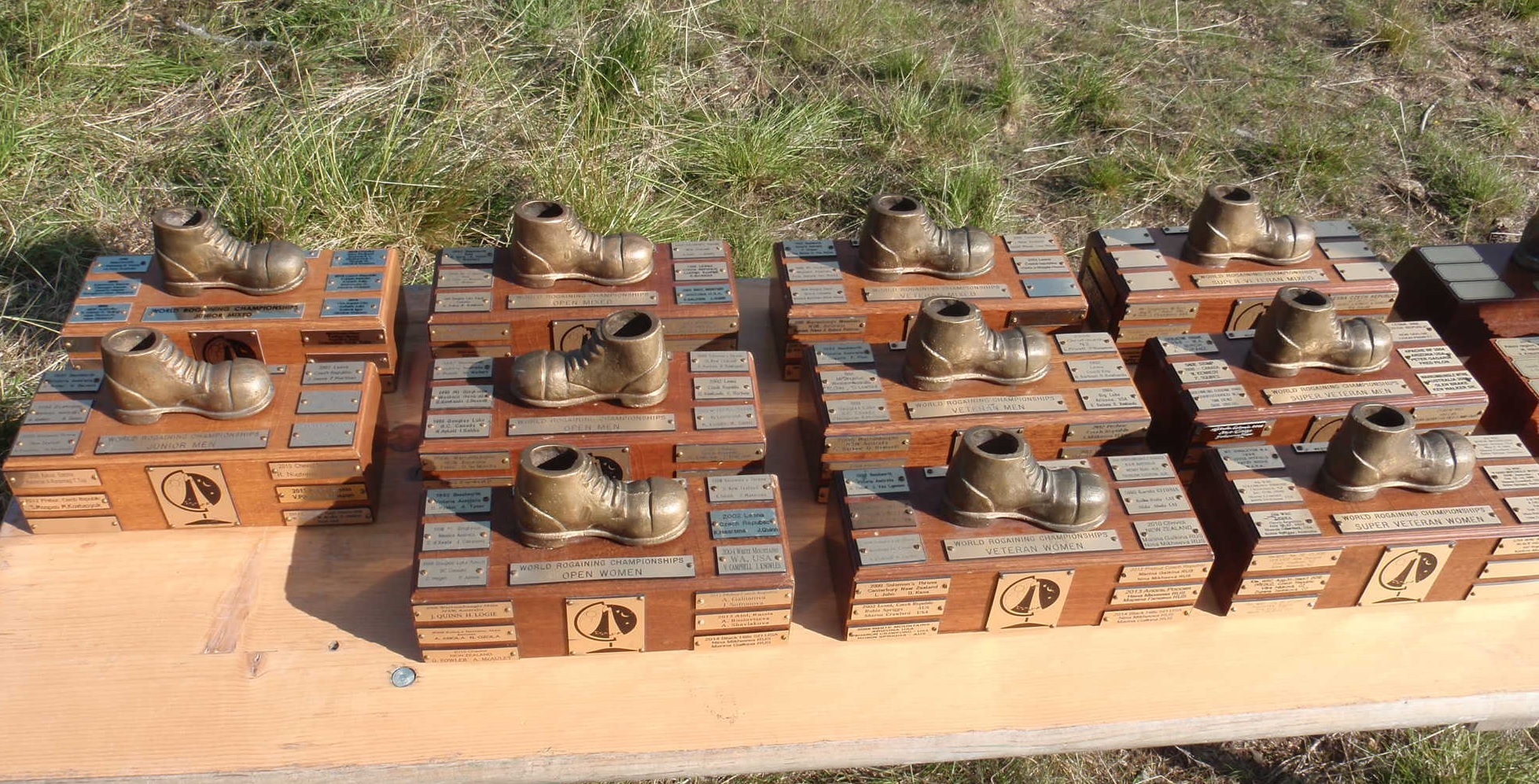
Perpetual trophies for World Rogaining Championship category winners

Men's (Estonia) Silver Eensaar - 3 (Estonia) Rain Eensaar - 3 (Estonia) Timmo Tammemäe - 3 (Australia) David Rowlands - 3 (New Zealand) Chris Forne - 3 (New Zealand) Greg Barbour - 2 (Australia) James Russell - 2

Women's (Russia) Anna Shavlakova - 2 (Australia) Julie Quinn - 2 (Russia) Marina Galkina - 2 (Russia) Nina Mikheeva - 2

Mixed (Latvia) Guntars Mankus - 3 (Latvia) Raimonds Lapiņš - 2 (Latvia) Anita Liepiņa - 2 (Russia) Andrey Shvedov - 2

Overall (Estonia) Silver Eensaar - 4 (Australia) Julie Quinn - 3 (Australia) David Rowlands - 3 (Estonia) Rain Eensaar - 3 (Estonia) Timmo Tammemäe - 3 (Latvia) Guntars Mankus - 3 (New Zealand) Chris Forne - 3 (Russia) Anna Shavlakova - 3 (Australia) James Russell - 2 (Russia) Natalija Abramova - 2 (Russia) Irina Safronova - 2 (Russia) Andrey Shvedov - 2 (Russia) Marina Galkina - 2 (Russia) Nina Mikheeva - 2 (New Zealand) Greg Barbour - 2 (New Zealand) Georgia Whitla - 2 (New Zealand) Greig Hamilton - 2 (Latvia) Raimonds Lapiņš - 2 (Latvia) Anita Liepiņa - 2 (Latvia) Andris Ansabergs - 2 (Ukraine) Polina Zakharova - 2

== See also ==
European Rogaining Championships
