= Guntars Mankus =

Latvian orienteer, rogainer and adventure racer

Medal record

Representing Latvia

Rogaining

World Championships
Gold medal – first place	2002 Lesná, Czech R.	Mixed Open
Gold medal – first place	2006 Warrumbungles, Australia	Mixed Open
Gold medal – first place	2023 Sierra Nevada, USA	Mixed Open
Silver medal – second place	2015 Kiilopää, Finland	Mixed Open
Bronze medal – third place	2004 Arizona, United States	Mixed Open

European Championships
Gold medal – first place	2005 Nõva, Estonia	Mixed Open
Gold medal – first place	2016 Aralar, Spain	Mixed Open

Trail orienteering

World Championships
Gold medal – first place	2014 Lavarone, Italy	PreO Open
Bronze medal – third place	2014 Lavarone, Italy	PreO Team

Guntars Mankus (born 5 July 1969), is a Latvian orienteer, rogainer and adventure racer.

At the 5th World Rogaining Championships in Lesná, Czech Republic in 2002, he won a gold medal and the title of the World Rogaining Champion in Mixed Open category in team with Anita Liepina and Raimonds Lapiņš. At 6th World Rogaining Championships in Arizona, United States in 2004, the same team won a bronze medal in Mixed Open category. At 7th World Rogaining Championships in Warrumbungles, Australia, they regained the title of the World Rogaining Champion in Mixed Open category. At 13th World Rogaining Championships in Kiilopää, Finland he won a silver medal in Mixed Open category in team with Irita Puķīte. At 18th World Rogaining Championships in Sierra Nevada, California, USA, he won a gold medal in Mixed Open category in team with Irita Puķīte.

In 2005, he won a gold medal at the European Rogaining Championships in Mixed Open category in team with Anita Liepina in Nõva, Estonia. In 2016, he won a gold medal at the European Rogaining Championships in Mixed Open category in team with Irita Puķīte in Aralar Range, Spain.

In 2014, he won a gold medal and the title of the World Champion in precision orienteering (PreO Open) and a bronze medal as a member of the Latvian team at the World Trail Orienteering Championships in Lavarone, Italy.
