= Eensaar =

Estonian family name

Eensaar is an Estonian surname. Notable people with the surname include:

- Rain Eensaar (born 1974), Estonian orienteer, rogainer and adventure racer
- Silver Eensaar (born 1978), Estonian orienteer, rogainer and adventure racer
