= Silver Eensaar =

Estonian orienteer, rogainer, and adventure racer

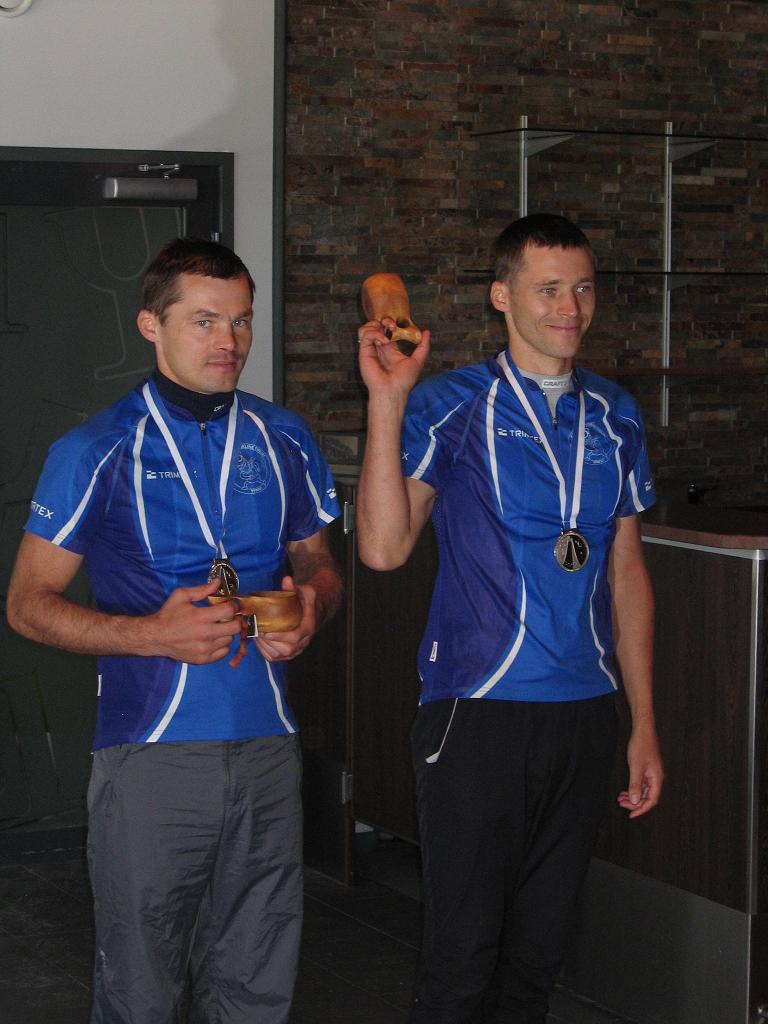
- Rain (left) and Silver Eensaar (right)

Personal information
- Born: 29 July 1978 (age 47) Tartu, then part of Estonian SSR, Soviet Union
Medal record
Representing Estonia
World Rogaining Championships
Gold medal – first place	2012 Přebuz, Czech R.	Men's Open
Gold medal – first place	2013 Alol, Russia	Men's Open
Gold medal – first place	2014 Black Hills, United States	Men's Open
Silver medal – second place	2015 Kiilopää, Finland	Men's Open
Gold medal – first place	2025 Quintanar de la Sierra, Spain	Mixed Open
European Rogaining Championships
Silver medal – second place	2009 Ylläs, Finland	Men's Open
Gold medal – first place	2011 Rauna, Latvia	Men's Open
Silver medal – second place	2014 Orava, Estonia	Men's Open
Silver medal – second place	2016 Aralar Range, Spain	Men's Open
European Adventure Racing Championships
Bronze medal – third place	2013 Poland
Silver medal – second place	2014 Turkey

Silver Eensaar (born 29 July 1978 in Tartu) is an Estonian orienteer, rogainer and adventure racer. At the 10th World Rogaining Championships in Přebuz, Czech Republic in 2012 he won a gold medal and the title of the World Rogaining Champion in team with his brother Rain Eensaar in Men's teams category. At 11th World Rogaining Championships in Alol, Pskov oblast Russia in 2013 they successfully defended the title of the World Rogaining Champion. At 12th World Rogaining Championships in Black Hills, South Dakota in 2014 they won the third consecutive title of World Rogaining Champions.

In 2011 he and his brother Rain won a gold medal and the title of the European Rogaining Champion in Rauna, Latvia.

At the European Adventure Race Championships he won a bronze medal in 2013 in Poland and a silver medal in 2014 in Turkey.

He has won two gold medals at Estonian orienteering championships.
