= Order of the Geoduck =

Award for contributions to international rogaining

Order of the Geoduck is an international award issued by the International Rogaining Federation for long-term high level contributions to international rogaining. The award takes the form of a replica geoduck, a saltwater clam found on the Pacific coast of North America.

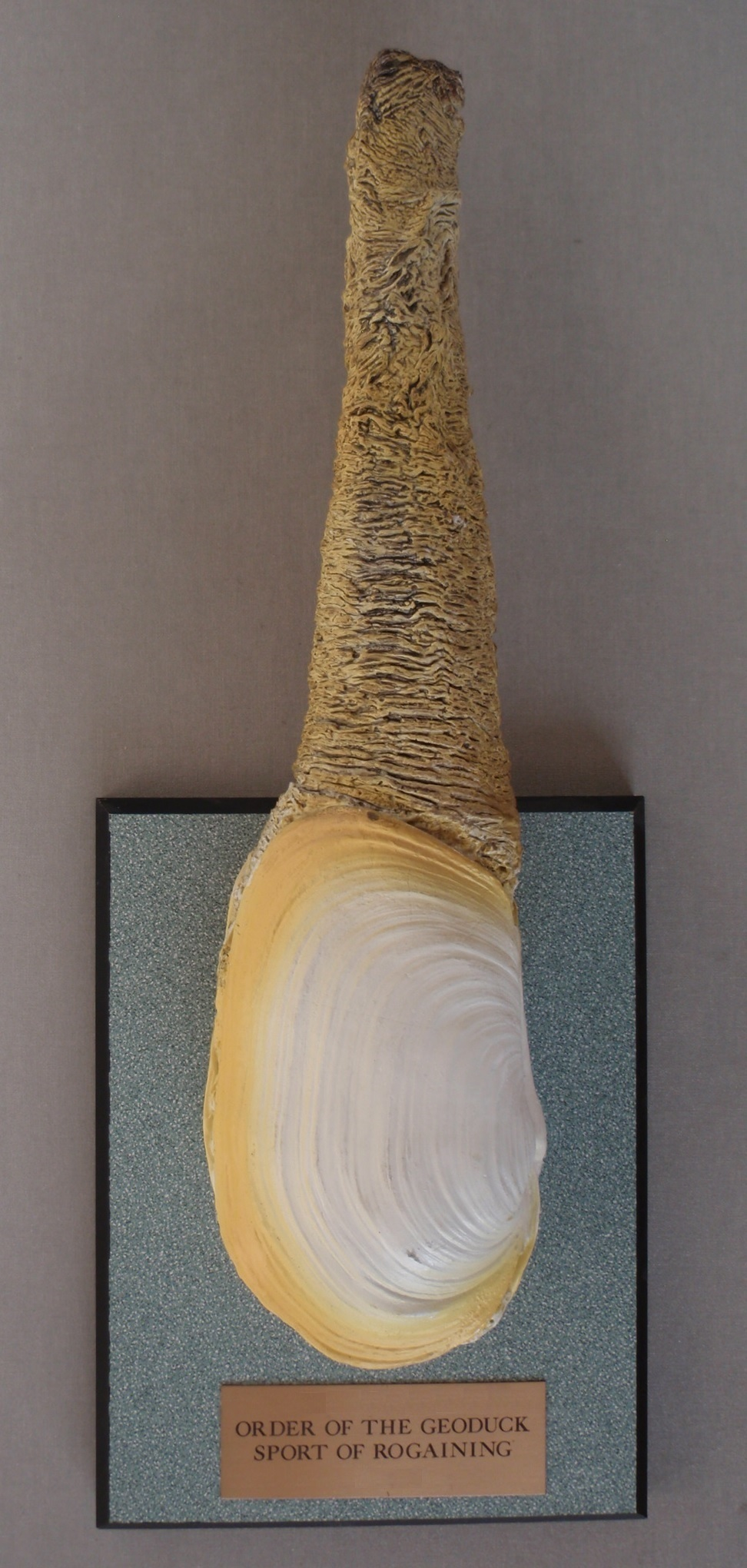
IRF Order of the Geoduck award

Geoduck Awardees have been:

- 1994 Carl Moore (United States)
- 1995 Keg Good (United States)
- 1996 Eric Smith (United States)
- 1997 Wilkey Richardson (United States)
- 1998 Murray Foubister (Canada)
- 1999 Michael Haynes (Canada)
- 2000 Michael Wood (New Zealand)
- 2001 Peg Davis (United States)
- 2002 Neil Phillips (Australia)
- 2003 Rod Phillips (Australia)
- 2004 John Maier (United States)
- 2005 Andres Käär (Estonia)
- 2006 Mal Harding (United States)
- 2006 Alan Mansfield (Australia)
- 2006 Mike Sheridan (New Zealand)
- 2007 Francis Falardeau (Quebec, Canada)
- 2008 Peter Taylor (Australia)
- 2008 Peter Squires (New Zealand)
- 2010 Bill Kennedy (New Zealand)
- 2010 Derek Morris (Australia)
- 2012 Lauri Leppik (Estonia)
- 2012 Bob Reddick (United States)
- 2014 Efim Shtempler (Ukraine)
- 2016 Sergey Yashchenko (Russia)
- 2020 Jan Tojnar (Czech Republic)
- 2020 Richard Robinson (Australia)
