= Anita Liepiņa =

Latvian athlete

Anita Liepiņa (née Stūrīte; born 17 November 1967) is a former Latvian race walker and long-distance runner. Since 2002 she has also practised rogaining.

Her career highlights as a race walker include participation at the 1996, 2000 and 2004 Summer Olympics.

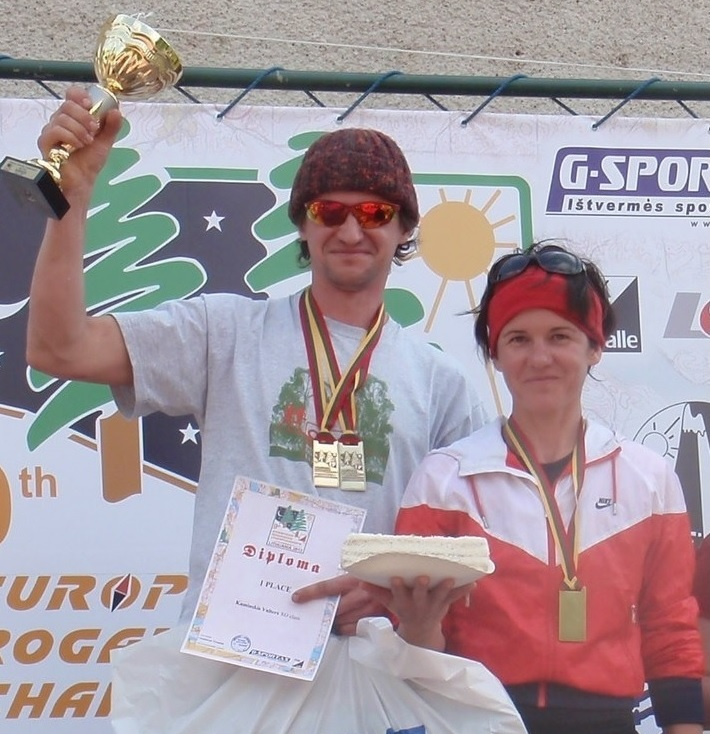
Valters Kaminskis and Anita Liepina, European Rogaining Champions 2012 in Mixed Open category

At the 5th World Rogaining Championships in Lesná, Czech Republic in 2002 she won a gold medal and the title of the World Rogaining Champion in Mixed Open category in team with Guntars Mankus and Raimonds Lapinš. At 6th World Rogaining Championships in Arizona, United States in 2004 the same team won a bronze medal in Mixed Open category. At 7th World Rogaining Championships in Warrumbungles, Australia in 2006 they regained the title of the World Rogaining Champion in Mixed Open category. At 9th World Rogaining Championships in Cheviot, New Zealand in 2010 she won a bronze medal in Mixed Open category in team with Valters Kaminskis.

She is married to Modris Liepiņš.

== Achievements ==
Year	Competition	Venue	Position	Event	Notes
Representing Latvia
1993	Paavo Nurmi Marathon	Turku, Finland	1st	Marathon	2:53:39
1995	World Championships	Gothenburg, Sweden	27th	10 km race walk	45:12
1997	World Championships	Athens, Greece	8th	10 km race walk	45:00.56
2000	Olympic Games	Sydney, Australia	37th	20 km race walk	1:39:17
2002	Riga Marathon	Riga, Latvia	1st	Marathon	3:12:16
2004	Olympic Games	Athens, Greece	45th	20 km race walk	1:39:54
2006	Riga Marathon	Riga, Latvia	1st	Half Marathon	1:33:43
2007	Valmiera Marathon	Valmiera, Latvia	1st	Marathon	3:10:19
