= Podkovák Nature Reserve =

Protected area in Czech Republic

Podkovák Huť
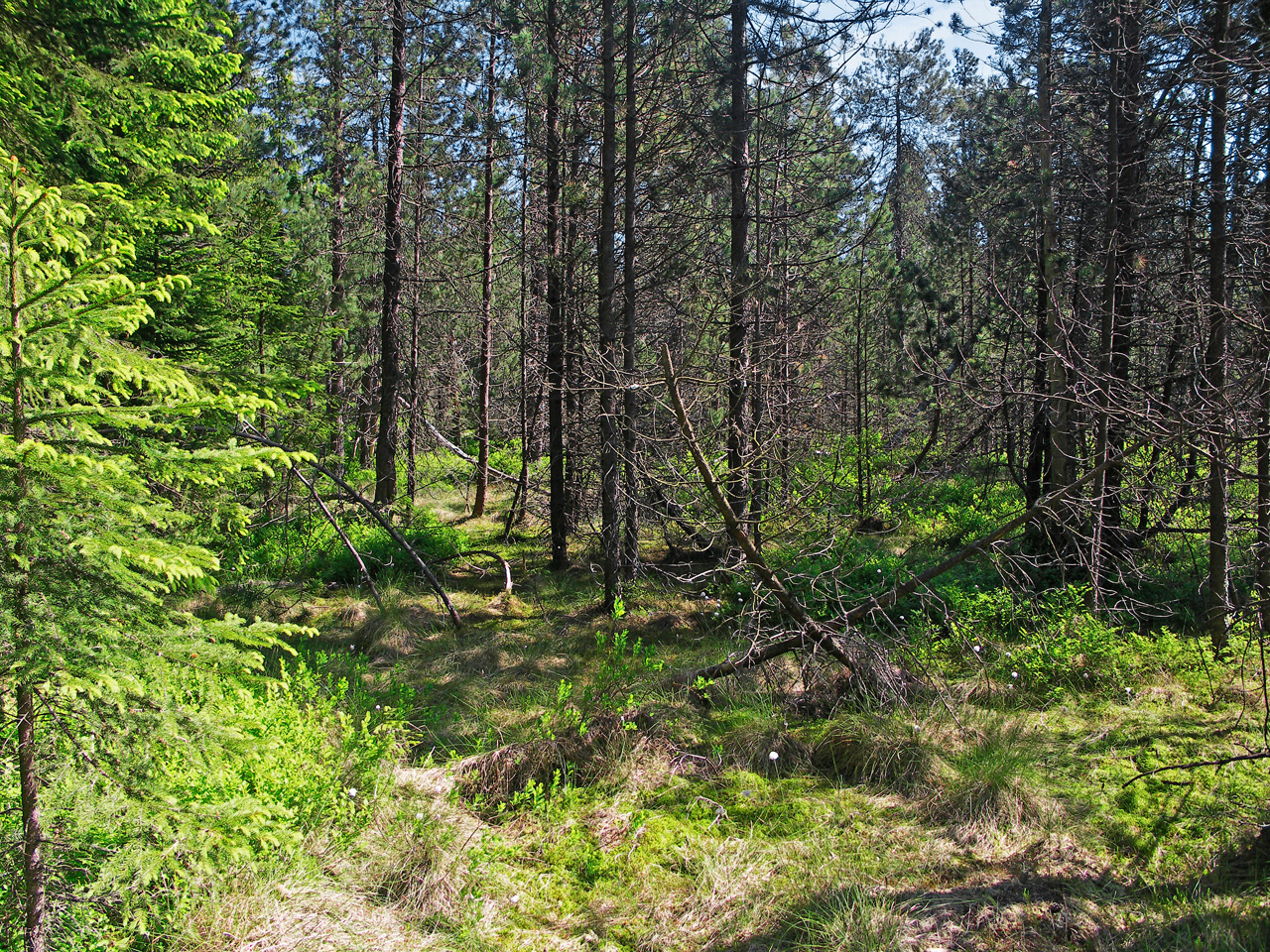
- The edge of the reserve

- Location within Czech Republic
- Location: Lesná, Plzeň Region, Czech Republic
- Coordinates: 49°44′10″N 12°31′38″E
- Area: 5.63 ha (13.9 acres)
- Elevation: 700 m (2,300 ft)
- Operator: PLA Český les Administration

Podkovák is a nature reserve within the Český les Protected Landscape Area in the western part of the Plzeň Region of the Czech Republic. It protects a small raised bog forest in a small depression with Pinus mugo subsp. rotundata. Capercaillie appear in the reserve. The area is 5.63 ha (13.9 acres).

== Sources ==
- Rohlík, Jiří (2004). Český les - sever. Soubor turistických map 1:50 000 (3rd ed.). Mělník: Klub českých turistů. ISBN 80-7324-042-4.
- "Český les PLA". Agency for Nature Conservation and Landscape Protection of the Czech Republic.
