= Rogaine =

Rogaine may refer to:

- Rogaine (drug), a brand of minoxidil, a hair-regrowth medication
- Rogaining, a team sport of cross-country navigation
