= Bouldergaine =

Combination of bouldering and orienteering

Bouldergaine is a sport that combines bouldering and rogaining.

The sport takes place in a large boulder field, which is mapped in a similar way to a traditional rogaine. Teams of 2 people choose which checkpoints to visit within a time limit with the intent of maximizing their score. At each checkpoint is at least one extra bonus point station, which requires scrambling or climbing to access. A successful team will require a mixture of fitness, climbing ability and map skills.

The world's first bouldergaine was held on March 15, 2014, at Kura Tawhiti / Castle Hill in Canterbury, New Zealand. The event was organised by the New Zealand Alpine Club, with over 100 participants.
