= Pavlova Huť Nature Reserve =

Protected area in the Czech Republic

Pavlova Huť
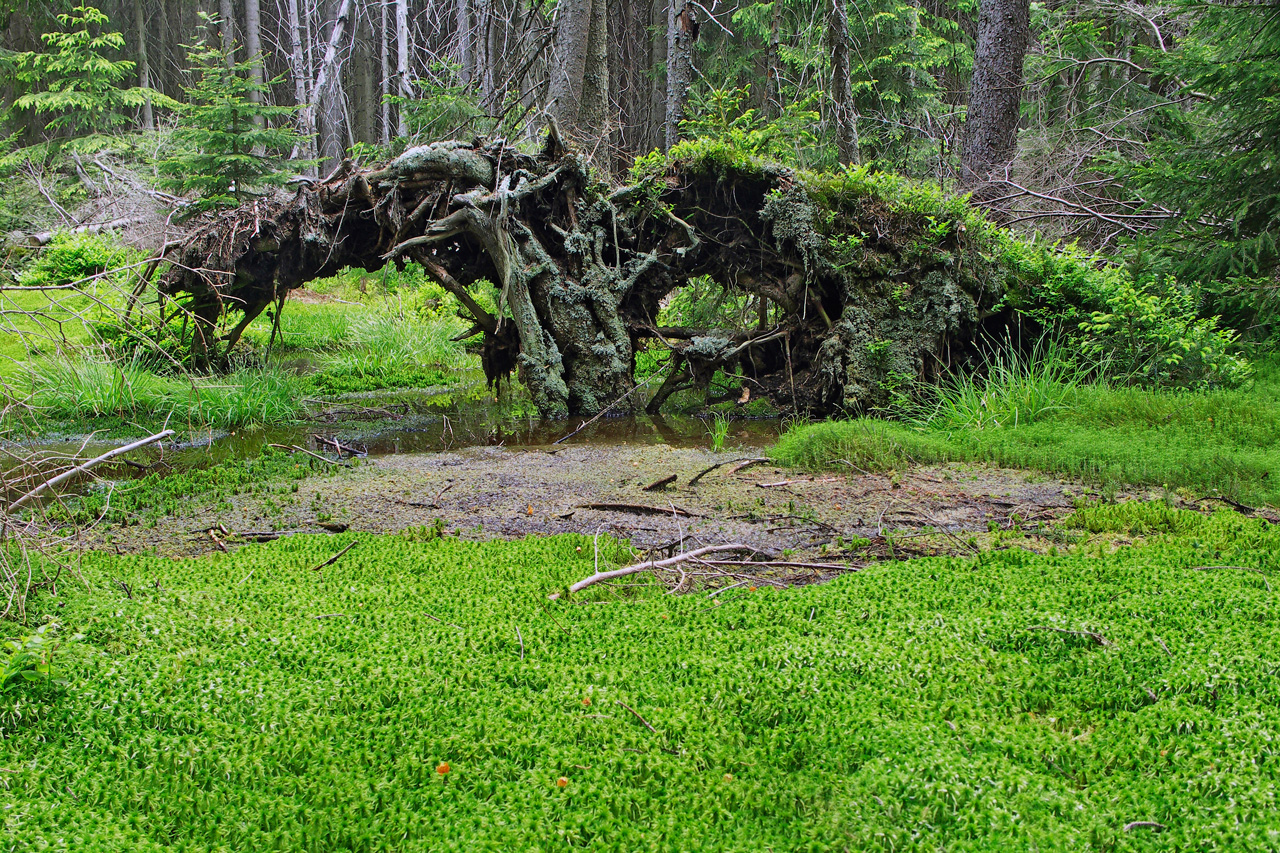
- Sphagnum moss in Pavlova Huť

- Location within Czech Republic
- Location: Lesná, Czech Republic
- Coordinates: 49°47′1″N 12°27′48″E
- Area: 32.74 ha (80.9 acres)
- Elevation: 750 m (2,460 ft)
- Established: 1990
- Operator: Administration of Český les PLA

Pavlova Huť is a nature reserve within the Český les Protected Landscape Area in the western part of the Plzeň Region of the Czech Republic. It is named after a former glass works village (founded around 1740, destroyed after 1945) of the same name which was located nearby. It lies along the boundary with Germany.

The reserve protects a well-preserved bog spruce forest with typical fauna and flora. 100% of the area is forested, mainly by spruce. It is one of few places in the Český les PLA where a spruce forest is native.

Pavlova Huť is also a Special Area of Conservation.
