= Český les Protected Landscape Area =

Protected area in the Czech Republic

Český les
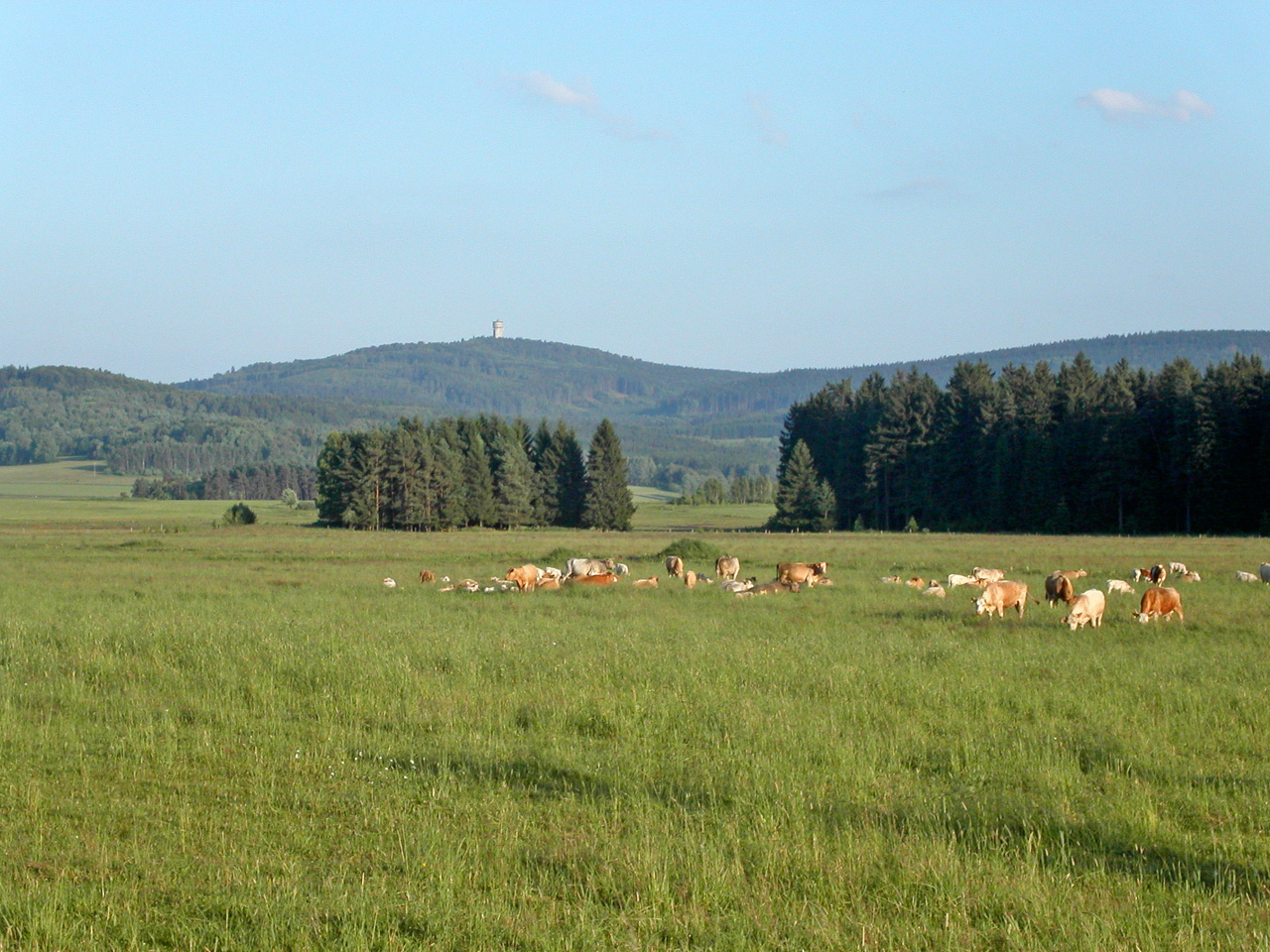
- Typical landscape in Český les

- Location of Český les in the Czech Republic
- Location: Plzeň Region, Czech Republic
- Length: 65 km (40 mi)
- Width: 10 km (6.2 mi)
- Area: 473 km^{2} (183 sq mi)
- Established: 2005
- Operator: Český les PLA Administration

Český les Protected Landscape Area (abbreviated as Český les PLA; Czech: Chráněná krajinná oblast Český les, abbreviated as CHKO Český les) is a protected landscape area in the Czech Republic. It lies in the western part of the Plzeň Region along the border with the German state of Bavaria. It protects the most valuable parts of the Upper Palatinate Forest (Czech: Český les) mountain range.

Český les PLA was declared in 2005 as the 25th protected landscape area of the Czech Republic. Most of the area was vacated after the forced expulsion of the predominantly German inhabitants after the World War II. Until the fall of the Communist regime in 1989 it was part of the Western border zone, virtually uninhabited. Due to this development it is today an area little affected by human activities, a mosaic of deep forests, meadows and forests. There are many valuable well-preserved habitats of the beech and mixed fir-beech forests (though replaced by spruce plantations in a large part of the original area), bog spruce forests and bog Mountain Pine forests. Geologically the area is not much varied, with the nutrient deficient rocks of the so-called Moldanubicum pluton of Paleozoic to Proterozoic origin (granites, gneiss, schists, slates). Český les PLA covers an area of 473 km^{2} (183 sq mi).

There are no permanent settlements in the area, rather a few restored hamlets and many of the meadows and pastures are now used for cattle raising. The protected area is divided in two parts separated by the D5 highway connecting the Czech Republic and Germany. The zone close to the highway was not included in the protected area.

== Small-scale protected areas ==
As of February 2007 there were following nature reserves and other small-scale protected areas within the Český les PLA:

Name	Type	Area		Reason for protection
Broumovská bučina	Nature reserve	26.17 ha	64.7 acres	herb-rich beech forest
Bučina u Žďáru	Nature reserve	6.77 ha	16.7 acres	acidophilous montane beech forest
Bystřice	Nature reserve	43.61 ha	107.8 acres	mixed montane forest
Čerchovské hvozdy	National nature reserve	326.93 ha	807.9 acres	primal mixed beech forest
Diana	Nature reserve	20.41 ha	50.4 acres	primeval herb-rich forest
Dlouhý vrch	Nature reserve	21.00 ha	52 acres	montane sycamore-beech forest
Farské bažiny	Nature reserve	66.00 ha	163 acres	bog spruce forest
Hvožďanská louka	Nature monument	6.70 ha	16.6 acres	managed meadow
Jezírka u Rozvadova	Nature reserve	6.23 ha	15.4 acres	peat bog
Křížový kámen	Nature reserve	19.23 ha	47.5 acres	raised bog forest with peat lakes
Louka u Staré Huti	Nature monument	2.07 ha	5.1 acres	managed bog meadow
Malý Zvon	Nature reserve	8.00 ha	20 acres	autochthonous beech forest
Milov	Nature monument	0.74 ha	1.8 acres	sloped spring peat bog
Na požárech	National nature monument	78.60 ha	194.2 acres	transitional bog (originally declared for grouse protection)
Nad Hutí	Nature reserve	14.04 ha	34.7 acres	autochthonous beech forest
Ostrůvek	Nature reserve	5.51 ha	13.6 acres	raised bog forest
Pavlova Huť	Nature reserve	35.82 ha	88.5 acres	bog spruce forest
Pleš	Nature reserve	27.69 ha	68.4 acres	ravine sycamore and sloped beech forest
Podkovák	Nature reserve	5.63 ha	13.9 acres	raised bog forest
Skalky na Sádku	Nature monument	3.89 ha	9.6 acres	spruce-beach forest
Starý Hirštejn	Nature reserve	37.15 ha	91.8 acres	autochthonous mixed forest
Tišina	Nature reserve	10.35 ha	25.6 acres	acidophilous montane beech forest
Tři Znaky	Nature reserve	289.86 ha	716.3 acres	declaration pending
Veský mlýn	Nature monument	32.04 ha	79.2 acres	transitional bog

== Resources ==
- "Český les PLA". Agency for Nature Conservation and Landscape Protection of the Czech Republic.
- Chytrý, Milan (2001). Katalog biotopů české republiky (in Czech). Prague: Agency for Nature Conservation and Landscape Protection of the Czech Republic. ISBN 80-86064-55-7.
