= International Rogaining Federation =

International governing body for rogaining

- Abbreviation: IRF
- Formation: June 16, 1989; 37 years ago
- Type: Federation of national sports associations
- Headquarters: Australia
- Region served: Worldwide
- Members: 23 countries are represented
- President: vacant
- Vice President: Julie Quinn (AUS)
- Secretary: Rod Phillips (AUS)
- Technical Manager: Sergey Yashchenko (RUS)
- Main organ: IRF Council
- Website: rogaining.org

International Rogaining Federation (IRF) is the peak international body for the sport of rogaining. The aims of the IRF are to promote rogaining worldwide, maintain the culture and the rules of the sport.

The IRF has adopted the Rules of Rogaining, which set the basic rules of the sport, govern the conduct of competitors and set minimum technical standards for championship rogaines.

The IRF sanctions World Rogaining Championships, which are held bi-annually as from 2017 (previously have been held annually 2012-2017, previously once in two years). The IRF issues Geoduck awards to rogaining administrators and event organisers for long-term contributions to international rogaining.

== Membership ==
According to the IRF Constitution, membership is restricted to national associations, which are representative of rogainers and take responsibility for the development of rogaining in a country.

International Rogaining Federation membership: Members Observers

As of January 2026 there were ten member associations of the IRF:

- New Zealand Rogaining Association (NZRA)
- (Czech Republic) Czech Association of Rogaining and Mountain Orienteering (CAR)
- (Australia) Australian Rogaining Association (ARA)
- (Estonia) Estonian Orienteering Federation (EOF)
- (United States) Orienteering USA (OUSA)
- (Ukraine) Ukrainian Orienteering Federation (UOF)
- (Latvia) Latvian Orienteering Federation (LOF)
- (Russia) Russian Rogaining Federation (RRF)
- IbeRogaine (Spain)
- Rogaining Finland (RF)

Several countries hold an observer status with the IRF, being represented by individuals on behalf of rogaining communities of these countries.

== Governance structure ==
The IRF is governed by a Council consisting of Councillors representing member associations (two representatives nominated by each member association) and members of the Executive.

Day-to-day management of the IRF is vested in the Executive, which has seven positions: the President, the Vice-President, the Secretary, the Treasurer, the Promotion and Development Manager, the World Championships Manager and the Technical Manager.

As from 4 July 2025, the interim IRF President is Julie Quinn (Australia).

The IRF is registered and based in Melbourne, Australia.
