= Quintanar de la Sierra =

- Municipality and town
- Coat of arms
- Interactive map of Quintanar de la Sierra
- Coordinates: 41°59′N 3°02′W
- Country: Spain
- Autonomous community: Castile and León
- Province: Burgos
- Comarca: Sierra de la Demanda

Area
  - Total: 59.904 km^{2} (23.129 sq mi)
- Elevation: 1,113 m (3,652 ft)

Population (2025-01-01)
  - Total: 1,474
  - Density: 24.61/km^{2} (63.73/sq mi)
- Time zone: UTC+1 (CET)
  - Summer (DST): UTC+2 (CEST)
- Postal code: 09670
- Website: http://www.quintanardelasierra.es/

Quintanar de la Sierra is a municipality and town located in the province of Burgos, Castile and León, Spain. According to the 2004 census (INE), the municipality has a population of 1,896 inhabitants.

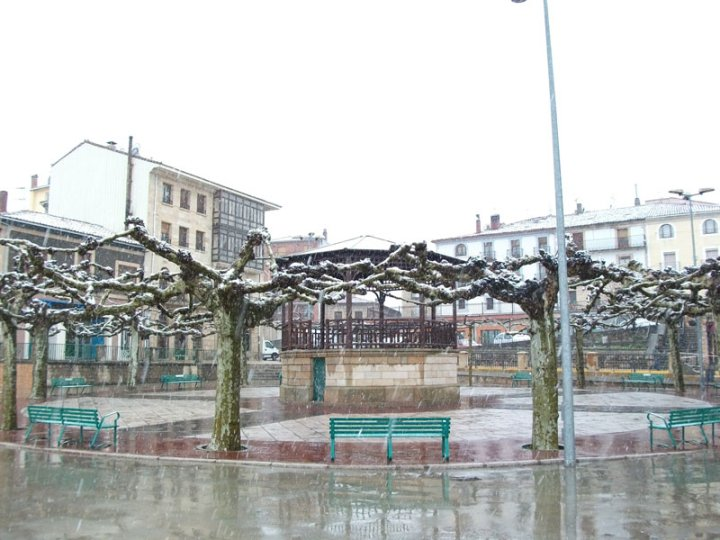
Snowy view of the main square of Quintanar de la Sierra
