= Alīda Ābola =

Latvian orienteering competitor (born 1954)

Medal record

Women's orienteering

Representing Soviet Union

World Championships
Bronze medal – third place	1989 Skövde	Individual

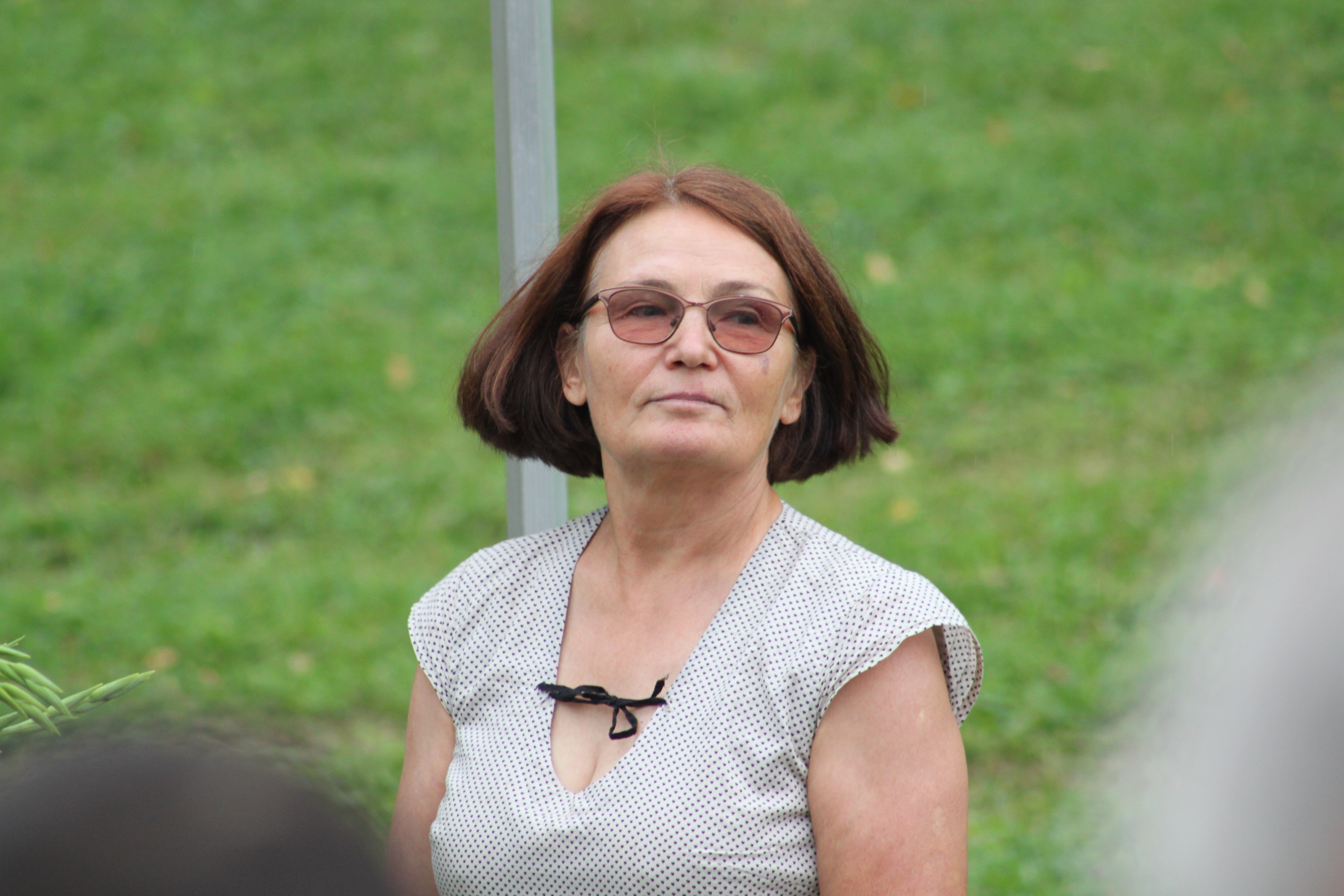
Alīda Ābola

Alīda Ābola (born 29 November 1954) is a former Latvian orienteering competitor. She received a bronze medal in the individual event at the 1989 World Orienteering Championships in Skövde, and finished 5th with the Soviet relay team.

Now she lives in Sigulda, Latvia.
