= Orava, Estonia =

Village in Estonia

Orava
- Location within Estonia
- Coordinates: 57°53′15″N 27°27′30″E
- Country: Estonia
- County: Võru County
- Time zone: UTC+2 (EET)

Orava (German: Waldeck) is a village in Võru Parish, Võru County, South East Estonia.

Orava railway station on Tartu-Pechory railway line is located around 3 km north of the village. It is second station on the Edelaraudtee Koidula - Tartu route.

== Gallery ==
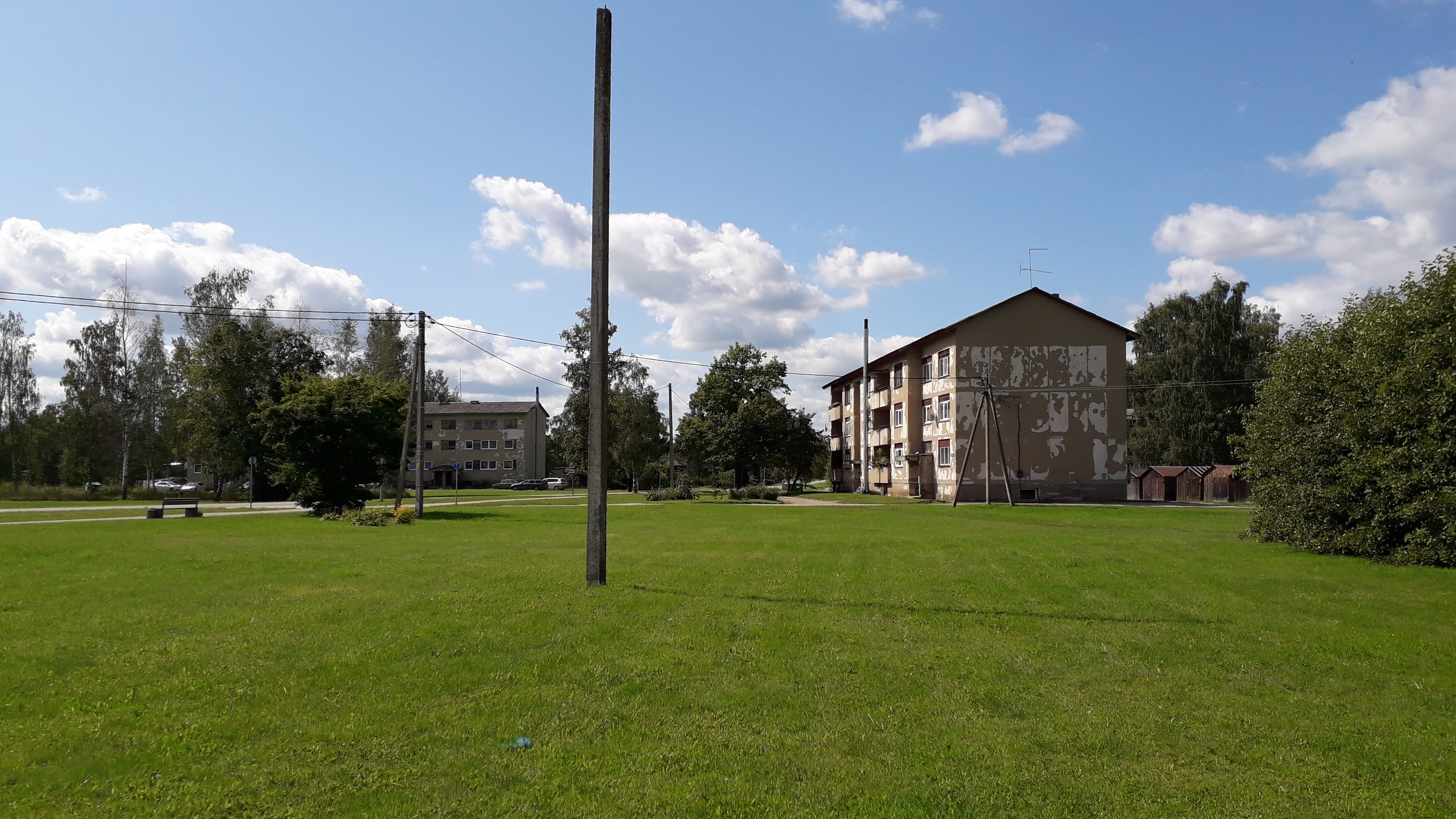
Orava village

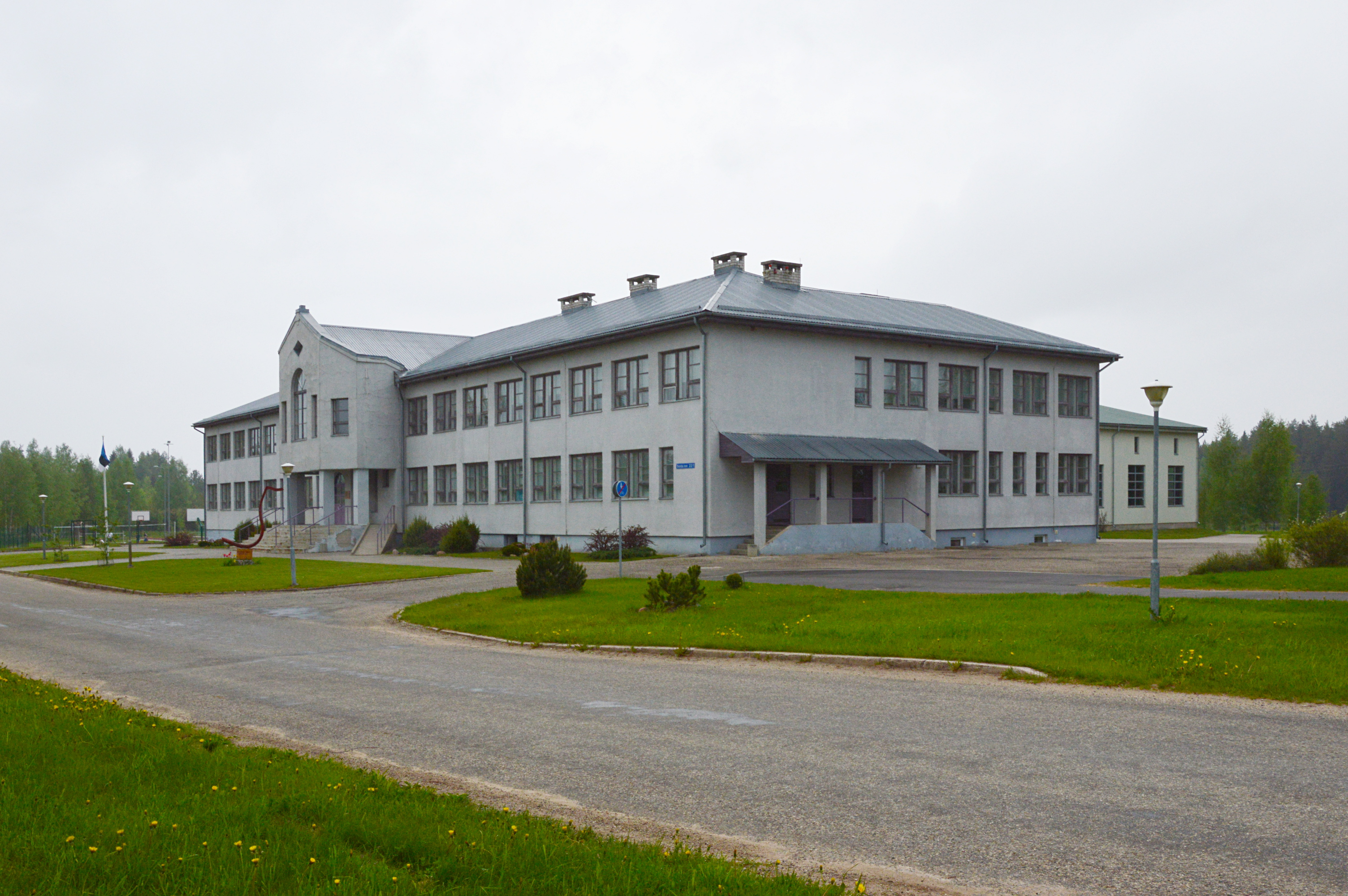
Orava school

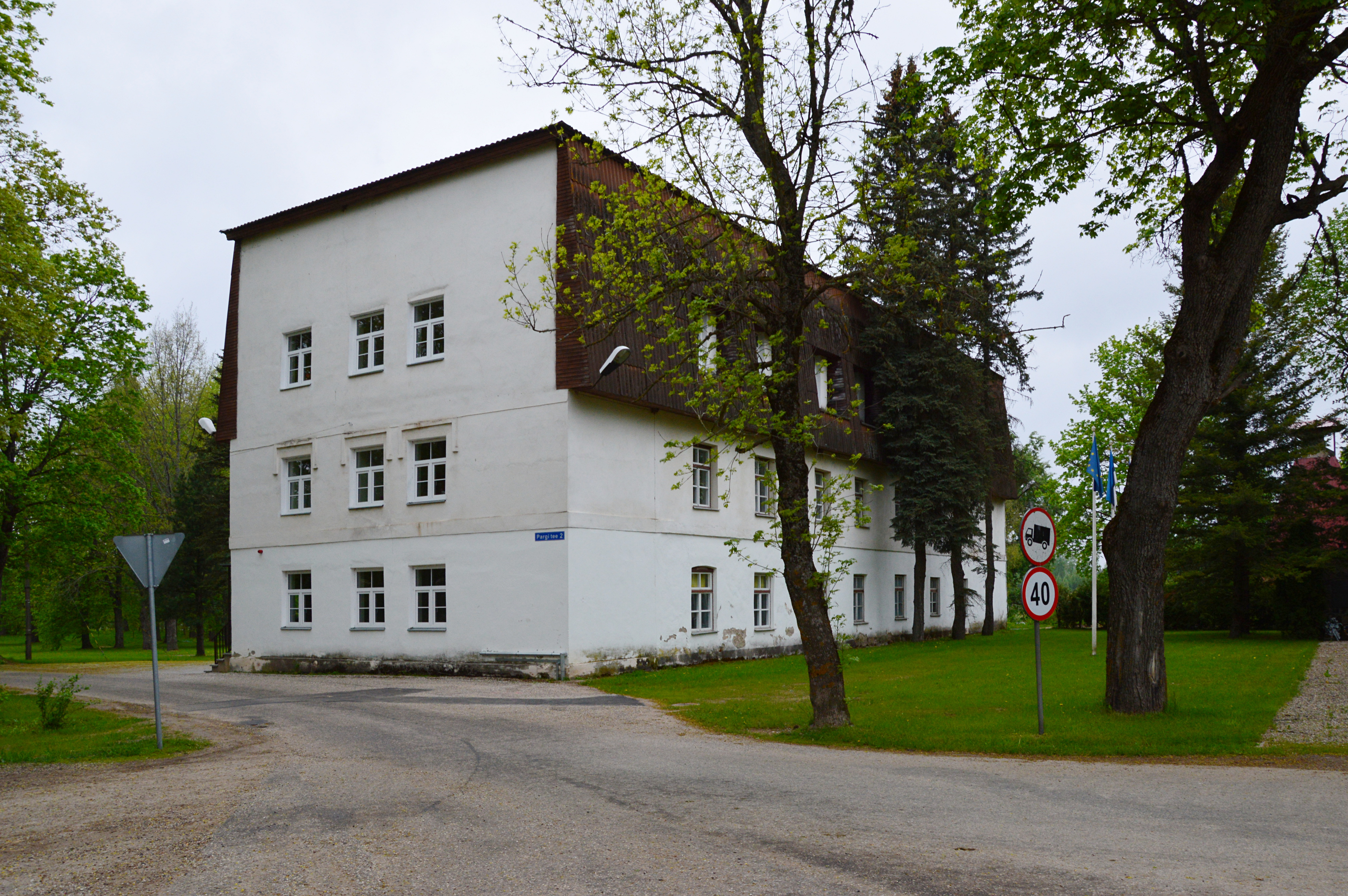

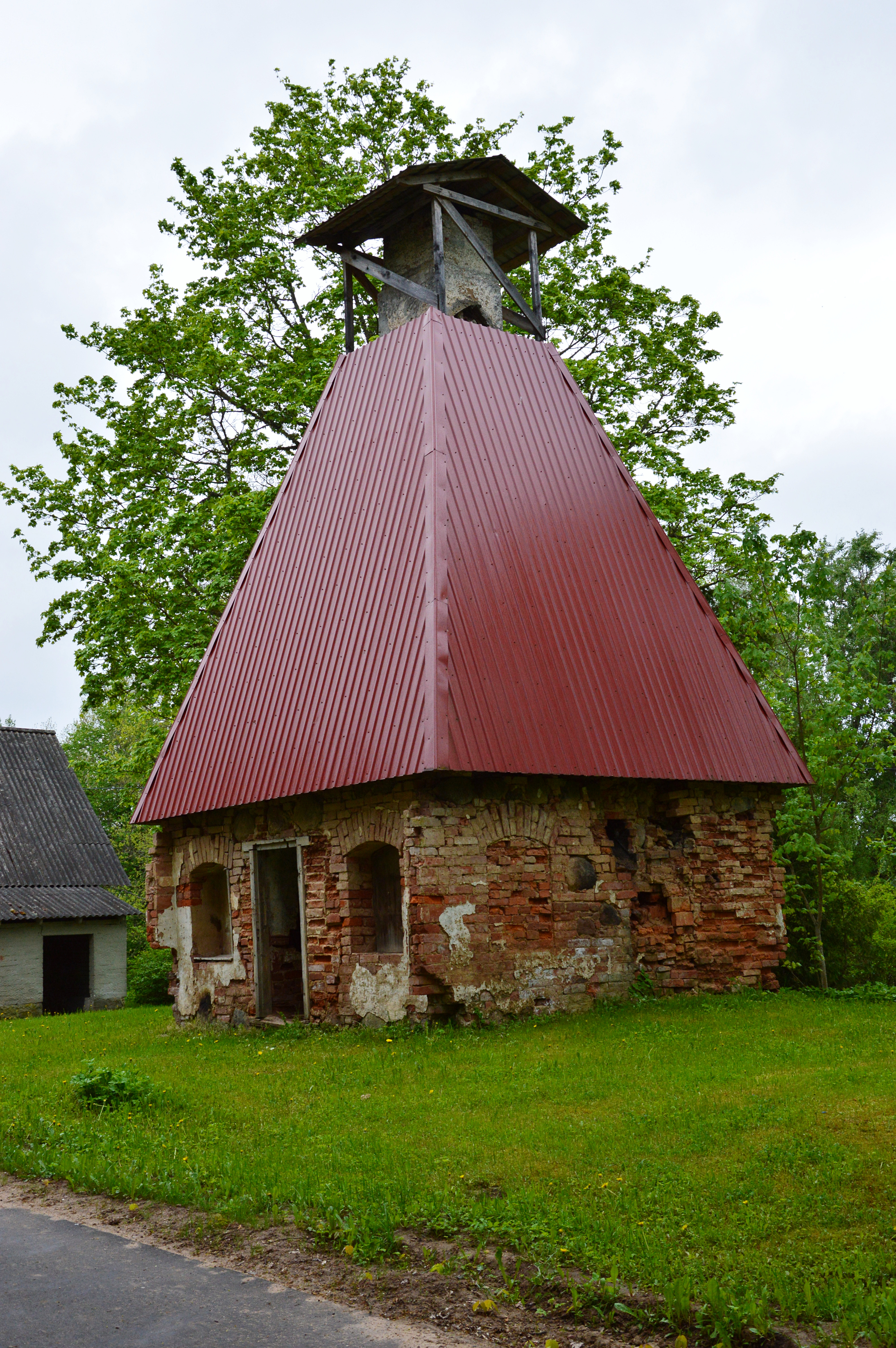

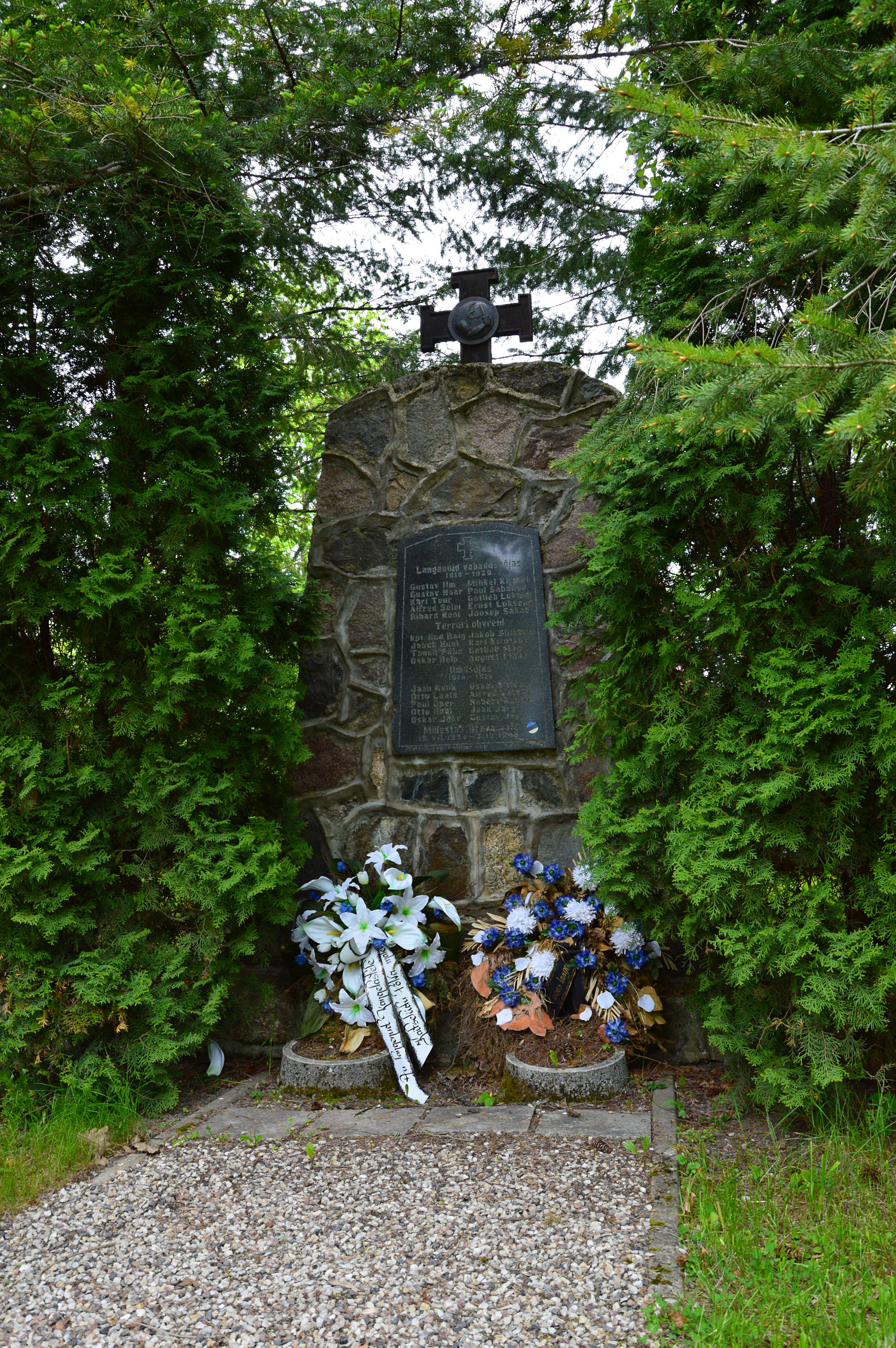

Preceding station	Elron	Following station
Ilumetsa towards Tallinn	Tallinn–Tartu–Koidula	Koidula Terminus
