= Lesná (Tachov District) =

- Municipality
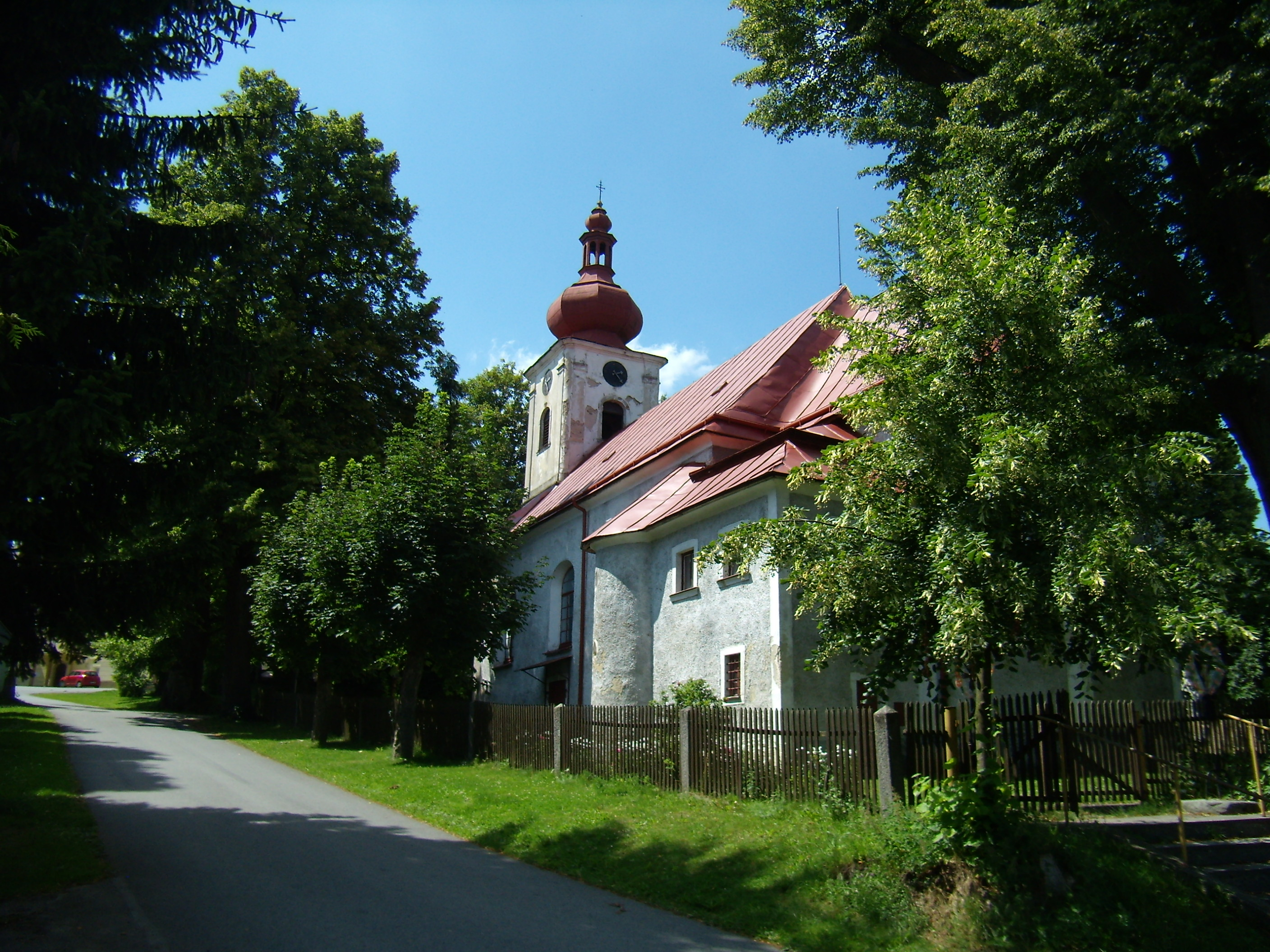
- Church of Saint Nicholas

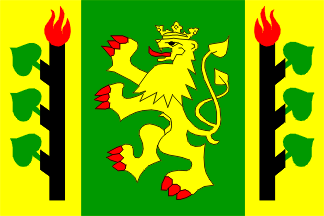
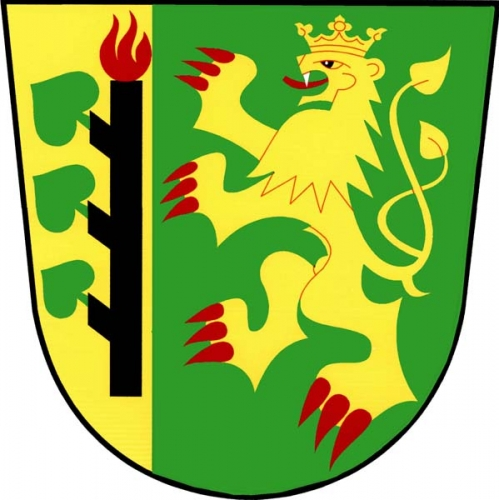
- Flag Coat of arms

- Location in the Czech Republic
- Coordinates: 49°45′15″N 12°32′16″E
- Country: Czech Republic
- Region: Plzeň
- District: Tachov
- First mentioned: 1348

Area
  - Total: 84.29 km^{2} (32.54 sq mi)
- Elevation: 643 m (2,110 ft)

Population (2026-01-01)
  - Total: 474
  - Density: 5.62/km^{2} (14.6/sq mi)
- Time zone: UTC+1 (CET)
  - Summer (DST): UTC+2 (CEST)
- Postal code: 347 01
- Website: www.obeclesna.cz

Lesná (German: Schönwald) is a municipality and village in Tachov District in the Plzeň Region of the Czech Republic. It has about 500 inhabitants.

== Administrative division ==
Lesná consists of four municipal parts (in brackets population according to the 2021 census):

- Lesná (386)
- Háje (9)
- Písařova Vesce (52)
- Stará Knížecí Huť (9)

== Etymology ==
The original German name Schönwald means 'beautiful forest'. The modern Czech name Lesná is derived from the word les, i.e. 'forest'.

== Geography ==
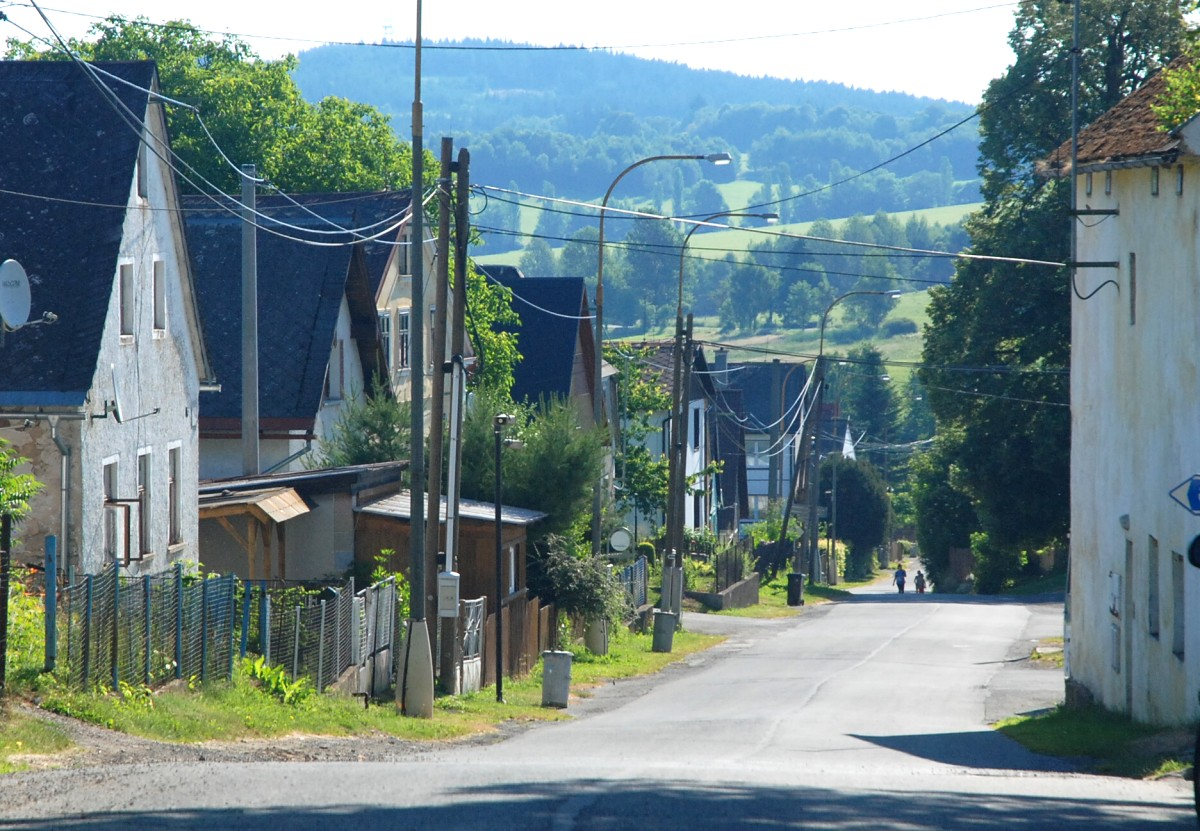
A street in Lesná

Lesná is located about 8 kilometres (5 mi) southwest of Tachov and 59 km (37 mi) west of Plzeň. The municipality lies on the border with Germany and is adjacent to German municipalities of Bärnau, Flossenbürg and Georgenberg.

Lesná lies in the Upper Palatine Forest mountain range. The highest point is the Havran mountain at 894 m (2,933 ft) above sea level. In the eastern part of the municipal territory is the source of the stream Kateřinský potok, the headwater of the Pfreimd River. Most of the territory consists of extensive forests and about three-quarters of the territory is protected as the Český les Protected Landscape Area. There are also several small-scaled protected areas, including the Pavlova Huť Nature Reserve.

== History ==
The first written mention of Lesná is from 1348, when the king sold the village with the church to Arkleb of Tisová. From 1523, it was located on a trade route from the Kingdom of Bohemia to the Bavarian Upper Palatinate region, which brought prosperity to the village. In the 16th century, it was referred to as a market town. In the second half of the 16th century, Lesná was acquired by the Schirndinger family, who (along with their descendants the Dobřenský family) owned the estate until 1945.

Around 1600, Paul Schürer bought an area in the woods in what is today the southwestern part of the municipality. He founded the village of Zahájí (German: Waldheim) and ran a glass factory there. He then received the title of a knight from the hands of Emperor Rudolf II and had built a castle. The castle was abandoned in 1780 and replaced by a new one, which was inhabited until the 20th century.

From 1938 to 1945, the territory was annexed by Nazi Germany and administered as part of the Reichsgau Sudetenland. After World War II, the German population was expelled. Several settlements immediately at the frontier with West Germany, including Zahájí, were abandoned and became a restricted zone after the implementation of the Iron Curtain. The entire village of Zahájí, including the castle, was razed to the ground in the 1950s.

== Demographics ==
Historical population

Year	Pop.	±%
1869	5,531	—
1880	4,352	−21.3%
1890	4,138	−4.9%
1900	3,789	−8.4%
1910	3,653	−3.6%

Year	Pop.	±%
1921	3,507	−4.0%
1930	3,234	−7.8%
1950	799	−75.3%
1961	583	−27.0%
1970	458	−21.4%

Year	Pop.	±%
1980	515	+12.4%
1991	460	−10.7%
2001	492	+7.0%
2011	443	−10.0%
2021	456	+2.9%

Source: Censuses

== Transport ==
There are no railways or major roads passing through the municipality. On the Czech–German border are two pedestrian border crossings: Přední Zahájí / Waldheiml and Křížový Kámen / Kreuzstein.

== Sights ==
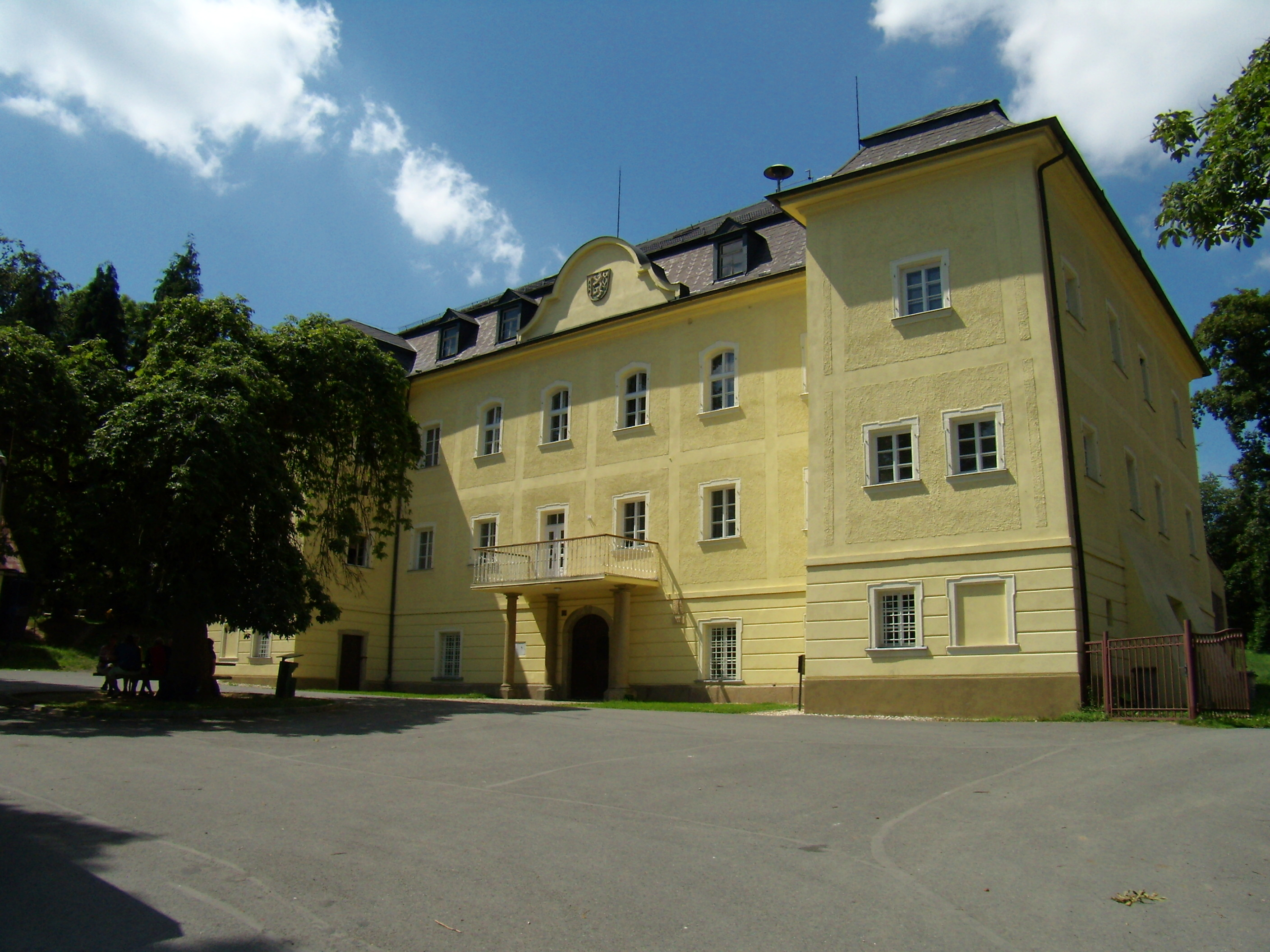
Lesná Castle

The main landmark of Lesná is the Church of Saint Nicholas. It was originally a Gothic church, rebuilt in the Baroque style in 1728 and 1774.

Construction of the Lešná Castle was finished in 1787. Today this Baroque castle is the seat of the municipal office.

Ruin of the Zahájí Castle is located in the forests near the Czech–German border. Only several fragments have been preserved.
