= Přebuz =

- Town
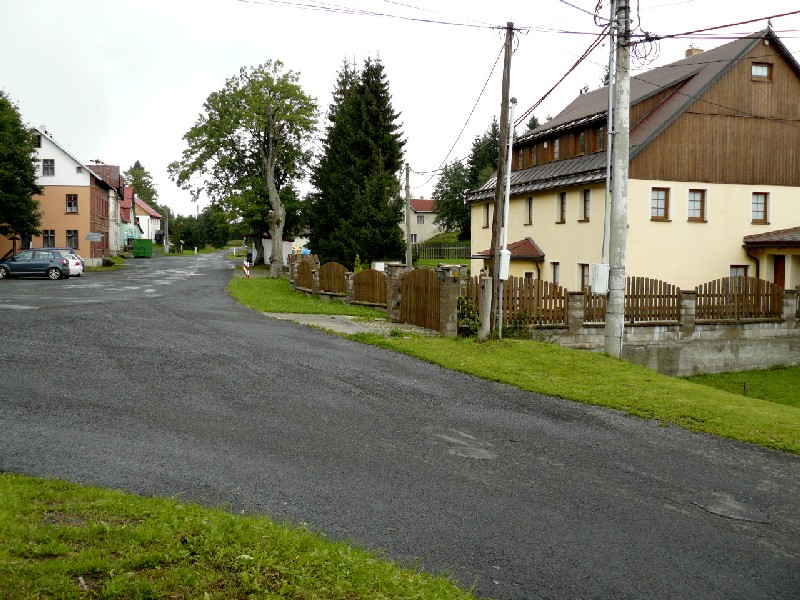
- Centre of Přebuz

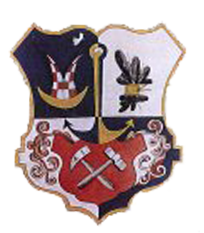
- Coat of arms

- Location in the Czech Republic
- Coordinates: 50°23′12″N 12°37′40″E
- Country: Czech Republic
- Region: Karlovy Vary
- District: Sokolov
- First mentioned: 1542

Government
  - Mayor: Martin Bruoth

Area
  - Total: 29.77 km^{2} (11.49 sq mi)
- Elevation: 886 m (2,907 ft)

Population (2026-01-01)
  - Total: 67
  - Density: 2.3/km^{2} (5.8/sq mi)
- Time zone: UTC+1 (CET)
  - Summer (DST): UTC+2 (CEST)
- Postal code: 357 06
- Website: www.prebuz.cz

Přebuz (Czech pronunciation: [ˈpr̝̊ɛbus]; German: Frühbuß) is a town in Sokolov District in the Karlovy Vary Region of the Czech Republic. It is the smallest town in the Czech Republic by population, which is 67 inhabitants as of 2026. Before World War II, it was a mining town with 3,000 inhabitants. Přebuz is located in the Ore Mountains.

== Etymology ==
The name is probably derived from the personal name Přebud, meaning "Přebud's (court)". The German name was probably derived from the Czech one.

== Geography ==
Přebuz is located about 21 kilometres (13 mi) north of Sokolov and 22 km (14 mi) northwest of Karlovy Vary. It lies on the border with Germany, in the western part of the Ore Mountains. The highest point is the mountain Čertova hora at 987 m (3,238 ft) above sea level. The Rolava River originates in the municipal territory.

== History ==
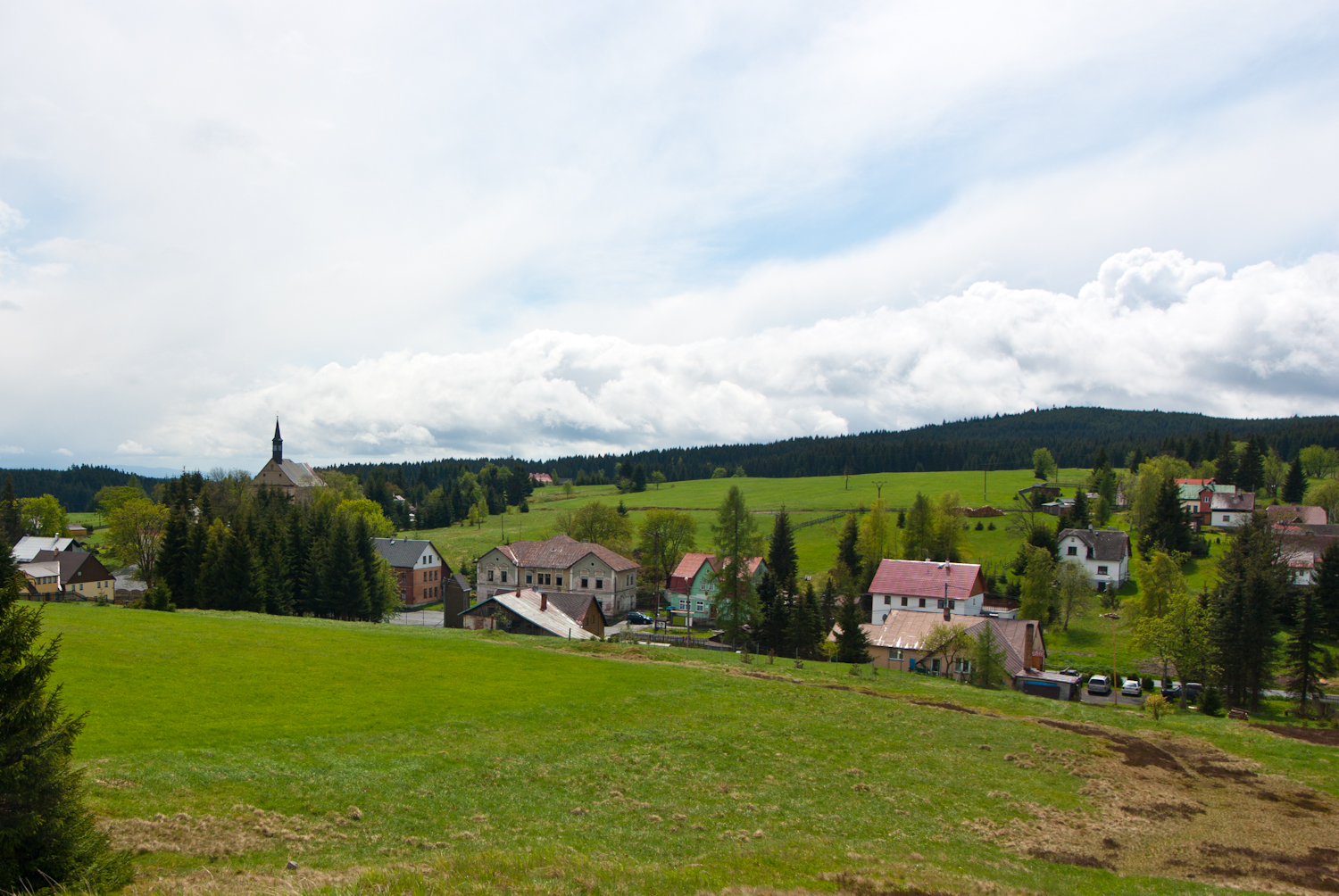
View of Přebuz

The foundation of Přebuz is connected with rich finds of tin ore. According to its chronicle from 1836, Přebuz was founded in 1347 by German colonisers. Although this date is unconfirmed, it is considered probable. The first written mention of Přebuz is from 1542. In 1553, Přebuz gained status and rights of a mining town.

Before World War II, the town had about 3,000 inhabitants. From 1938 to 1945, Přebuz was annexed by Nazi Germany and administered as part of the Reichsgau Sudetenland. After the war, the population has decreased significantly because of expulsion of Germans and termination of mining.

== Demographics ==
Přebuz is the least populous municipality with the town status in the Czech Republic.

Historical population

Year	Pop.	±%
1869	2,894	—
1880	2,850	−1.5%
1890	2,982	+4.6%
1900	3,104	+4.1%
1910	3,264	+5.2%

Year	Pop.	±%
1921	2,837	−13.1%
1930	2,771	−2.3%
1950	163	−94.1%
1961	202	+23.9%
1970	115	−43.1%

Year	Pop.	±%
1980	100	−13.0%
1991	56	−44.0%
2001	73	+30.4%
2011	69	−5.5%
2021	64	−7.2%

Source: Censuses

== Transport ==
There are no railways or major roads passing through the municipal territory.

== Sights ==
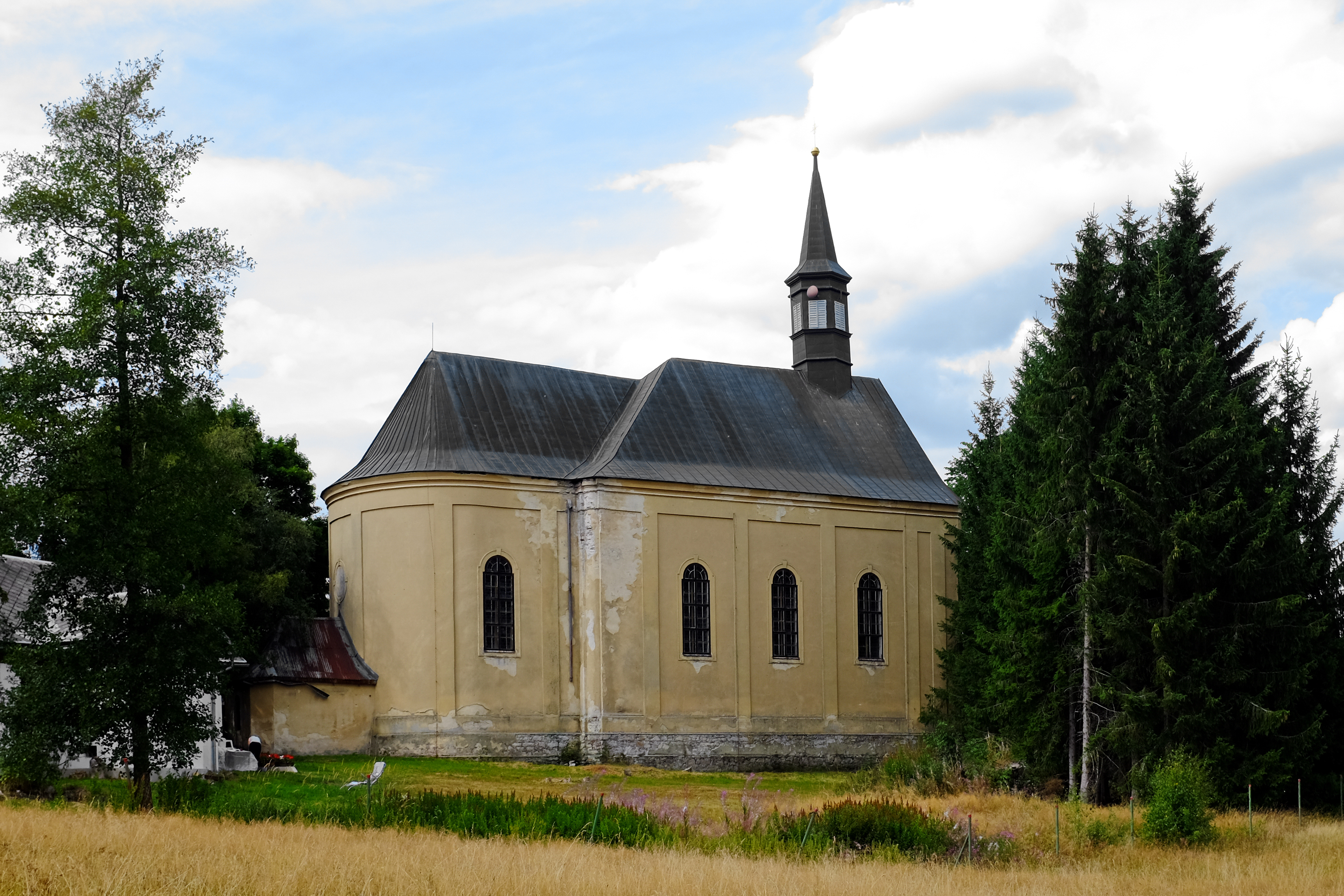
Church of Saint Bartholomew

The main landmark of Přebuz is the Church of Saint Bartholomew. It is originally a Gothic church from the end of the 14th century, rebuilt in the Baroque style around 1775.
