= Rogaining =

Sport incorporating long distance navigation

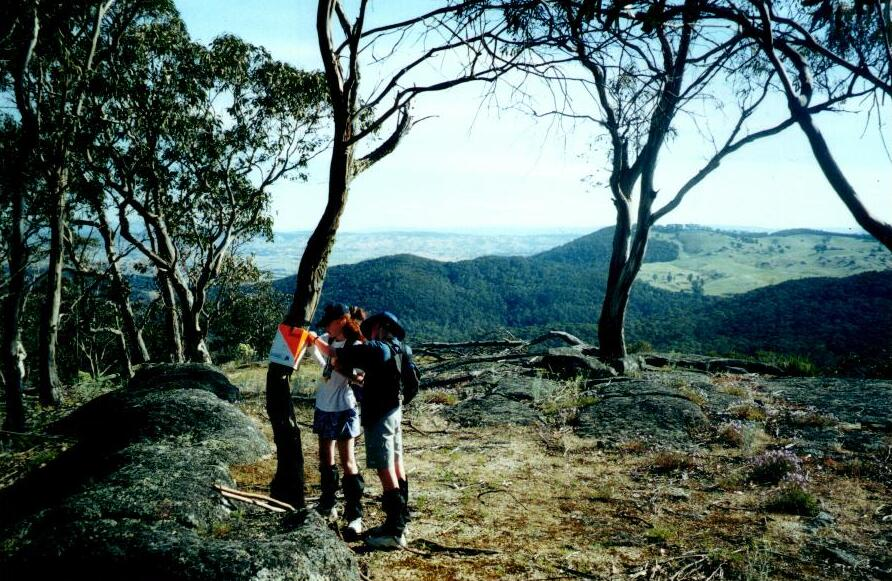
- Competitors at a checkpoint
- First played: Australia

Characteristics
- Team members: 2–5
- Mixed-sex: Mixed
- Type: Outdoor

The standard international orienteering symbol is used to designate a checkpoint on rogaining courses.

Rogaining is an orienteering sport of long distance cross-country navigation, involving route planning and navigation between checkpoints using a variety of map types. In a rogaine, teams of two to five people choose which checkpoints to visit within a time limit with the intent of maximising their score. Teamwork, endurance, competition and an appreciation for the natural environment are features of the sport. Championship rogaines are 24 hours long, but rogaines can be as short as two hours.

== History ==
Rogaining can trace its roots back to 1947 when the first of many events with some of the features of rogaines was organised by the Melbourne University Mountaineering Club. The events from the 1940s eventually led to the birth of the sport of rogaining in April 1976, in Melbourne, Australia. The sport was named, rules were adopted, and the world’s first rogaining association was formed (the Victorian Rogaining Association). Growth of the association and the sport occurred rapidly over the next decade.

The word rogaining is derived from the names of three of the founders, Rod Phillips, Gail Davis (née Phillips) and Neil Phillips (RoGaiNe, hence "rogaining", "rogainer" etc.), who were all members of the Surrey-Thomas Rover Crew which organised the world's first rogaine. The name was formally adopted by the Victorian Rogaining Association at its inaugural annual general meeting in August 1976 and accepted by Scouts Australia and University bushwalking groups to give the new sport an identity in its own right.

World Rogaining Championships were first held in 1992, and then every two years from 1996 to 2012. Between 2012 and 2017, they were held every year, but changed back to every two years in 2017. The country arranging the World Championships is chosen two years in advance by the International Rogaining Federation.

- 1st World Rogaining Championship (1992): Beechworth, Australia, about 200 teams
- 2nd World Rogaining Championship (1996): Mt Singleton, Western Australia, 640 participants in 271 teams
- 3rd World Rogaining Championship (1998): Kamloops, British Columbia, Canada
- 4th World Rogaining Championship (2000): Christchurch, New Zealand
- 5th World Rogaining Championship (2002): Lesna, Czech Republic, 202 teams
- 6th World Rogaining Championship (2004): Arizona, USA, 380 participants from 15 countries and 33 U.S. states.
- 7th World Rogaining Championship (2006): New South Wales, Australia; 691 participants (311 teams), 125 from overseas
- 8th World Rogaining Championship (2008): Karula National Park, Estonia; 748 participants (339 teams) from 22 countries.
- 9th World Rogaining Championship (2010): Cheviot, New Zealand; 522 participants (251 teams)
- 10th World Rogaining Championship (2012): Přebuz, Czech Republic
- 11th World Rogaining Championship (2013): Alol, Russian Federation
- 12th World Rogaining Championship (2014): Black Hills, South Dakota, USA
- 13th World Rogaining Championship (2015): Kiilopää, Lapland, Finland
- 14th World Rogaining Championship (2016): Alice Springs, Australia
- 15th World Rogaining Championship (2017): Rāzna National Park, Latvia
- 16th World Rogaining Championship (2019): La Molina, Catalonia, Spain
- 17th World Rogaining Championship (2022): Králický Sněžník, Czechia
- 18th World Rogaining Championship (2023): Lake Tahoe, California, USA
- 19th World Rogaining Championship (2025): Burgos, Spain
- 20th World Rogaining Championship (2027): Wilpena Pound, Australia

== Basic play ==
Teams of two to five members visit as many checkpoints as possible in the time allowed. Shorter duration rogaines often allow solo competitors. Checkpoints are scored differently depending on the level of difficulty in reaching them; therefore, teams choose a strategy (for example, visiting many low-scoring checkpoints). Teams travel entirely on foot, navigating by map and compass between checkpoints in terrain that varies from open farmland to hilly forest. A central base camp known as a "hash house" provides hot meals throughout the event, and teams may return at any time to eat, rest or sleep. Teams travel at their own pace, and participants can practise cross-country navigation at their own level of competition and comfort. Team members stay within earshot of each other.

The duration of a championship rogaine is 24 hours, but shorter variations such as 3-, 6-, 8-, 12- and 15-hour events are also held (sometimes concurrently with a 24-hour event). Depending on the terrain, experienced rogaining teams can cover more than one hundred kilometres (62 mi) over the 24-hour period. There have also been longer events (dubbed "Endurogaines") lasting 48 and 50 hours. In their native Australia, rogaines are usually held every month during weekends near full moons, with annual state championships and an annual national championship. They require dozens of volunteers to run, including course setters and caterers and are often attended by hundreds of participants. A competitive 24-hour rogaine requires a map area of around 250 km^{2} (97 sq mi), for relatively flat terrain; terrain with significant climbs may require far less or far more area, depending on the placement of checkpoints.

== Variants ==
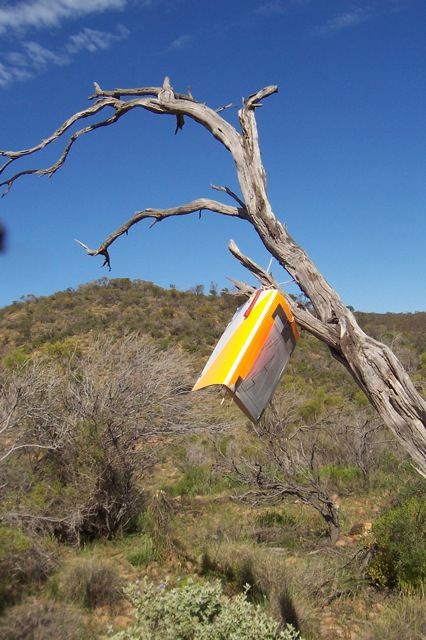
Rogaine control placed on a small knoll. While some controls can be relatively easy to spot, many require careful navigation to locate.

Other forms of rogaining are popular, particularly in Australia during the months when normal rogaines are not held because of the weather. Popular variations include:

- Bouldergaine: A combination of rogaining and bouldering.
- Metrogaine: An event of usually around six hours and held in predominantly urban areas.
- Cyclegaine/Cyclogaine/Velogaine: Usually run for six hours in areas with trails suitable for mountainbiking.
- Snogaine: Held in areas that are snowbound and participants may either snowshoe or ski to reach checkpoints.
- Paddlogaine: A rogaine on a water covered area, such as a set of interconnected lakes. Participants can generally use any human-powered watercraft.
- Motorienteering: A rogaine with motorcycles. Event lasts 6h. Control points are located both in urban and rural areas
- Nightgaine: A rogaine held at night, where participants use head torches to aid in navigation.

The most southern Rogaine was held at the Mitchell Peninsula, Antarctica in February 2026 as part of the Australian Antarctic Division program. This was won by Charlotte Richards and Martin Kucera in a 3-hour event.

== See also ==
- Adventure race
- Fastpacking
- Fell running
- Orienteering
