= Demandafolk =

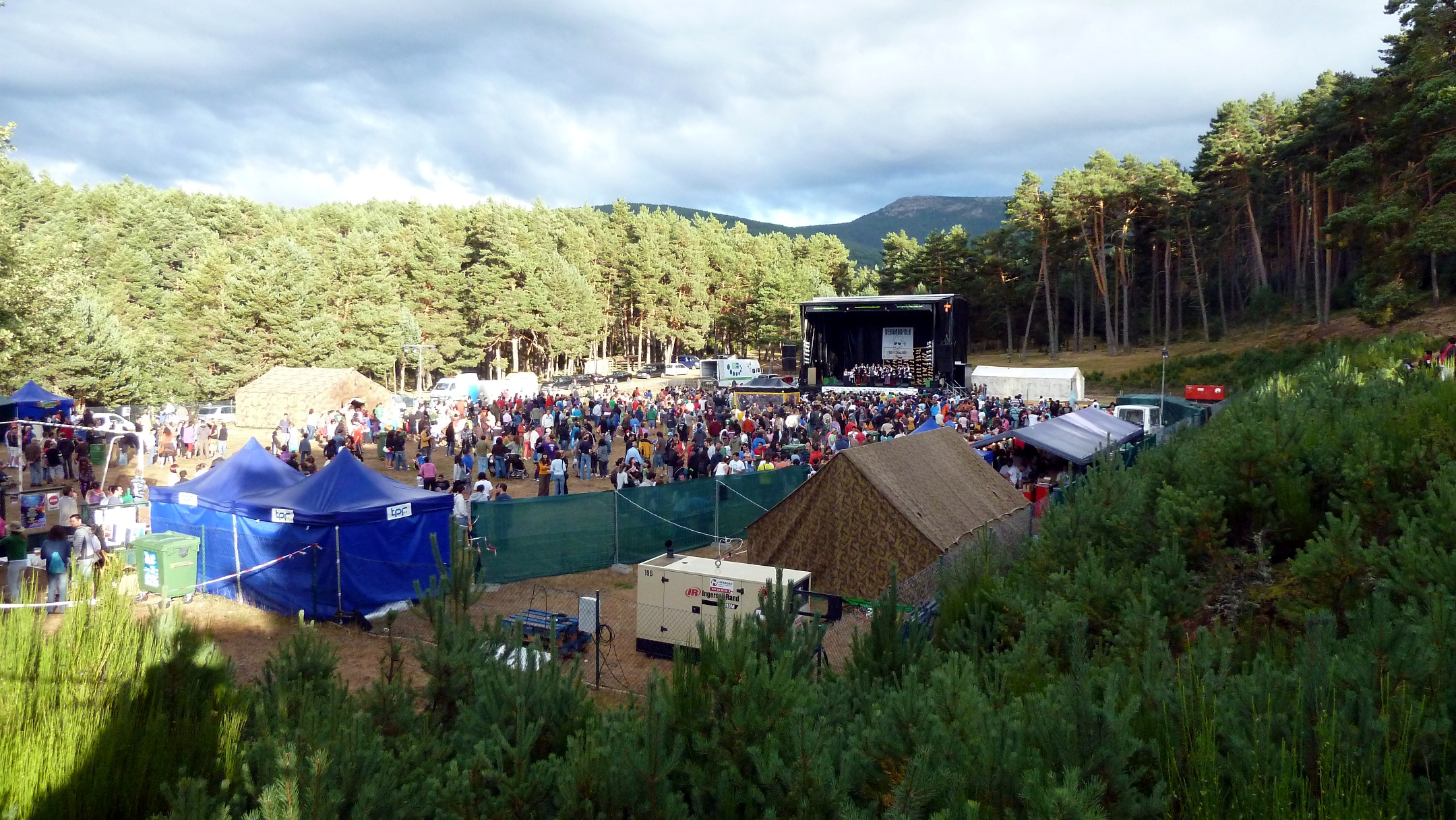
- Status: Defunct
- Genre: Folk music, Traditional music
- Frequency: Annual (2007–2021)
- Venue: Las Vegas football field
- Locations: Tolbaños de Arriba, Burgos, Spain
- Country: Spain
- Inaugurated: August 4, 2007
- Most recent: 2021
- Attendance: c. 6,500 (peak)
- Organizer: Asociación ¡Que la Sierra Baile!
- Website: www.demandafolk.com

Demandafolk was a free traditional music festival held annually in Tolbaños de Arriba, in the Sierra de la Demanda region of Burgos, Spain. It identified as a "non-conventional" festival because, while featuring prominent traditional music groups, its organization mirrored large-scale pop/rock festivals, providing camping areas, eco-friendly chemical toilets, showers, parking, and catering services.

Beyond musical performances, the festival included a craft market, traditional gastronomy (caldereta tastings), cross-country running, parades, traditional games, and environmental workshops for children.

== History ==
The first edition took place in 2007 and was held annually until its decline in the early 2020s. In 2013, it received the first Provincial Environment Prize of Burgos for its low-impact model and reforestation efforts.

The 2021 edition was decentralized across various towns in the Valdelaguna Valley and Huerta de Arriba due to COVID-19 restrictions. The 2022 edition was canceled due to extreme wildfire risks during a heatwave. Following further cancellations and organizational shifts, the festival was definitively terminated in 2024.

== Sustainability ==
A core component of the festival was environmental mitigation. Every March, volunteers conducted cleaning and infrastructure improvement sessions to offset the footprint of the approximately 6,000 attendees.

== Location ==
The festival was held at the "Las Vegas" field, located between Tolbaños de Arriba and Tolbaños de Abajo at an altitude of over 1,200 meters.
