= Vallejimeno =

Village in Burgos, Spain

Vallejimeno Vallegimeno
- Locality
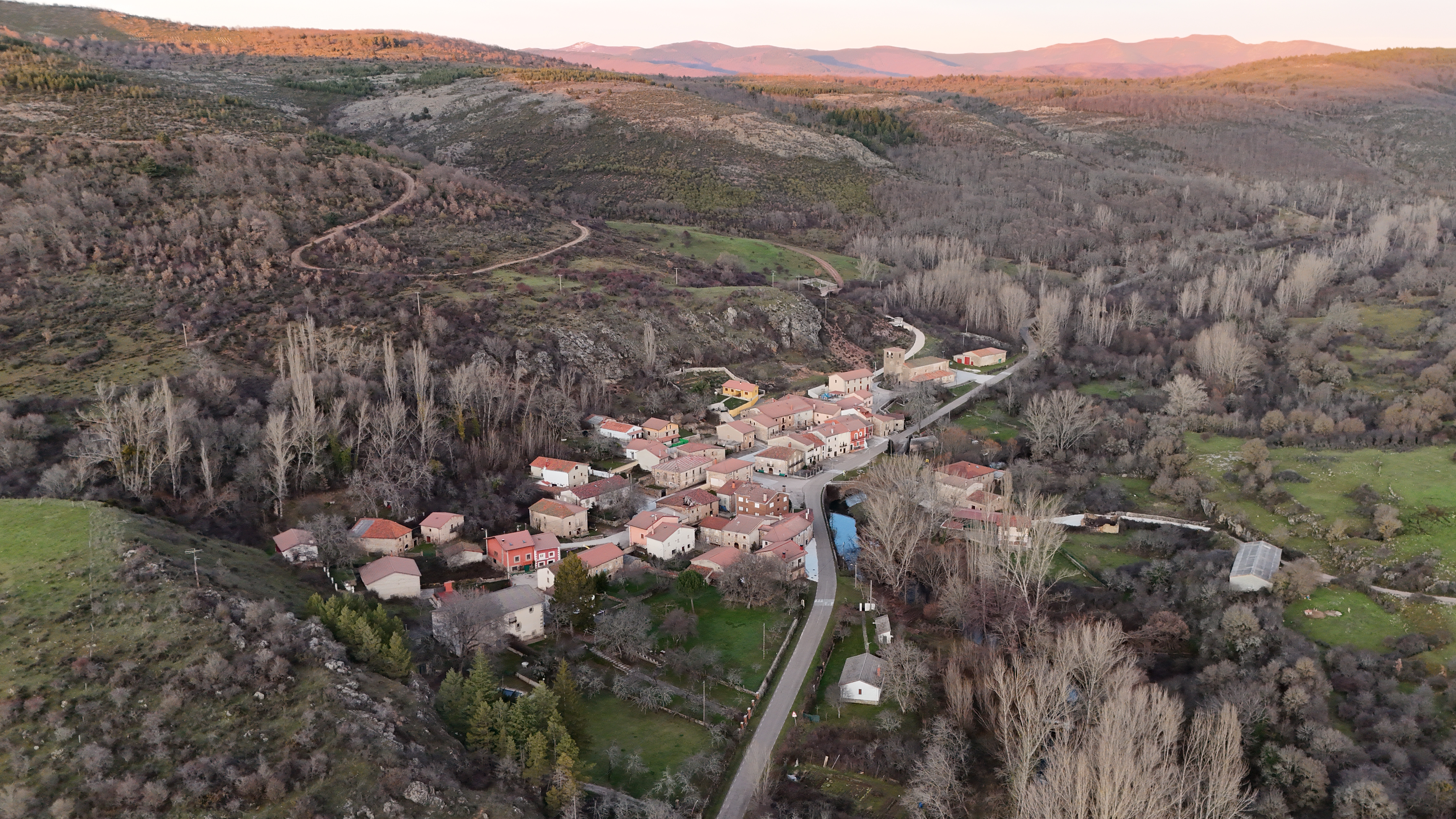
- Aerial view of the village Vallejimeno

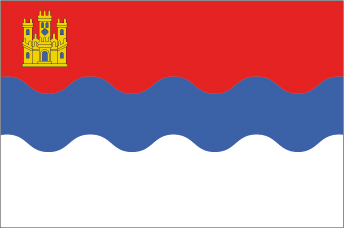
- Flag
- Interactive map of Vallejimeno
- Coordinates: 42°07′3.09″N 3°11′4.93″W
- Country: Spain
- Province: Burgos
- Comarca: Sierra de la Demanda
- Municipality: Valle de Valdelaguna

Population (2024)
  - Total: 11
- Website: Vallejimeno (Valle de Valdelaguna)

Vallejimeno (Spanish pronunciation: [bˌaʎeximˈeno]), also known as Vallegimeno, is a locality belonging to the municipality of Valle de Valdelaguna, inside the province of Burgos, autonomous community of Castile and León, Spain. It belongs to the comarca of Sierra de la Demanda and to the judicial district of Salas de los Infantes. According to the 2024 census (INE), Vallejimeno has a population of 11 inhabitants.

The toponym refers to the medieval compound name Vallejimeno, translated as "valley of Jimeno," combining the Latin vallis ("valley") with the anthroponym Jimeno (also written Gimeno). Its etymology is debated: a Basque theory links it to Semeno, derived from seme ("son"); a Hebraic-Latin theory connects it to Simeno, a variant of Simon meaning "he has heard". The settlement is first documented in 932 in a donation to the Monastery of San Pedro de Arlanza during the Reconquista and as part of the repopulation of the County of Castile during the 9th century and 10th centuries.

The village's heritage includes the San Martín Obispo Church, built in the 17th century, notable for its Romanesque baptismal font and Baroque altarpieces. Located outside the village centre is the Hermitage of Santa María. It also features the so-called Romano and Medieval bridges over the Tejero River, which divides Vallejimeno into two neighborhoods; despite their names, their exact dates of construction are not documented. Several houses in the village constitute examples of traditional rural architecture, historically linked to livestock-owning households in the area. The surrounding territory also includes dehesas associated with traditional agrosilvopastoral land use, in addition to the beech and oak forests characteristic of the Sierra de la Demanda. Among the area's natural features is the “Quejigo Bonito”, a singular oak listed in the provincial catalogue of notable trees.

Gallery

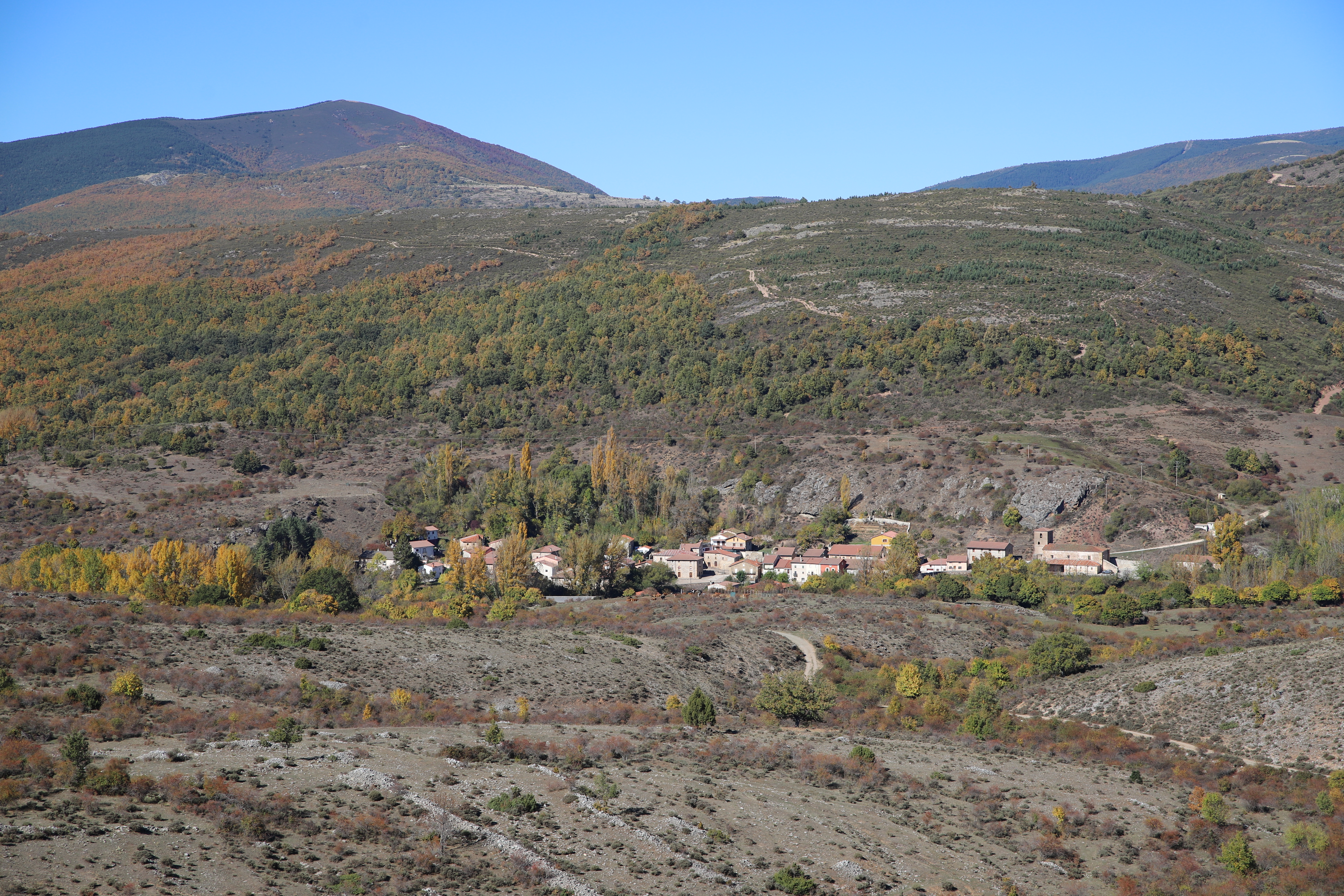
Vallejimeno from the south

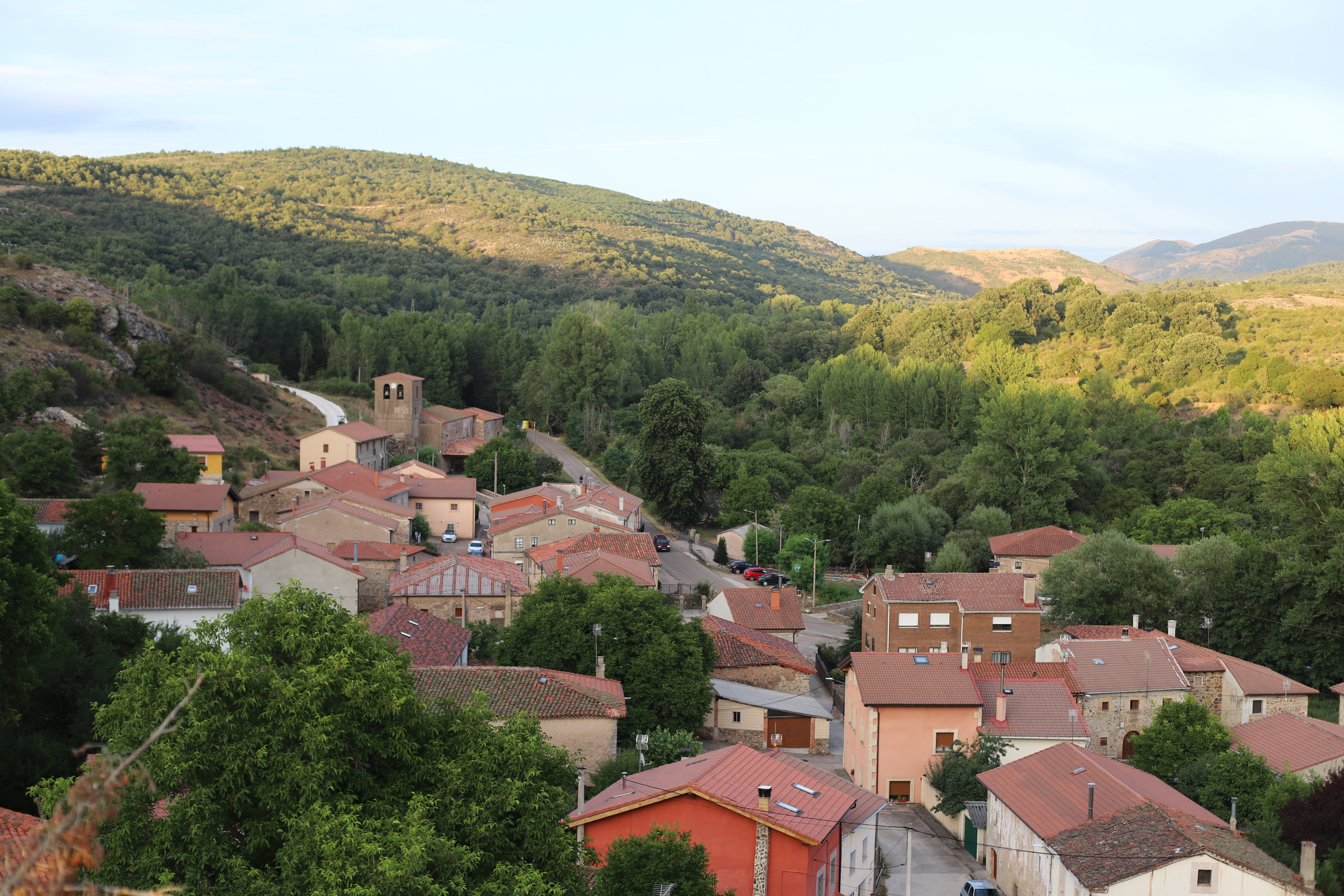
Vallejimeno from the west

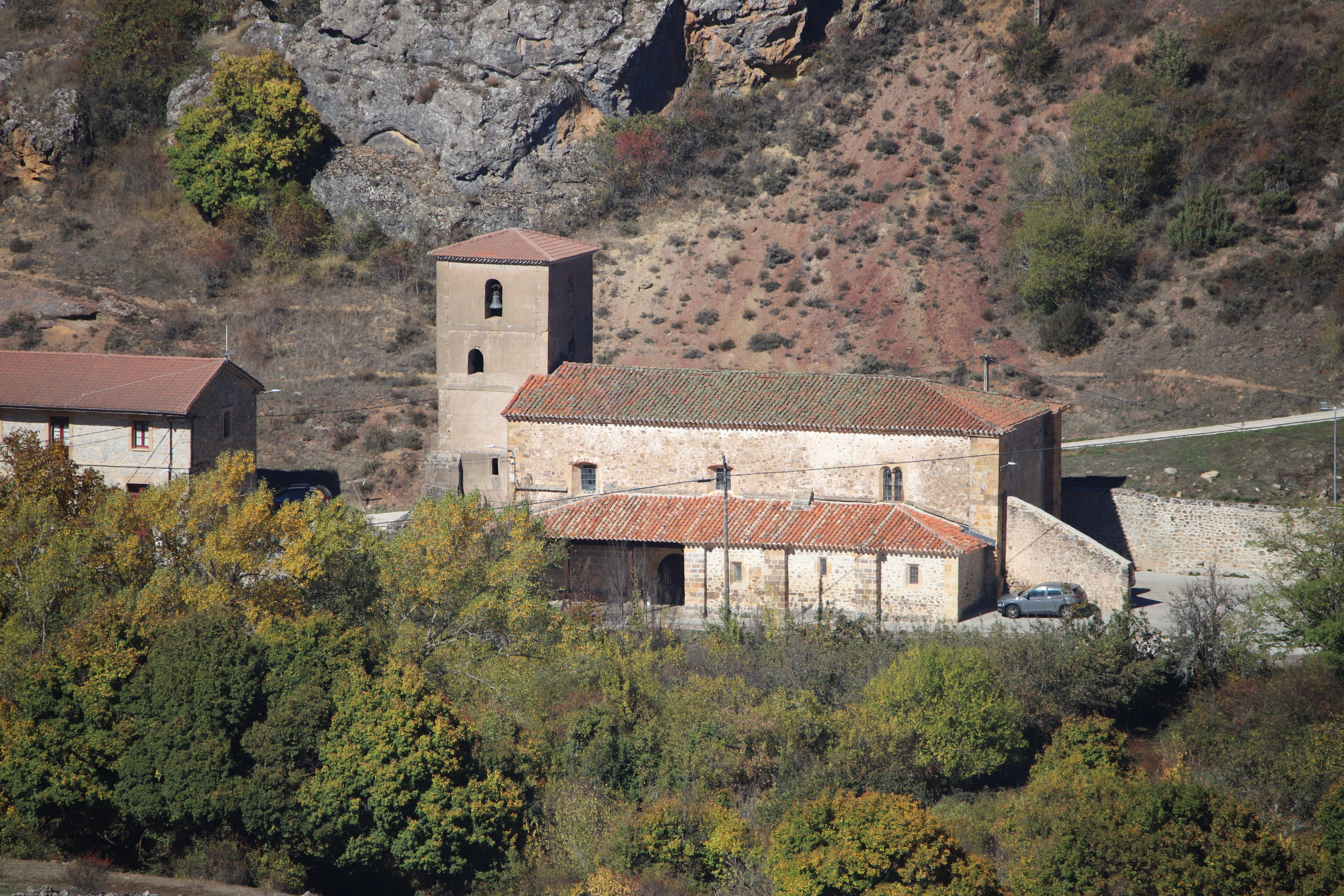
Church of San Martín Obispo

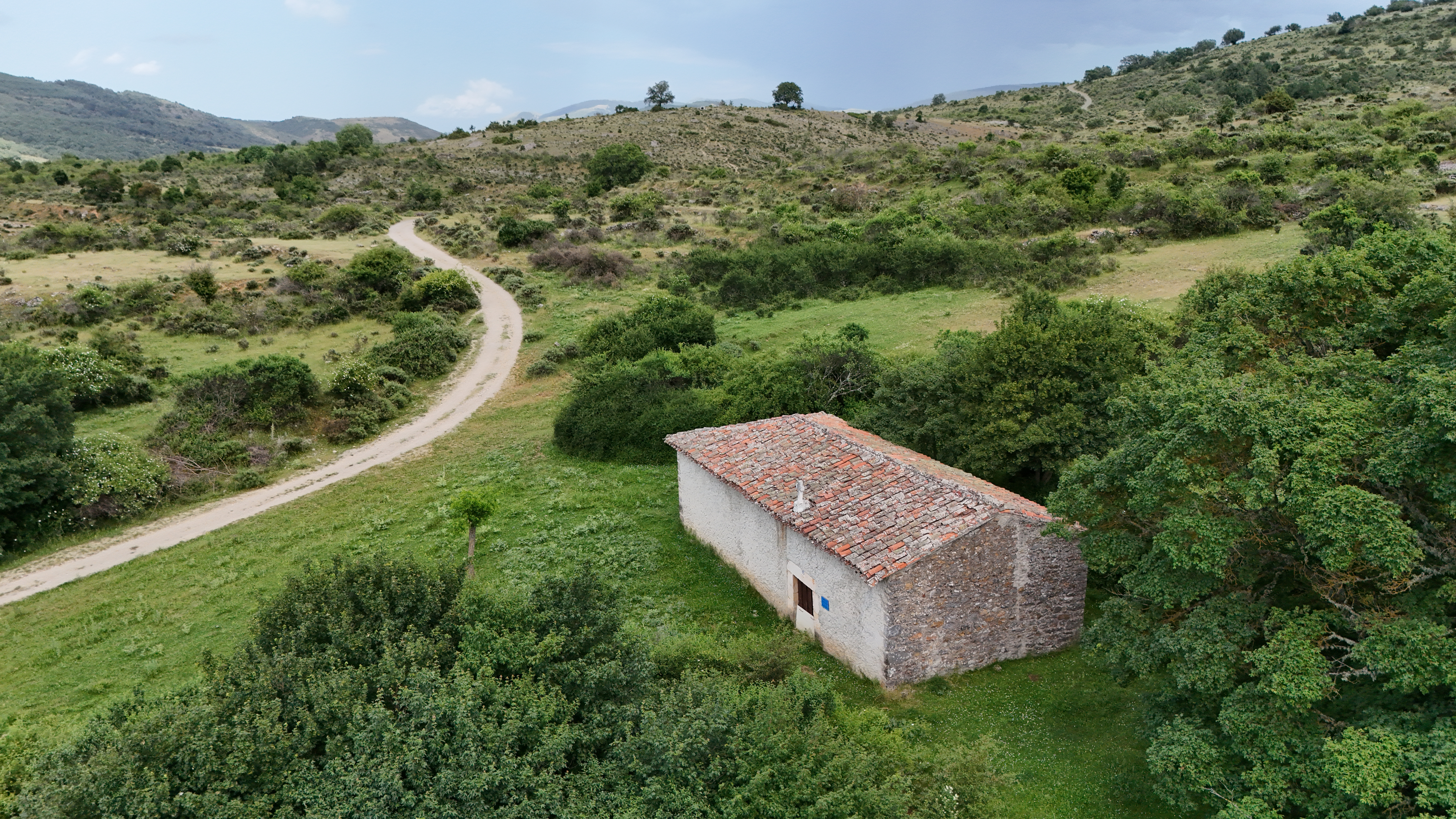
Hermitage of Santa María

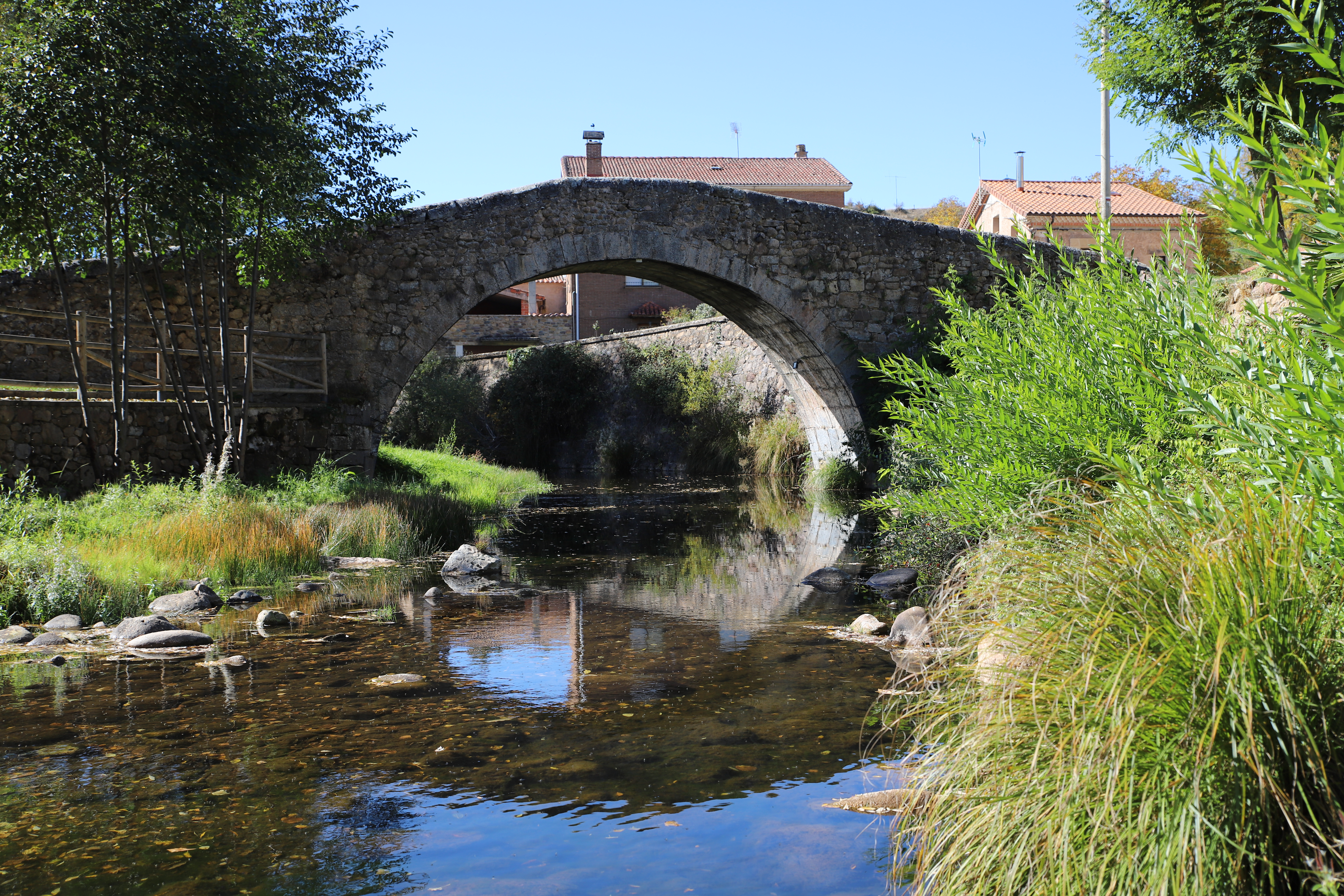
Medieval Bridge

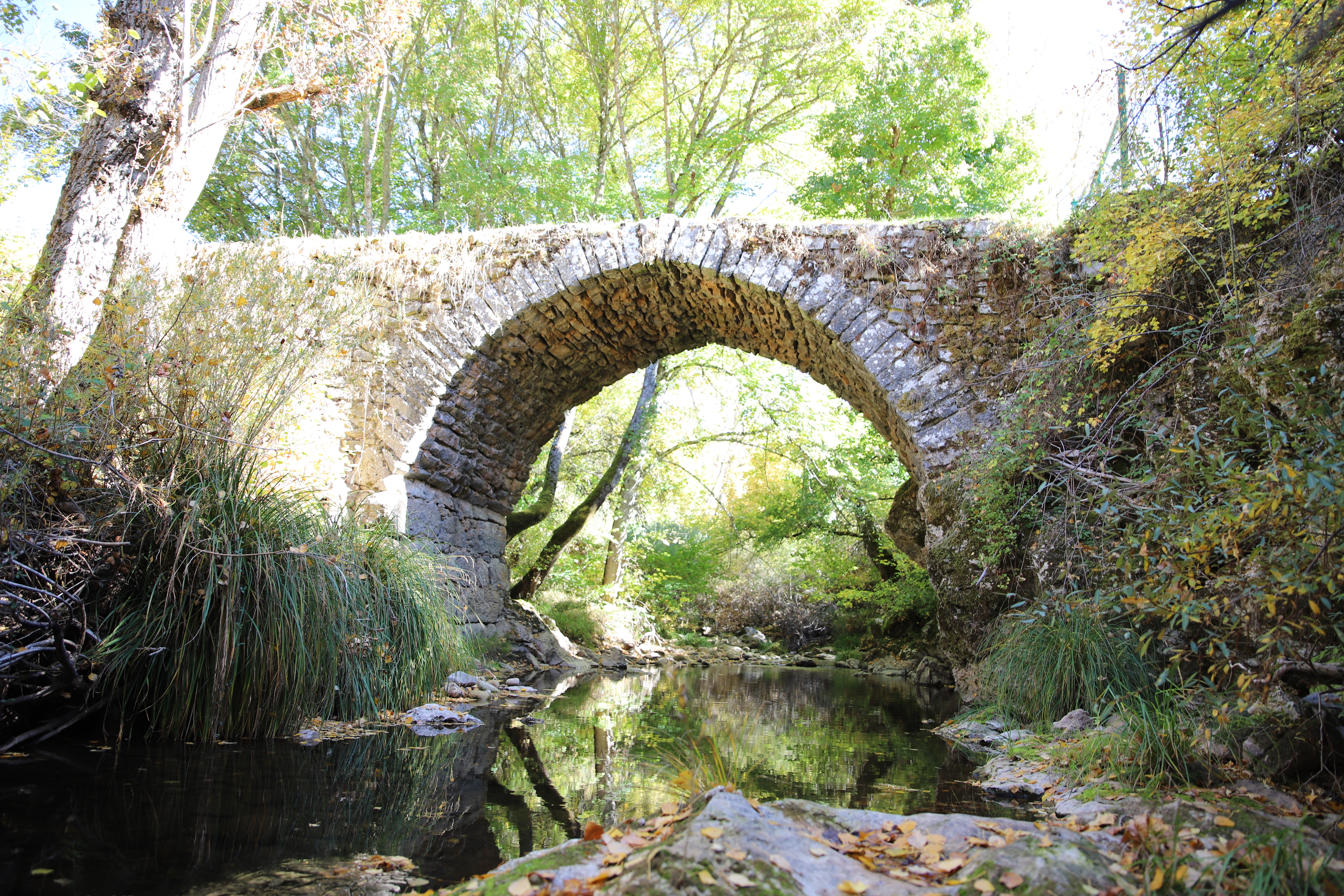
Romano Bridge
