= Huerta de Abajo =

Village in Burgos, Spain

- Locality
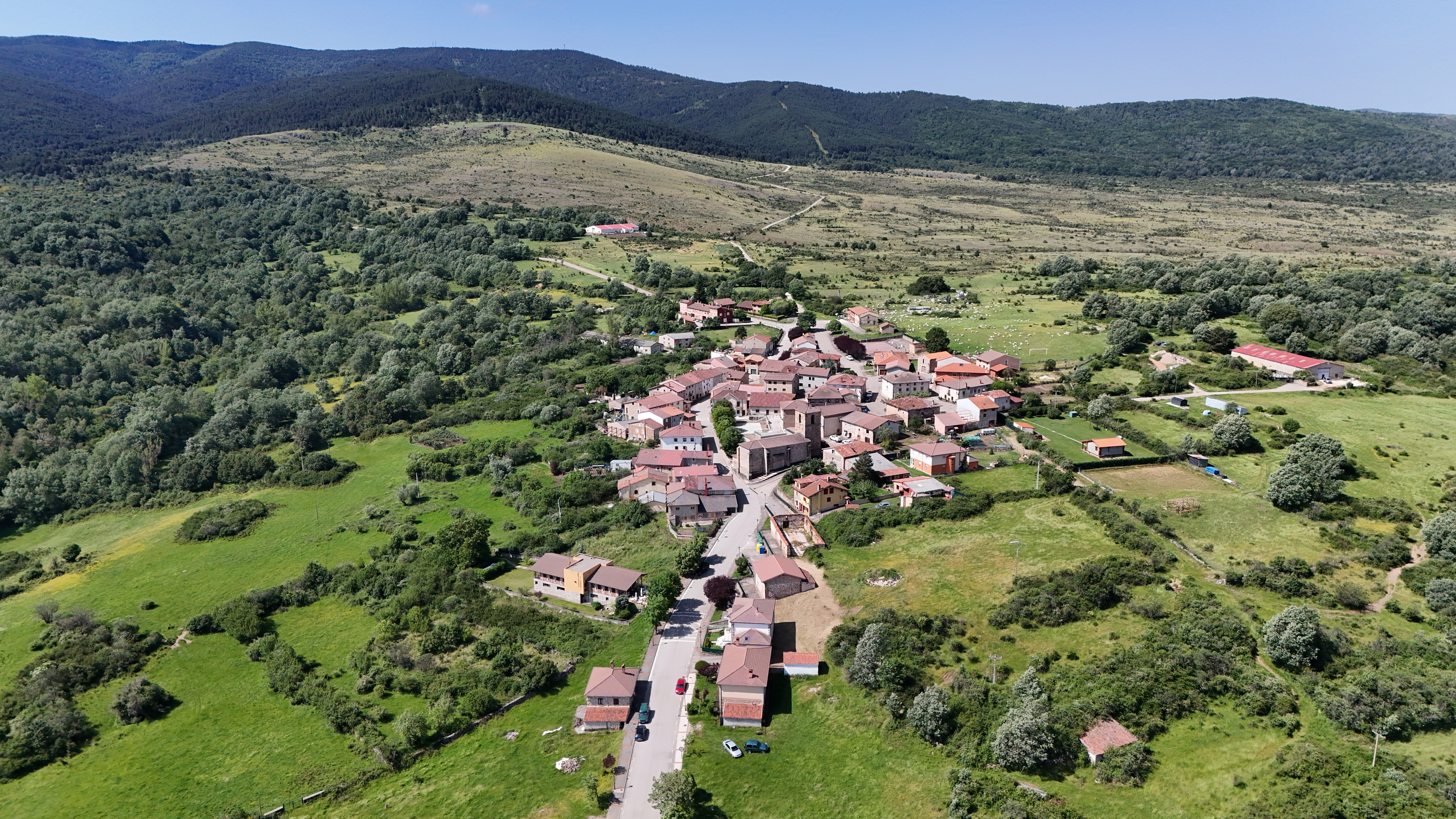
- View of Huerta de Abajo
- Interactive map of Huerta de Abajo
- Coordinates: 42°06′51″N 3°08′51″W
- Country: Spain
- Province: Burgos
- Comarca: Sierra de la Demanda
- Municipality: Valle de Valdelaguna
- Elevation: 1,166 m (3,825 ft)

Population (2024)
  - Total: 72
- Demonym: Huertano/-a
- Postal code: 09614

Huerta de Abajo (Spanish pronunciation: [ˈweɾta ðe aˈβaxo]) is a locality and the administrative seat of the municipality of Valle de Valdelaguna, inside the province of Burgos, autonomous community of Castile and León (Spain). It belongs to the comarca of Sierra de la Demanda and to the judicial district of Salas de los Infantes. According to the 2024 census (INE), Huerta de Abajo has a population of 72 inhabitants.

The toponym is a compound name, literally meaning "lower orchard", combining huerta, derived from Spanish huerto and ultimately from the Latin hortum ("garden, orchard"), with abajo, meaning "below" or "lower". The name distinguishes it from neighbouring Huerta de Arriba, literally meaning "upper orchard", with both settlements situated along the Tejero River, Huerta de Abajo lying downstream from Huerta de Arriba.

The village's heritage includes the Church of Santa Cristina, whose interior preserves a Romanesque baptismal font dating from the late 12th or early 13th century, decorated with vegetal motifs and an inscription dedicated to Saint Christina. The village also preserves the remains of La Previsora, a former ironworks that began operating in 1877 and incorporated blast-furnace technology, reflecting the area's industrial and mining heritage. A bridge crosses the Tejero River, which runs south of the village and forms part of the landscape of the Valle de Valdelaguna. Traditional rural architecture, including some houses built of reddish stone typical of the Sierra de la Demanda's vernacular architecture, is also characteristic of the settlement.

Gallery

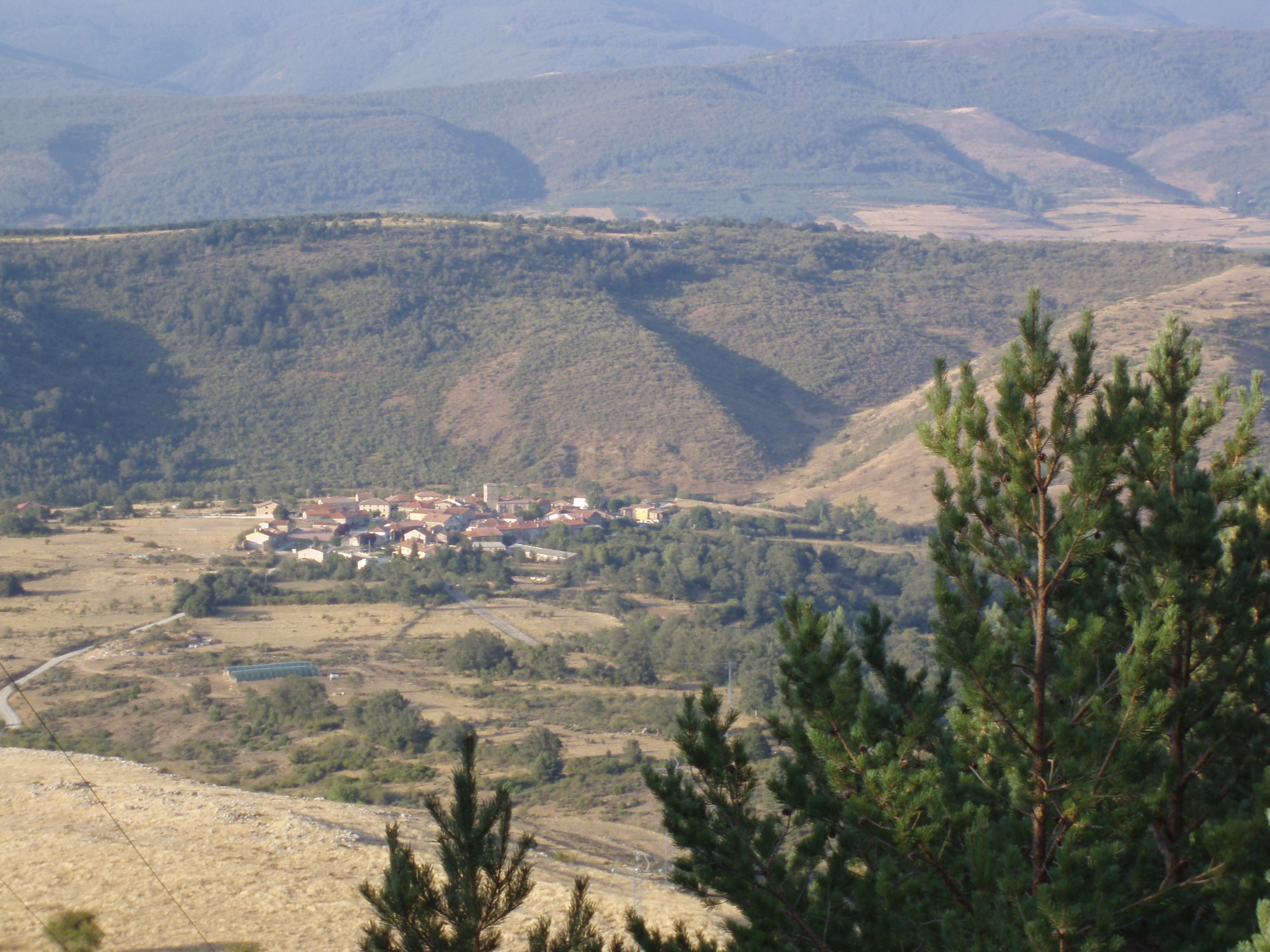
Huerta de Abajo from nearby mountains

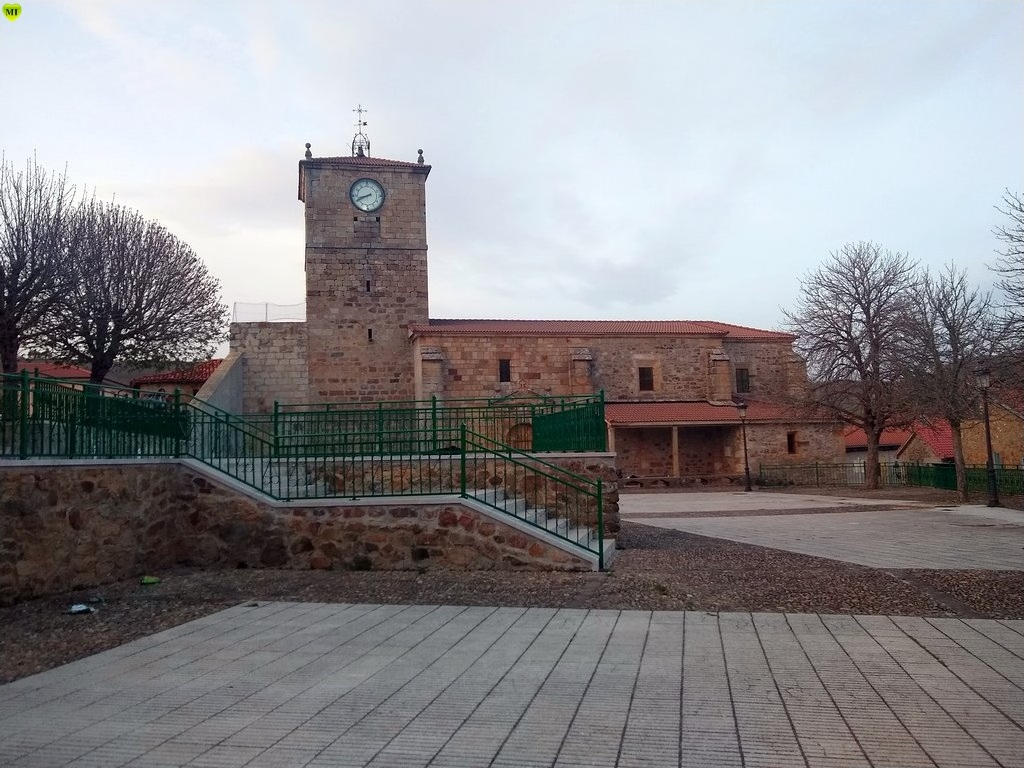
Church of Santa Cristina

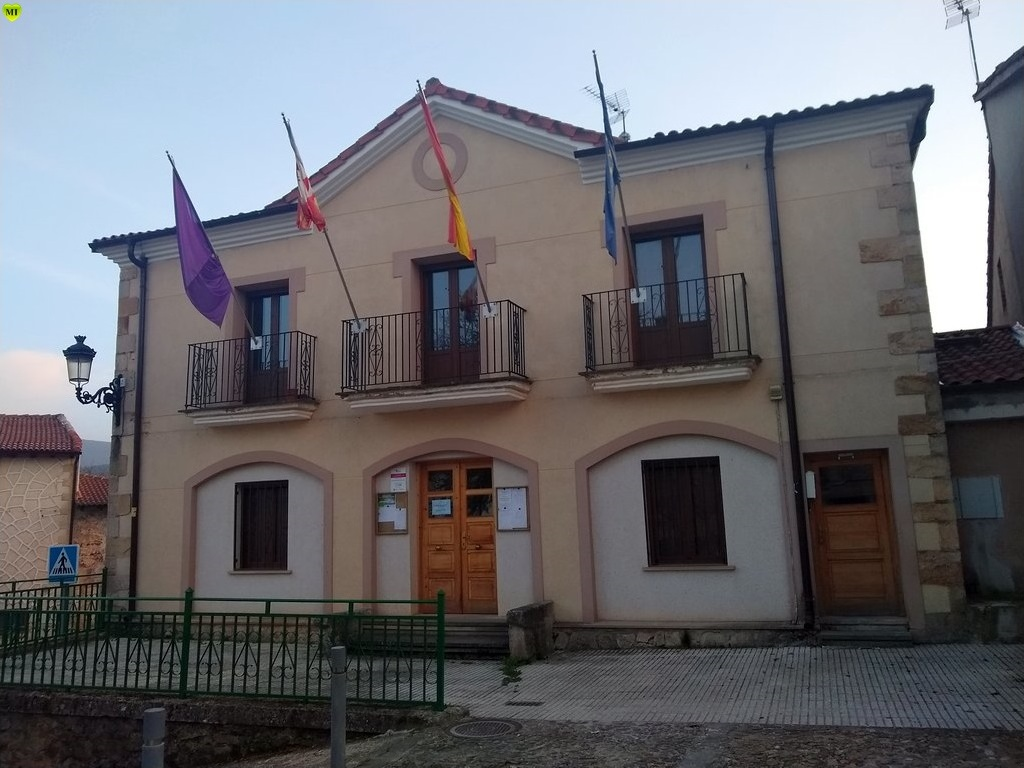
Town hall of Valle de Valdelaguna

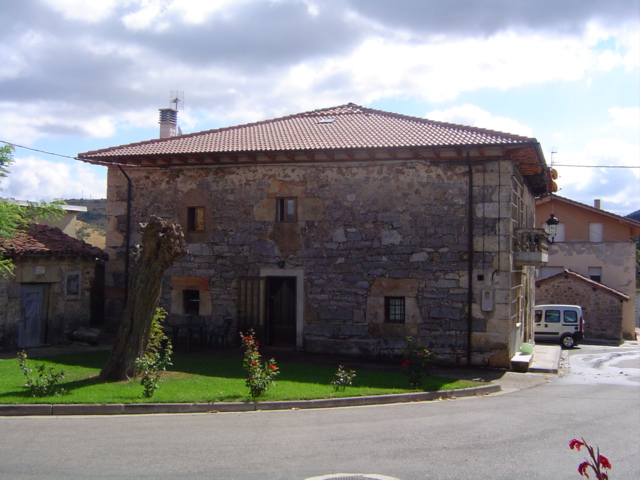
Traditional house in Huerta de Abajo

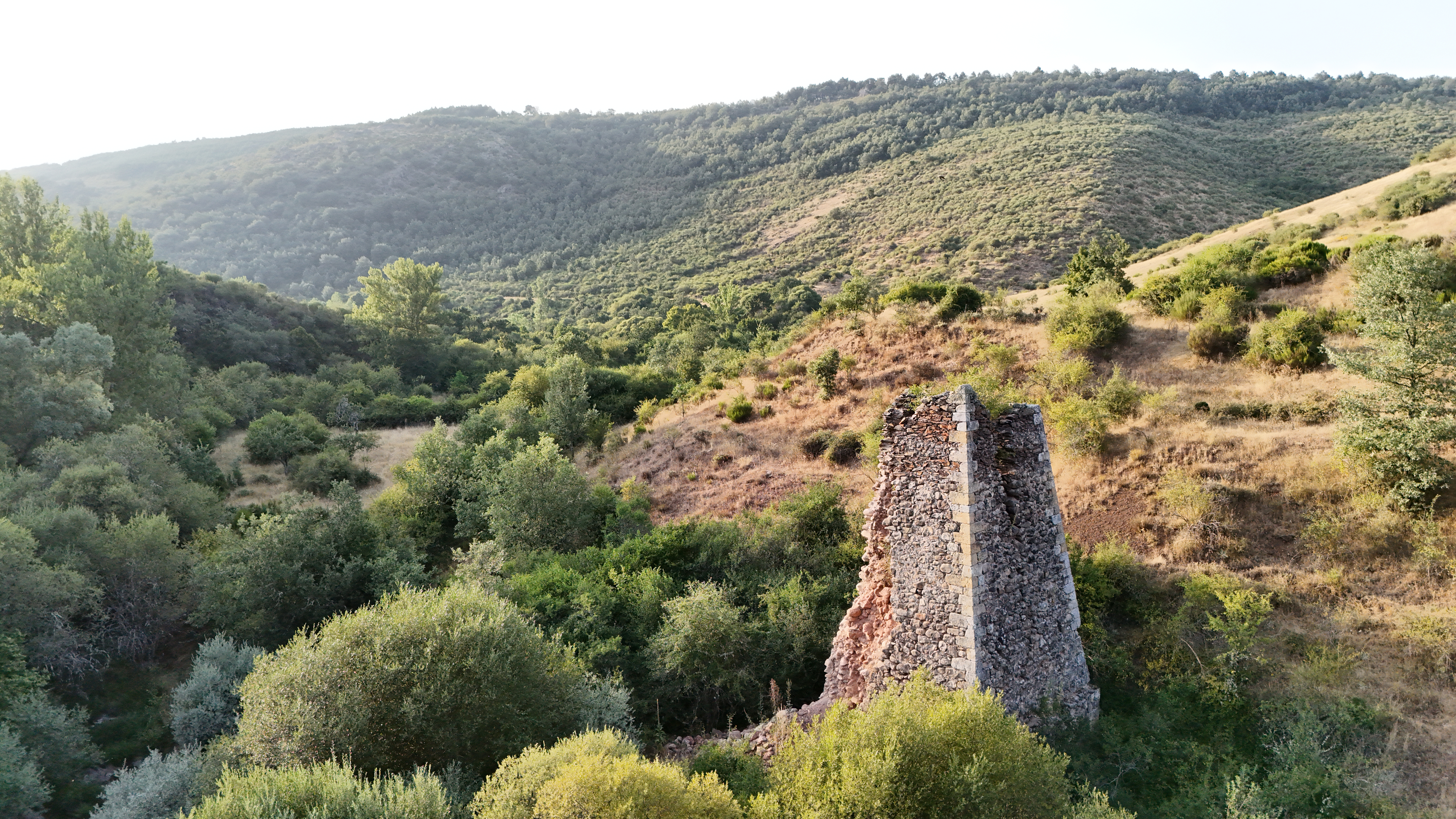
La Previsora, abandoned foundry

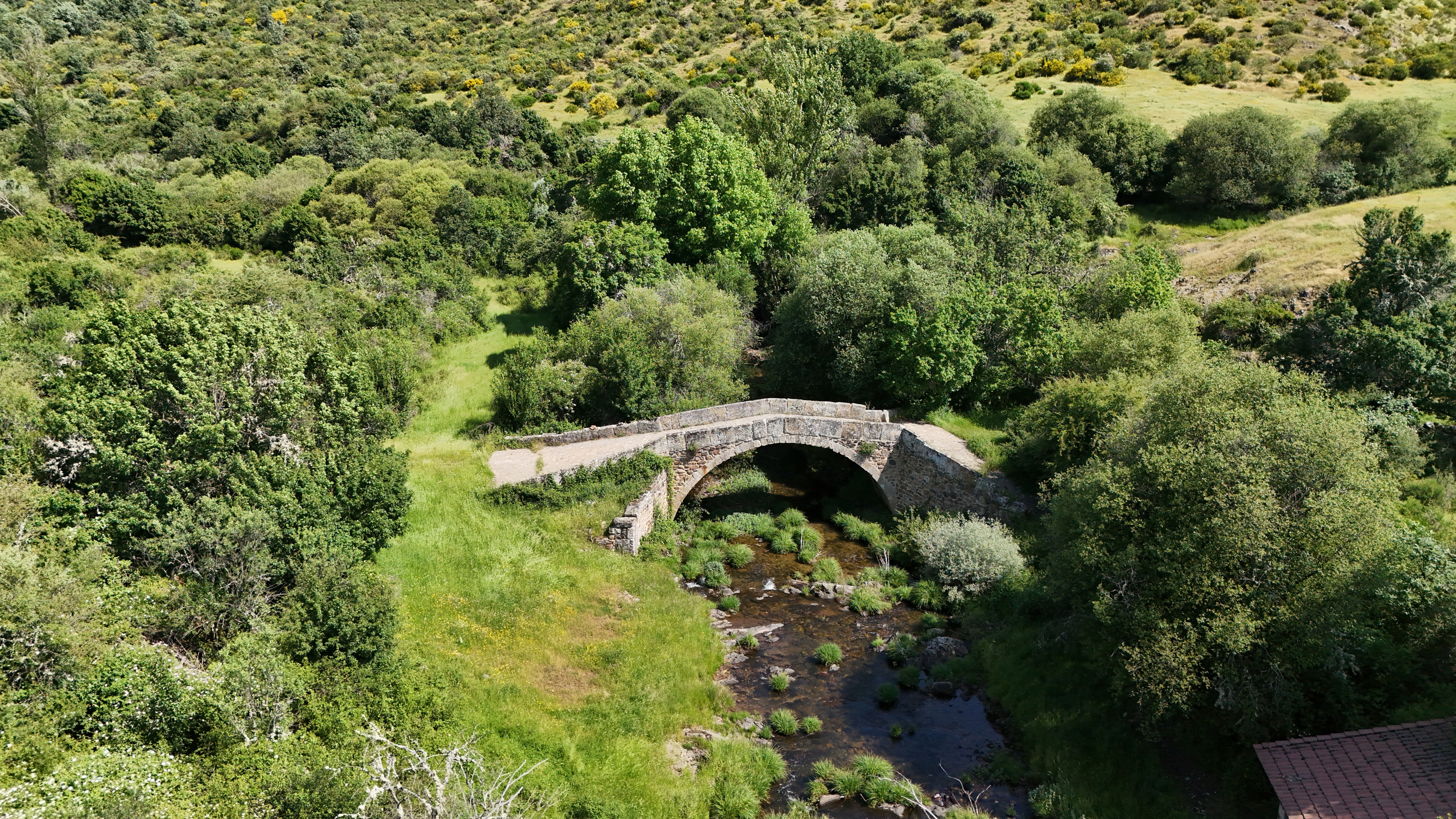
Bridge over Tejero River
