= Quintanilla de Urrilla =

Village in Burgos, Spain

- Locality
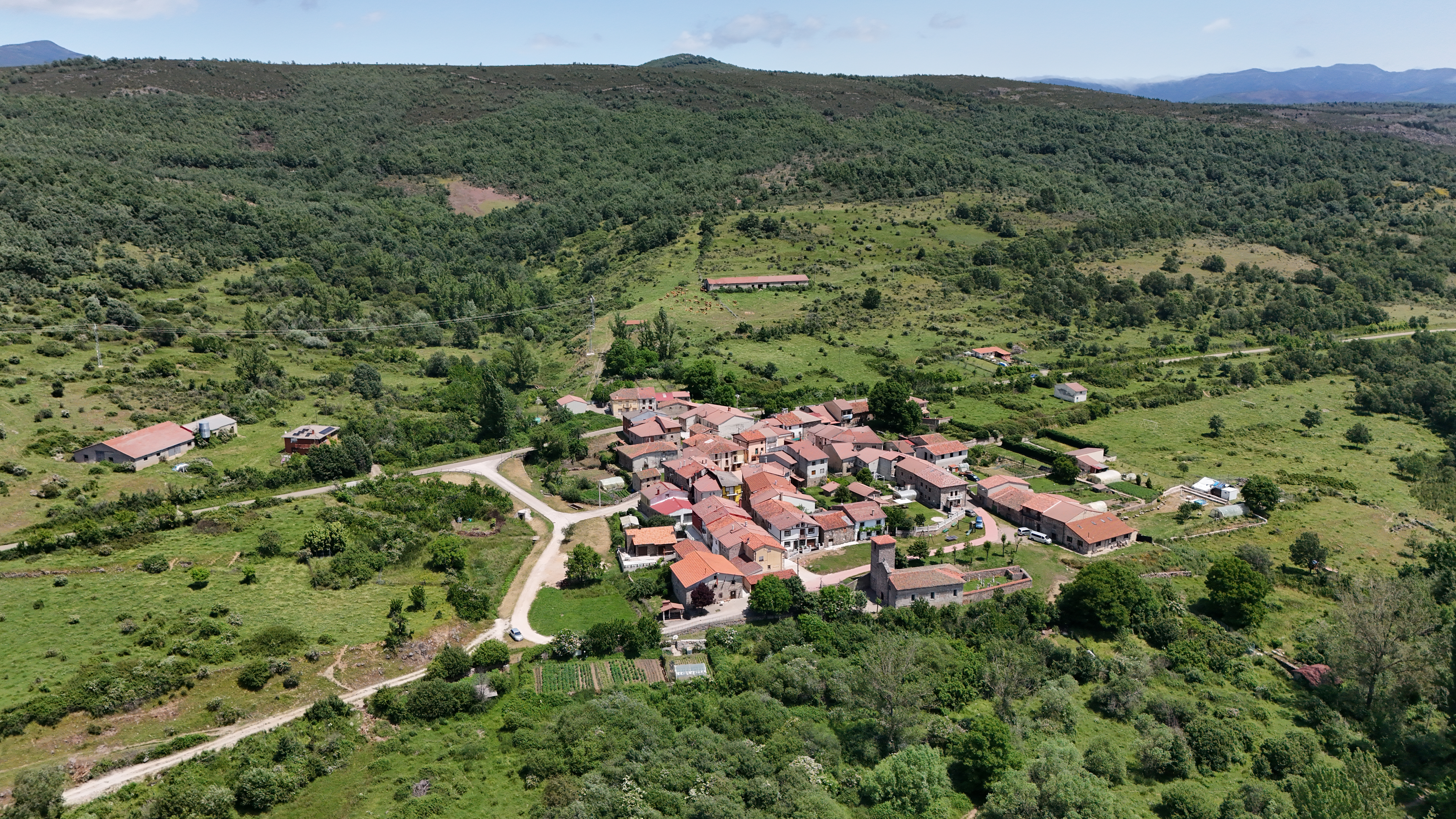
- View of Quintanilla de Urrilla
- Interactive map of Quintanilla de Urrilla
- Coordinates: 42°06′56″N 3°11′59″W
- Country: Spain
- Province: Burgos
- Comarca: Sierra de la Demanda
- Municipality: Valle de Valdelaguna
- Elevation: 1,078 m (3,537 ft)

Population (2023)
  - Total: 14
- Postal code: 09614

Quintanilla de Urrilla (Spanish pronunciation: [kˌintanˈiʎa dˈe uɾɾˈiʎa]) is a locality belonging to the municipality of Valle de Valdelaguna, inside the province of Burgos, autonomous community of Castile and León, Spain. It belongs to the comarca of Sierra de la Demanda and to the judicial district of Salas de los Infantes. According to the 2024 census (INE), Quintanilla de Urrilla has a population of 14 inhabitants.

The village's heritage includes the San Martín Obispo Church. Located outside the village centre is the Hermitage of San Bartolomé. It also features a medieval bridge over the Tejero River. Several houses in the village constitute examples of traditional rural architecture. Located west of the village is the "Pozo de Fuentenegra", a 6.5-metre-deep natural spring whose seasonally varying waters are tied to a local folklore legend about a family that fell in and disappeared.

Gallery

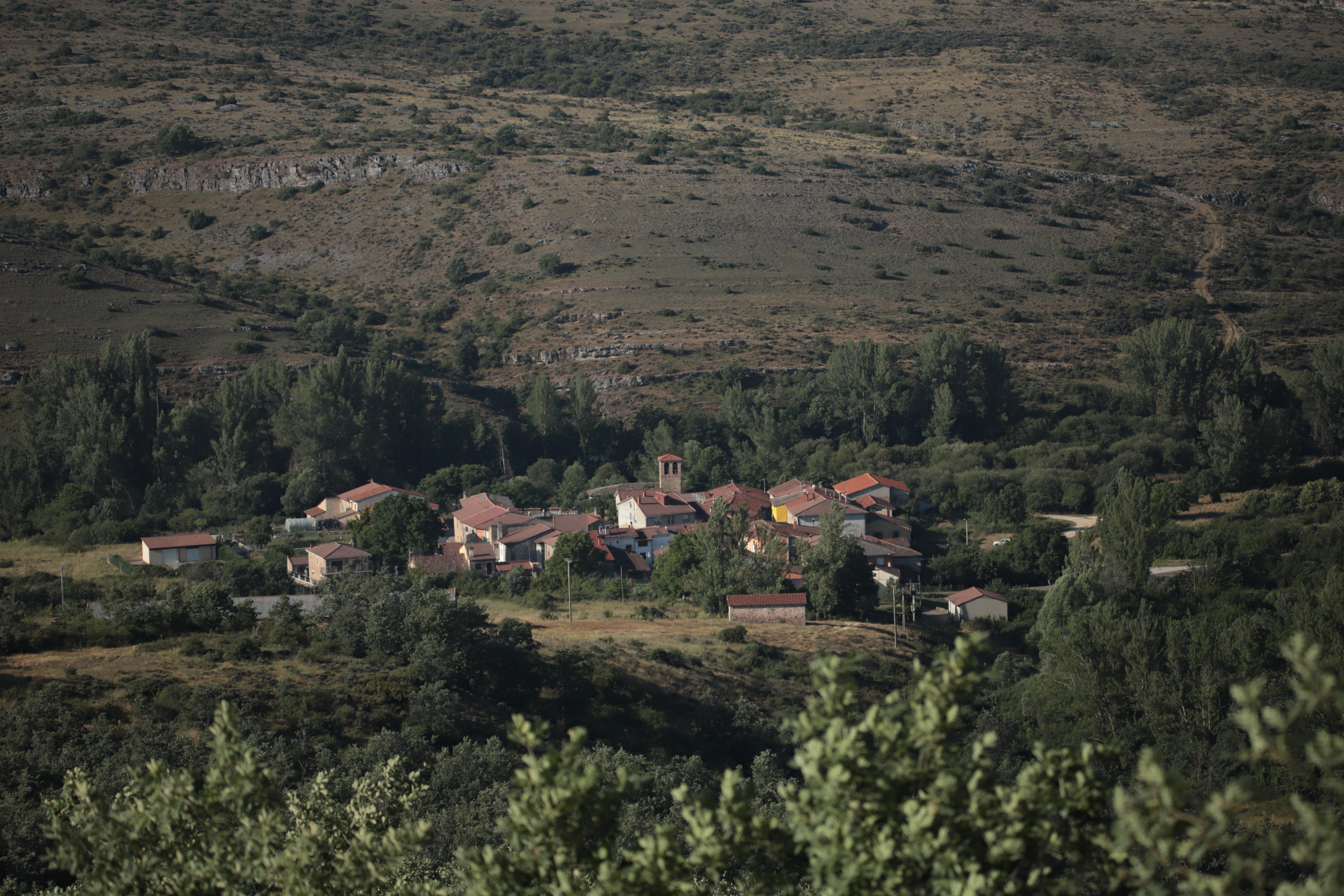
View of Quintanilla de Urrilla from the north

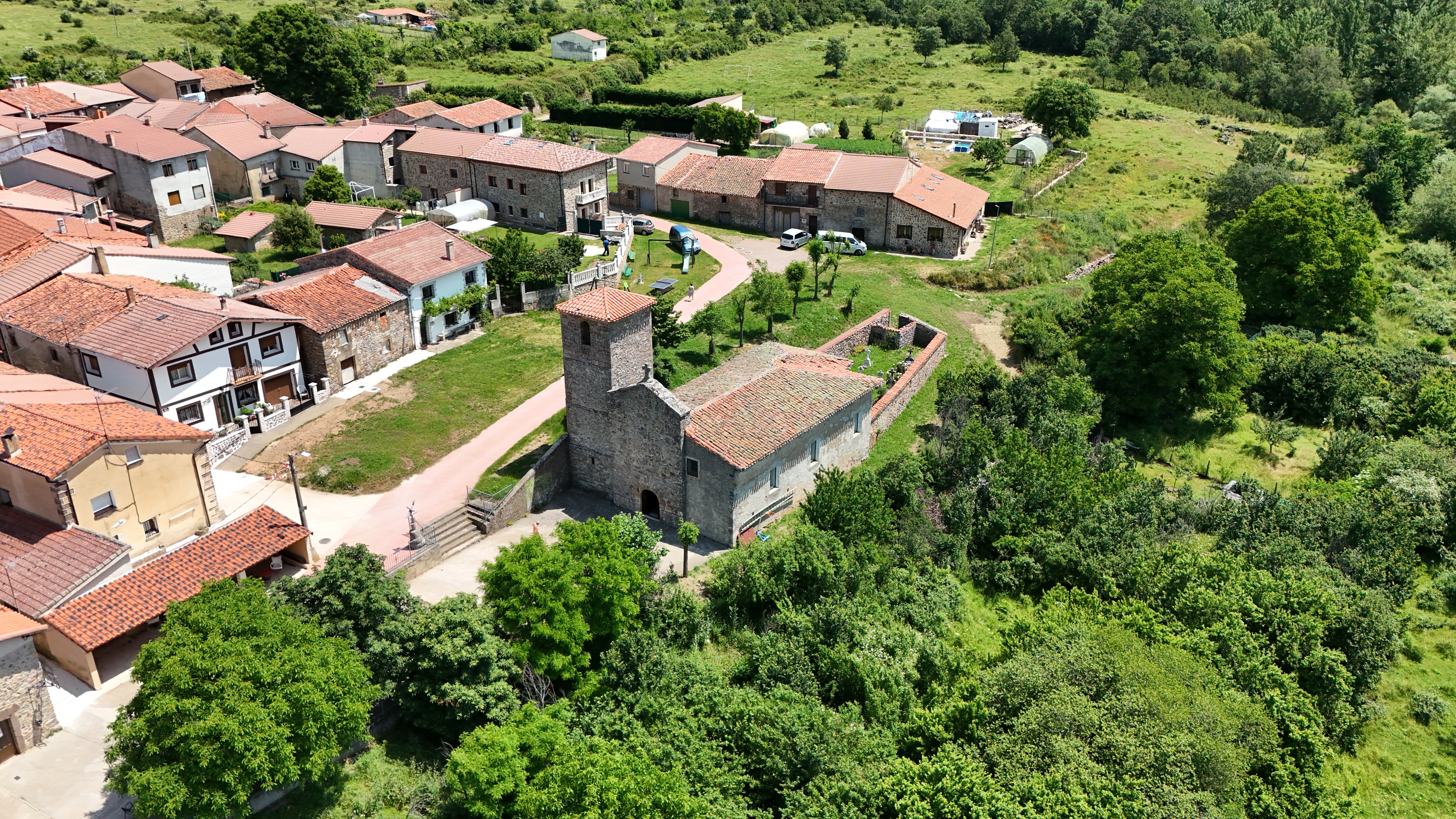
Church of San Martín Obispo

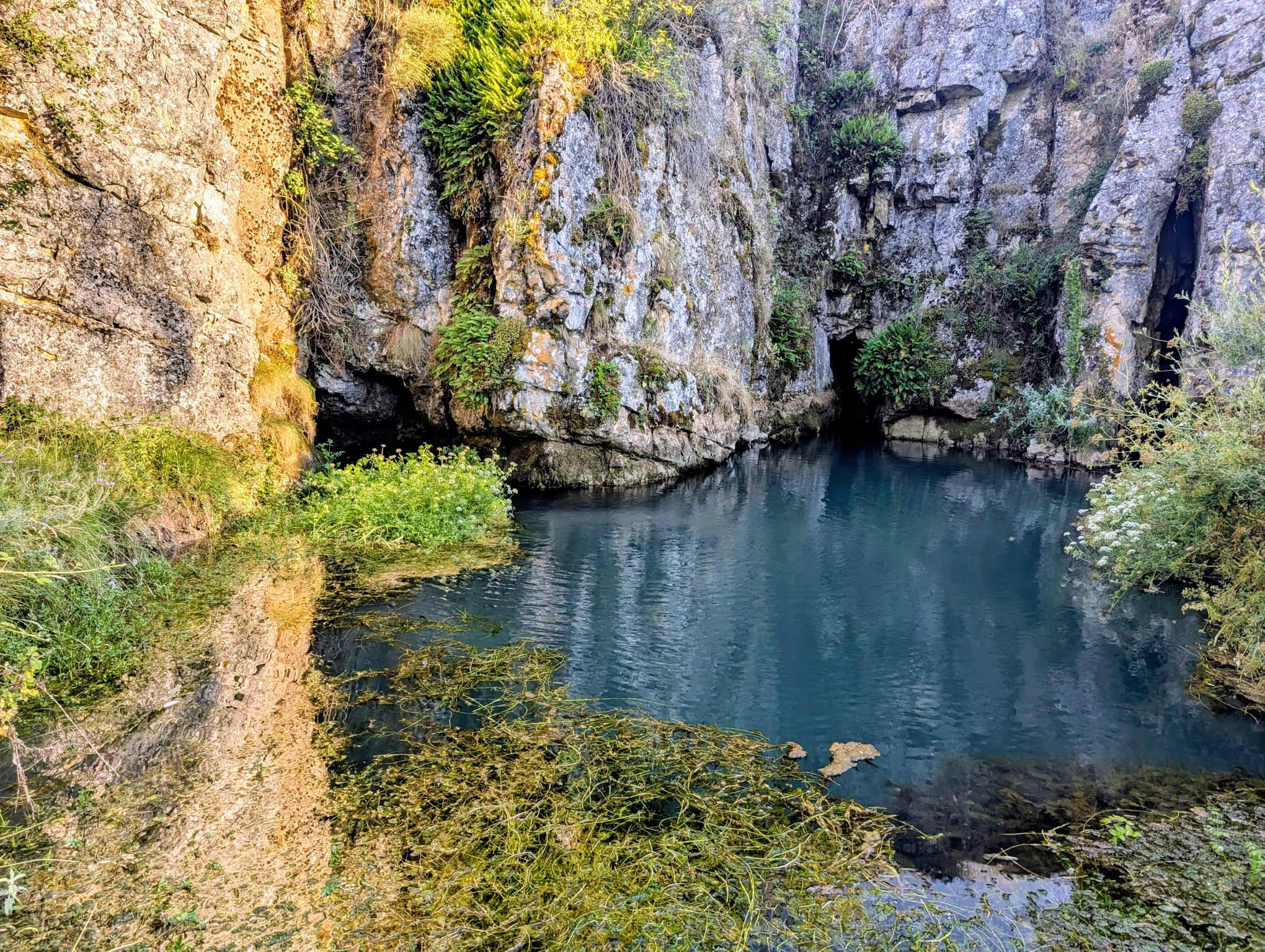
Pozo de Fuentenegra, a spring nearby
