= Valle de Valdelaguna =

Municipality in Castile and León, Spain

- municipality
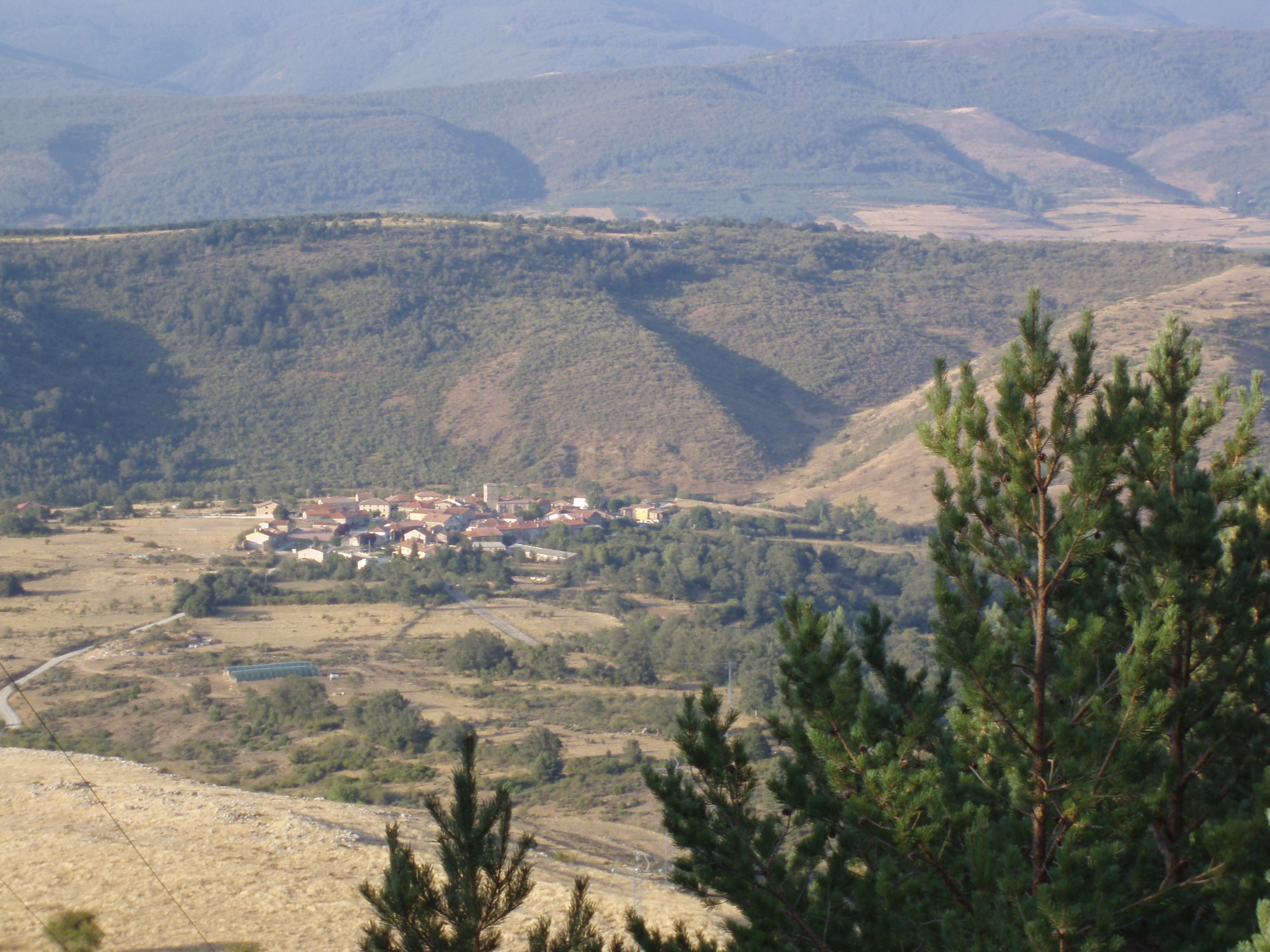
- View of the valley and Huerta de Abajo

- Location within Spain
- Coordinates: 42°05′33″N 3°7′57″W
- Country: Spain
- Autonomous community: Castile and León
- Province: Burgos
- Municipality: Valle de Valdelaguna

Government
  - Mayor: Miguel Ángel Salas González (PP)

Area
  - Total: 92.66 km^{2} (35.78 sq mi)
- Elevation: 1,166 m (3,825 ft)

Population (2025-01-01)
  - Total: 187
  - Density: 2.02/km^{2} (5.23/sq mi)
- Time zone: UTC+1 (CET)
  - Summer (DST): UTC+2 (CEST)
- Postal Code: 09614
- Telephone prefix: 947
- Climate: Cfb
- Website: Valle de Valdelaguna

Valle de Valdelaguna (Spanish pronunciation: [ˈbaʎe ðe ˌβalðelaˈɣuna]) is a municipality located in the province of Burgos, autonomous community of Castile and León, Spain. It belongs to the comarca of Sierra de la Demanda and to the judicial district of Salas de los Infantes. According to the 2024 census (INE), the municipality has a population of 187 inhabitants. The municipality covers an area of 92.66 square kilometres (35.78 sq mi). Its capital is the town of Huerta de Abajo.

== Toponymy ==
The toponym is a compound name and contains a pleonasm, literally meaning "Valley of the Valley of the Lake". It combines the Spanish terms valle, meaning "valley", with Valdelaguna, formed from val, an apocopated form of valle, ultimately derived from Latin vallis ("valley"), and laguna, meaning "lake" or "pond". The pleonastic repetition of the valley element reflects the compound formation of the name, while laguna refers to the glacial lakes of the surrounding Sierra de la Demanda mountain range, including the nearby Neila Lakes and other glacial lakes such as Laguna de Ahedillo and Laguna de la Tejera.

== Localities of the municipality ==
- Bezares
- Huerta de Abajo (seat or capital)
- Quintanilla de Urrilla
- Tolbaños de Abajo
- Tolbaños de Arriba
- Vallejimeno
