= Tolbaños de Abajo =

Coordinates: 42°06′N 3°08′W

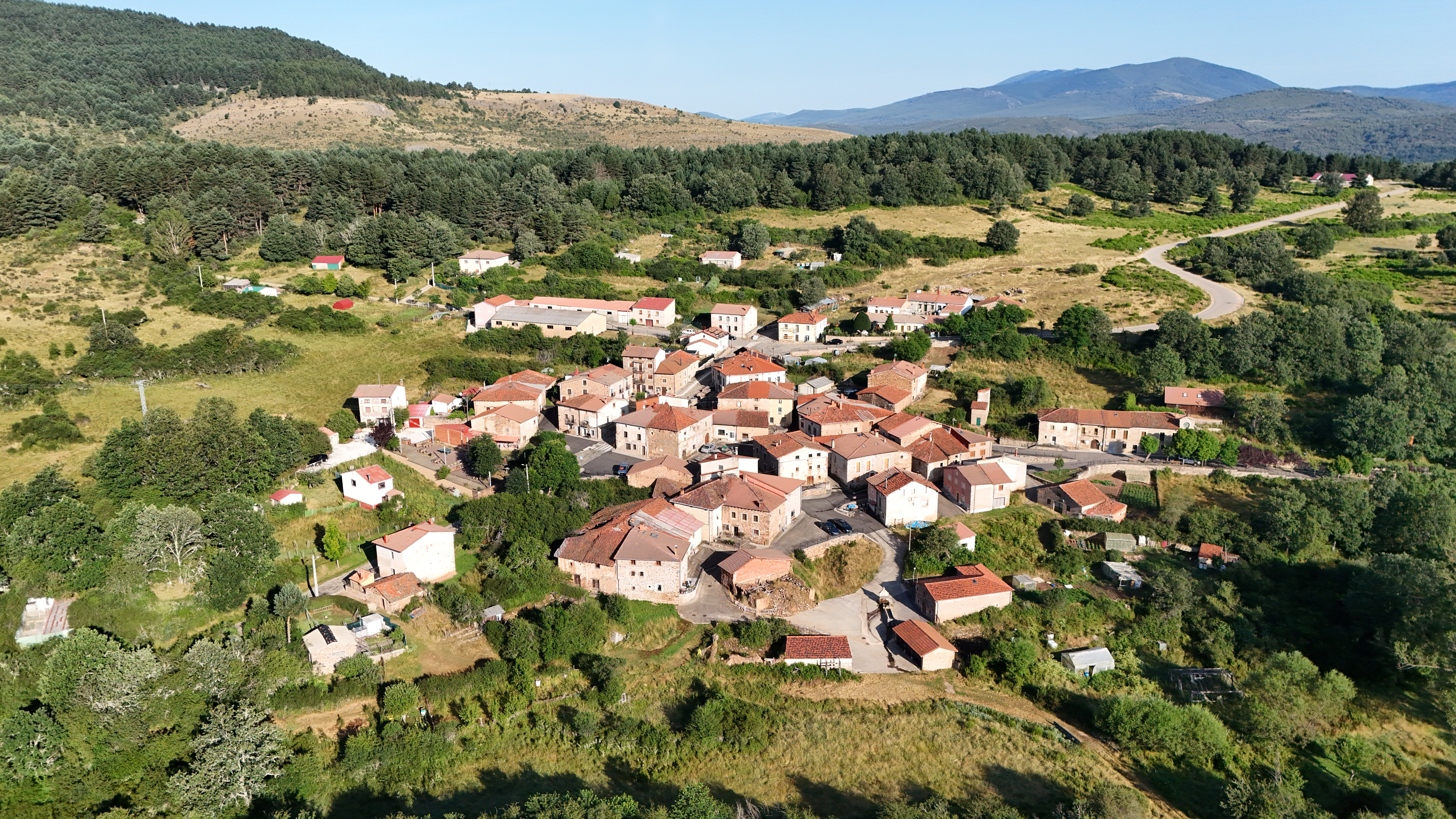
View of Tolbaños de Abajo from the east.

Tolbaños de Abajo is a village in the municipality of Valle de Valdelaguna located southeast of the province of Burgos, Castilla y León (Spain).

In Tolbaños de Abajo may be one of the better preserved meadows of the Iberian Peninsula, with specimens of oak (Quercus pyrenaica) and sessile oak (Quercus petraea), the latter are close to 400 years of age. There are also beautiful examples of holly.
