= Huerta de Arriba =

Coordinates: 42°07′N 3°05′W

- Municipality
- View of Huerta de Arriba, 2025

- Flag Coat of arms
- Interactive map of Huerta de Arriba
- Country: Spain
- Autonomous community: Castile and León
- Province: Burgos
- Comarca: Sierra de la Demanda

Area
  - Total: 33 km^{2} (13 sq mi)
- Elevation: 1,205 m (3,953 ft)

Population (2025-01-01)
  - Total: 121
  - Density: 3.7/km^{2} (9.5/sq mi)
- Time zone: UTC+1 (CET)
  - Summer (DST): UTC+2 (CEST)
- Postal code: 09614
- Website: http://www.huertadearriba.es/

Huerta de Arriba (Spanish pronunciation: [wˈeɾta dˈe aɾɾˈiβa]) is a municipality and village located in the province of Burgos, autonomous community of Castile and León, Spain. It belongs to the comarca of Sierra de la Demanda and to the judicial district of Salas de los Infantes. According to the 2024 census, the municipality has a population of 128 inhabitants. The municipality covers an area of 33 km² (12.81 sq mi).

In the small bar by the fountain and trough, behind the door there is a stuffed two-headed calf.

== Toponymy ==
The toponym is a compound name, literally meaning "upper orchard", combining huerta, derived from Spanish huerto and ultimately from the Latin hortum ("garden, orchard"), with arriba, meaning "above" or "upper". The name distinguishes it from neighbouring Huerta de Abajo, literally meaning "lower orchard", with both settlements situated along the Tejero River, Huerta de Arriba lying upstream from Huerta de Abajo.
