= Tolbaños de Arriba =

- Village
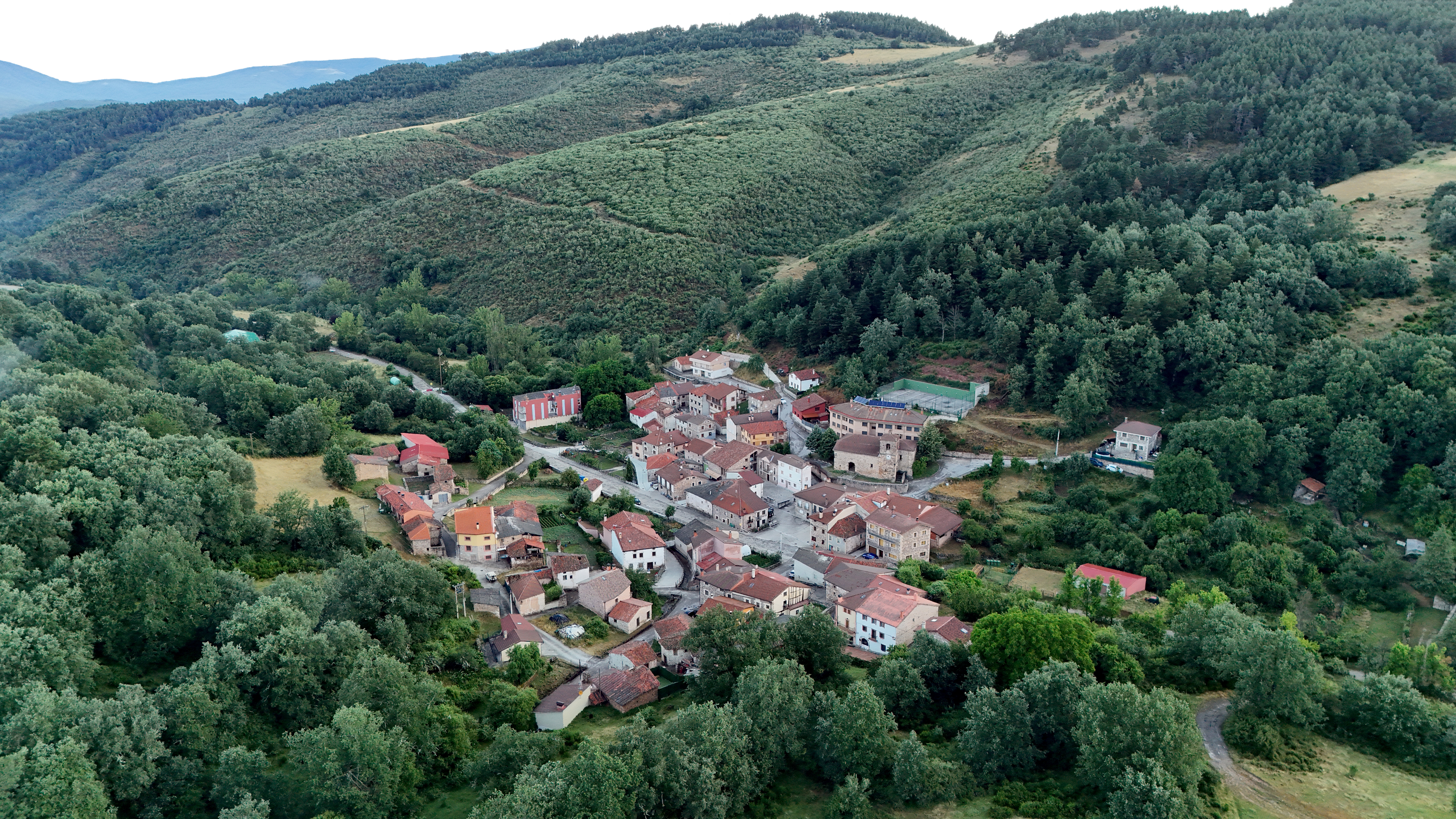
- Tolbaños de Arriba
- Interactive map of Tolbaños de Arriba
- Coordinates: 42°05′42″N 3°06′12″W
- Country: Spain
- Autonomous community: Castile and León
- Provinces of Spain: Burgos
- Judicial district: Salas de los Infantes
- Municipality: Valle de Valdelaguna
- Postal code: 09614

Tolbaños de Arriba is a Spanish village in the province of Burgos. Located at 1257 meters above sea level in the Sierra de la Demanda, it is the highest village in the province. Administratively it belongs to the municipality of Valle de Valdelaguna.

== Bibliography ==
- Boletín Oficial de la Provincia de Burgos, número 79 de 25 de abril de 2007
