= Hoyuelos de la Sierra =

Settlement in Castile and León, Spain

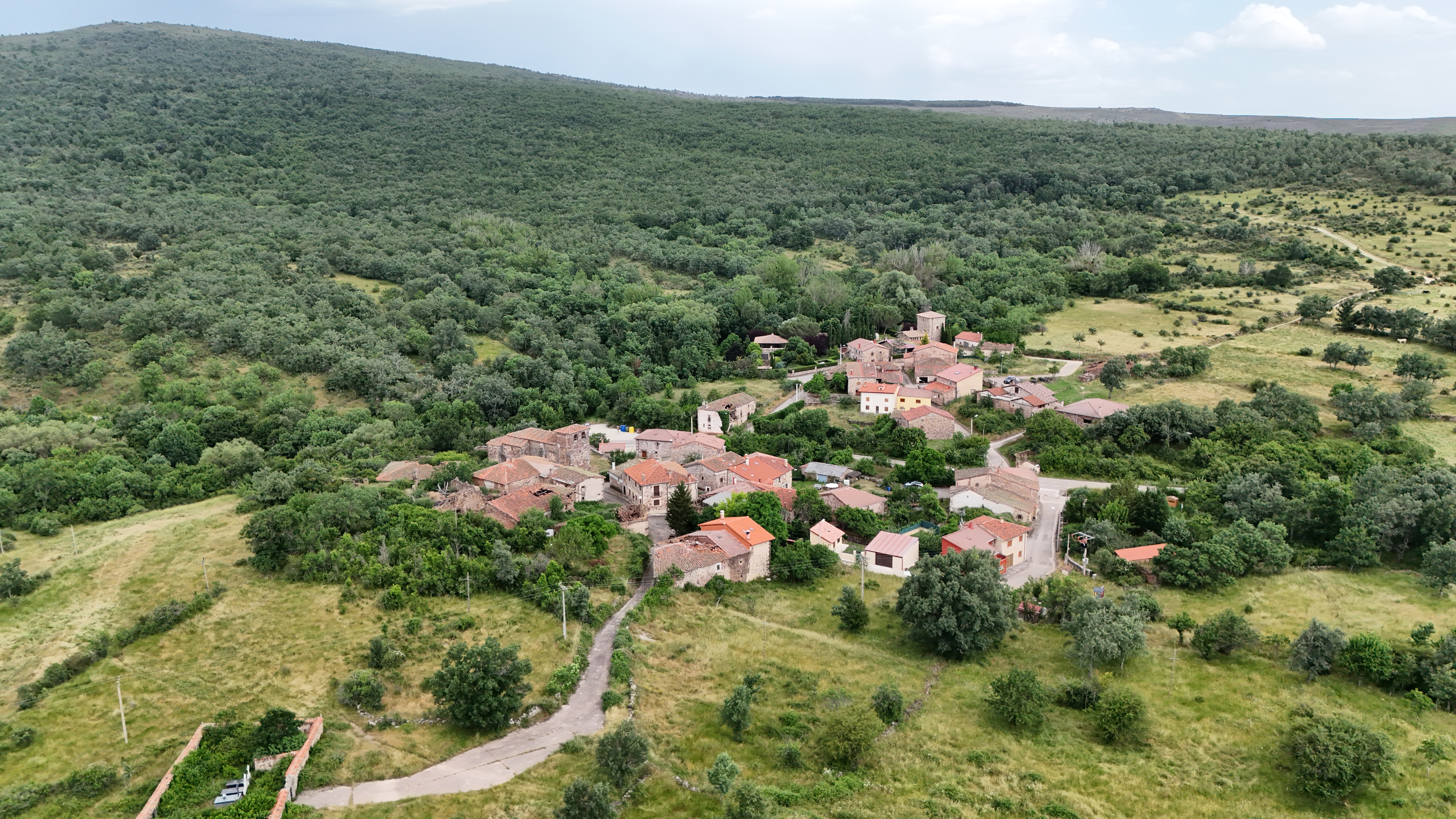
- View of Hoyuelos de la Sierra

- Location in Spain
- Coordinates: 42°05′20″N 3°15′28″W
- Country: Spain
- Autonomous community: Castile and León
- Province: Burgos
- Postal code: 090xx

Hoyuelos de la Sierra is a settlement in Burgos, Castilla y León (Spain), within the municipality of Salas de los Infantes.
