= Arroyo de Salas =

Town in Burgos Province, Castile and León, Spain

Coordinates: 42°04′N 3°16′W

Arroyo de Salas is a town in the province of Burgos, Spain. It is part of the municipality of Salas de los Infantes.
