= Nuestra Señora de la Vega =

- Town
- Location in Spain
- Coordinates: 42.59788°N 2.851181°W
- Country: Spain
- Autonomous community: Castile and León
- Province: Burgos
- Postal code: 0947

Nuestra Señora de la Vega is a town in the province of Burgos, Autonomous community of Castilla y León (Spain), region of Sierra de la Demanda, judicial district of Salas de los Infantes, Valdelaguna Valley City Council. The town is situated on the border of the dioceses of Santander and Burgos.
