= Salas de los Infantes =

- Municipality and city
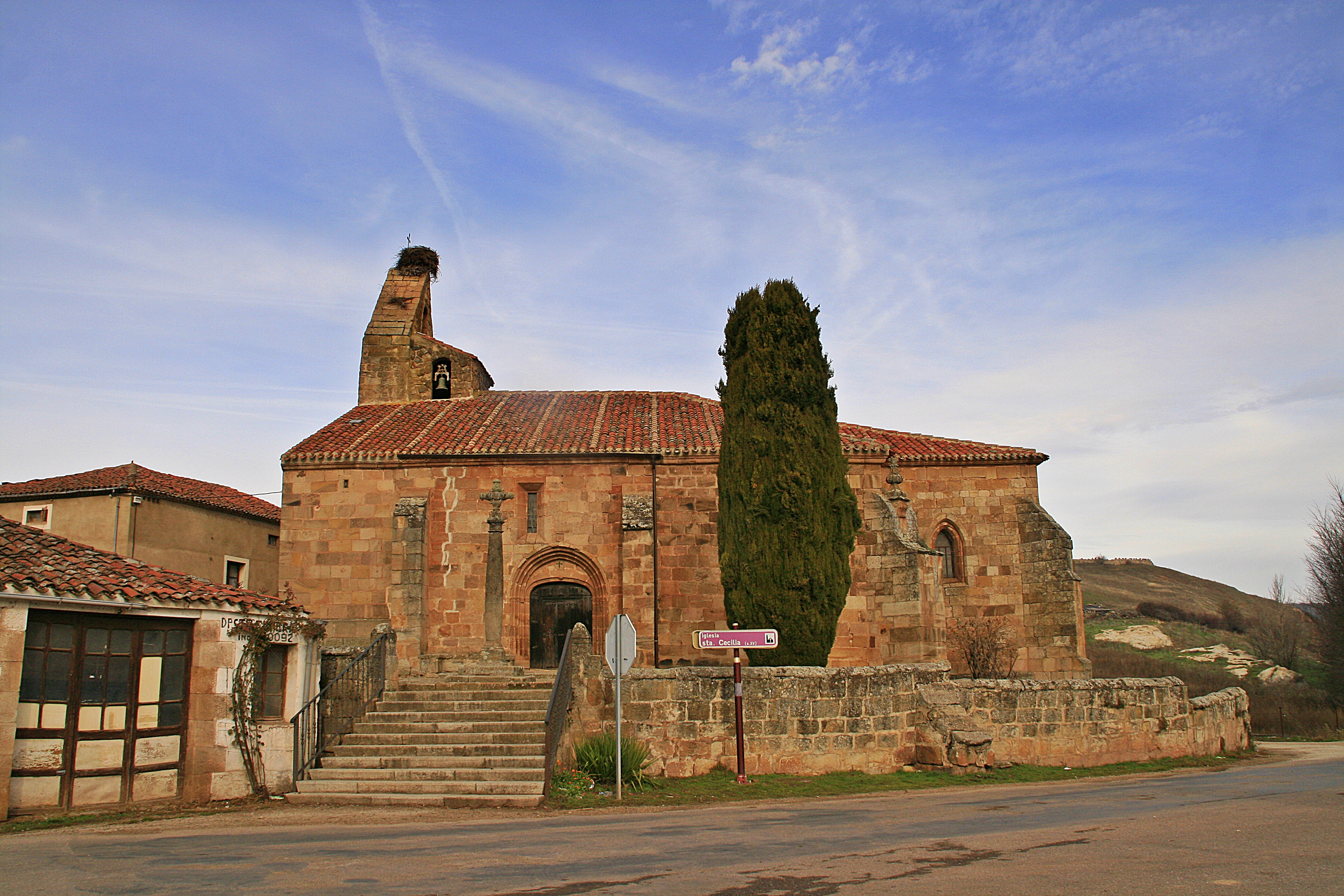
- Santa Cecilia church (15th century)

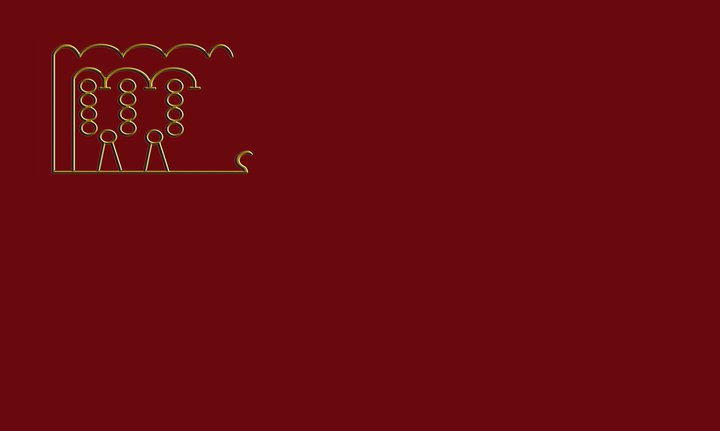
- Flag Coat of arms

- Location Salas de los Infantes (Spain)
- Coordinates: 42°01′23″N 3°16′53″W
- Country: Spain
- Autonomous community: Castile and León
- Comarca: Sierra de la Demanda
- Municipality: Salas de los Infantes

Government
  - Mayor: Marta Arroyo (PP)

Area
  - Total: 31.319 km^{2} (12.092 sq mi)
  - Land: 31 km^{2} (12 sq mi)
  - Water: 0.00 km^{2} (0 sq mi)
- Elevation: 964 m (3,163 ft)

Population (2025-01-01)
  - Total: 1,959
- Time zone: UTC+1 (CET)
  - Summer (DST): UTC+2 (CEST)
- Postal code: 09600
- Website: http://www.salasdelosinfantes.net/

Salas de los Infantes is a municipality and city in Burgos province between La Rioja, Soria and Burgos city in Spain. It is hilly with many foothills and mountains. The mountain range Sierra de la Demanda with the black lagoon, La Laguna Negra, is nearby.

== People from Salas de los Infantes ==
- Manuel Quintano Bonifaz (1699–1774) - Cleric and Grand Inquisitor of Spain from 1755 to 1774.

== See also ==
- Arroyo de Salas
- Hoyuelos de la Sierra
- Nuestra Señora de la Vega
