= San Antón, La Rioja =

San Antón
- Populated place
- Location within La Rioja, Spain Location within Spain
- Country: Spain
- Autonomous community: La Rioja
- Comarca: Ezcaray

Population
  - Total: 5
- Postal code: 26280

San Antón is a village in La Rioja (Spain), near Ezcaray. It is located on the left bank of the Oja River almost opposite to Azárrulla. The Regaldía stream runs through the village.

In the past there was an iron ore mine, one of the most important in the area.

In 1995, the installation of public lighting began.

Currently many of its houses are being restored, mainly for holiday use.

== Monuments ==
Its church, dedicated to San Antonio, was begun in the mid-sixteenth century, although the vaults are the work of the eighteenth century. It is made of masonry and ashlar. It is currently still standing thanks to the collaboration of the neighbors who currently live mostly outside the municipality, although they are originally from a large part of this village.
