= Turza, La Rioja =

Turza
- Populated place
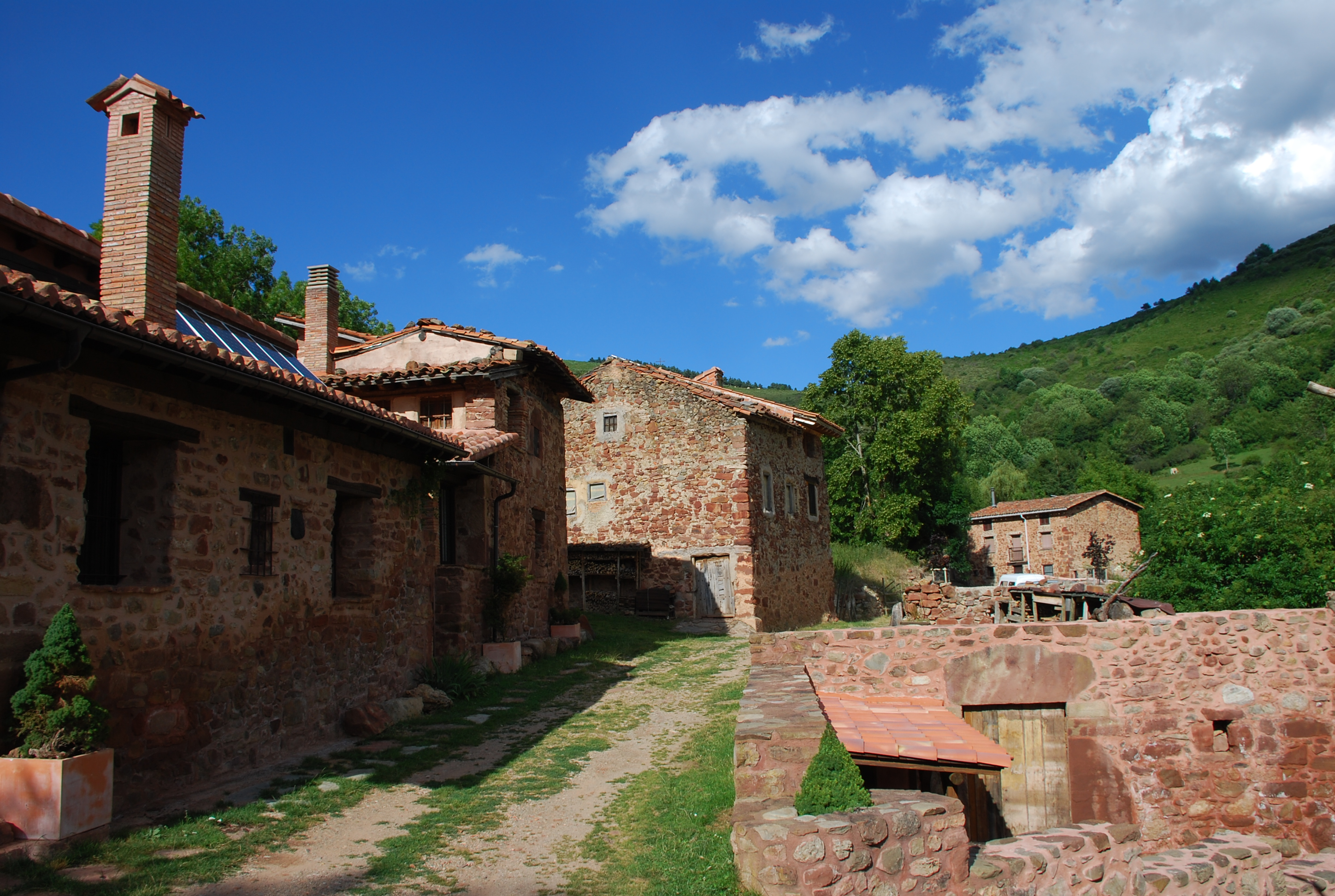
- Street of Turza.

- Location within La Rioja, Spain Location within Spain
- Country: Spain
- Autonomous community: La Rioja
- Comarca: Ezcaray

Population
  - Total: 5
- Postal code: 26280

Turza is a village in the municipality of Ezcaray, in the province and autonomous community of La Rioja, Spain. As of 2018 had a population of 5 people.
