= Ojacastro =

- Municipality
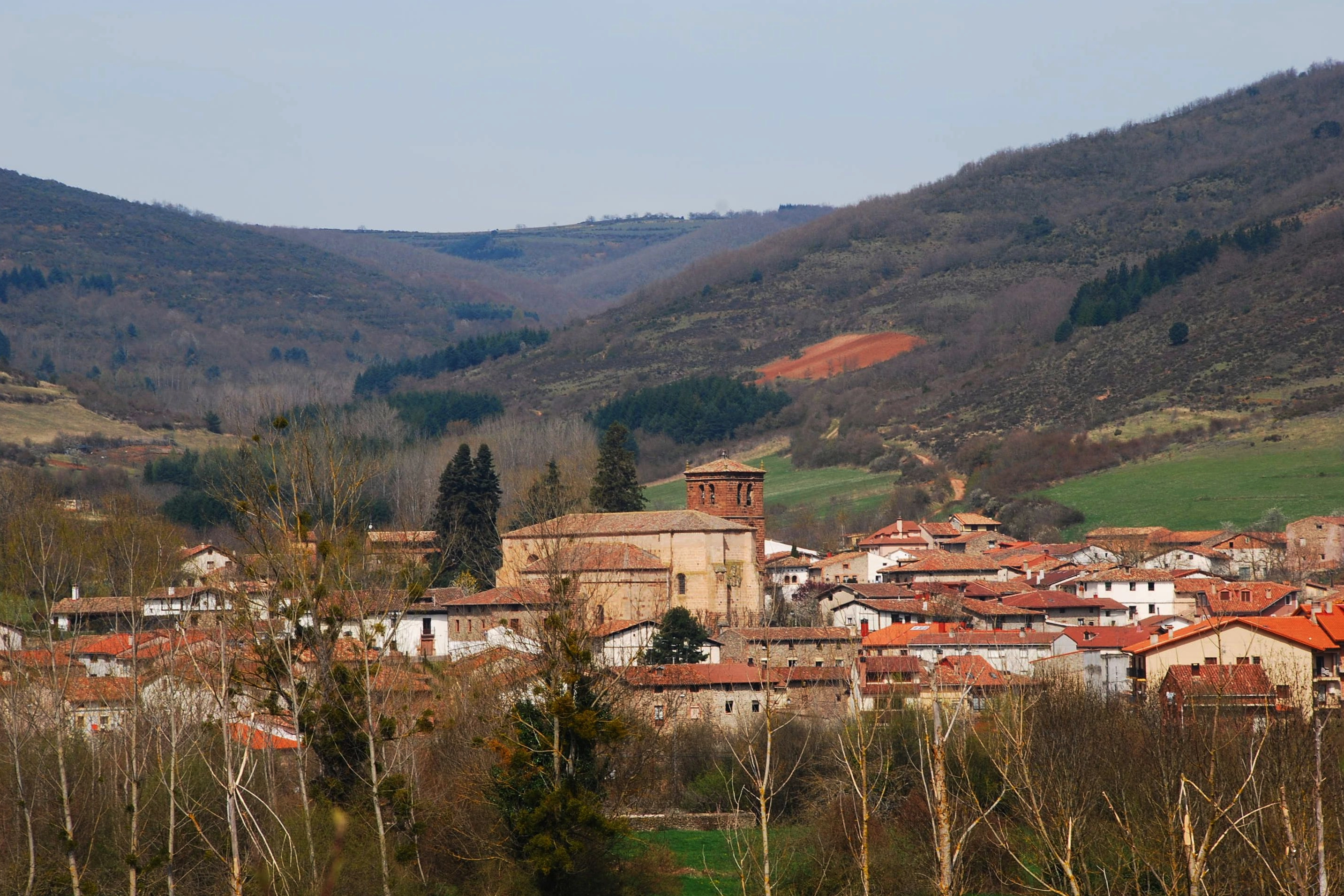
- Skyline of Ojacastro

- Coat of arms

- Location within La Rioja, Spain Location within Spain
- Coordinates: 42°20′47″N 3°00′18″W
- Country: Spain
- Autonomous community: La Rioja
- Comarca: Ezcaray

Government
  - Mayor: Luis Domingo Ollero (PP)

Area
  - Total: 44.32 km^{2} (17.11 sq mi)
- Elevation: 793 m (2,602 ft)

Population (2025-01-01)
  - Total: 199
- Demonym: ojacastrense
- Postal code: 26270
- Website: www.ojacastro.org

Ojacastro is a village in the province and autonomous community of La Rioja, Spain. The municipality covers an area of 44.32 square kilometres (17.11 sq mi) and as of 2011 had a population of 198 people.

== Demographics ==
=== Population centres ===
- Ojacastro
- Amunartia
- Arviza
- Escarza
- Espidia
- Larrea
- Masoa
- Matalturra
- San Asensio de los Cantos
- Tondeluna
- Ulizarna
- Uyarra
- Zabárrula

== Notable people ==
- José Juan Bautista Merino Urrutia, historian.
