= Arviza =

- Populated place
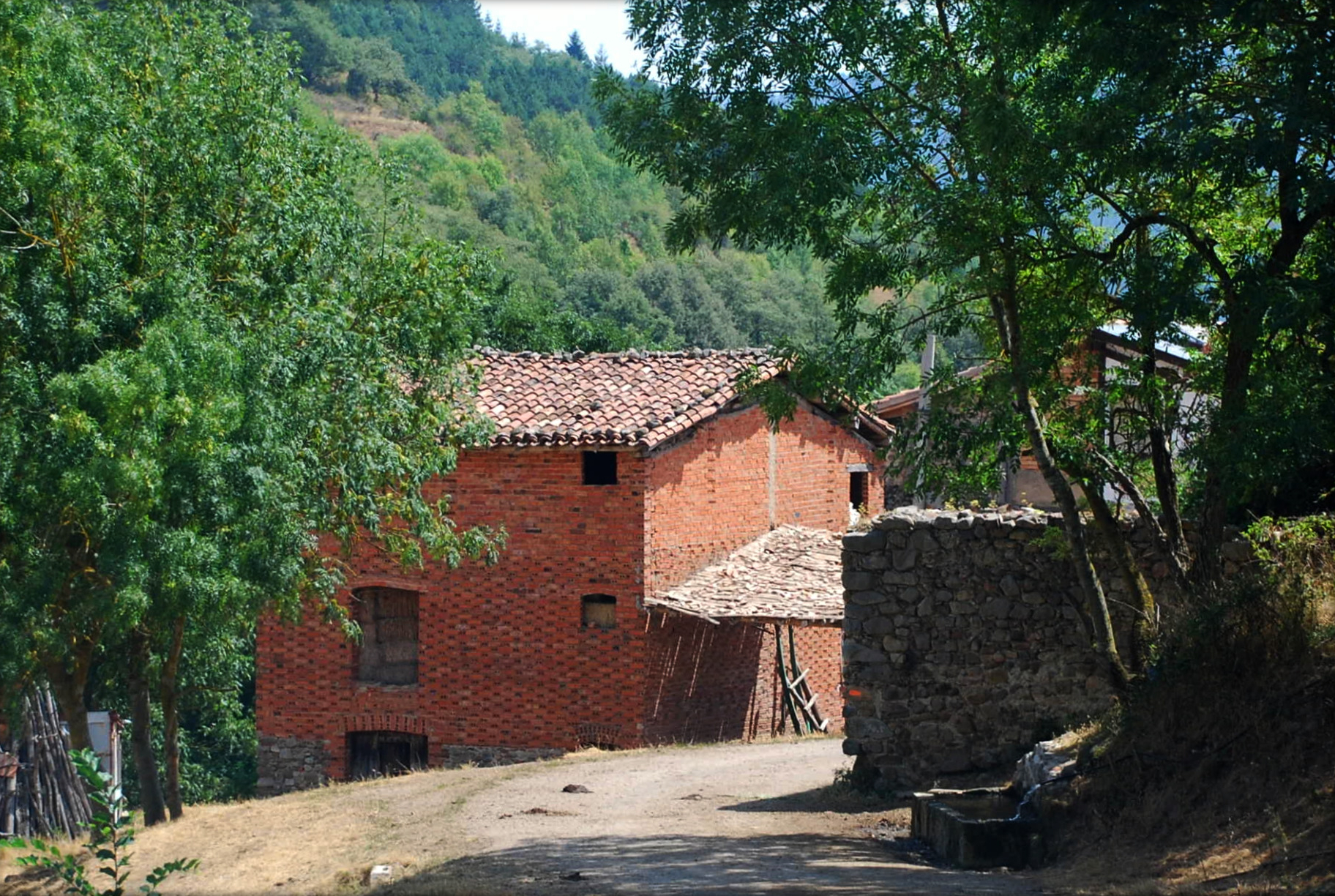
- View of Arviza

- Location within La Rioja, Spain Location within Spain
- Country: Spain
- Autonomous community: La Rioja
- Comarca: Ezcaray

Population
  - Total: 3
- Postal code: 26270

Arviza is a village in the municipality of Ojacastro, in the province and autonomous community of La Rioja, Spain. As of 2018 it had a population of 3 people.
