= San Asensio de los Cantos =

- Populated place
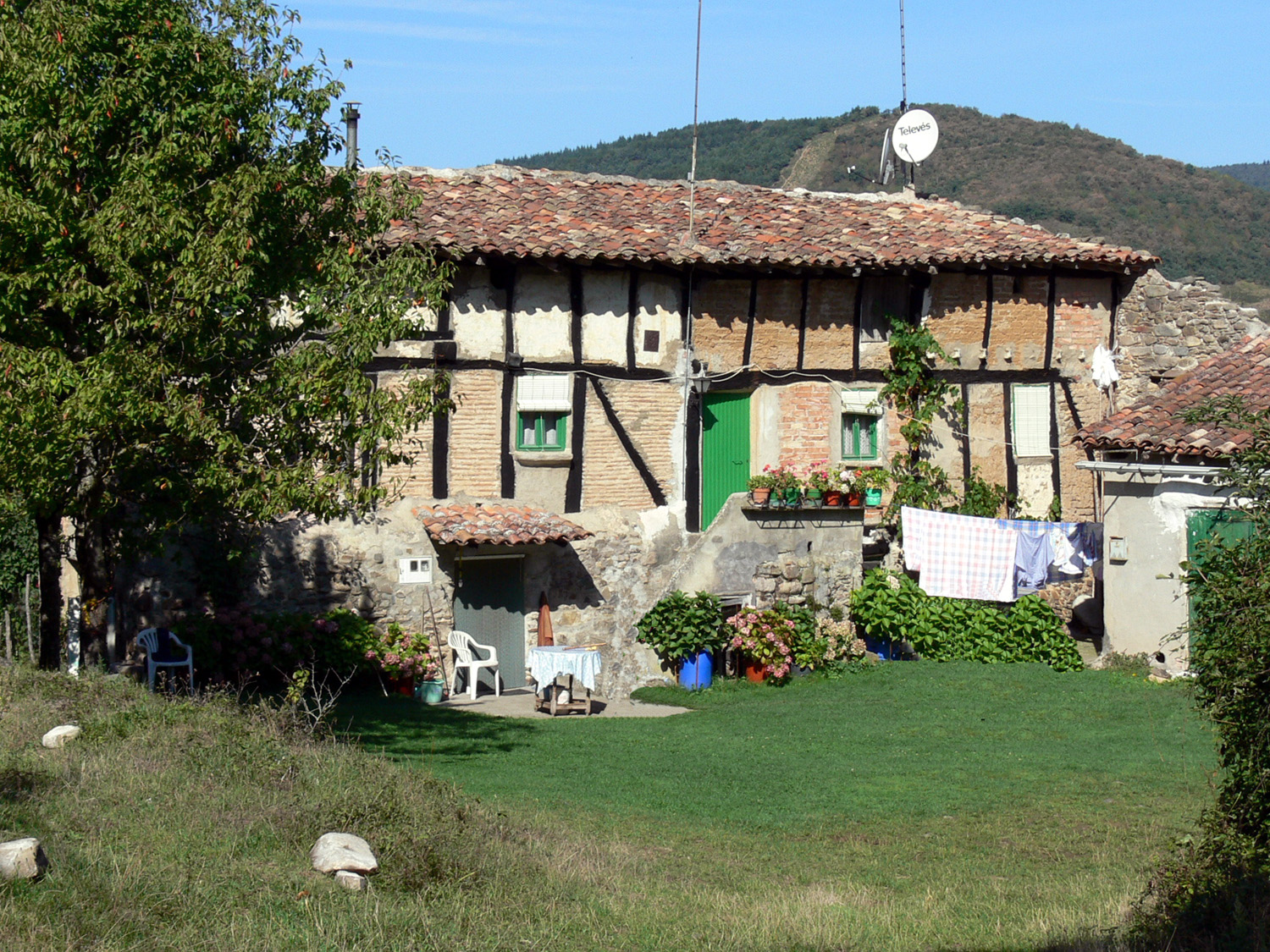
- View of San Asensio de los Cantos

- Location within La Rioja, Spain Location within Spain
- Country: Spain
- Autonomous community: La Rioja
- Comarca: Ezcaray

Population
  - Total: 1
- Postal code: 26270

San Asensio de los Cantos is a village in the municipality of Ojacastro, in the province and autonomous community of La Rioja, Spain. As of 2018, it had a population of 1 person.
