= Urdanta =

- Populated place
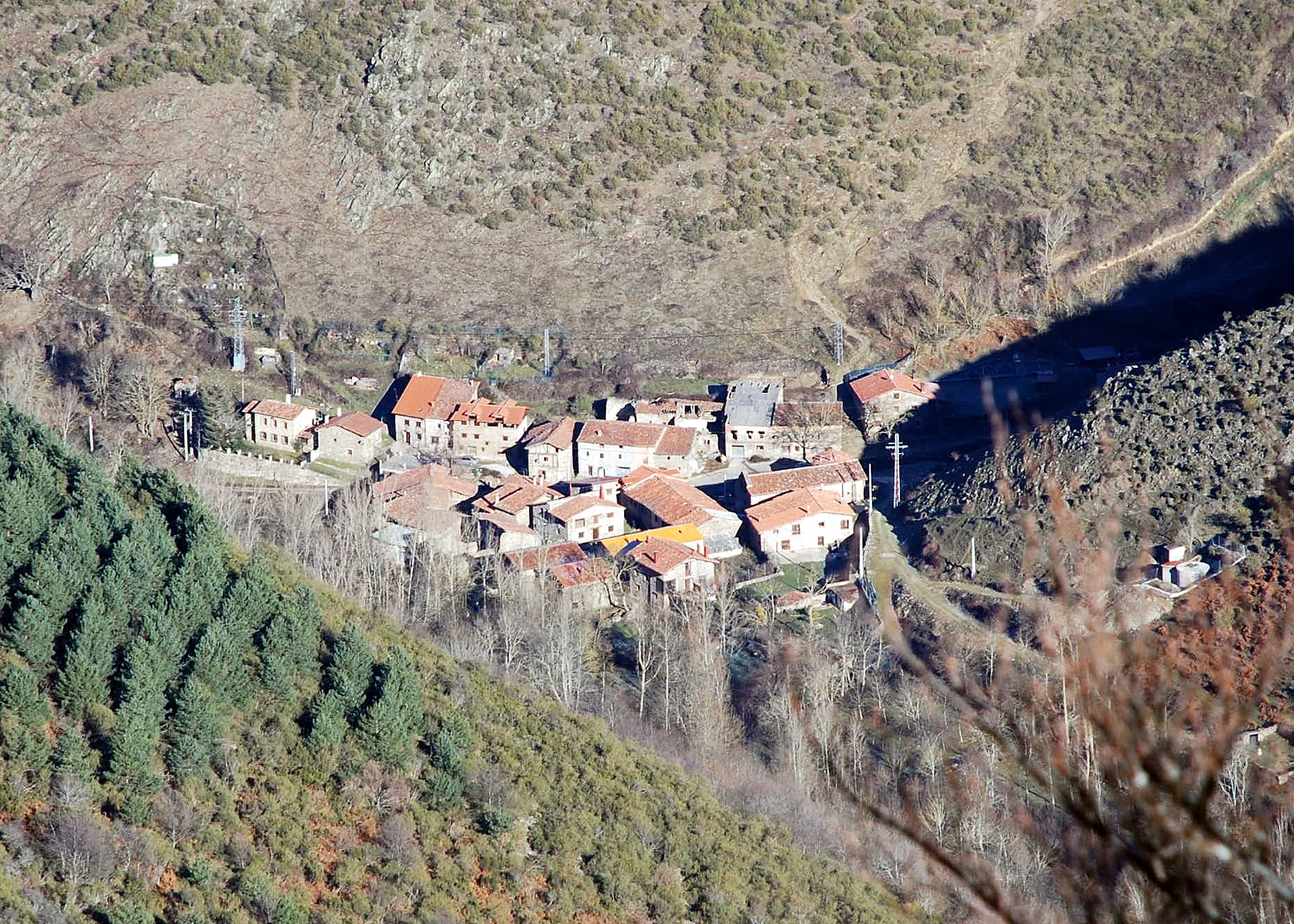
- View of Urdanta

- Location within La Rioja, Spain Location within Spain
- Country: Spain
- Autonomous community: La Rioja
- Comarca: Ezcaray

Population
  - Total: 19
- Postal code: 26280

Urdanta is a village in the municipality of Ezcaray, in the province and autonomous community of La Rioja, Spain. As of 2019 had a population of 19 people.
