= Ezcaray =

- Municipality
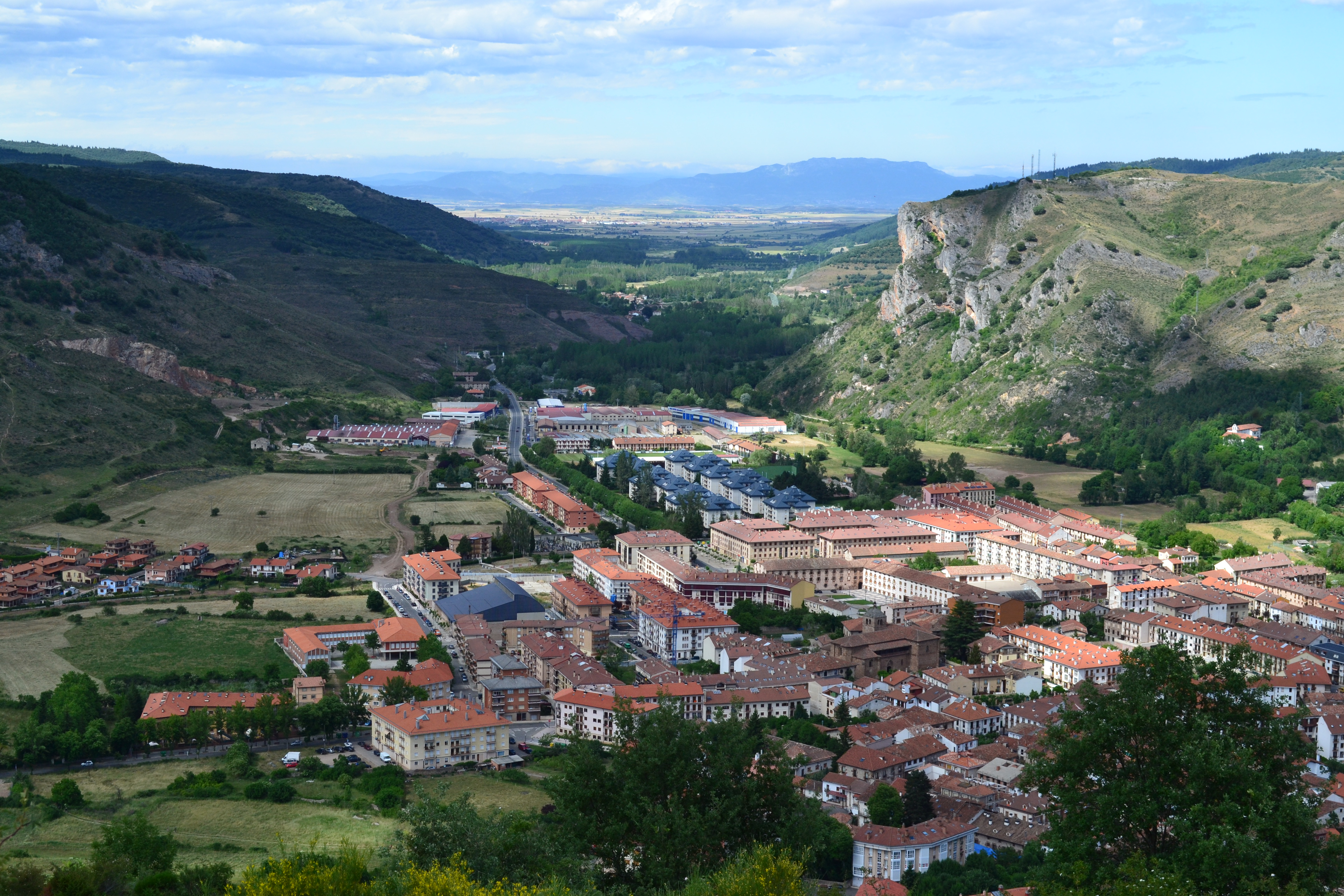
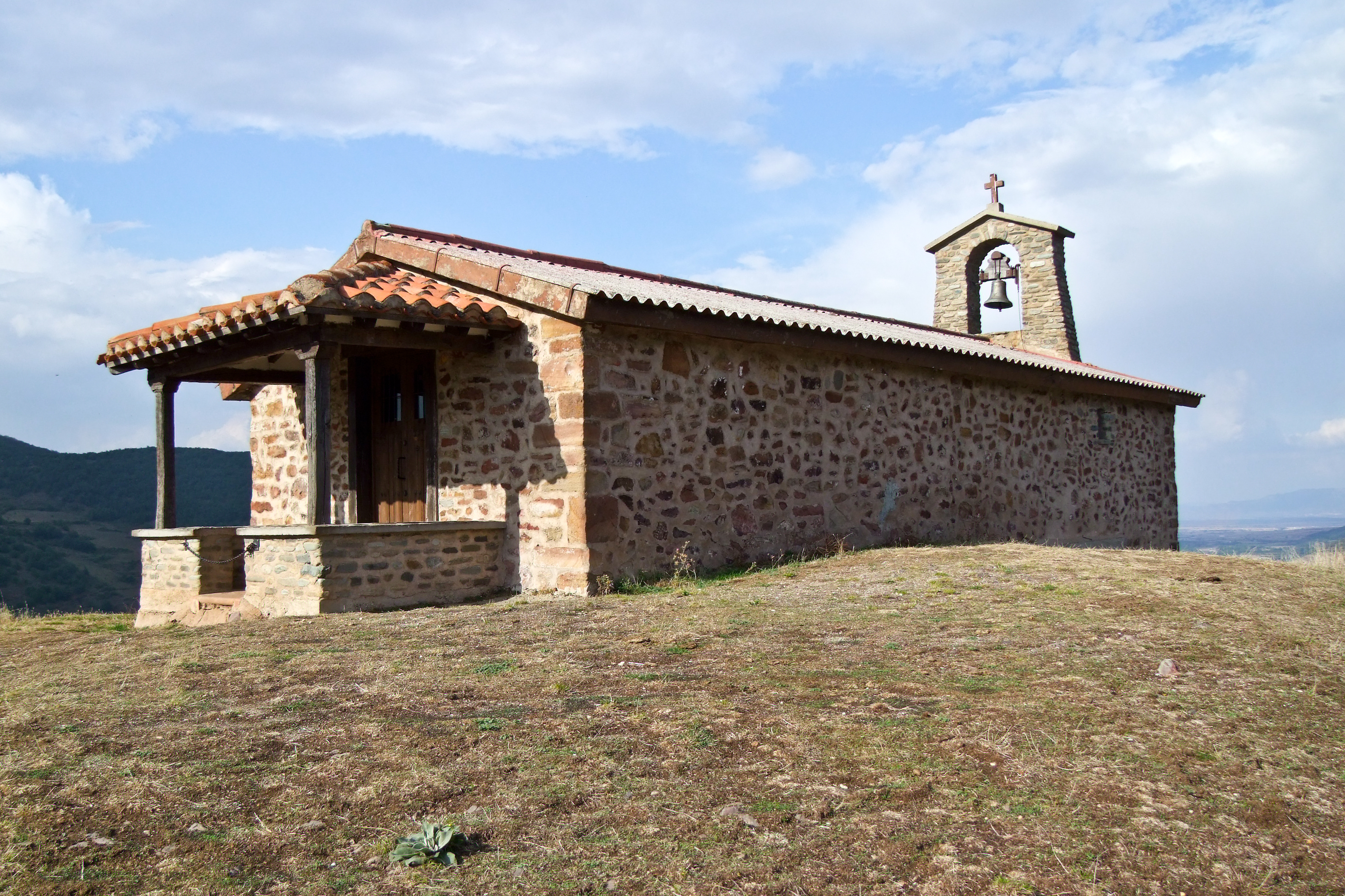
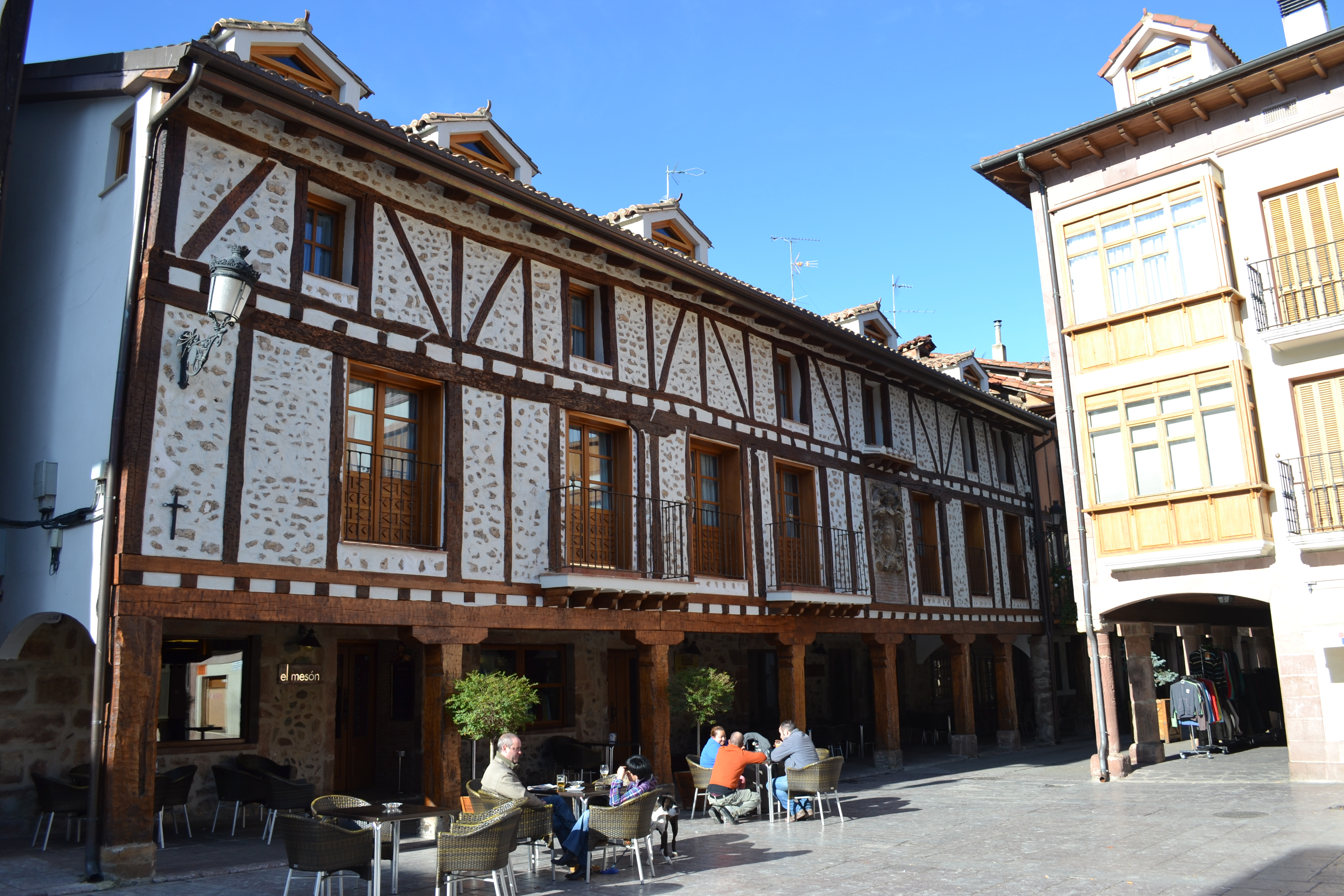
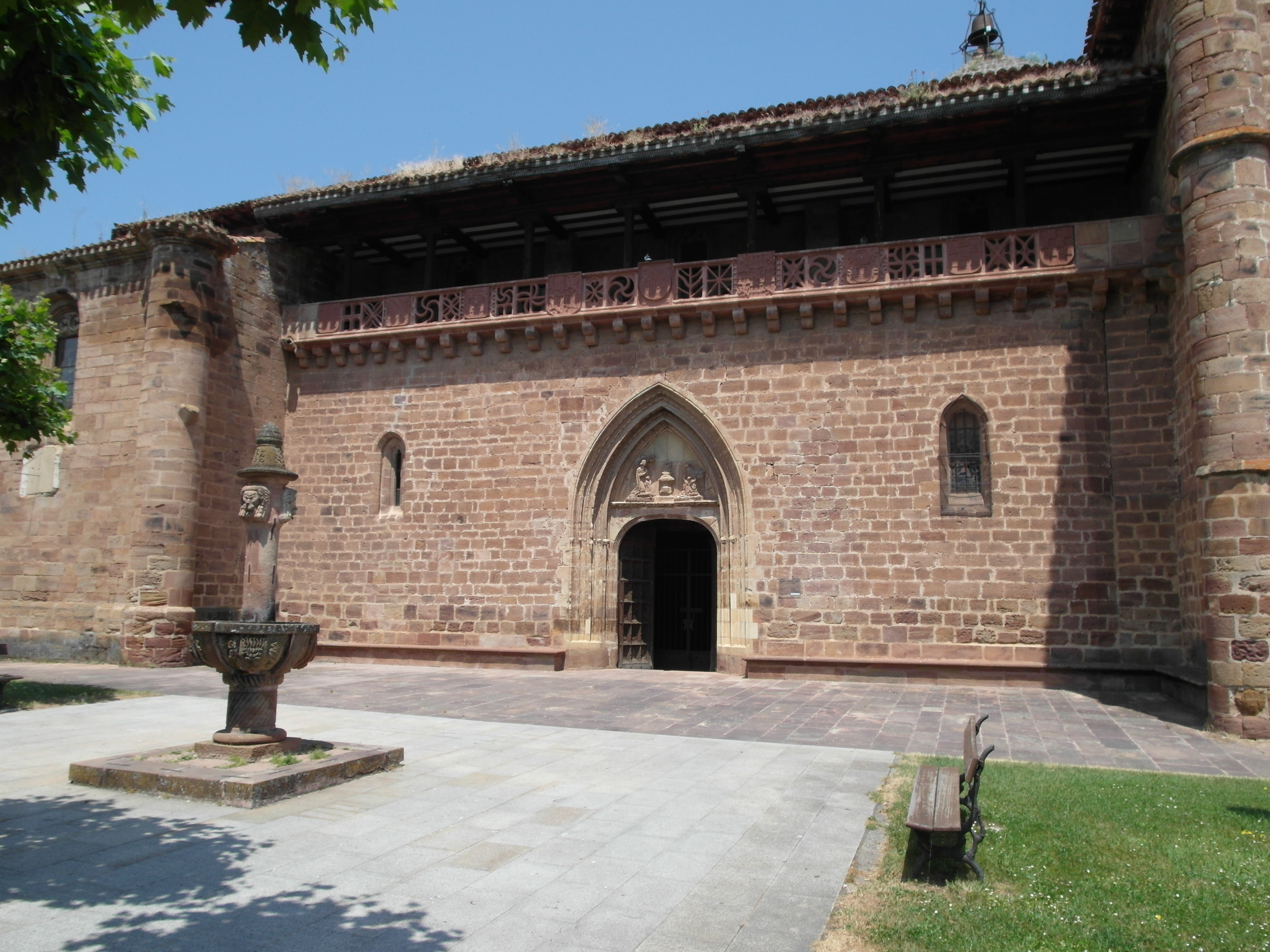
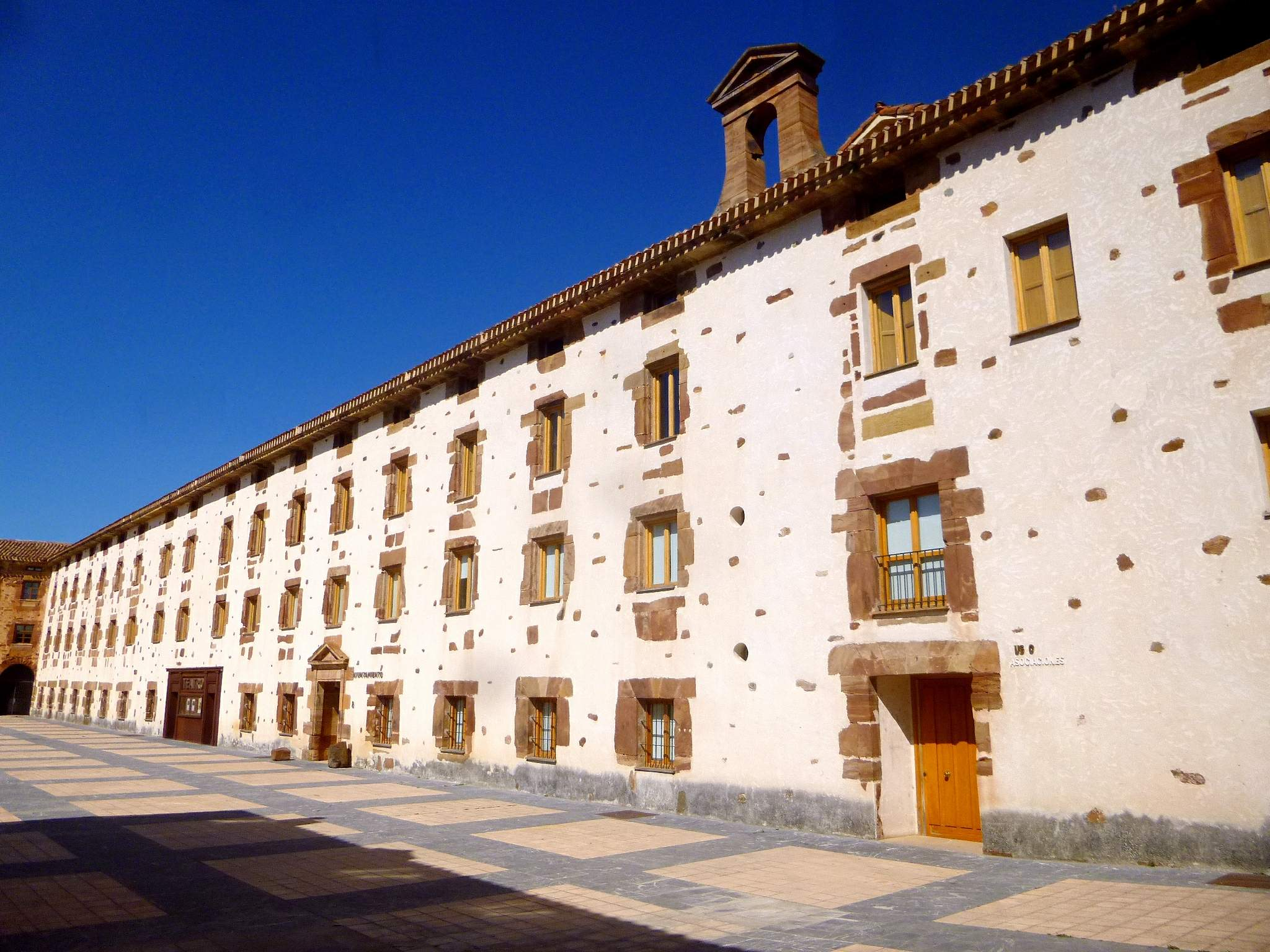
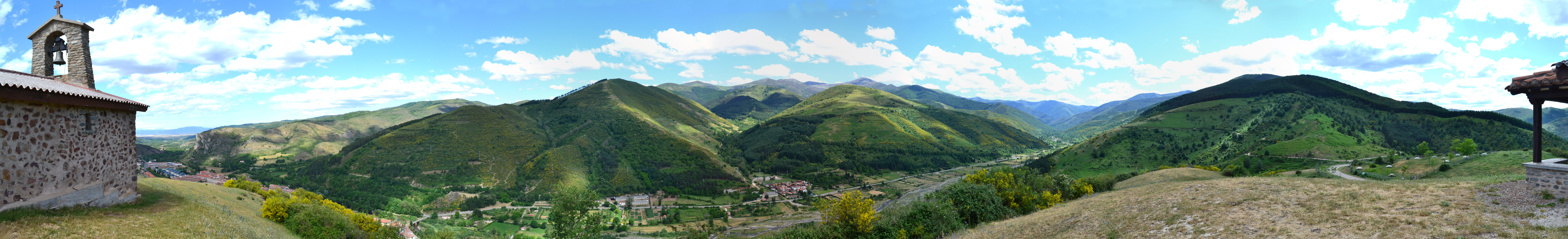

- Coat of arms

- Location in La Rioja Location in Spain
- Coordinates: 42°19′36″N 3°00′48″W
- Country: Spain
- Autonomous community: La Rioja
- Province: La Rioja

Area
  - Total: 14.69 km^{2} (5.67 sq mi)

Population (2025-01-01)
  - Total: 2,067
  - Density: 140.7/km^{2} (364.4/sq mi)
- Time zone: UTC+1 (CET)
  - Summer (DST): UTC+2 (CEST)
- Postal code: 26280
- Official language: Spanish
- Website: Official website

Ezcaray is a town and municipality in the Oja Valley in the La Rioja region of northern Spain.

The name is of Basque origin, from haitz-garai. (h)aitz means 'rock' and garai means 'high'. This name, Peña Alta (High Rock), possibly refers to the San Torcuato rock, below which the town is located.

The town is situated at the base of the San Lorenzo peak and is 13 kilometres (8.1 mi) from the Valdezcaray ski area.

== Demographics ==
=== Population centres ===
- Ezcaray
- Altuzarra
- Ayabarrena
- Azárrulla
- Cilbarrena
- Posadas
- San Antón
- Turza
- Urdanta
- Zaldierna
- Turza

== Politics ==
List of mayors since the democratic elections of 1979
Term	Mayor	Political party
1979–1983	José Antonio Cornejo Vitoria	PSOE
1983–1987		AP
1987–1991	Manuel Ángel Vilches Martín	PSOE
1991–1995	Rodolfo Valgañón Mateo	PR
1995–1999	Fernando Sanz Úbeda	PP
1999–2003	Fernando Sanz Úbeda	PP
2003–2007	Jesús Garrido Arrea/ Juan Carlos Sáez Gómez	PSOE/PP
2007–2011	Jesús Garrido Arrea	PSOE
2011–2015	Diego Bengoa de la Cruz	PP
2015–2019	Diego Bengoa de la Cruz	PP
2019–2023	Gonzalo Abajo Monge	PSOE
2023–	n/d	n/d

== Places of interest ==
- Church of Santa María la Mayor
- Royal Cloth Factory of Ezcaray
- Hermitage of the Virgin of Allende
- Hermitage of Saint Barbara
- Palace of Barroeta
- Calvary of Saint Lazarus
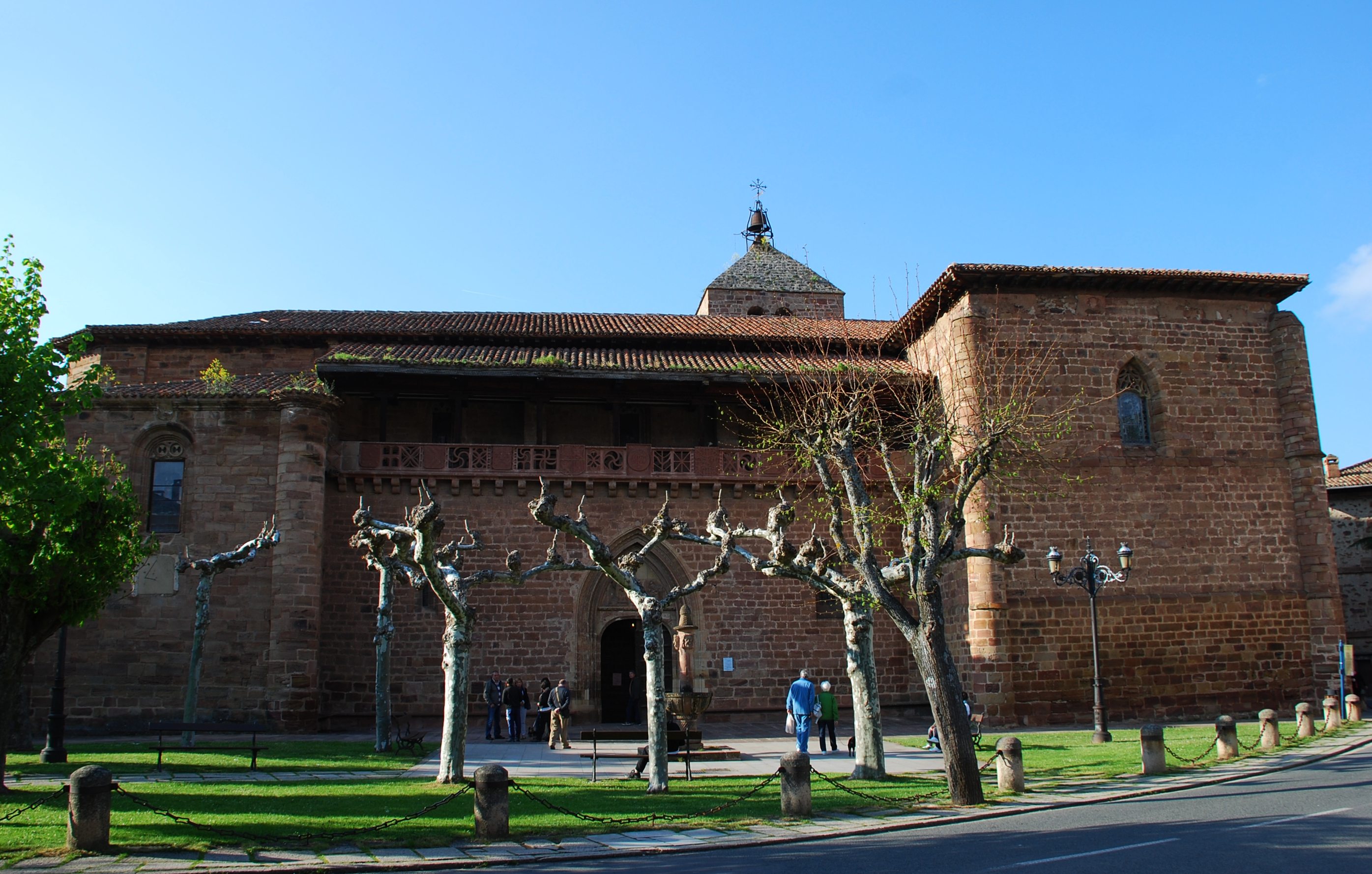
Church of Santa María la Mayor.

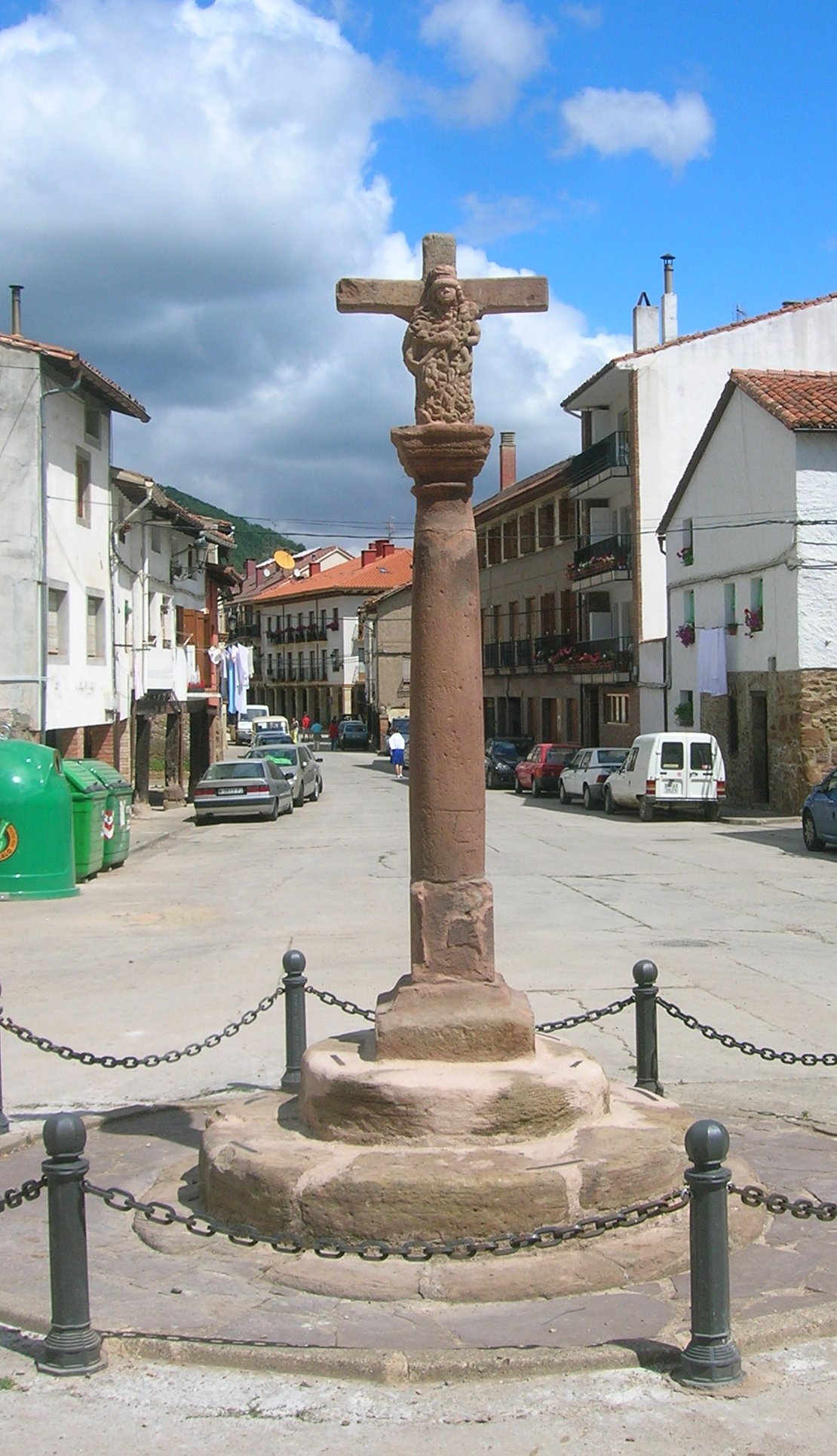
Calvary of Saint Lazarus.

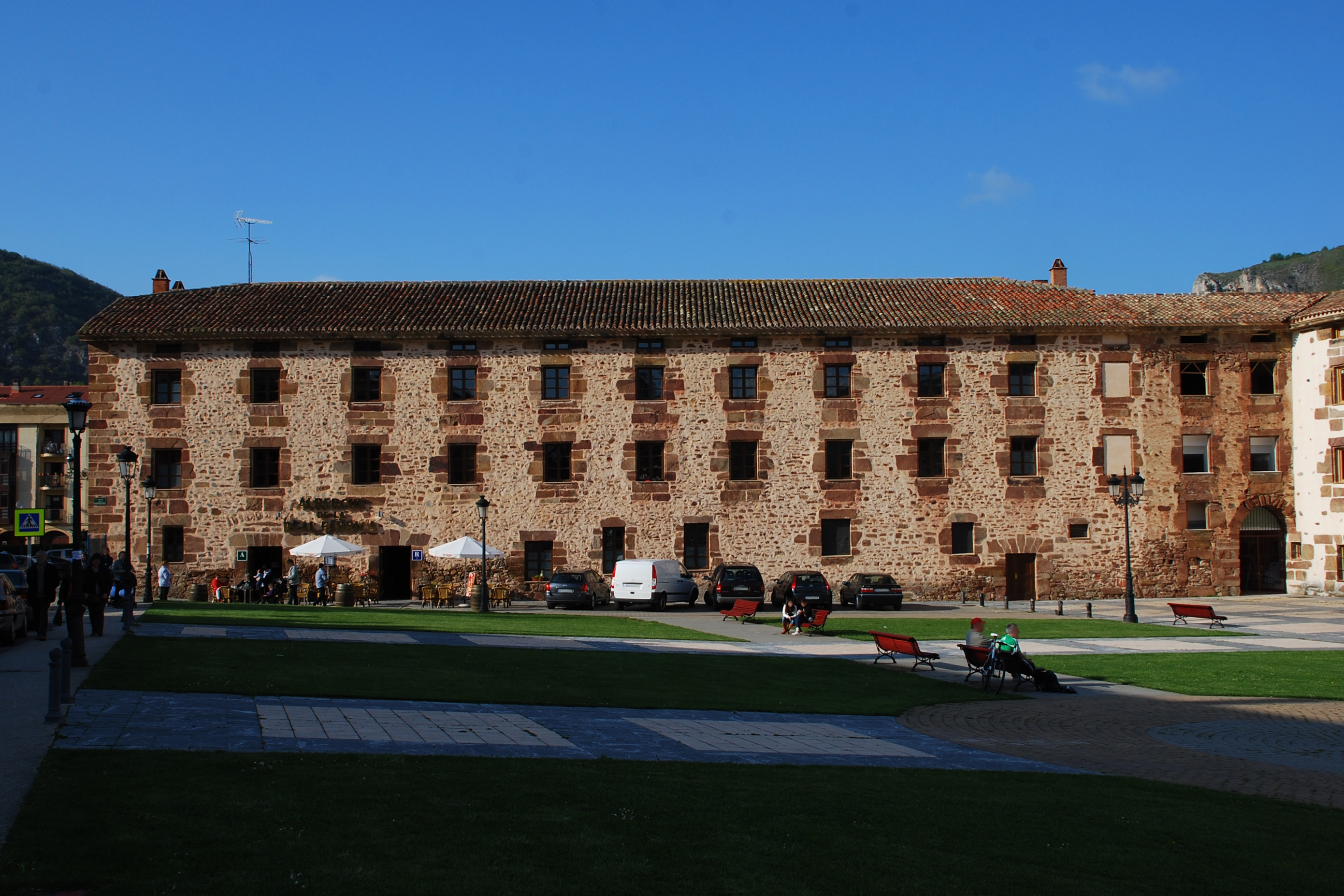
Royal Cloth Factory of Ezcaray.

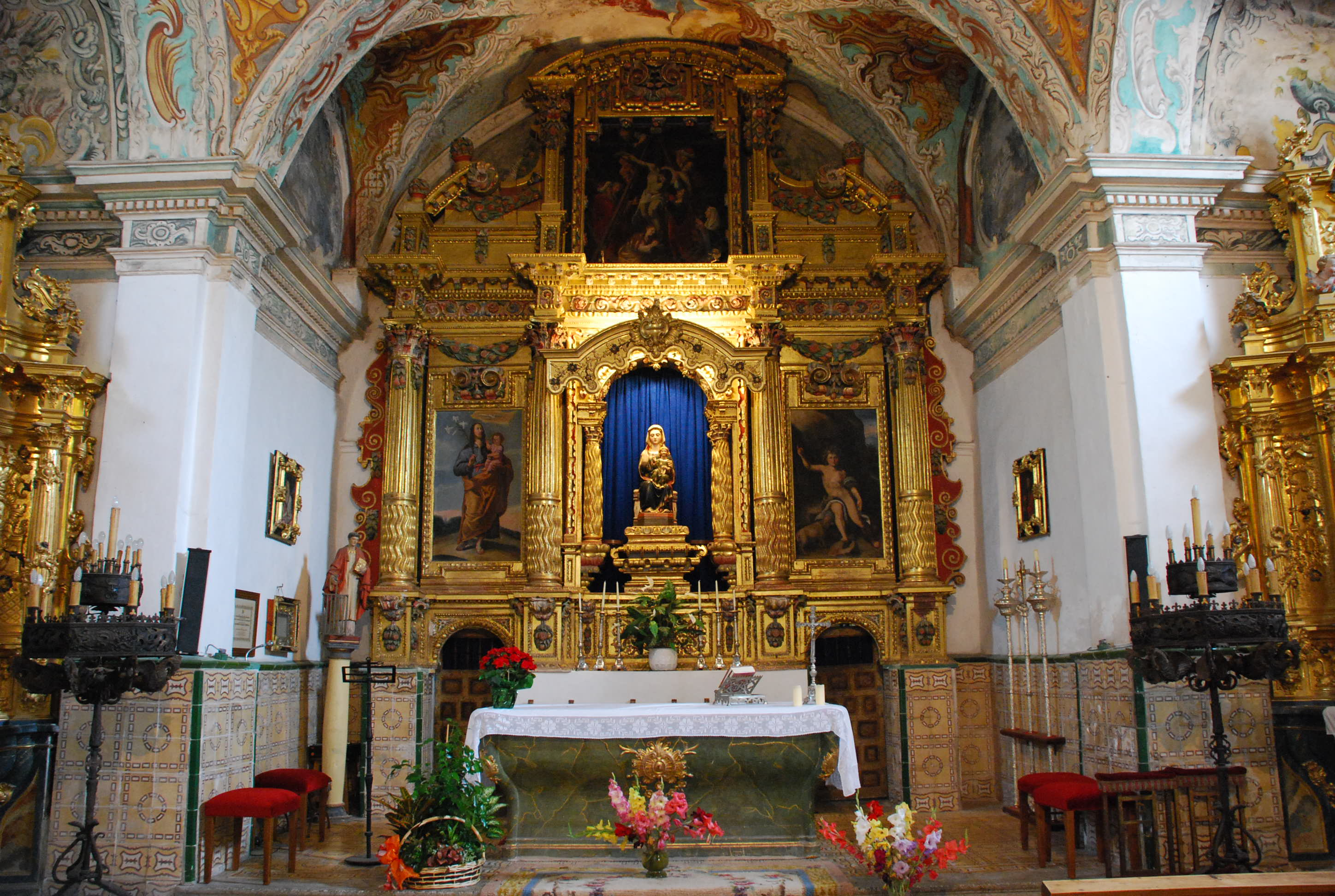
Reredos of Hermitage of the Virgin of Allende.

== Notable people ==
- Armando Buscarini, poet
- Francisco Antonio Barbadillo Vitoria
- Pedro Antonio Barroeta y Ángel, archbishop of Lima
- Santiago Lope Gonzalo, musician and composer
- Andrés de la Calleja, painter
- Carlos Perujo
- Jaime Nava

== See also ==
- Olmos y Robles
