= Comarca de Ezcaray =

Ezcaray
- Comarca
- Interactive map of Ezcaray
- Country: Spain

Ezcaray is a comarca in La Rioja province in Spain.
