= Etymology of La Rioja =

Origins of the toponym of the regions with this name

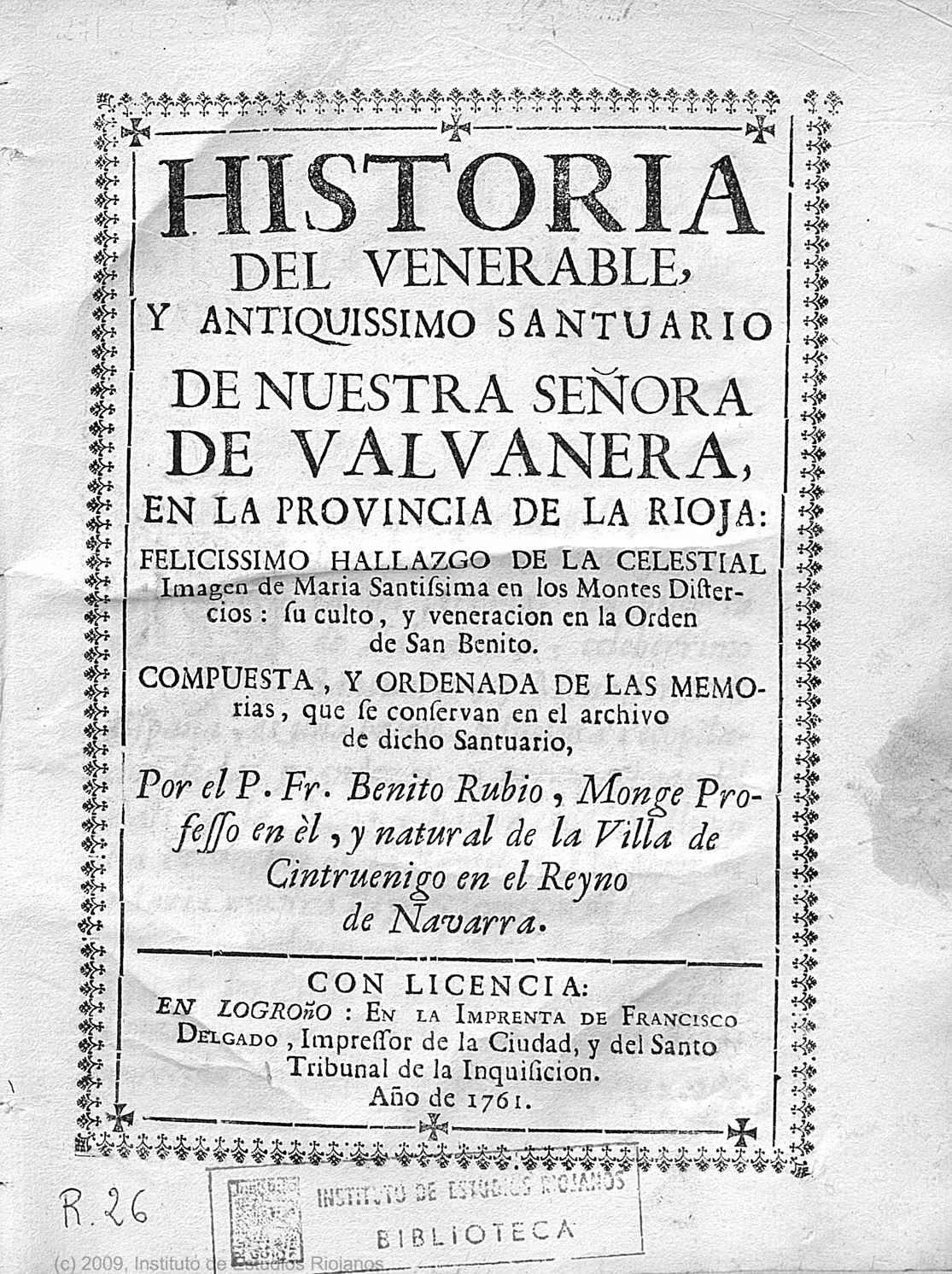
Cover of the 1761 book entitled Historia del venerable, y antiquissimo Santuario de Nuestra Señora de Valvanera, in the province of La Rioja, by Benito Rubio.

The etymology of the toponym Rioja, which is named after the autonomous community of La Rioja (Spain) and which inherited lands populated by people from La Rioja in the past, such as the province of La Rioja and its capital in Argentina, a town in Chile, another in the province of Almería (Spain), and the province of Rioja and its capital in Peru, is complex and has been much discussed. The main theories point to different origins: the traditional popular one that makes it correspond to the river Oja, the one that points to the term Rivalia that would be translated as "land of streams", the one that points as germ a nominal tautology in the term rivo Ohia that would mean "river of fluvial bed"; and the very diverse ones that indicate that it would have its origins in the Basque language, for example as union of the words herria and ogia being translated as "land of bread".

Numerous authors from different periods have proposed different theories about it, such as the friar Mateo Anguiano in the 18th century, Ángel Casimiro de Govantes in the 19th century, Menéndez Pidal or Merino Urrutia in the 20th century, or in the 21st century, the researcher Eduardo Aznar Martínez. In addition, there are texts by older authors such as Florián de Ocampo in the 16th century or Rodrigo Méndez Silva in the 17th century, which give an account of the popular etymology of the toponym.

The first written appearances of this toponym as Rioga or Riogam date back to the 11th century, and it can also be found with different spellings such as Rioxa, Riogia, Rivo de Oia, Rivogio or in its definitive form Rioja in texts of later centuries. On the other hand, the oldest document found in which its demonym appears dates from the 13th century, with the spellings riogeñ and riogensi, that is, Riojan (Spanish: riojano).

In the first written appearances of this toponym in the 11th century, the westernmost area of the present-day Spanish region is designated under the same name; therefore, the primitive Rioja was the territory around the basins of the rivers Tirón and Oja, with some divergences in its exact location by different authors. Gradually and as a result of various historical events, the toponym was extended from the Middle Ages, to name a larger region, consisting of seven river valleys, located between the Tirón in the west and the Alhama in the east, which flow into the Ebro, namely La Rioja today.

== Geographical location of its origins and process of expansion of the name ==
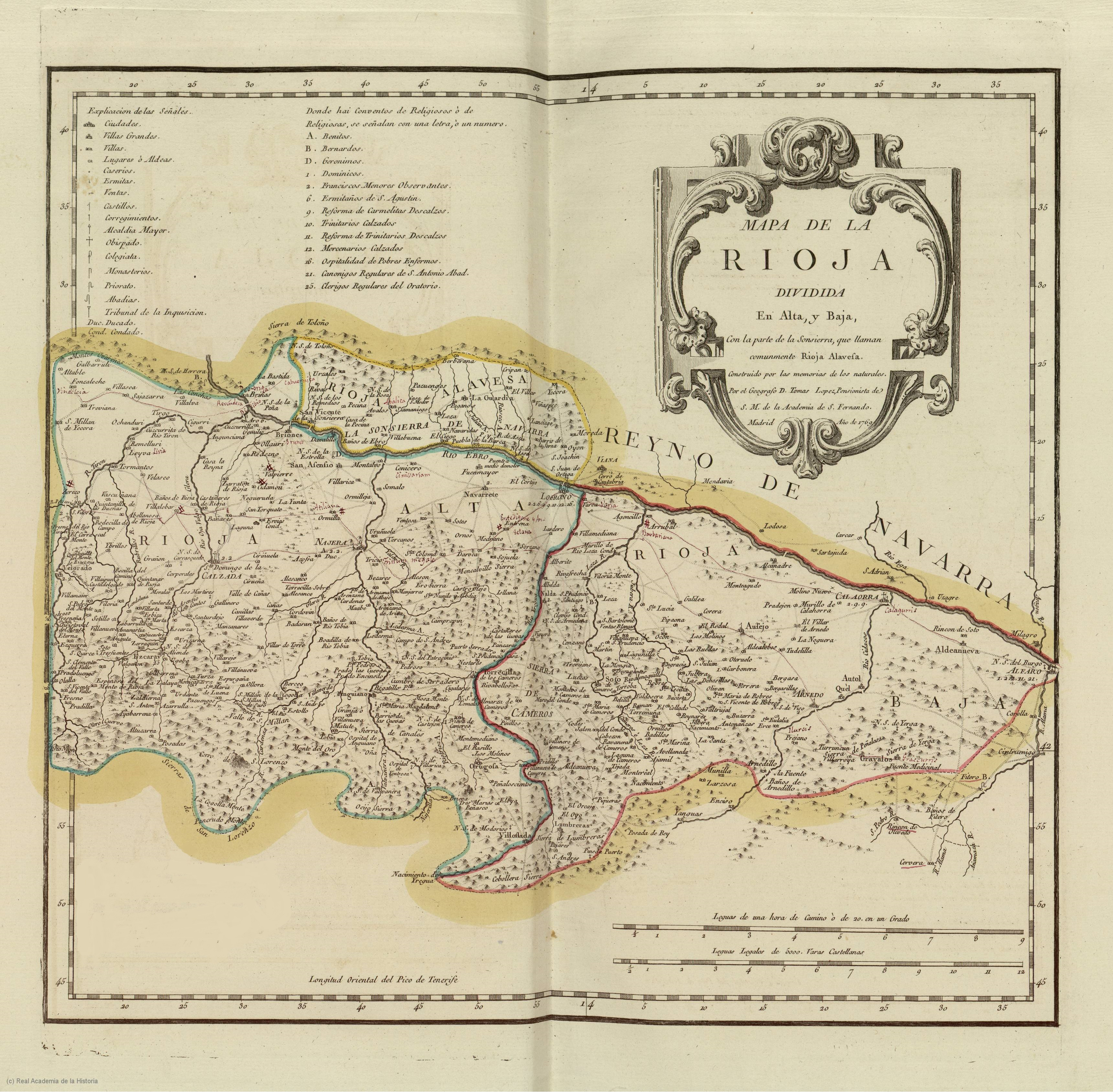
Map of La Rioja divided into Upper and Lower Rioja (Spanish: La Alta y Baja Rioja), drawn up by Tomás López in 1769. The dividing line between the two riojas is located at the Iregua River. The canon and scholar Juan Antonio Llorente criticized it in 1805, as it had the error of omitting or leaving out several villages which were also Rioja, especially in La Rioja Baja and were an integral part of the 7 valleys which with their respective rivers run from the Tirón in the west to the Alhama in the east and which are all entirely Riojan. (Note: He delivered a speech to the members of the Royal Economic Society of La Rioja, one of the societies of Friends of the Country, founded in the eighteenth century in accordance with the ideals of the Enlightenment.)

The first written references to the original terms —different variants documented in the Middle Ages— of the name of La Rioja, referred in the 11th century to a civil or ecclesiastical demarcation bordering the Montes de Oca, with a boundary to the west in the town of Belorado and Briones to the east, corresponding to the basins of the rivers Tirón and Oja. As time went by, the name would expand during the Middle Ages, naming an increasingly larger territory, as a consequence of political, social and territorial events that took place during that time. In medieval times, the name would spread eastward through the diocese of Calahorra, successively taking over the basins of the tributary rivers of the Ebro, Najerilla, Iregua, Leza, Cidacos, and so on, until it reached the Alhama in the east. In this way, the rest of the Rioja regions were named and the toponym Rioja was extended to cover the current boundaries. Its inhabitants were called riojanos —"riogensi" in the first written reference to the demonym— and this is how they were known. The expansion of La Rioja became such that even in the 17th, 18th and 19th centuries a region somewhat larger than the current Autonomous Community was identified by this name. No studies have yet been carried out on how and why this territorial expansion took place, but everything seems to suggest that two of the events that made it possible were the foundation of the village of Santo Domingo de la Calzada in the 11th century, as well as the existence throughout history of different civil and ecclesiastical institutions that were distinctly Riojans, such as the merindad of Rioja, the archpriesthood of Rioja or the medieval corregimiento of Rioja.

Subsequently, following the conquest of America by the Spanish empire, the toponym Rioja would be applied to various territories populated by Riojans of European origin on this continent. The same would happen in the current province of Almería, as a consequence of the conquest of the Emirate of Granada.

== Historical mentions ==
The first documented mention is usually considered to be the one that appears in the Fuero de Miranda de Ebro, granted by the monarch Alfonso VI in 1099, where it appears as Rioga and Riogam, or written as Rioxa and Rioxam, pronounced as Rioja and Riojam. For Tomás Ramírez, the importance of the text lies in the fact that it is a transcription of the toponym that can be considered Romance, something that does not happen in other documents in which the term is translated into Latin, so it appears with different spellings (rivo de ogia, rivo de Oia....).

[...] Omnes homines de terra lucronii, aut de nagera, aut de rioga, qui uoluerint transire mercaturas uersus alauam, aut de aliam terram ultra ebro, aut omnes de alaua, aut de alia terra quacumque uersus lucronium, aut ad nagaram, aut riogam, transeant per mirandam et non per alia loca: si non perdant mercaturas; et de lucronio ad mirandam non sit pons nec barca. (Note: In addition, all the men of land of Logroño, or Nájera, or Rioja who intend to pass goods to Álava or any other land to Logroño, Nájera or Rioja, will pass through Miranda and not through other places. Otherwise, the goods will be lost. And from Logroño to Miranda there should be no bridge or boat. Translation from the first volume of Historia de La Rioja.', p. 40.)

— Fuero de Miranda de Ebro, year 1099.

In the same Fuero de Miranda de Ebro it is also stated:

de Campaxares, aut de Burobia, aut de terra de Naxera, aut Lucronio, per caminum usque ad Oca et Ribodeoja ad inferius usque dum cadit in Ebro. (Note: From Campazar or Bureba, from the land of Nájera or Logroño, along the road to Oca and Rioja and down to the Ebro.)

— Fuero de Miranda de Ebro, year 1099.

According to this, in the 11th century Rioja would be understood as the lands between Belorado to the west and Briones to the east, which are the basins of the rivers Oja and Tirón. Subsequently, the name would gradually expand as it was used to refer to an increasingly larger territory, until it reached the east to the river Alhama, covering the current boundaries, as can be deduced from other references to La Rioja written in successive centuries.

However, although the aforementioned charter of Miranda de Ebro in 1099 is traditionally considered to be the oldest document in which the toponym Rioja appears as Rioga, there is an earlier text related to this subject in folio 63 of the Becerro Galicano de San Millán de la Cogolla, dated 1082. It is also written in Latin and it mentions a disappeared town called Irahuri located in rivo de ogga, which Bermudo Gutierrez and his wife Godina donated to the monastery of San Millán. It reads as follows:

In nomine Christi redemptoris nostri. Ego quidem senior Veremudus Gutier et uxor mea dompna Gutina, placens nobis, promto corde, spontanea voluntate, ut pro anime nostre remedium concedimus et confirmamus ab honorem sancti Emiliani presbiteri et tibi, presenti patri Alvaro abbati, cum ceteris monachis ibi Deo servientibus, in Rivo de Ogga, in villa Irahuri nostras comparaciones, solares et divisas, integrum et libero.

— Folio 63 of the Becerro Galicano de San Millán de la Cogolla, year 1082.

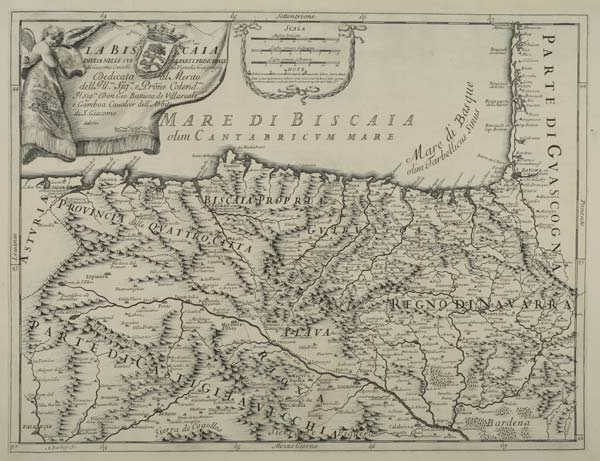
Italian map of La Biscaia. Alava, Vizcaya, Guipúzcoa, Navarra and La Rioja appear written with the spelling "Rioxa". Year 1696.

According to Eduardo Aznar Martínez, (Note: Eduardo Aznar Martínez is an anthropologist and historian. He has researched the traces of the Basque language in some areas such as La Rioja. He has written books on this subject such as El Euskera en La Rioja. Primeros testimonios and Tierras, gentes y voces. El legado del euskera riojano. In the latter he analyzes the toponymy, lexicon and ancient Riojan anthroponymy of Basque etymological origin. He also develops a theory on the origin of the toponym Rioja.) Irahuri is a village that has disappeared and is difficult to locate, probably near the Oja River, whose name comes from the Basque language. The term consists of two components: huri, which means 'village or populated place', and ira, which is more dubious and can mean 'fern, fernland'. According to the experts who made the transcription and digital edition of the Becerro Galicano, this locality was close to the municipality of Casalarreina.

There is also a reference prior to the fuero written in the year 1084 for some and in 1087 for others, in which there is evidence of a donation to the abbot of San Millán Don Blas of the monastery of San Sebastián, which is in the valley of Ojacastro, and then adds:

Et confirmo bobis illum locus beremun in summitate fluminis oggensis postium, cum omnibus suis pertinentiis....

— Letter of Alfonso VI, year 1087

The interpretation of this text is doubtful, since for Felipe Abad León and Eduardo Aznar Martínez it is clear that fluminis oggensis refers to a river and not to La Rioja. However, Tomás Ramírez considers that it is better to understand it from its context as a reference to a territory and therefore as the first translation of the Romance and ever older word Rioja into Latin.

Another deed prior to the aforementioned charter is clearer, appearing on folio 53 of the Becerro Galicano de San Millán, dating from the year 1095. It explains how the Infante de Pauleja gave himself to San Millán and donated his properties in La Rioja: "De Infante de Padulega carta in Rivo de Oia".

Joaquín Peña (Note: Monk of San Millán de la Cogolla and academic of history. In 1973 he published a selection of convent archives from the 11th to 14th centuries in which the word Rioja appears.) collected in documents of San Millán de la Cogolla from between the 11th and 14th centuries the different occurrences of the word Rioja, its spellings being: Rivvo de ogga (repeated and copied by other writers); in rivo de Oia (badly copied by Father Serrano and others following him); fluminis oggensis; et toti rivogio; in rivo de ogia; et rivo ogie; et rivo de oga; in tota rivogia (in 1191 rivo de ogga is repeated); rivogio; riogia (in a deed of 1214); rioga; riogensi (riojano or from La Rioja). According to Ramírez Pascual, (Note: Tomás Ramírez Pascual. Parish priest of Santo Domingo de la Calzada between 1981 and 1999. Writer of «La Rioja. Origen y etimología. De cómo Santo Domingo de la Calzada trajo "rioja" a La Rioja».) the name Rioja would have arisen orally at a time prior to these documentary mentions, in which it was transcribed in different ways (rivo de ogia, rivo de Oia....) because medieval scribes were trying to translate into Latin a name that was already in what can be considered Romance in order to capture it in cultured texts, which forced them to break down the toponym into several words or modify it in search of the archaic origin of the term, as is done today.

If the work of the aforementioned Joaquín Peña is used, eight deeds belonging to the monastery of San Millán de la Cogolla in which La Rioja is mentioned have come down from the 12th century to the present day. These appear with different spellings, such as rivo de oia, rivo de oga, rivo de ogia, rivo ogie, rivo de ogga, rivogio or rivogia. All of them correspond to texts written in Latin.

Facta carta huius donacionis, sub Era Mª. Cª. LXXIª. Rege Aldefonso regnante in tota Aragon et in Pampilonia et in toto rivo de Oia usque Belforato.

— Donation letter of 1133 of Alfonso I the Battler. Cartularios I, II and III from Santo Domingo de la Calzada.

From the 13th century, this author found three deeds in which La Rioja is mentioned. Two of them are written in Latin appearing as rivogio and riogia and one in Castilian. The latter is presented with its current spelling "Burueba et en Rioja". There is also another text in Latin from the year 1228, where the demonym riojano appears for the first time, written as riogeñ and riogensi, referring to an archpriest of the diocese of Calahorra called Martino Pascasii. There is also a document from the same century in which this demonym appears in Castilian and not in Latin, written with the spelling riojano. This is stanza 41 of the work entitled Vida de San Millán, by the poet Gonzalo de Berceo, where it indicates that the people of La Rioja come to honor the saint Millán.

Don Nunno, prestamero en Burueba et en Rioja.

— Minguella Collection, 13th century

From the 14th century a large number of documents have been found where the toponym La Rioja appears in writing. Most of them are written with the current spelling Rioja or Rioxa and in texts in Spanish. Likewise, the word "la" preceding the name can also be found in some of them.

Burueba et de la Rioja et de tierras de Nagera et daqui en adelante que non consientan que ningunos les pase contra la dicha mercet.

— Letters of Alfonso XI, 14th century.

In later centuries there are many texts written in Spanish and not in Latin, and the spelling with the written toponym is Rioja with almost no variations. In the 16th century, for example, this can be seen in a brief description of this land by the chronicler Florián de Ocampo in his book entitled Crónica general de España (General Chronicle of Spain) of 1544:

vna buena parte de tierra contenida dentro de las vertientes septentrionales, que fe figuen deftos montes y delas riberas del río Ebro fe dize comunmente Rioja, prouinçia muy abrigada, fertil y abundofa, llena de grandes prouechos.

— Florián Ocampo, Crónica General de España, year 1544

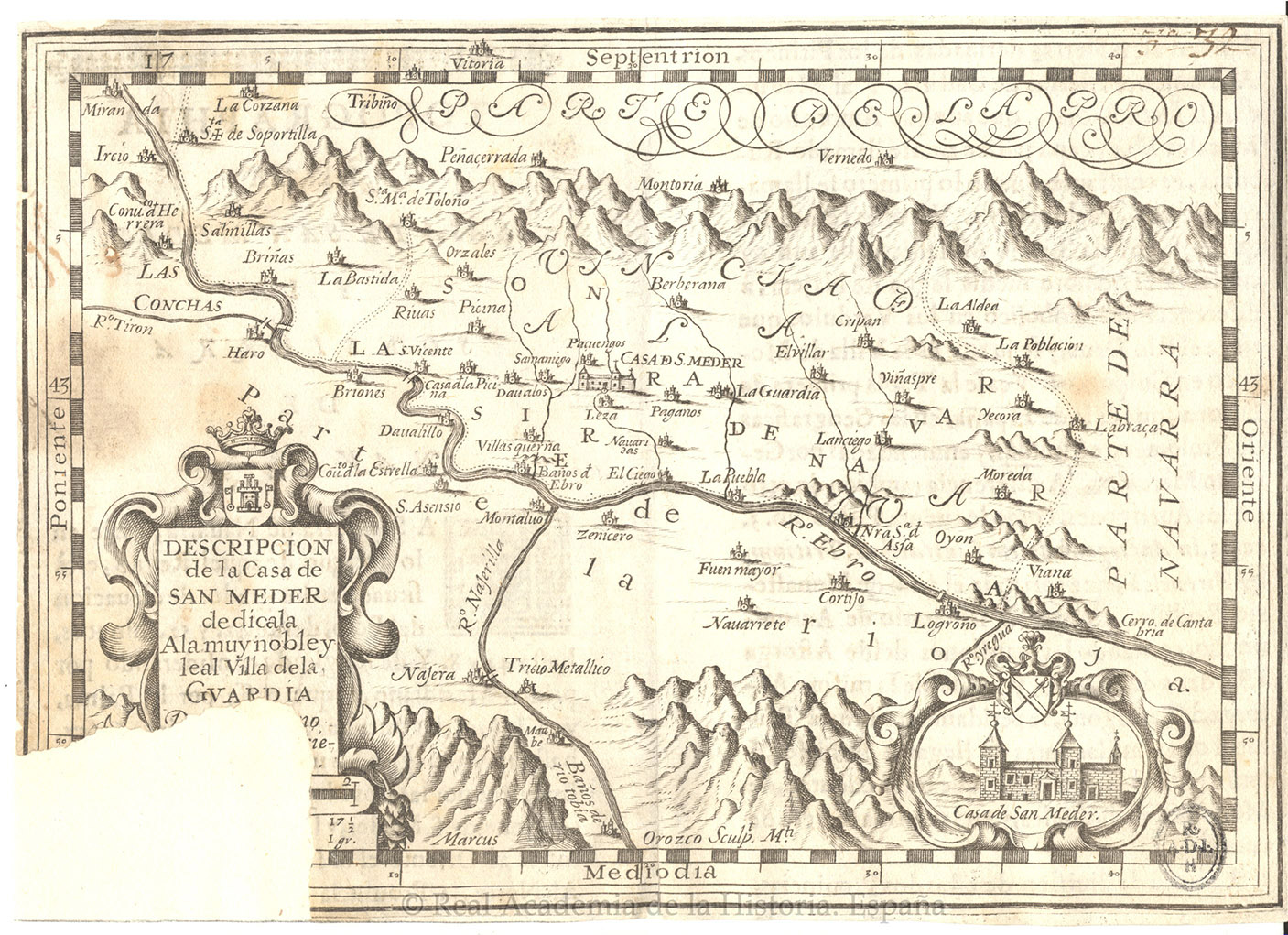
Map of the Casa de San Meder. Part of Álava and Navarra and part of La Rioja appear under the text "part of rioja" (Spanish: parte de la rioja) with the current spelling. Year 1678.

Other examples from the same century can also be mentioned, such as the book entitled Compendio Historial of 1571, by the historian Esteban de Garibay, which contains the word Rioja on many occasions. This is shown in a fragment of the book which indicates the presence of Martín Fernández Puerto Carrero in Alfaro, Calahorra, Logroño and other parts of La Rioja:

Martin Fernandez Puerto Carrero obedeciendo el mandato de fu rey, torno a Caftilla dexando buen prefidio, en toda la frontera en Alfaro, Calaorra, Logroño y otras partes de la Rioja

— Esteban de Garibay, Compendio Historial, year 1571

Another example, from the 17th century, is that of Albia de Castro, (Note: Fernando Albia de Castro was born in Logroño (La Rioja) in 1572, being baptized in the Iglesia de Santiago el Real. He lived most of his life in Lisbon, holding the position of Overseer General of the Royal Navy Army of the Ocean Sea of the people of war and galleys of the Kingdom of Portugal. He wrote several works until his death.) from Logroño, in his 1633 work entitled Memorial y Discurso político por la muy noble y muy leal ciudad de Logroño (Memorial and Political Speech for the very noble and loyal city of Logroño), where he describes the city as being located in La Rioja:

tiene fu afsiento la mui noble y mui leal ciudad de Logroño en la prouincia de la Rioja

— Fernando Albia de Castro, Memorial y discurso político por la muy noble y muy leal ciudad de Logroño, year 1633.

In addition, from the 16th century, it is possible to see more references to this land, such as in the geographical document entitled Parte del Atlas Mayor o Geographia Blaviana Que contiene las Cartas y Descripciones de Españas of 1672, which lists several cities, indicating that some of those mentioned, such as Calahorra, Santo Domingo de la Calzada, Arnedo, Nájera and Logroño, are located in La Rioja:

Calahorra en la Rioja; (...) S.Domingo, Logroño, Naxara, y Arnedo, en la Rioja

— Officina de Juan Blaeu, Parte del Atlas Mayor o Geographia Blaviana Que contiene las Cartas y Descripciones de Españas, year 1672

It can also be found very abundantly with the spelling Rioxa. This is reflected, for example, in this paragraph of the book entitled El glorioso thaumaturgo español redemptor de cautiuos Spto Domingo de Sylos, hijo del patriarca San Benito of the year 1668 in which it mentions that Santo Domingo de Silos was a hermit in Navarra and La Rioja:

Pero que Santo Domingo de Sylos aya fido ermitaño en Navarra, o en la Rioxa, va a dezir poco para nueftro argumento; y efte pleyto toca a los Rioxanos y Navarros, pues fon los interefados en aver tenido por vezino y morador a vn Santo tan prodigiofo, que cualquiera fe puede grloriar de falir con él.

— Juan de Castro, El glorioso thaumaturgo español redemptor de cautiuos Santo Domingo de Sylos, hijo del patriarca San Benito, year 1688

Or in this fragment of the book titled El ente dilucidado : discurso vnico nouissiº q[ue] muestra ay en naturala. animales irracionales inuisibles y quales sean of the year 1676, work of Antonio de Fuentelapeña, in which he indicates that the municipality of Anguiano is located in La Rioja:

y efpecialmente en la villa de Anguiano, que es en la Rioxa

— Antonio de Fuentelapeña, El ente dilucidado : discurso vnico nouissiº q[ue] muestra ay en naturala. animales irracionales inuisibles y quales sean, year 1676

In the 18th century, in addition to the many written references to La Rioja, we can also mention works in which La Rioja is the protagonist or constitutes the main space in which the story unfolds. Some examples are the books entitled Historia de Santo Domingo de la Calzada, Abraham de La Rioja by José González de Tejada, (Note: José González de Tejada was born in Gallinero de Cameros (La Rioja) in the year 1636, was a major collegiate of San León de la Universidad de Alcalá de Henares, of Santa Cruz de Valladolid and of Santa María de Palencia y la Calzada, doctor from the University of Alcalá de Henares, magisterial canon of the churches of Palencia and Santo Domingo de la Calzada and bishop of Durango in Nueva Vizcaya (Mexico). He wrote the work that now occupies and died as a canon of the Holy Primate Church of Toledo in 1704, where he remains buried.) published in 1702, or Recetario de las sustancias que se emplean en la elaboración de los tintes y maneras con que se tinen los hilados de lana, los merinos, estameñas, paños y bayetas que se tejen en los pueblos de Cameros en la provincia de La Rioja by Vicente del Saz, published in 1775. However, one of the most outstanding works of the 17th century dealing with this region is the Compendio historial de la provincia de la Rioja, de sus santos y milagrosos santuarios, (Note: This work is especially relevant and outstanding in the history of La Rioja, as it is often mentioned in later works. There is a paragraph from it that is often quoted in works of history, where its author, the friar Anguiano, gives a succinct description of La Rioja, in which he indicates that it borders the kingdoms of Navarre and Aragon, the lands of Burgos and Soria and the provinces of Alava and La Bureba, as well as describing that it is divided into Alta and Baja and that its inhabitants are called riojanos and are known as such.) by the friar Mateo Anguiano, (Note: Little is known about this author. Even the historian Felipe Abad León doubts that this was his birth name and not his professional name. He also doubts his date of birth. Several works that he wrote from the 17th century onwards are known. In this paragraph he explains that the bishopric of Tarazona did not go beyond the city of Alfaro in La Rioja at that time, but that it previously covered all of it, both the Upper and Lower Rioja) published for the first time in 1701, from which the following text is extracted:

Al prefente no paffa en la Rioja de la ciudad de Alfaro el Obifpado de Tarazona, Ciudad bien cercana a la de Calahorra, ni fe eftiende a Garay, porque efte pueblo toca a Ofna. Mas con todo efto, en aquellos tiempos, fe eftendia a las partes dichas, por mas de vente y ocho leguas de largo, y cogia a toda la Rioja, alta, y baxa, fus tierras, y la comarca de Garay

— Fray Mateo Anguiano, Compendio historial de la provincia de la Rioja, de sus santos y milagrosos santuarios, year 1701

The previous paragraph describes how at the date of writing the bishopric of Tarazona did not go beyond the city of Alfaro in La Rioja, but in earlier times it covered the whole of La Rioja, both Upper and Lower, as well as the district of Garay.

As for the aforementioned work by José González de Tejada entitled Historia de Santo Domingo de la Calzada, Abraham de La Rioja of 1702, we can quote the following fragment in which he delimits the area which as he describes was called Cantabria and which covered the whole of La Rioja with its Cameros mountains as well as other territories:

Pero en otros fe llamó Cantabria a toda la Montaña de Burgos y Afturias hafta Zea de Campos, y las tres provincias de Alava, Vizcaya, y Guipuzcoa, y toda la Rioja , con fus motañas de los Cameros.

— José González de Tejada, Historia de Santo domingo de la Calzada Abraham de La Rioja, year 1702

== Theories of the origin of Rioja ==
=== Río Oja (river Oja) ===
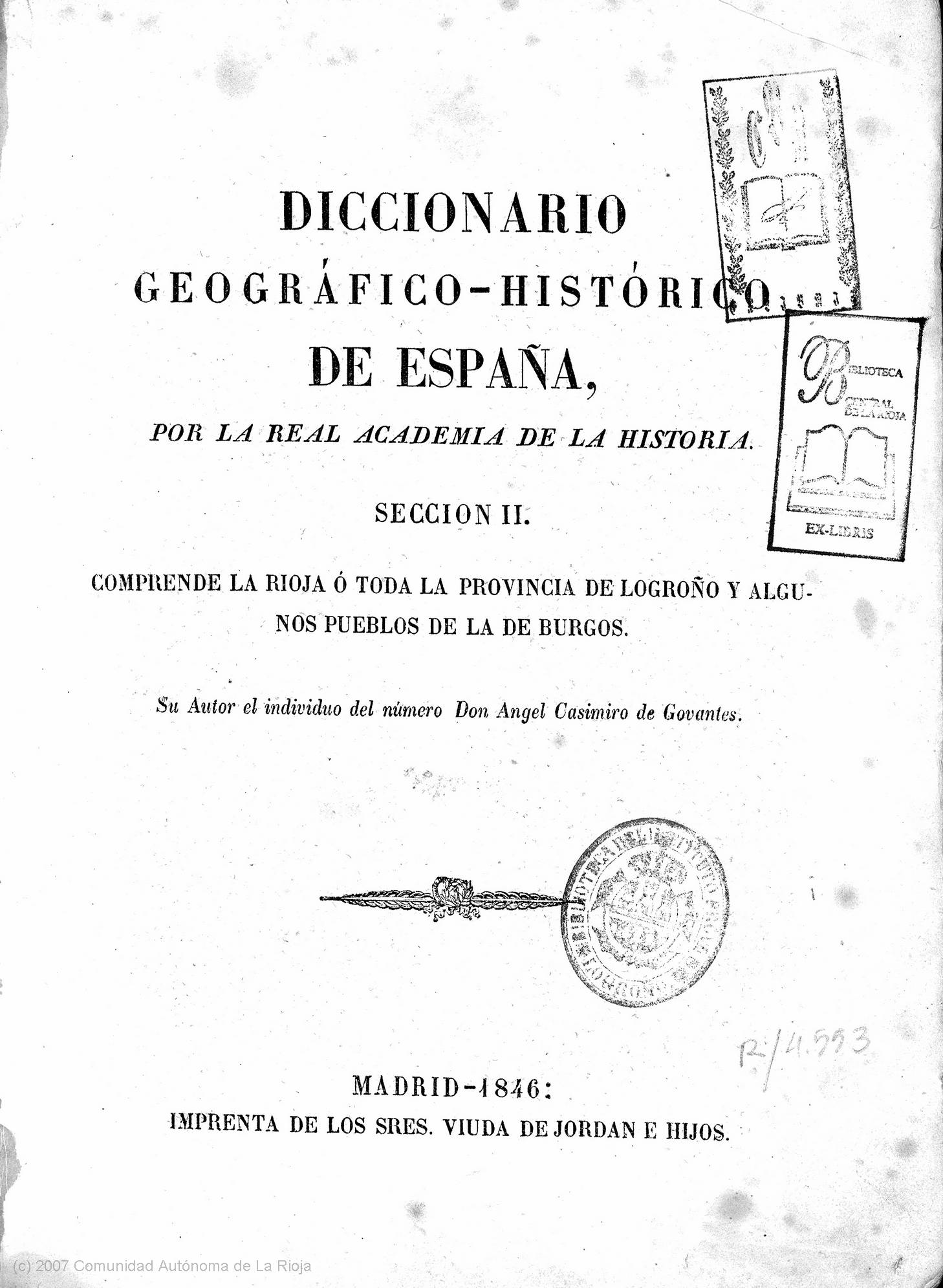
Cover of the book entitled: Diccionario geográfico-histórico de España, by the Real Academia de la Historia. Section II: "Comprises La Rioja or the entire province of Logroño and some towns in the province of Burgos." It is the work of Ángel Casimiro de Govantes and in it, among many other things, describes one of the theories about the etymology of the place name Rioja (1846).

The most popular theory indicates that it would take its name from the river Oja. The word would have come from the elements rivus (ablative rivo which in Spanish would be río) and the evolution ogga, ogia, ogie, oga, which ends in Oja. In antiquity, the two components of the same would merge. Several authors have proposed this etymological theory based on tradition or ancient documentation, such as Ángel Casimiro de Govantes in 1846, Pascual Madoz in 1850, Ildefonso Zubía in the 19th century, López Barrón in 1900, Julio Santamaría in 1926, Agustín Urcey Prado in 1932, Justiniano García Prado in 1952 and Menéndez Pidal in two works of 1926 and 1962 gave this Oja a natural etymology, which would be given by the leaves shed mainly by the beeches, holm oaks and bushes of the surrounding valley, which would cover its waters at certain times of the year. (Note: These theories appear respectively by author in the following books and documents: Diccionario geográfico-histórico de La Rioja o toda la provincia de Logroño y algunos pueblos de la de Burgos, Diccionario geográfico-estadístico-histórico de España y sus posesiones de Ultramar, Flora de La Rioja which was written in the 19th century, but published posthumously in 1921, an article written in Diario La Rioja entitled Rioja antigua, various articles published in the newspaper La Rioja, Historia de Valvanera, La Rioja como región geográfica, Los orígenes del Español and En torno a la lengua Vasca.) Joaquín Peña in 1973, as Felipe Abad León subscribes, after reviewing the medieval documents he found in which the toponym Rioja appears, reached the same conclusions. However, the ogga component of the word which would derive in oja is of unknown meaning for the expert.

In any case, the association between the name of this watercourse and that of the region has been raised since ancient times. For example, the chronicler Florian de Ocampo already pointed it out in 1544, as did Rodrigo Méndez Silva in a work published in 1675, writing the phrase «la provincia Riojana, afsí nombrada por el Río Oja, territorio de los regalados, agradables y abundofos de Efpaña, con falutiferos baños de Arnedillo....» or Father Murillo Velarde in 1752 said that "Logroño is the head of La Rioja, said of the river Hoja".

Numerous scholars on the subject, such as the linguist Benito Izquierdo, Guillermo Rittwagen and Tomás Ramírez, have argued against this theory. Thus, the latter, in his 2005 work, argues that the earliest medieval writings he has studied never speak of a river called Oja, but rather mention it as ilera, illera or glera because it was a rocky ravine that remained dry for long months of the year. The appearance of this name in the documents is subsequent to the mention of the name Rioja, so this cannot be its origin. Some quotations from the Middle Ages interpreted by other authors as references to the river Oja are in fact, due to their context, Latin translations of the ever older word Rioja. This would therefore be an incorrect popular etymology (paretology) that would have been traditionally maintained from very ancient times, as in many other cases. Guillermo Rittwagen reached similar conclusions in 1920. This author explains that Glera is the oldest term to designate the geographical feature, as well as arguing that it occupies only part of La Rioja and, nevertheless, there are also territories in La Rioja which are far away from it and bathed by other streams, which is why it would be incongruous to seek its baptism in the Glera. On the other hand, he also rejects the idea that the term Oja comes from the leaves that carry its waters, since it lacks them almost all year round, making it a stony riverbed.

In contrast, other researchers do describe mentions in the oldest medieval documentation of a river course called Oja. This is defended by Eduardo Aznar Martínez in 2010, even finding the Basque toponym Val de Oiaco Harana in Villalobar, which literally means 'the valley or hollow of the Oja', from which he deduces that this would be the noun used by the Basque-speaking community in the area to refer to the riverbed. There are also references to localities surrounded by its waters, such as Ojacastro, written as Olia Castri in the year 1045, whose first component of the term is 'Oja', translated as 'castro del Oja'. The same thing happens with the uninhabited village of Ajugarte whose name appears written in 1087 as Oggobarte or Oggabarte coming from 'oiha-ubarte' that would mean in Basque 'between waters of the Oja, fluvial island of the Oja'.

=== Land of streams, Rivalia ===
Tomás Ramírez carried out a study in 2005, analyzing medieval documentation in an attempt to find the etymological origin of the toponym Rioja.

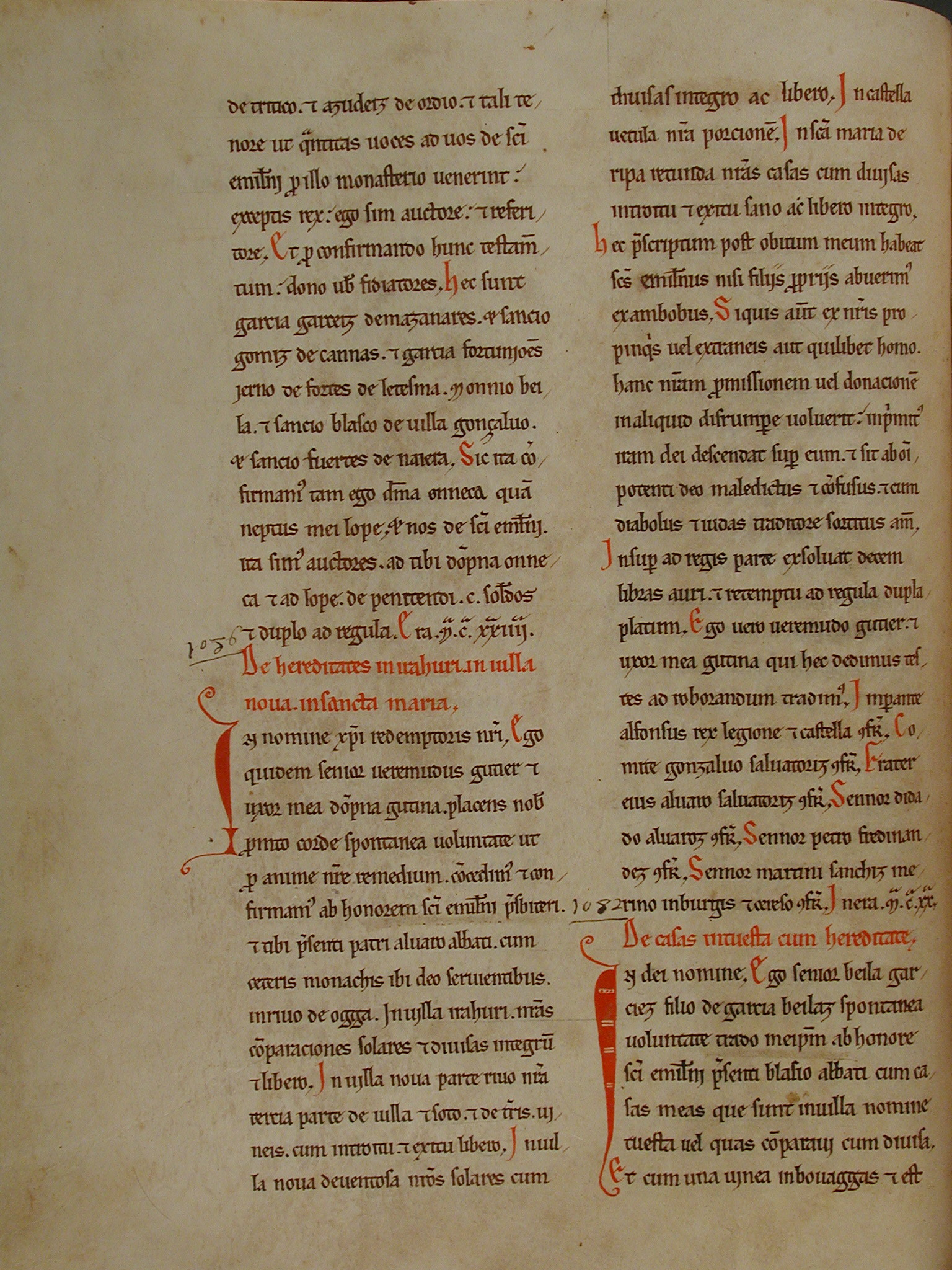
A page from the Becerro Galicano of San Millán de la Cogolla in which La Rioja is mentioned, with the name transcribed as rivo de Ogga. Year 1082.

It was the custom of scribes during the Middle Ages to translate popular toponyms in Romance or other languages into Latin in order to be able to translate them into the cultured texts written in that language. To do so, they would break the word into several parts or modify it in an attempt to find the archaic origin of the term, as is done today. For this reason, Tomás Ramírez Pascual, like other authors, (Note: Ángel Casimiro de Govantes in 1846, Joaquín Peña in 1973 and Felipe Abad León in 1980, among others.) affirms that the mentions that appear in medieval texts written as rivo de ogia or rivo de Oia are Latin transcriptions of the Romance word Rioja, since it is evident from the context of the texts that the name does not refer to a riverbed called Oja, but to a territory. This idea is also supported by the fact that ancient writings from the 11th century have been preserved in which the word 'Rioja' is transcribed in Romance as Rioga (Note: In the Fuero de Miranda de Ebro of the year 1099.) and later, from the 12th century onwards, it appears broken down and Latinized as rivo de ogia or rivo de Oia. Because of this, the author hypothesizes that the name of the region does not come from the Oja river, as other experts, who base their assertions on such transcriptions, indicate. He tries to demonstrate this by analyzing the medieval documentation referring to the geographical feature, pointing out that in all of them it is called Glera, Ilera, Illera, Madre or 'the waters', without the term 'Oja' appearing in the oldest texts in reference to a riverbed. He also points out that in them the Glera is never considered and called river, since it is a stony ravine that remains dry during most of the year. Neither is its valley called 'Oja valley', but on the contrary it is called 'Ojacastro valley' valle de Oggacastro or 'Ezcaray valley' Vall d'Ezcaray. In summary, the author concludes by saying that at the time when the toponym Rioja appears, the watercourse did not receive the name 'Oja', but rather Glera, Illera or 'Madre' and therefore its toponymic origin cannot be sought there.

After rejecting the aforementioned arguments that the toponym comes from the river Oja and considering that the spellings rivo de ogia, rivo de Oia, etc., which appear in the documentation are Latin translations of the word Rioja, he analyses the ancient writings to find out what limits were covered by the primitive La Rioja referred to in the first medieval references. He then thinks that the primitive Rioja was located between the rivers Oja or Glera and Tirón and the mountains of Yuso. Given that this is an area with a large number of streams, he hypothesizes that the original term from which the name comes from would mean 'land of streams'. He also believes that it was Santo Domingo de la Calzada who was responsible for the toponym Rioja beginning to spread eastwards in the Middle Ages to eventually end up denominating a much larger territory. This nominal expansion was also due to the enormous influence that the city of Santo Domingo de la Calzada would exert over the whole region.

Claudio García Turza found in Codex 31 of the monastery of San Millán de la Cogolla the term rialia in the following text. After studying the document, he indicated that it comes from the feminine singular noun of the Latin locution rivalia.

muscus: lanugo In sparti similitudinem, unde et "muscosi fontes"; Auca . rialia.

— Codex31. 63v 1, 10.

This term is the neuter collective plural of 'rivum' with diminutive ending, which would mean streams or gutters. According to Tomás Ramírez, the word Rioja would have been derived from this word as rialia-riolia-rioja, which would leave the previous phrase translated as "next to Oca is Rioja", Oca being the surrounding region currently known as Montes de Oca. When the word was popularly accepted and had to be translated into Latin in cultured documents, popular etymology would have been used, which ended up dividing the original word into two as Rivus de oia and with different forms (ogga, oga, ohia) that evolved with the passage of time. According to the author, the term Ogga would mean Eye (Spanish: ojo) or hole, which is a very frequent word to designate the birthplace of rivers. Therefore, this name would give rise to the popular etymology used by medieval scribes. The toponym Rioja would appear orally very early, around the 9th century, in the middle of the Christian repopulation, and would begin to be written down in the 11th century.

Antonino González Blanco records toponyms from several districts of La Rioja derived from Rivale and Rivalia such as El Riajo, Los Riajos, Riajondo, Riajuelo, Los Riajuelos, Riajillo Largo, Reazuelo and Riajales (recorded in Redecilla del Camino and in Viguera). In Santa Marina there is Matariajales and in Azofra and Pedroso Riojales, whose variant could be due to a river crossing.

=== Basque theories ===
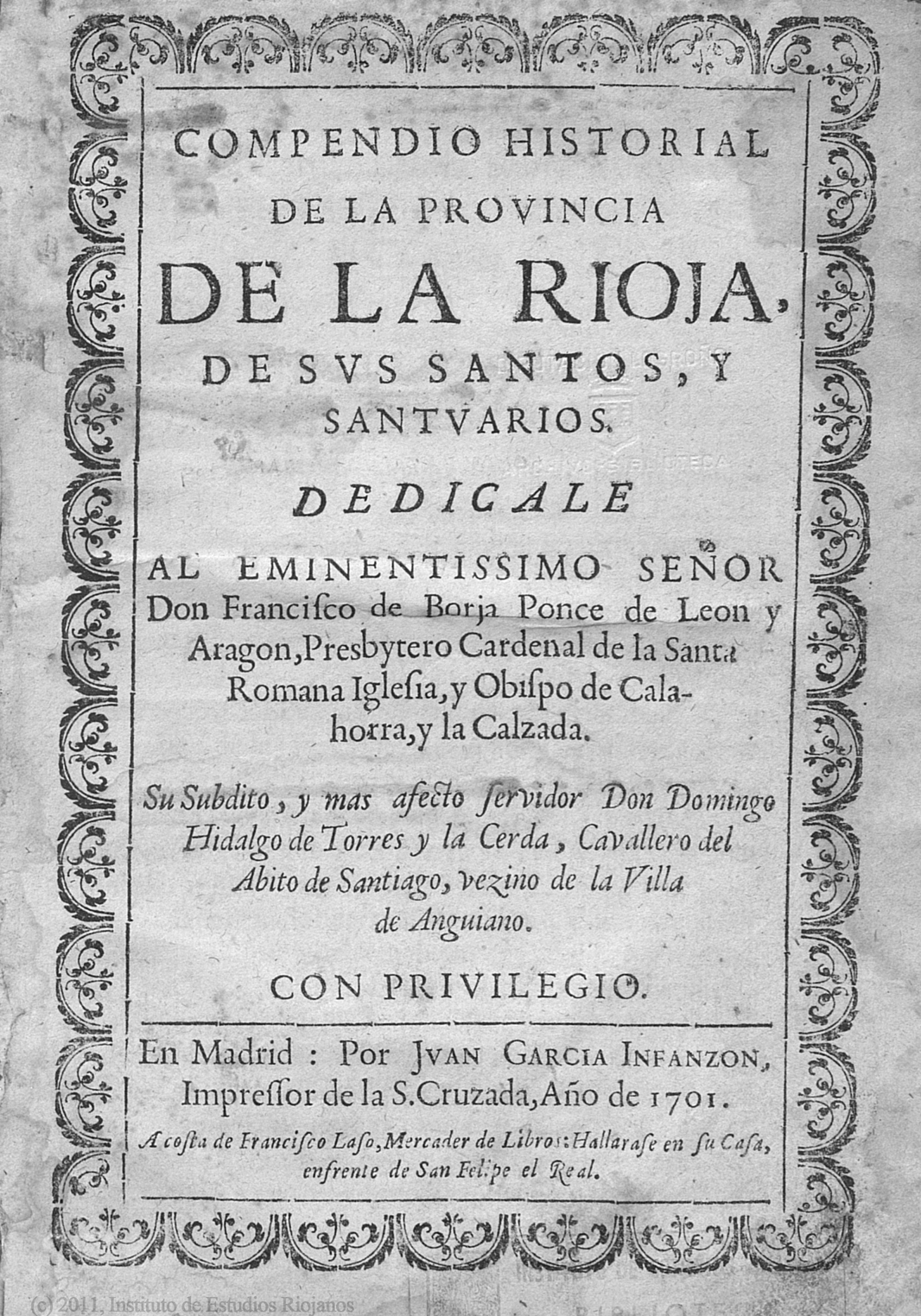
Cover of the book entitled: Compendio historial de la provincia de La Rioja, de sus santos y milagrosos santuarios. Work of Mateo Anguiano Nieva. In it, among many other things, he describes a theory about the origin of the place name Rioja. There are two editions of this work, one from 1701 and the other from 1704.

There are several theories that attribute an etymological origin in the Basque language. It seems that during the centuries when the name may have originated, La Rioja was influenced by this language. There are numerous toponyms in the region with major Basque etymology (towns) and minor (streams, terms, land features). According to Merino Urrutia, this can only be due to the fact that it was the language spoken by the tribes of Berones and Autrigones who lived there.

In 1701 and 1704, (Note: The book containing this theory has two editions, both of them having small variations between them. One of them dates from the year 1701 and the other from 1704.) Mateo Anguiano Nieva pointed out several etymological theories in his book entitled Compendio Historial de la Provincia de La Rioja (Historical Compendium of the Province of La Rioja). One of them is the origin of the toponym Rioja in the union of the Basque words erria and oguia, which mean land and bread, respectively, pronounced erriogia which would be translated as 'land of bread'. After this, the author continues discussing the arrival of Prince Oco, son of King Darius, to Montes de Oca, which is why, according to him, the mountains would be called that way, originating the name of La Rioja. However, the researcher Merino Urrutia, after analyzing these appraisals, states that all of them lack any historical and critical foundation.

In 1807, Manuel de Echevarría (Note: He was a native of Briones, professor of theology at the University of Salamanca and General of the order of Premostatenses.) in his Diccionario etimológico de voces provinciales de La Rioja (Etymological Dictionary of Provincial Voices of La Rioja) also suggested a Basque origin. (Note: Fray Manuel de Echevarría collected it in his Diccionario etimológico de voces provinciales de la Rioja, a manuscript preserved in the Biblioteca de la Diputación de Logroño. It remained unpublished until Cesáreo Goicoechea included it in his book Vocabulario riojano.)

In 1920, Guillermo Rittwagen, (Note: He was an engineer in the tax service, so due to his position he spent several seasons in Ezcaray where, as a result of his love of geography and history, he collected a lot of data on La Rioja. He soon observed the influence of the Basque language in it.) after analyzing medieval documentation, suggested that the river Oja would have taken its name from the town of Ojacastro and not vice versa. He also rejects with various arguments the idea that the name of the region comes from the name of this watercourse, explaining that Glera is the most archaic term to designate it, as well as the fact that it only covers part of La Rioja, so it would be incongruous to look for its origin in it. Instead, given the volume of toponyms in Basque in the area, he states that a more plausible etymology can be found in that language. In this way he indicates that the toponym La Rioja may be a corruption of the Basque words erri-oji or ojia whose translation is 'land or territory or land of bread' since the three words have their origin in the Basque erri which means 'bread land'. The name would come from the abundance of cereal crops in ancient times. (Note: Guillermo Rittwagen pointed this out in a lecture given at the Real Sociedad Geográfica on January 19, 1920 and later published it in his book Estudios sobre La Rioja (Studies on La Rioja), Madrid, Publicaciones de la Real Sociedad Geográfica, 1921.)

The criterion that postulated an Euskera origin for the toponym was also supported by Constantino Garrán, chronicler of Nájera, when he published in 1925 an article in the newspaper La Rioja, positioning the origin of the name of the region in the old Basque words Rivogia or Rioxa. The author's statements were criticized in turn by Julio Santamaría, chronicler of Santo Domingo de la Calzada, in different texts published in the same newspaper in 1926, where he denied its Basque origin and leaned towards the traditional popular theory that finds the origin of the toponym in the name of the river Oja.

The researcher José Juan Bautista Merino Urrutia, who carried out numerous works on the toponymy of La Rioja with Basque etymology from 1931 to 1978, estimated in one of them dated 1968 that it would come from the Basque root oia that translates as 'forest' (oihan in modern Basque), which by evolution would originate the terms ogga and later oja, and then put the Latin prename rivum that means 'river' before it. This would therefore be a hybrid conclusion that mixes the traditional theory that points to the river Oja and the Basque ones. This is indicated after collecting the different spellings of the voice in medieval documentation (Oia, Ogga, Ogia, Oxa...) and to the place of Ojacastro (Oia Castro, Olia Castri). Other Basque toponyms such as Oyarzun, Oria or Baroja would have in their composition the same germ. Likewise, the author affirms that Basque was the language of the ancient inhabitants of the area when the name of the river was born, taking into account the abundance of toponymy in this language in the area, as well as the existence of different documents and historical facts that would indicate this, such as the Fazaña de Ojacastro. Therefore, Merino Urrutia points out that it should be analyzed from the aforementioned linguistic root.

The gastronome and writer from Guipuzcoa José María Busca Isusi pointed to a possible origin in the union of the voices erri and hotza, which would be translated as 'cold land' and which would have derived in errioxa.

The linguist and expert in these themes, Benito Izquierdo, rejected other previous theories, both the most vulgar for him, finding the etymological origin in the river Oja, and the more complex ones, which look for it in terms such as Erriogía. In addition to this he contributed a new one that gave as origin the Basque word arrioxa, which is translated as 'much stone', synonymous of Glera, which is the name that formerly received the river Oja. (Note: Benito Izquierdo wrote the manuscript entitled Qué dice el vocablo Rioja de La Rioja. This was examined and reviewed in an article published by the journalist Manuel de las Rivas in the newspaper Nueva Rioja.)

=== Fluvial bed river, rivo Ohia ===
A more current theory is that of researcher Eduardo Aznar Martínez, presented in his work on Basque language in La Rioja in the antiquity, published between 2010 and 2017.

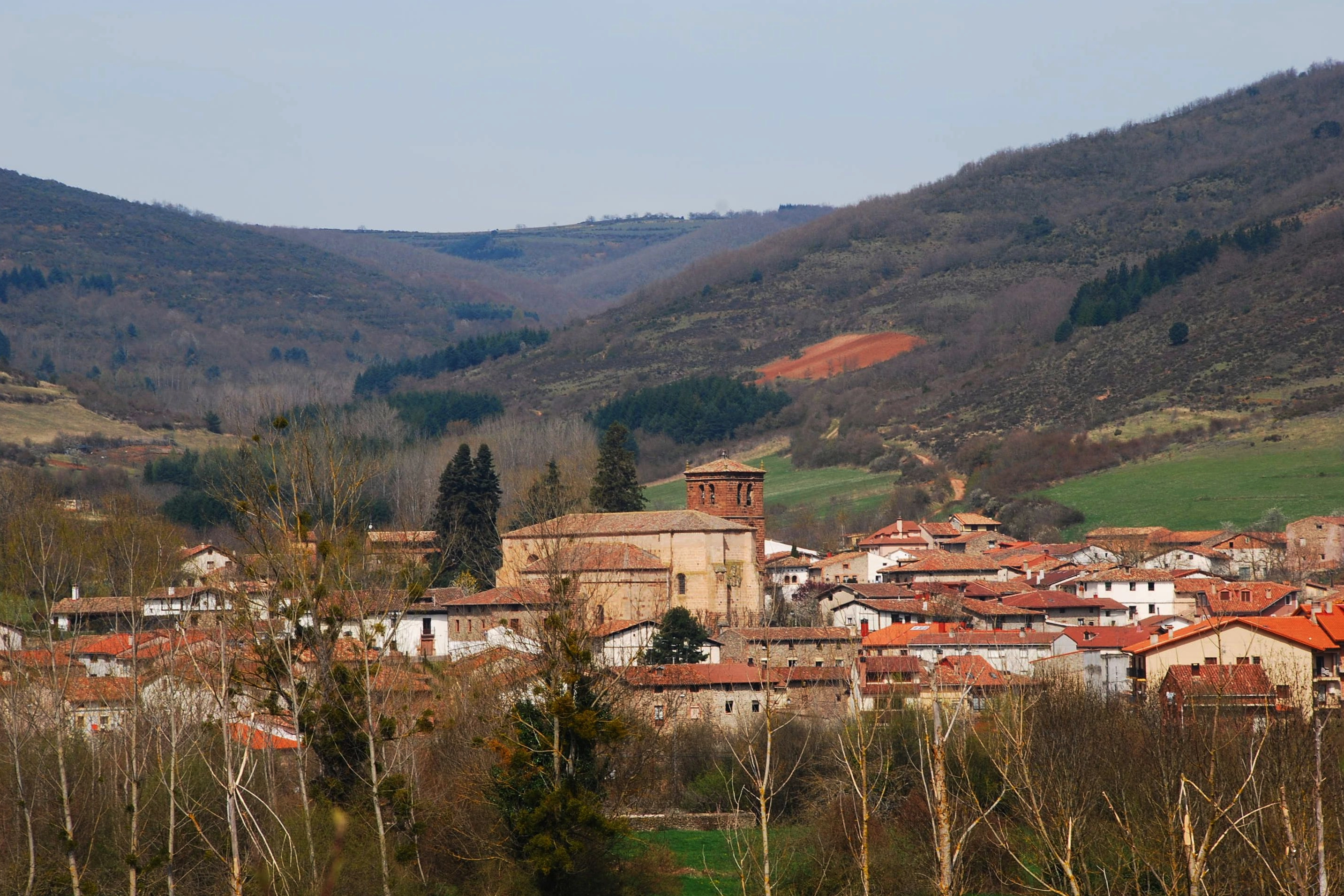
Municipality of Ojacastro at present.

The expert begins his approach by trying to prove that from very early times the riverbed that today we call Oja was already called that way, contrary to the arguments provided by other authors, who defend the idea that in the 11th century, –the time when the toponym Rioja appeared in writing– the river did not receive that name, but rather Glera, Illera or llera. To this end, he analyzes medieval documentation, reasoning that in several texts there is an allusion to a river course called in this way with different spellings, appearing as rivo de Ogga in 1082, flumminis Oggensis in 1087, riuo de Oiha in 1120, rivum de Oia in 1120, rivo Ogia in 1121, rivo de Oia in 1122 and 1133 and rio d'Oia in 1183 and 1198, as well as there is a deed from 1275 where it says "rio de Oia que dizen la Glera", which indicates that the names of the river Oja and Glera coexisted at the same time. At the same time, there are mentions of the municipality of Ojacastro written as Olia Castri in 1045 and 1056 and as Oia Castro in 1074. Given its location on the banks of the Oja, it is understood that the first component of the term is none other than the river and therefore, already received that name since ancient times. To place the name of the watercourse that flows through a locality next to its own, is something that is done nowadays to differentiate some municipalities from others with the same denomination. This happens, for example, with Cervera del río Alhama or Albelda de Iregua. This would also happen with Ojacastro, since then the word Castro would be very frequent to designate a multitude of places. He also deduces that the toponym of the locality comes from the Basque language, since its construction is made in the inverse of the Castilian in the form Oja-Castro and not Castro del Oja or Castro-Oja, something that is typical of the Basque language. In addition, he points out the proven presence of this language in the municipality in the Middle Ages. The component Castro would be a Romance loan. Something similar happens when analyzing the name of the village of Ajugarte, which appears in medieval writings as Oggobarte or Oggabarte in 1087 and later years. The toponym would have derived from the Basque oiha-ubarte, which means 'between waters of the Oja, fluvial island of the Oja'. This detail reinforces the idea that Oja was the name of the river at that time. Another Basque place name belonging to a corner of Villalobar that appears in the Becerro de Santo Domingo of 1380 as Val de Oiaco Harana, translated as 'the valley or hollow of the Oja', would indicate that the Basque-speaking population of the area was the one that called the river valley this way and that therefore the origin of the riverbed is unquestionably Basque. This appellative would coexist with the Romance term Glera, which would also be used to name it, as happened in many other cases. For example in Fresneda de la Sierra, whose denomination oscillated in the first dicuments between Lizárraga (from Lizar, equal to ash tree) and Fresneda until it opted for the current one as a result of the Castilian influence.

From this argument, it indicates that the name would come from the contraction of the Latin term Rivum river with Oja, the latter word coming from the Basque term Ohia which translates as 'bed' and by extension 'bed' or 'fluvial bed'. This would be in accordance with the meaning of the term Glera, which is gravel from the bed of a river, a name also given to this watercourse. Therefore we are faced with a tautology, that is, the repetition of the same idea in two different languages, something frequent in toponymy. As for the evolution of the term, the mutitude of spellings with which the denomination of the riverbed appears raises doubts about which could be its exact primitive pronunciation, but it can be thought that the -i- of Ohia would undergo a process of velarization until producing a sound similar to -x- that would be adapted by the Romance phonetics as -j-, resulting in the term Oja as we know it today. This toponym would have several Basque linguistic parallels that can be found in the house Ohié in Garraibie (Zuberoa) or Oya in the area of Yesa (Navarra). As for the article 'la' which precedes the name Rioja, it would seem that in the Middle Ages there was an administrative entity called La Merindad de Rioja from at least the year 1191. Over time the term was simplified to end up in the current expression of La Rioja. Aznar Martínez also believes that the concept of Rioja spread in the Middle Ages from the area that was first called Rioja to cover the entire territory that we know today as such due to various political, territorial and social circumstances that occurred in antiquity.

The author J.M. de Sansinenea published an article in 1968 in the bulletin of the Real Sociedad Vascongada de Amigos del País, in which he also tentatively suggested that the term Oja came from the Basque word for 'bed'. This conclusion, which he reached independently, coincides with that of Eduardo Aznar Martínez.

=== Other theories ===
The most fantastic theory is that of José González de Tejada in his book published in 1702 entitled Historia de Santo Domingo de la Calzada, el Abraham de La Rioja in which he explains that the name La Rioja derives from the name that the region supposedly had before, which was Ruconia, which would become Rivoja. In fact, the medieval Visigothic sources, when referring to the campaigns carried out by the Visigothic kings against the Rucones, are more against the inhabitants of the Roncal valley than against the inhabitants of La Rioja.

The friar Mateo Anguiano in his Compendio historial de la provincia de La Rioja of 1701, in addition to his Basque theory on the origin of the toponym Rioja, developed others such as that it could come from rivossa from the Latin term rivus, because of the abundance of streams, or from Roxa, similar to the word red, because that is the color of La Rioja.

The researcher of the history of language Enrique Cabrejas in an article published in 2017, points out that the name of the toponym Rioja was given by the Celtiberians, specifically the Cario and would come to mean in their language 'The Daughter of the River'.

== Other denominations ==
Different terms were used to refer to areas of La Rioja which were not well defined or to all of it. Justiniano García Prado lists the following: Beronia, Ruconia, Cantabria, Celtiberia, Carpentania and Meltria, and Casimiro de Govantes also mentions Veled Assikia.

- Beronia: this was the name given to the territory occupied by the pre-Roman people of the Berones, who inhabited most of La Rioja.
- Ruconia or Ruconiae: for a time it was thought that the people of the Ruccones mentioned in the Gothic history corresponded to those known today as Riojanos, but Miguel Cortés y López, in his Diccionario Histórico Geográfico de España, is convinced that the Rucones would have been located in the Roncal Valley.
- Celtiberia: part of the present-day territory of La Rioja was part of the area that the Romans called Celtiberia.
- Meltria: Sancho the Great organized the kingdom of Pamplona into tenures, placing a trusted man in each of them. Around 1015 he created one called Meltria, whose exact location is unknown, but it is estimated to be in the Iregua-Leza region.
- Veled Assikia: Name given by the Arabs to La Rioja, meaning land of irrigation or land of irrigation ditches.

== Place name "La Rioja" in America ==
Following the colonization of America by the Spanish Empire, the name "La Rioja" was used to name various places in the so-called New World, which were populated or nominated mostly by Riojanos of Spanish origin. As a result, it can also be found in Argentina, Chile, Cuba and Peru.

=== In Argentina ===
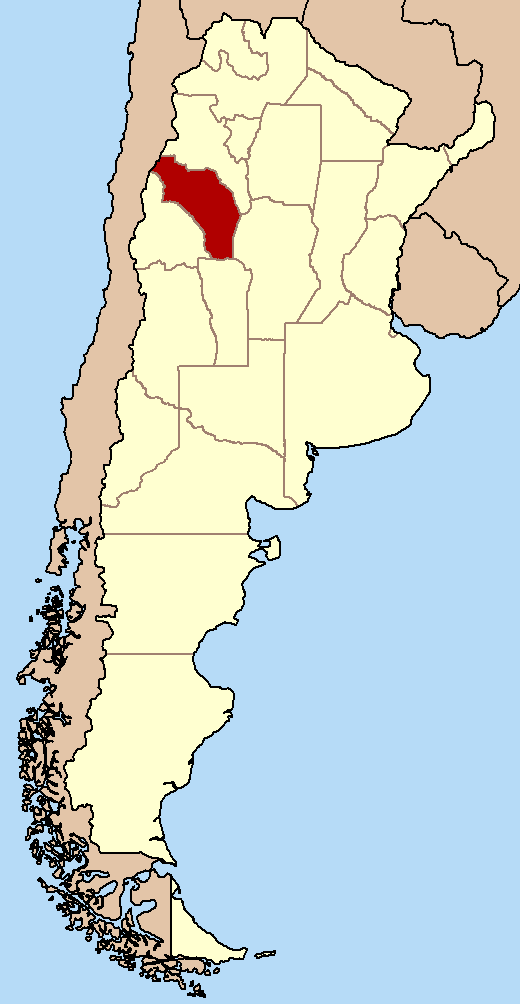
Location of the province of La Rioja in Argentina.

On May 20, 1591, the Spanish Riojan Juan Ramirez de Velasco, then governor of Tucuman, a vast region that encompassed the entire northwest of present-day Argentina, founded the city of Todos los Santos de la Nueva Rioja, at the foot of the first foothills of the Andes Mountains. In time, the city became known simply as La Rioja and gave its name to a wide region around it that gradually acquired increasing autonomy, until it was organized as the Province of La Rioja in 1814 and became one of the fourteen founding provinces of Argentina.

In addition to Juan Ramirez de Velasco himself, a native of the Spanish Rioja town of Estollo, there were 51 Spaniards in the founding of the city. Some of them are also known to have come from Spanish La Rioja, such as Juan Ramírez de Montalbo, presumed nephew of the founder and native of Logroño. The reason why he chose the name of his region of origin to baptize the new city was explained in a letter written on July 20, 1591 addressed to Philip II, which reads as follows:

And after having discovered more than fifty leagues long and thirty wide, and having found such a settlement as I could desire, on the banks of a river that comes out of Famatina... I founded and populated in the name of Your Majesty the city of Todos los Santos de la Nueva Rioja, by complying with all and having taken them for intercessors, and with the license of Your Majesty, and complying with my homeland (La Rioja). In which (city) I discovered apparently from ten to twelve thousand Indians, gallant and well-dressed people, with whom and with others the province has ...., I made in the name of Your Majesty fifty-six encomiendas, and I left a fort made which is suitable for the defense of fifty-one Spaniards and I left in it provided with weapons and ammunition and supplies.

— Juan Ramírez de Velasco, letter to Felipe II, July 20, 1591.

Another Spanish Riojan, Pedro del Castillo, founded the city of Mendoza on March 2, 1561, naming it Ciudad de Mendoza del Nuevo Valle de La Rioja, in a valley he called Nuevo Valle de La Rioja.

=== In Chile ===
In Chile there is a town called La Rioja located near Antofagasta, between Baquedano and Deseada.

=== In Cuba ===
In Cuba a town and by extension a neighborhood located in the municipality of Holguín, capital of the Province of Holguín, was called La Rioja.

Also in Cuba there is a river called Rioja that rises in the Iguaru mountain and flows into El Salado, tributary at the same time of the Cauto river that pours its waters into the Guacanayaba gulf, to the south of the island.

=== In Peru ===
In Peru, on September 22, 1772, Félix de la Rosa Reategui y Gaviria founded the city of Santo Toribio de la Nueva Rioja on the indigenous hamlet of Uquihua, which acquired the name of Rioja over time, sometimes identified as Rioja Perú and also known as "the city of hats". In 1935, the Province of Rioja was created, designating the city of Rioja as its capital, and including the District of Rioja as one of its districts. The Peruvian city would receive its name due to the request of one of its founders, the Spanish Riojan Don Juan José Martínez de Pinillos y Larios, born in Nestares.

== The place name "La Rioja" in Spain ==
=== In the autonomous community of La Rioja ===
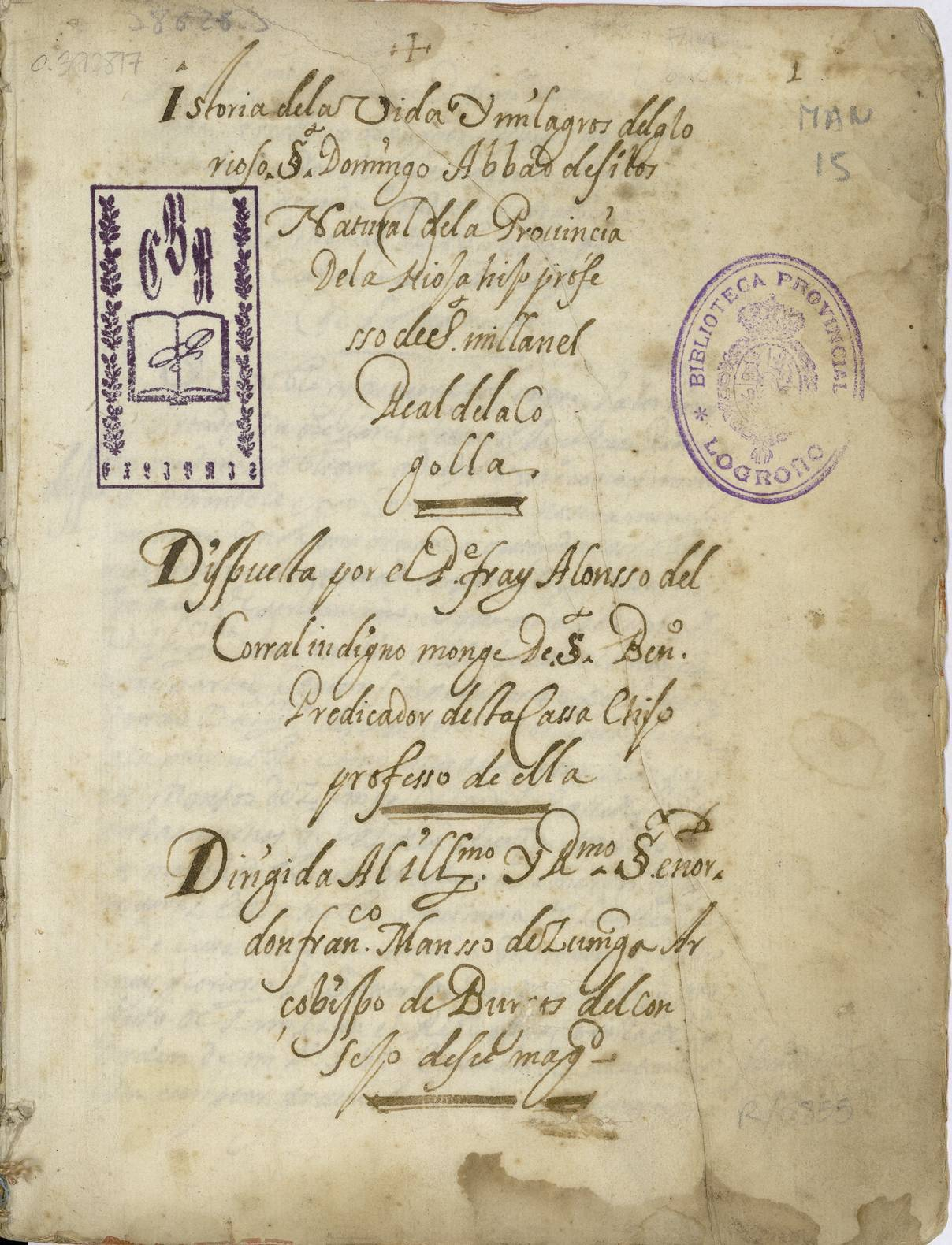
Manuscript title page from 1649 of the book entitled Istoria de la vida y milagros del glorioso S[ant]o Domingo, abbad de Silos, natural de la pronvicia de la Rioja, by Alonso del Corral.

The existence of a region called La Rioja has been documented since the 11th century. Although this term originally designated the area between the basins of the rivers Oja and Tirón, the name was gradually extended throughout the Middle Ages, when it was used to refer to an increasingly larger territory, until it came to be known as the entire area that encompasses the source, course and end of seven valleys and seven tributary rivers of the Ebro (Tirón, Oja, Najerilla, Iregua, Leza, Cidacos and Alhama) that runs from the Tirón in the west to the Alhama in the east, covering the current boundaries. Its inhabitants were called riojanos and were known as such. La Rioja is mentioned many times in ancient documentation from the 11th century onwards and has been shown on maps since the 17th century. La Rioja would then be the name given to a popular regional reality (geographical, cultural, historical and natural) although it lacked an administrative entity.

In 1701 the friar Mateo Anguiano described it in his book entitled Compendio historial de la provincia de La Rioja (Historical Compendium of the Province of La Rioja) as follows: "La Rioja is divided into high and low, the high part begins from Villafranca de Montes de Oca to Logroño and the low part from Logroño to Agreda and almost all of it is crossed along the Ebro River (.... ) all the towns contained in this demarcation belong to the said Province, and its natives are, and are called Riojanos in these times (...) The Province of La Rioja borders immediately with the Kingdoms of Navarre and Aragon, with the Provinces of Alaba and La Bureba, with the lands of Burgos and Soria". In 1769, Tomás López drew the first map of La Rioja as a natural region, since it was not yet a province. In 1790 the creation of the Real Sociedad Económica de La Rioja was approved, constituted in Fuenmayor and one of the Sociedades de Amigos del País founded in Spain during the Enlightenment. This institution initially had economic objectives, but its founding statutes already showed clear political intentions for La Rioja, using terms such as "País Riojano" (Riojan country), which would later be translated into a request for the creation of an administrative framework for the region. However, the first official request seeking to provide La Rioja with a political-administrative framework was issued in 1808 by the town council of Logroño in the midst of the war of independence. In their own words, they requested that this city "together with all the towns of La Rioja form a separate intendancy".

In 1808, during the war of independence, the Junta de la Comisión de Armamento e Insurrección General de La Rioja was constituted, grouping all the guerrillas of La Rioja and which had its headquarters in Soto de Cameros. It was circumscribed, according to a text of the time, to the area "from the river Tirón to the Alhama, including the city of Alfaro and all the mountain ranges whose waters flow into the Ebro", a phrase which clearly refers to the seven riverbeds which delimit La Rioja. The aforementioned board was dissolved in 1811 and on December 8, 1812, a year later, a meeting of representatives of the towns of La Rioja was held in the town of Santa Coloma, known as the Convention of Santa Coloma, where a document was sent to the Supreme Council of Regency requesting the institutionalization of La Rioja as a Spanish province. The document reads as follows: "Your Majesty is requested that, following the system of making your children happy, you dispense to the Riojanos the grace that this Province be considered as such, according to the old demarcation, and that, ceasing all subsequent distributions, it be governed by itself...".

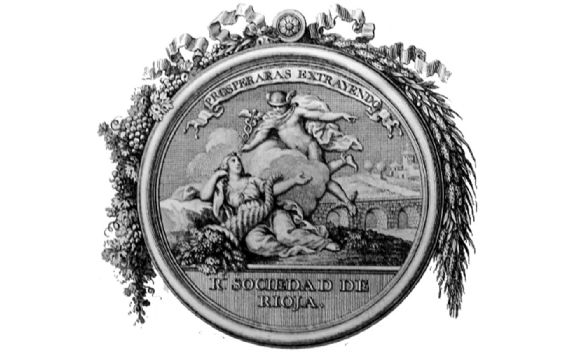
Emblem of the Real Sociedad Económica de La Rioja, 1790.

In 1813, Don Antonio Norberto Fernadez de Navarrete wrote a letter requesting that La Rioja be endowed with a provincial administrative framework entitled Discurso sobre la necesidad, utilidad y ventajas que resultarían a la Rioja y al Estado, en su erección a Provincia Política de la Monarquía, e independiente de las demás. In it he argued both geographical and historical criteria, as well as the differences in character and customs between the inhabitants of La Rioja and the inhabitants of the surrounding territories. One sentence in it goes like this: "But a Soriano, a Burgos and an Alavese resemble a Riojan as a Scandinavian resembles an Andalusian....".

The constitution of 1812 proposed to reform the administrative territorial division of Spain. Thus began the design of the new political map of the country, a task which, after the war of independence, was put on hold until the military uprising of General de Riego in 1820 and the beginning of the Liberal Triennium, where it was once again raised. It was then that in 1820 the Real Sociedad Económica de La Rioja published a document entitled Exposición de las razones que la Sociedad Riojana y los Comisionados por los pueblos de su distrito presentan al Congreso Nacional en apoyo de su solicitud para que en la Rioja se forme una Provincia separada e independiente with the aim of establishing La Rioja as a province. That same year, the illustrious Martín Fernández de Navarrete wrote a letter with the same purpose stating "to beg your Majesty to deign to grant the illustrious and fertile Rioja the title of independent province".

So many demands by the people of La Rioja finally gave results, so that La Rioja appeared in 1821 in the report by Bauzá and Larramendi, which divided Spain into 47 political governments. In his own words, it is described as "La Rioja, a country naturally enclosed by the great range of mountains, called Iduvedas to the south and by those of Oca to the west, (...) with seven rivers that rise and fall within it (...) circumstances all of which are more appropriate to form the province .....". As for its name, on June 19 of the same year, the opinion of the Commission for the Division of the Spanish Territory is read, which reads as follows: "The commission has believed that this province should keep the name it has already had for a long time, and that Logroño should be designated as its capital, which due to its population, location and other advantages seems to be the most suitable town for it". A few months later, on 15 October, the courts responded affirmatively to the demands of La Rioja, so that the establishment of La Rioja as a province was approved. An official letter from Madrid to Logroño, reporting on this, reads as follows: "In the session of the Courts held this day, La Rioja was declared an independent province under the name of the province of Logroño, with this city as its capital", although the decree of provincial division was finally signed on 30 January 1822 by Ferdinand VII. As for the name given to the province, although in all the debates and work that took place in parliament in 1813 and 1814 - but especially in 1820 and 1821 - there was a constant reference to the province of La Rioja or La Rioja, since the historical criteria prevailed at first to designate the new Spanish provinces, in the end it could not retain its historical name of La Rioja, since the debates in the courts of 1821 opted for a terminological unification, giving all the districts the names of their capitals, except for the four foral provinces (Guipúzcoa, Vizcaya, Alava and Navarre). For this reason it was given the name of Logroño, eliminating the traditional denomination of the territory. According to historian Francisco Bermejo, the option of giving the provinces the names of their capitals with the consequent suppression of the traditional names of some territories such as La Rioja was due to a nominal conflict between the provinces of Huesca, Teruel and Zaragoza, since the latter had requested to be called Aragón, which led to a contrary reaction from the other two districts, so that to solve the problem it was decided to give most of them the names of their administrative seats. However, the province was annulled in 1823 after the entry into Spain of the troops of the Duke of Angoulême, known as the Hundred Thousand Sons of Saint Louis, which led to the repeal by Ferdinand VII of all liberal provisions and the return to absolutism, including the provincial division, leaving La Rioja once again without a province.

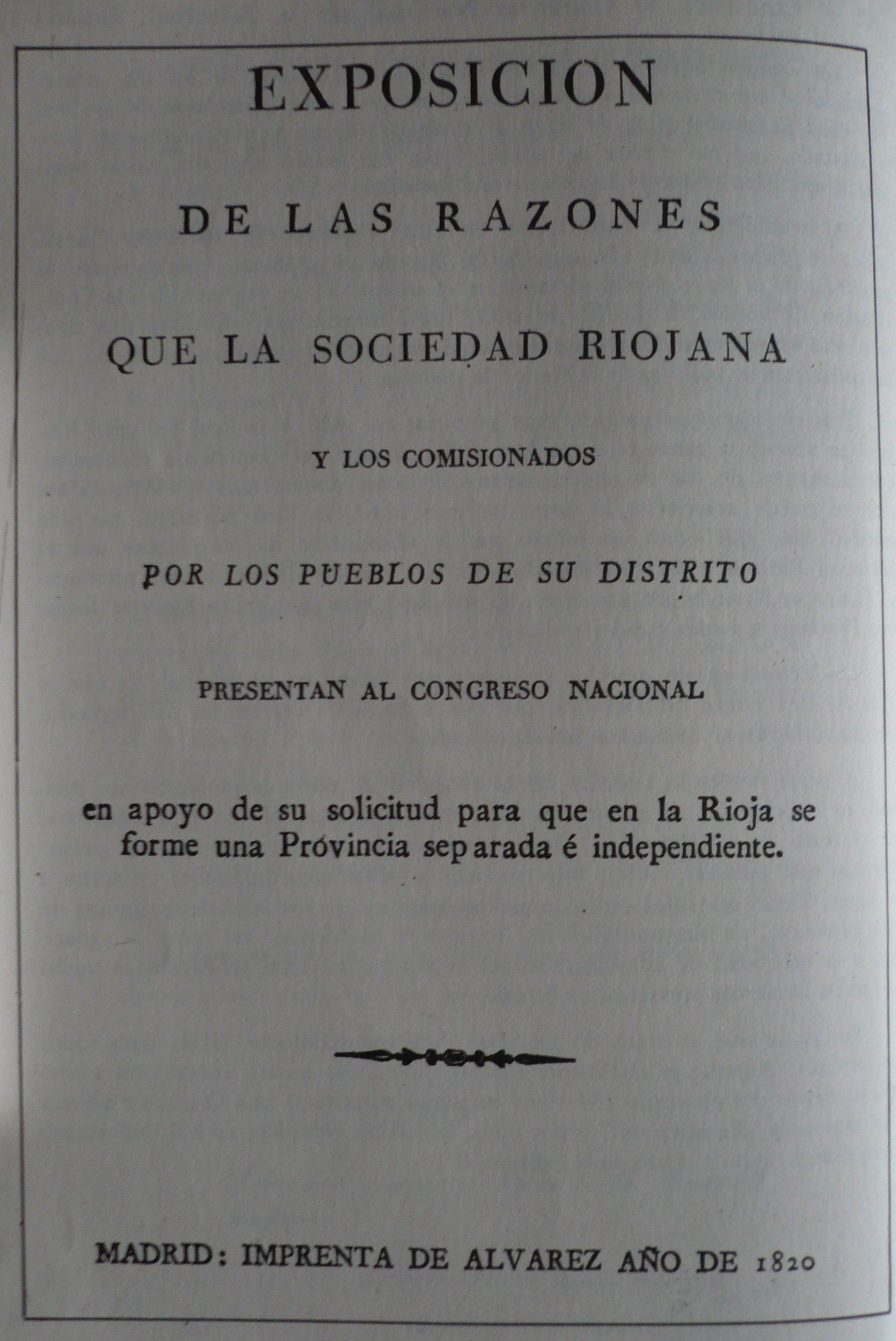
Cover of the document sent by the Sociedad Riojana de Amigos del País to the national congress requesting that a separate and independent province be formed in La Rioja, 1820.

In 1827, Sebastián Miñano published his Diccionario Geográfico Estadístico de España y Portugal (Geographical and Statistical Dictionary of Spain and Portugal) in which he alphabetically reviews each town, city or territory. In volume VII there is a section dedicated to La Rioja in which, after delimiting it, he says: "In these four limits is the source, course and end of the seven rivers whose origins and formation will eternally distinguish the territory of La Rioja from all the other Spanish provinces ....." and reasons: "It is therefore one of the districts best provided by nature to form a separate province with its own government and administration".

In 1826, a new project of provincial division into 49 districts was designed, which remained in abeyance and without any change until 1829. The most significant feature of this project was the recovery of the historical names of Asturias, La Rioja and La Mancha, as well as those of the four foral provinces. However, at some point in the processing of the project it was decided to suppress the traditional names of Asturias, La Rioja and La Mancha, which would adopt the names of their capitals, retaining only those of the Basque provinces, Navarre and the archipelagos. As a result, in 1833, with the death of Ferdinand VII, a new provincial division was approved and the province of La Rioja was reinstated, although it received the name of Logroño and lost some of its territories to neighboring provinces. When Javier de Burgos, in charge of promoting the Spanish territorial administrative division, became Minister of Public Works, the plan for the division into 49 provinces that would be approved in 1833 was almost finished. The only change he apparently introduced in this area was the suppression of the name of La Rioja and its replacement by the name of its capital, which finally became the province of Logroño.

Despite the elimination of the traditional name of La Rioja and its replacement by that of the provincial capital, this name was never lost, so that it continued to be used by its own inhabitants who distinguished between Logroño –which was the capital– and Rioja, the whole territory. Even provincial institutions and media carried the name of La Rioja or its demonym and not that of Logroño, such as the newspaper La Rioja (1889), the Diario de La Rioja (1900), the Ateneo Riojano (1922) or the Instituto de Estudios Riojanos (1946). In 1846 Ángel Casimiro de Govantes published his book entitled Diccionario Geográfico-Histórico de España, por la Real Academia de la Historia. Sección II. Comprende La Rioja o toda la provincia de Logroño y algunos pueblos de la de Burgos,, where the title itself expresses what is meant by Rioja. In 1869 Waldo Giménez Romera published his Crónica de la provincia de Logroño in the Crónica General de España where he said that the province was "what is commonly known by the name of La Rioja". In 1873 Salustiano Olózaga wrote an article entitled La mujer de Logroño. La Riojana which would appear in the general volumes on "Las mujeres españolas, portuguesas y americanas" published in Spain at that time and in which he pointed out that he was not referring to women from Logroño in particular but in general to all women from La Rioja.

Until the transition there were two attempts to change the official name of the province of Logroño to La Rioja, which was popularly used. The first attempt took place in 1929, at the initiative of Diego Ochagavía, then secretary of the Chamber of Commerce, and the other took place during the Second Republic, at the hands of the political party Acción Riojana in 1931. However, there were also various claims for it through the Riojan media. Thus, in 1967, the lawyer Santiago Coello Cuadrado wrote two articles in the newspaper Nueva Rioja complaining about its elimination during the provincial division of 1833, which ended up giving the name of Logroño to the whole territory and eliminating the historical name of Rioja. Also in 1971, José María Lope Toledo, director of the aforementioned newspaper, wrote an article entitled La Rioja. Una Lanza por la denominación in which he asks in his words, "Why is our province not called LA RIOJA, by its authentic name, as it has been called for centuries?" Historians such as Merino Urrutia, Alfredo Gil del Río or Luis Gato answered the same question, showing a favorable opinion. The name of La Rioja was also claimed at a national meeting of the Carlist Party, then outlawed, held in 1968 in the monastery of Valvanera, the place where the patron saint of La Rioja is venerated.

With the Spanish transition and the beginning of democracy, the name of La Rioja was claimed again, a demand that came first from the civil society of the province. Thus, many people began to write articles and letters to the editor to local newspapers asking: "How is it possible that our province is not called La Rioja when we all call it that?" Jesús Victoriano wrote one of them to the newspaper Nueva Rioja expressing this common thought as follows: "... to erase its own idiosyncrasy [that of La Rioja] its historical name was officially erased and a "Logroño" was created that only the people of Logroño represent... I wish it were the King who, on his eager visit to La Rioja, would call us and make us call ourselves by our own name: RIOJANOS. We would feel as grateful as the Catalans and Galicians to speak to them in their own language". In 1976 the aforementioned newspaper carried out a survey among the population of the province asking if "The name of the province should be changed: Logroño or Rioja? It also asked whether Riojanos had a different personality from Basques, Aragonese or Castilians. The great majority of those consulted were in favor of changing the name, only the Mayor of the capital was against it. Furthermore, the majority of those surveyed said that La Rioja had a unique personality, different from that of the surrounding regions.

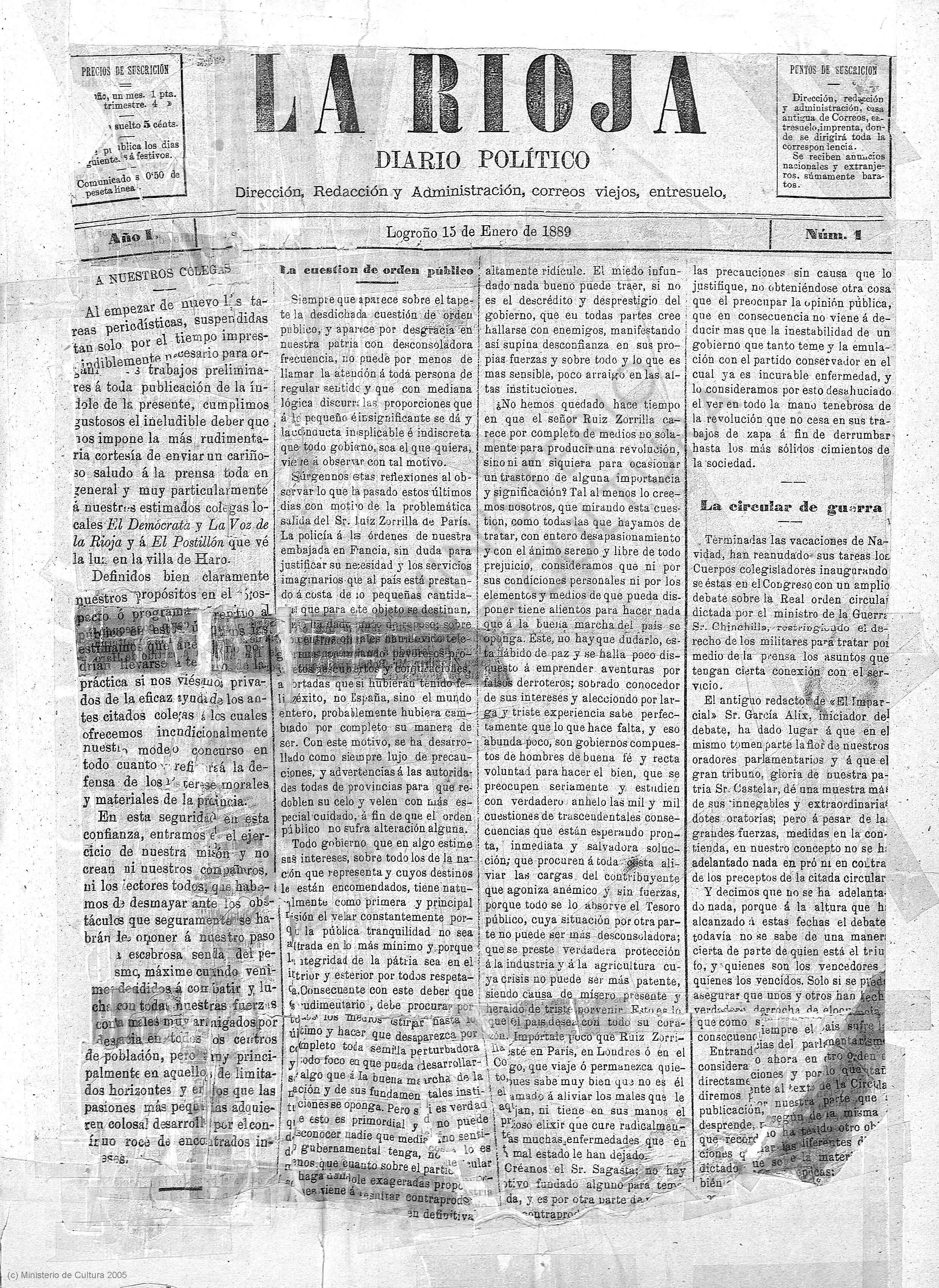
First issue of the regional newspaper La Rioja, year 1889. In 1938, during the Spanish Civil War, Franco decreed its merger with the other newspaper of the province called Diario de La Rioja (1900) and changed its name to Nueva Rioja. In 1981 it would be renamed again La Rioja.

Gradually, politicians began to echo the popular claims, demanding a change in the name of the province. In 1977, the president of the Provincial Council, Julio Luis Fernández Sevilla, after consulting the official chronicler of the province and the civil associations that demanded the change, organized a debate on the subject with all the parliamentarians and provincial deputies. Two points were unanimously agreed upon: The first point, in his words, was: "A request to the government that this land, once and for all, be called by its historical name: Rioja, reserving the name of Logroño exclusively for the capital". The beginning of the procedures for the change of name was agreed at a plenary session held on 22 July of the same year.

Once the legal procedures were initiated, there was no law in existence at that time regarding the change of name of the provinces, so another law had to be used for the modification of the name of the municipalities. This law required, among other things, a report, a historical study and a favorable opinion from the Royal Academy of History. Thus, in accordance with it, the civil government, at the request of the Ministry of the Interior, requested a report and opinion from four academic institutions: the Instituto de Estudios Riojanos, the Sociedad Geográfica, the Servicio Provincial de Inspección y Asesoramiento de Corporaciones Locales and the aforementioned Royal Academy of History. All of them were in favor of the change, only that of the Geographic Society remained in a stalemate after requesting a scientific commission that was never formed. The provinces of Santander and Oviedo followed the same procedure for the modification of their names. Finally, after complying with the requirements, on September 12, 1980, the Congress of Deputies approved the Senate bill by which the province of Logroño was renamed the Province of La Rioja. On November 15, 1980, Law 57/1980 on the change of name was enacted. In this way, the province recovered its historical name of La Rioja, which had been read so many times in the documentation since medieval times. Two years later, in 1982, its statute of autonomy was approved and it was constituted as such with the corresponding self-government.

=== In the province of Alava ===
In the province of Álava there is a region located to the south of the same one and conformed by 23 towns, geographically located between the mountain range of Cantabria and the river Ebro, which receives the name of Rioja Alavesa or cuadrilla de Laguardia.

In medieval times this territory was not called by the name it is given today, but on the contrary was included under the term of Sonsierra de Navarra, constituting most of it. It was not until the modern era that the name Rioja –originating on the opposite bank of the river Ebro– spread to this area and the area began to be designated by this name, especially the social links between the two banks of the Ebro which generated the expansion of the toponymic name.

The oldest document found in which the term Rioja Alavesa appears dates from the 18th century and is the map entitled mapa de La Rioja dividida en Alta y Baja con la parte de la Sonsierra que llaman comunmente Rioja Alavesa, by Tomás López, dated 1769. Immediately after this, it appears in the title of another document published by the Real Sociedad Bascongada de Amigos del País, called Estado de la Rioja Alavesa, dated 1771 and written by Félix María Sánchez de Samaniego, a native of the area, who does not give it this title nor does it reflect the composite toponym anywhere in it. In any case, it can be deduced from the old texts that the name Rioja Alavesa at this time was still in the minority, but it was later reaffirmed and ended up almost completely replacing the term Sonsierra.

The term Rioja Alavesa also appears in other documents such as the Diccionario Geográfico-histórico de España by the Real Academia de la Historia. Sección I, que comprende el Reyno de Navarra, Señorío de Vizcaya y Provincias de Álava y Guipúzcoa del año 1802 or in the Diccionario geográfico-estadístico-histórico de España y sus posesiones de Ultramar published between 1845 and 1850 by Pascual Madoz, in which, referring to the harvests of the province of Álava, he states that "the oil harvest is medium in the Rioja Alavesa, the only place where this fruit is gathered".

=== In the province of Almeria ===
In the province of Almería there is a village called Rioja at the end of Pechina. Nearby there is also a toponym Rioja called Baños de Alfaro. There is also a farmhouse with this name in Cuevas de Almanzora.

According to a study by the Almerian historian José A. Tapia —quoted in full by the researcher Merino Urrutia in one of his works carried out in 1968— the reason why the municipality of this province have the name Rioja is that at the time of the Christian conquest of the Emirate of Granada some local place names in Arabic were replaced by others in Castilian due to the difficulty of pronunciation for the new settlers. In this way, the Christian landowner who settled in these lands from the year 1500 would give the current name to the village. The oldest documents studied by Tapia in which reference is made to this locality come from the 16th century, sometimes being named Pago de Rioja. Thus, in one of them dated 1530, a certain "Francisco de Logroño en el pago de Rioja" is mentioned, who was a master of the cathedral of Almería and tenant of estates in the pago. It would be this Francisco, a native of Logroño or a relative of his who, out of nostalgia for the land of his birth, gave the locality the name of his region of origin. The nearby toponym Baños de Alfaro, also from La Rioja, could have the same origin.

== Bibliography ==
- Abad León, Felipe (1994). De La Rioja española a La Rioja argentina (in Spanish). Ochoa. ISBN 84-7359-412-6.
- Abad León, Felipe (1980). La Rioja provincia y región de España (in Spanish). Ochoa. ISBN 84-7359-088-0.
- Aguirre González, Jesús Vicente (2000). La Rioja empieza a caminar (PDF) (in Spanish). Ochoa. ISBN 9788473595100. Archived from the original (PDF) on November 30, 2016.
- Albia de Castro, Fernando (1633). Memorial y discurso político por la... ciudad de Logroño para que tenga efecto la merced que el Rey Don Ioan Segundo... (in Spanish) (Lorenço Craesbeeck ed.).
- Andrés Cabello, Sergio (October 21, 2007). "Los Olvidados". Diario La Rioja.
- Andrés Cabello, Sergio (2006). "8 de octubre de 1978. "Todos a Nájera"". Belezos. ISSN 1886-4333.
- Anguiano Nieva, Mateo (1701). Compendio Historial de la Provincia de La Rioja (in Spanish) (Juan García Infanzón ed.). pp. 170–171.
- Aznar Martínez, Eduardo (2017). Tierras, gentes y voces. El legado del euskera riojano (in Spanish). Pamiela. ISBN 978-84-9172-006-5. Archived from the original on January 7, 2018.
- Aznar Martínez, Eduardo (2011). El euskera en La Rioja. Primeros testimonios (in Spanish). Pamiela. ISBN 9788476816684.
- Aznar Martínez, Eduardo (2010). La Rioja, origen y etimología de un nombre controvertido.
- "Edición electrónica del Becerro Galicano de San Millán de la Cogolla".
- Bermejo Martín, Francisco (2013). La Rioja contemporánea. Compendio historial (1784-1996) (in Spanish). F. Bermejo. ISBN 978-84-616-7931-7.
- Burgueño Rivero, Jesús (2011). La invención de las provincias (in Spanish). Catarata. ISBN 978-84-8319-576-5.
- Burgueño Rivero, Jesús (1995). "Euskadi, Navarra y La Rioja en la reordenación provincial del Estado (1800-1850)". Lurralde: Investigación y espacio. ISSN 0211-5891.
- Cabrejas, Enrique (June 14, 2017). "¿Por qué se llama La Rioja?". Rioja2.
- Castro, Juan de (1688). El glorioso thaumaturgo español redemptor de cautiuos Spto Domingo de Sylos, hijo del patriarca San Benito... (in Spanish) (Melchor Alvarez ed.). Madrid.
- Corral, Alonso del (1649). Istoria de la vida y milagros del glorioso S[ant]o Domingo, abbad de Silos, natural de la pronvicia de la Rioja (in Spanish). Manuscrito.
- Delgado Idarreta, José Miguel (2000). "Introducción a la historia de la Comunidad Autónoma de La Rioja". Berceo: 239–264. ISBN 84-89362-82-3.
- s.n. (1678). "Descripción de la casa de San Meder". Biblioteca virtual de la Real Academia de la historia.
- Díez Morrás, Francisco Javier (2022). "1. La Rioja: origen de una región, delimitación de un territorio.". El nacimiento de la provincia de Logroño. Hacia la construcción de La Rioja contemporánea (in Spanish). Instituto de Estudios Riojanos. ISBN 978-84-9960-156-4.
- Díez Morrás, Javier (June 9, 2019). "Y La Rioja se hizo provincia". Diario La Rioja. pp. 2–3.
- Dutton, Brian (1984). La vida de San Millán de la Cogolla de Gonzalo de Berceo (in Spanish). Támesis. ISBN 0729301923.
- Fernández de Navarrete, Martín (July 31, 2018). "¿Por qué nuestra provincia se llamó Logroño y no La Rioja?". Rioja2.
- Fuentelapeña, Antonio de. El ente dilucidado : discurso vnico nouissiº q[ue] muestra ay en naturala. animales irracionales inuisibles y quales (in Spanish) (Impra. Real ed.). Madrid.
- García Prado, Justiniano (1983). "La Rioja. Región, provincia y Comunidad Autónoma". Historia de La Rioja. Prehistoria - Protohistoria. Edad Antigua. Caja de Ahorros de La Rioja. pp. 40–44. ISBN 84-7231-901-6.
- Garibay y Zamalloa, Esteban de (1571). Los XI libros d'el compendio historial de las chronicas y vniuersal historia de todos los reynos de España (in Spanish). Christophoro Plantino.
- Giménez Romera, Waldo (1867). Crónica de la provincia de Logroño (in Spanish) (Editores Rubio y Compañía ed.). Madrid: Editores Rubio y Compañía.
- González de Tejada, José (1702). Historia de Santo Domingo de la Calzada, Abraham de La Rioja (in Spanish). Melchor Alvarez's widow.
- Govantes, Ángel Casimiro de (1986) [1846]. "Sección II. Comprende La Rioja o Toda la Provincia de Logroño y algunos pueblos de la de Burgos. RIOJA (LA)". Diccionario geográfico-estadístico-histórico de España (Real Academia de la Historia ed.). Madrid: Imprenta de los Sres. Viuda de Jordan e Hijos. ISBN 84-505-3985-4. Archived from the original on 2021-09-23.
- Granado Hijelmo, Ignacio (1996). "La Comunidad Autónoma de La Rioja en el proceso autonómico español (1975-1996)". Simposio de Historia Actual. ISBN 84-89362-14-9.
- Granado Hijelmo, Ignacio (1993). "2.2 El nombre de "La Rioja"". La Rioja como sistema (in Spanish). Vol. III. Gobierno de La Rioja. pp. 1700–1712. ISBN 84-8125-033-3.
- Izquierdo Vozmediano, Marcelino (September 27, 2017). "¿Cómo era La Rioja hace 150 años?". Diario La Rioja.
- Izquierdo Vozmediano, Marcelino (2009). "Diario La Rioja cumple 120 años, o cuando la historia se escribe día a día". Belezos. ISSN 1886-4333.
- López de Vargas, Tomás (1769). "Mapa de La Rioja dividida en Alta y Baja". Biblioteca virtual del Patrimonio bibliográfico.
- Miñano y Bedolla, Sebastián (1828). Diccionario geográfico-estadístico de España y Portugal (in Spanish) (Imprenta de Pierart-Peralta ed.). Madrid.
- Merino Urrutia, José Juan Bautista (1968). El Río Oja y su comarca (in Spanish). Diputación Provincial de Logroño.
- Merino Urrutia, José Juan Bautista (1958). "El vascuence en La Rioja y Burgos". Revista Berceo (46): 90. ISSN 0210-8550.
- Murillo Velarde, Pedro (1752). Geographia historica, de Castilla la Vieja, Aragon, Cathaluña, Navarra, Portugal, y otras provincias : con un... (in Spanish). in the office of D. Gabriel Ramirez..., in Calle de Atocha, in front of Trinidad Calzada: D. Gabriel Ramirez.
- Ocampo, Florian de (1553). Los cinco libros primeros de la Cronica general de España (in Spanish).
- Officina de Juan Blaeu, Joan Blaeu (1672). Parte del Atlas Mayor o Geographia Blaviana Que contiene las Cartas y Descripciones de Españas (in Spanish) (Officina de Juan Blaeu ed.). Amsterdam.
- Ramírez Pascual, Tomás (2005). "La Rioja. Etimología y origen". Berceo.
- Rittwagen, Guillermo (1921). "La influencia vasca en La Rioja". Estudios sobre La Rioja (in Spanish). Real Sociedad Geográfica, 1921 (Imp. del Patronato de Huérfanos de Intendencia e Intervención Militares). pp. 16–18.
- Sainz, Jonás (September 18, 2019). "El primer mapa de La Rioja tiene 250 años". Diario La Rioja.
- Salarrullana de Verda, Pilar (1999). En el nombre de La Rioja (in Spanish). Instituto de Estudios Riojanos. ISBN 84-89362-53-X.
- Simón Díaz, José (1953). "Prólogo y notas". Edición fascimil del Memorial y Discurso Político por la muy Noble y Muy Leal Ciudad de Logroño (in Spanish). Instituto de Estudios Riojanos.
- Somalo, C. (April 21, 2006). "Rioja: Tierra de riachuelos-- rivalia-rialia-riolia". Diario La Rioja.
- Viguera Ruiz, Rebeca (2012). La Convención de Santa Coloma de 1812. Historia de una reivindicación liberal de la identidad riojana (in Spanish). Instituto de Estudios Riojanos. ISBN 978-84-9960-041-3.
