= Berones =

Pre-Roman people of the Iberian peninsula

The Iberian Peninsula in the 3rd century BC.

The Berones were a pre-Roman Celtic people of ancient Spain, although they were not part of the Celtiberians. They lived north of the latter and close to the Cantabrian Conisci in the middle Ebro region between the Tirón and Alhama rivers.

== Origins ==
The ancestors of the Berones were Celts who migrated from Gaul to the Iberian Peninsula around the 4th century BC, to settle in La Rioja and the southern parts of the Soria, Álava and Navarre provinces.

== Location ==
The extent of the Berones people is shown in light green. In other colours, the extent of the Celtiberians.

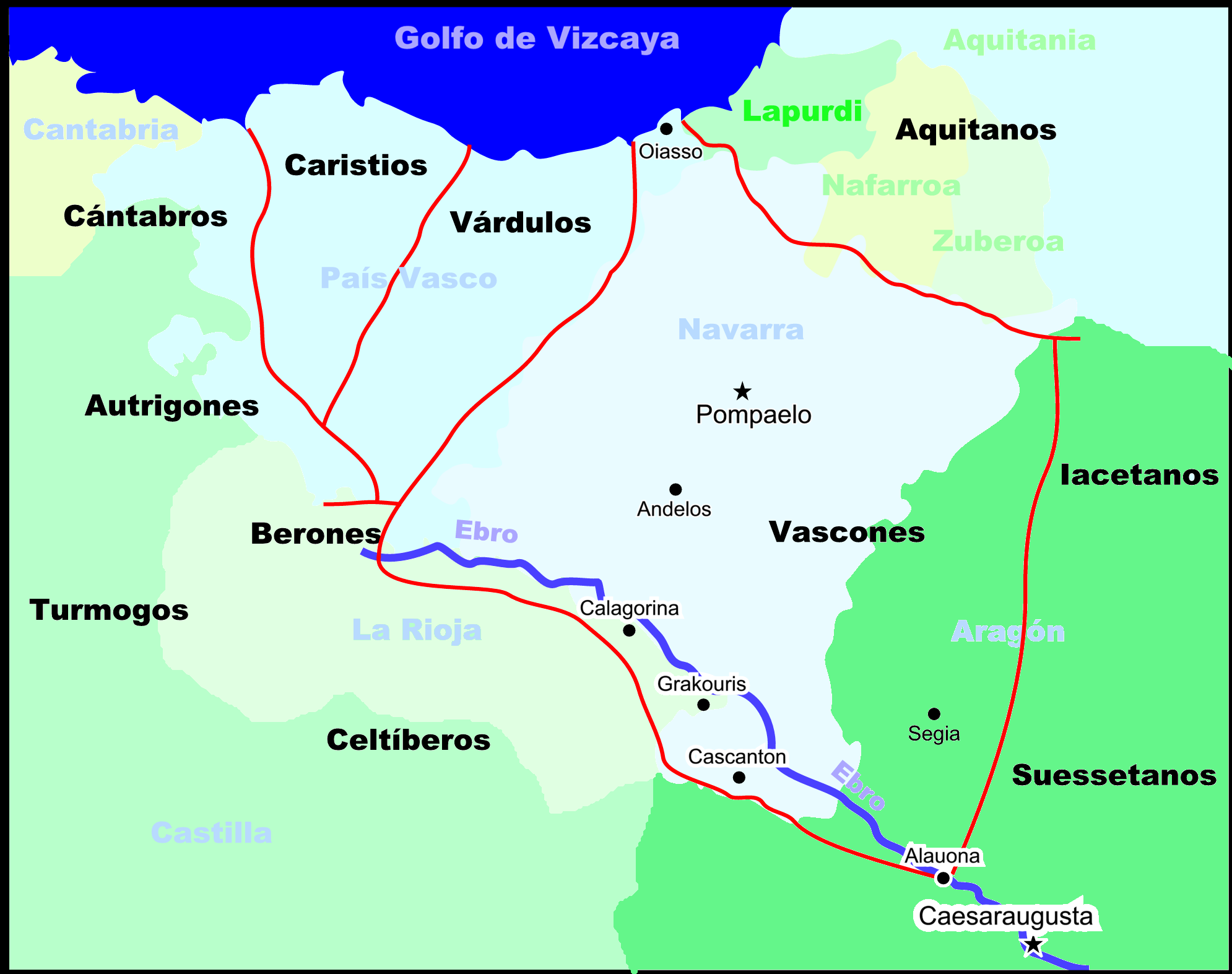
The Berones territory and their neighbors

A stock-raising people that practiced transhumance, their capital was Varia or Vareia (La Custodia de Viana; Celtiberian-type mint: Uaracos Auta?), situated near Logroño at the middle Ebro in La Rioja. and controlled the towns of Libia (either Herramélluri or Leiva – La Rioja), Tritium Megallum (Tricio – La Rioja), Bilibium (Bilibio, near Conchas de Haro – La Rioja) and Contrebia Leukade (Aguillar del Rio Alhama – La Rioja).

== History ==
Allies of the Autrigones, the Berones appear to have kept themselves out of the Celtiberian confederacy throughout the 3rd-2nd centuries BC but later came under pressure of the Vascones. Their earliest contact with Rome might have occurred during the early 2nd century BC, when they allegedly fought as allies of the Celtiberians at the battle of Calagurris in 186 BC, being defeated by the Praetor of Hispania Citerior Lucius Manlius Adicinus Fulvianus.

According to a Roman epigraphic source, the Ascoli-Picenum bronze (ILS 8888, now at the Museo Capitolino, Rome), a few Beronian mercenary cavalrymen later entered Roman service during the Social War (91–88 BC), fighting alongside other Spaniards in the Turma Saluitana as auxiliary cavalry under proconsul Gnaeus Pompeius Strabo in Italy. Later during the Sertorian Wars, the Berones sided with Pompey and subsequently aided their Autrigones' allies in their attempt to stave off Sertorius' incursion into their respective territories of northern Celtiberia in 76 BC, which resulted in the brutal sacking and destruction of the Berones' own capital Vareia by the sertorian troops in retaliation.

The Berones disappear as an independent people in the classical sources in about 72 BC, after the end of the Sertorian Wars, although some towns maintained their culture for a certain time due to a late Romanization.

== See also ==
- Celtiberian confederacy
- Celtiberian script
- Celtiberian Wars
- Lusones
- Sertorian Wars
- Pre-Roman peoples of the Iberian Peninsula
