= Tirón River =

River in Spain

Coordinates: 42°34′43″N 2°50′26″W

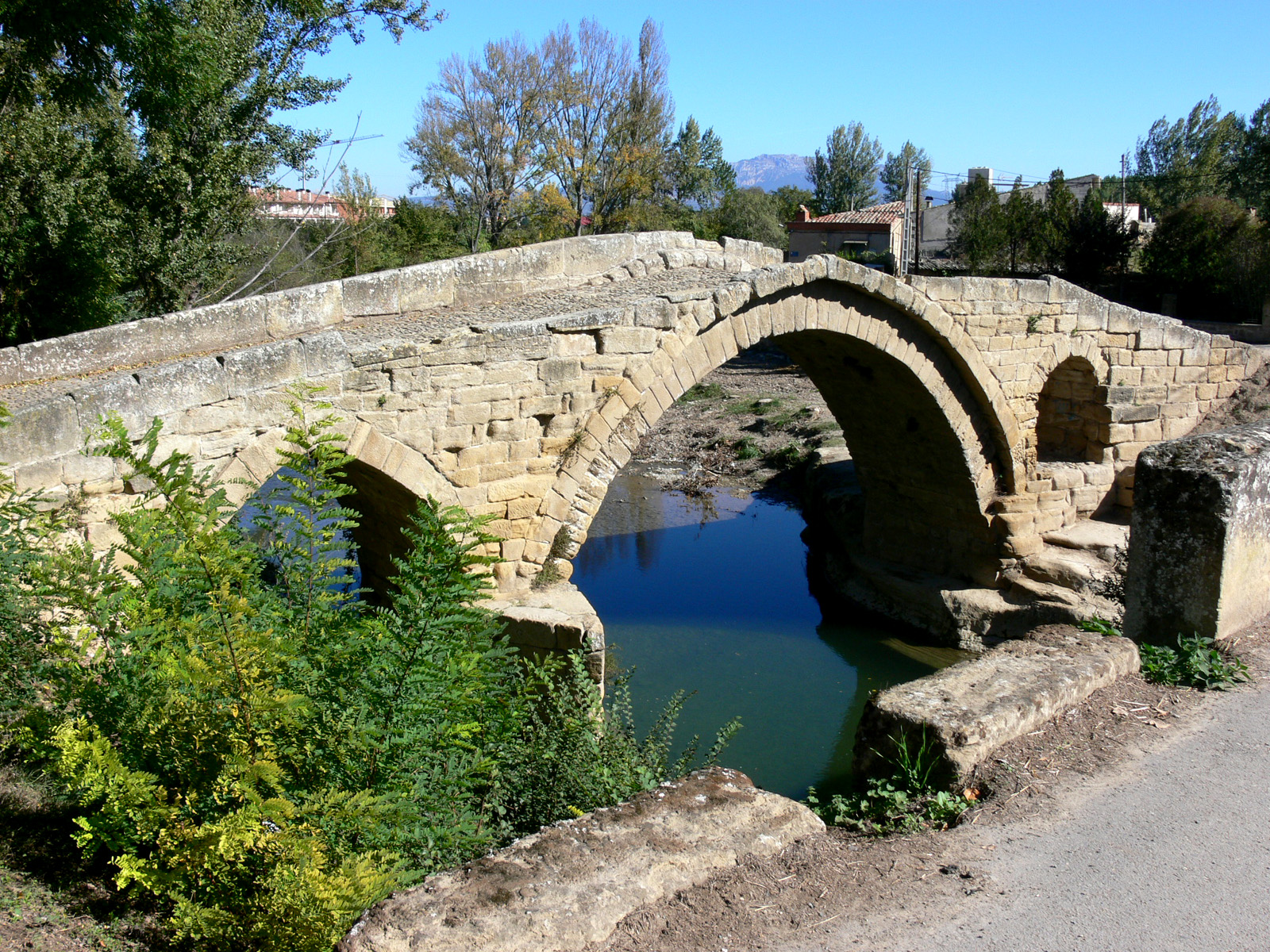
Romanesque bridge over the Tirón in Cihuri

The Tirón is a river in central-northern Spain in the provinces La Rioja, Burgos and Castile and León. Its length is 65 kilometres. Its source is in Sierra de la Demanda. The Tirón's longest tributary is the Oja, and it flows into the Ebro north east of Haro.

In April 2015, anti-erosion work was established in Herramélluri; its cost was 221,000 euro.
