= Nestares =

- Municipality
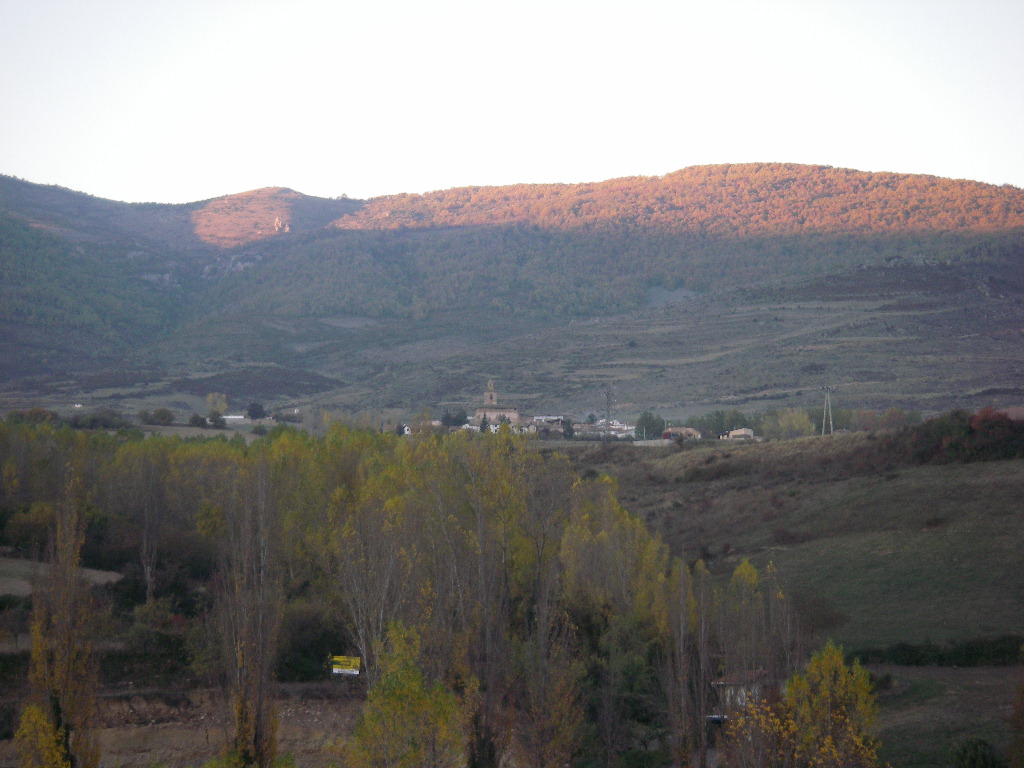
- Skyline of Nestares

- Coat of arms

- Location within La Rioja, Spain Location within Spain
- Coordinates: 42°16′10″N 2°37′09″W
- Country: Spain
- Autonomous community: La Rioja
- Comarca: Camero Nuevo

Government
  - Mayor: Francisco Javier Hurtado Justo (PSOE)

Area
  - Total: 21.61 km^{2} (8.34 sq mi)
- Elevation: 861 m (2,825 ft)

Population (2025-01-01)
  - Total: 85
- Demonym(s): nestariego, ga
- Postal code: 26110
- Website: Official website

Nestares is a village in the province and autonomous community of La Rioja, Spain. The municipality covers an area of 21.61 square kilometres (8.34 sq mi) and as of 2011 had a population of 81 people.
