= Gallinero de Cameros =

- Municipality
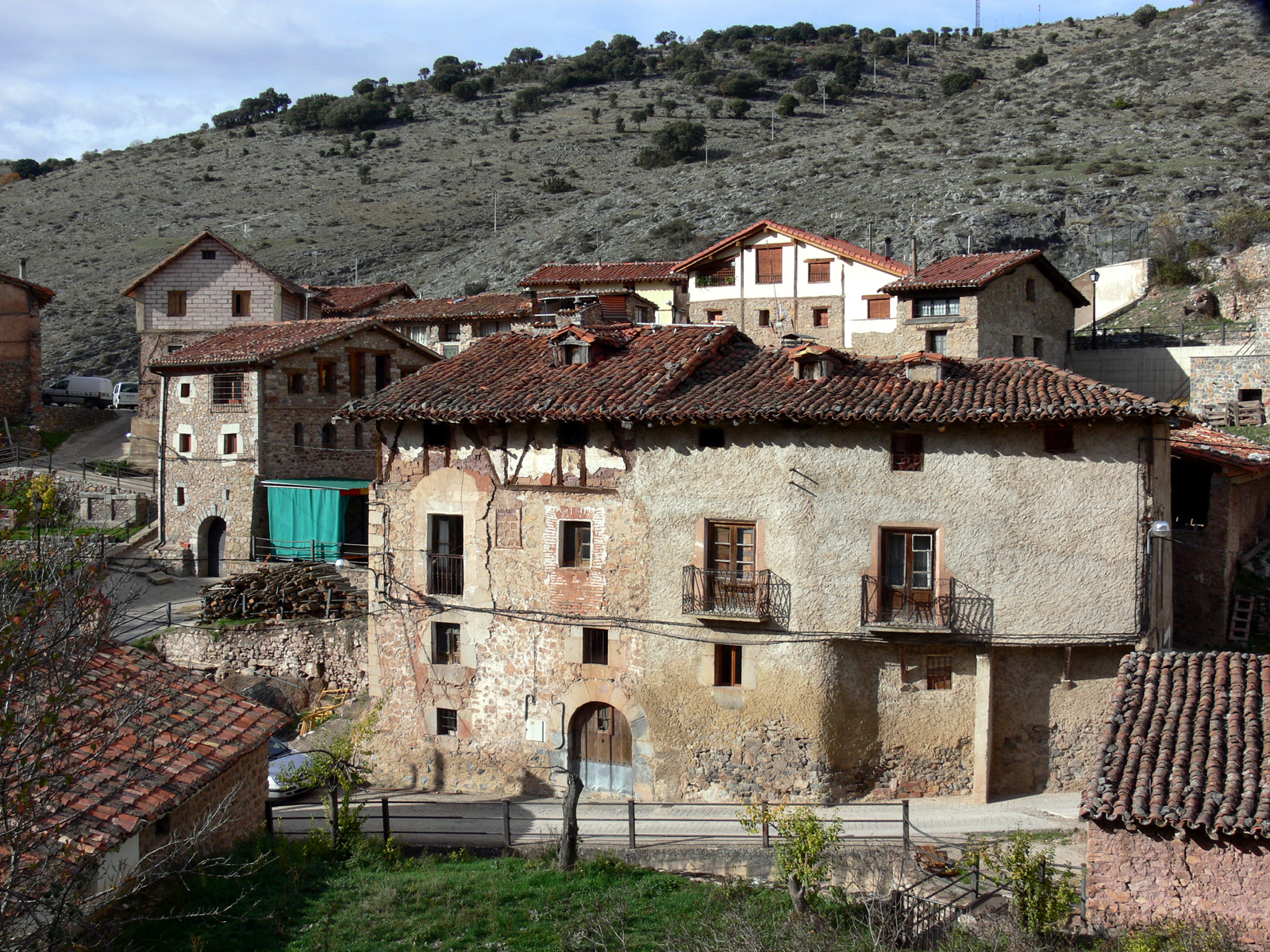
- Skyline of Gallinero de Cameros

- Location within La Rioja, Spain Location within Spain
- Coordinates: 42°10′20″N 2°37′04″W
- Country: Spain
- Autonomous community: La Rioja
- Comarca: Camero Nuevo

Government
  - Mayor: Miguel Ángel Gómez de Pedro (PP)

Area
  - Total: 11.17 km^{2} (4.31 sq mi)
- Elevation: 1,060 m (3,480 ft)

Population (2025-01-01)
  - Total: 16
- Demonym: gallinerense
- Postal code: 26122
- Website: Official website

Gallinero de Cameros is a village in the province and autonomous community of La Rioja, Spain. The municipality covers an area of 11.17 square kilometres (4.31 sq mi) and as of 2011 had a population of 26 people.
