= Pedroso, La Rioja =

Pedroso
- Municipality
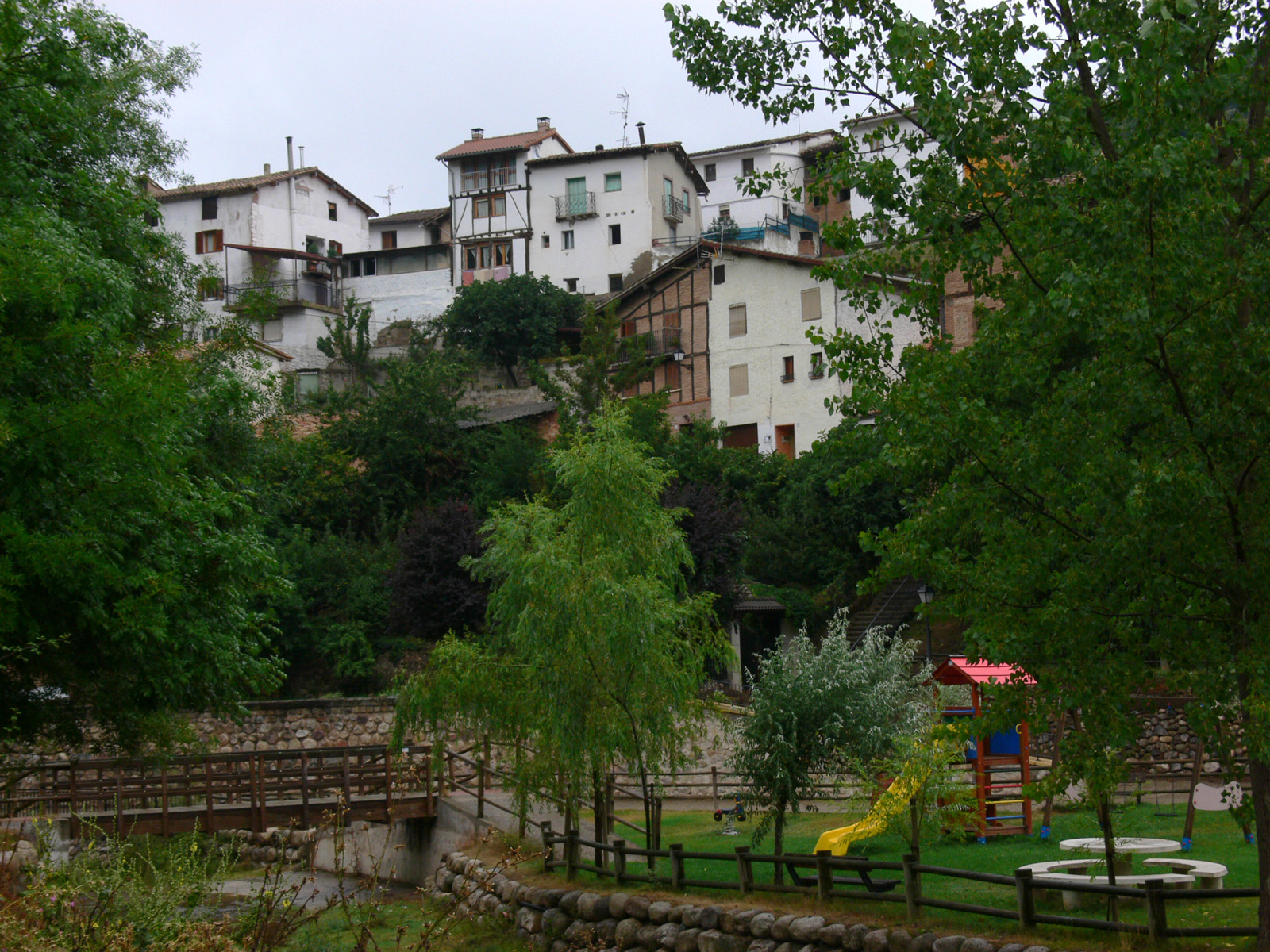

- Location within La Rioja, Spain Location within Spain
- Coordinates: 42°18′1″N 2°43′7″W
- Country: Spain
- Autonomous community: La Rioja
- Comarca: Anguiano

Government
  - Mayor: Eduardo Alonso Nájera (PSOE)

Area
  - Total: 19.29 km^{2} (7.45 sq mi)
- Elevation: 773 m (2,536 ft)

Population (2025-01-01)
  - Total: 89
  - Density: 4.6/km^{2} (12/sq mi)
- Demonym(s): pedrosiño, ña
- Time zone: UTC+1 (CET)
  - Summer (DST): UTC+2 (CET)
- Website: www.aytopedroso.org

Pedroso, La Rioja is a small village in Spain.
