= Rodrigo Méndez Silva =

Spanish historian

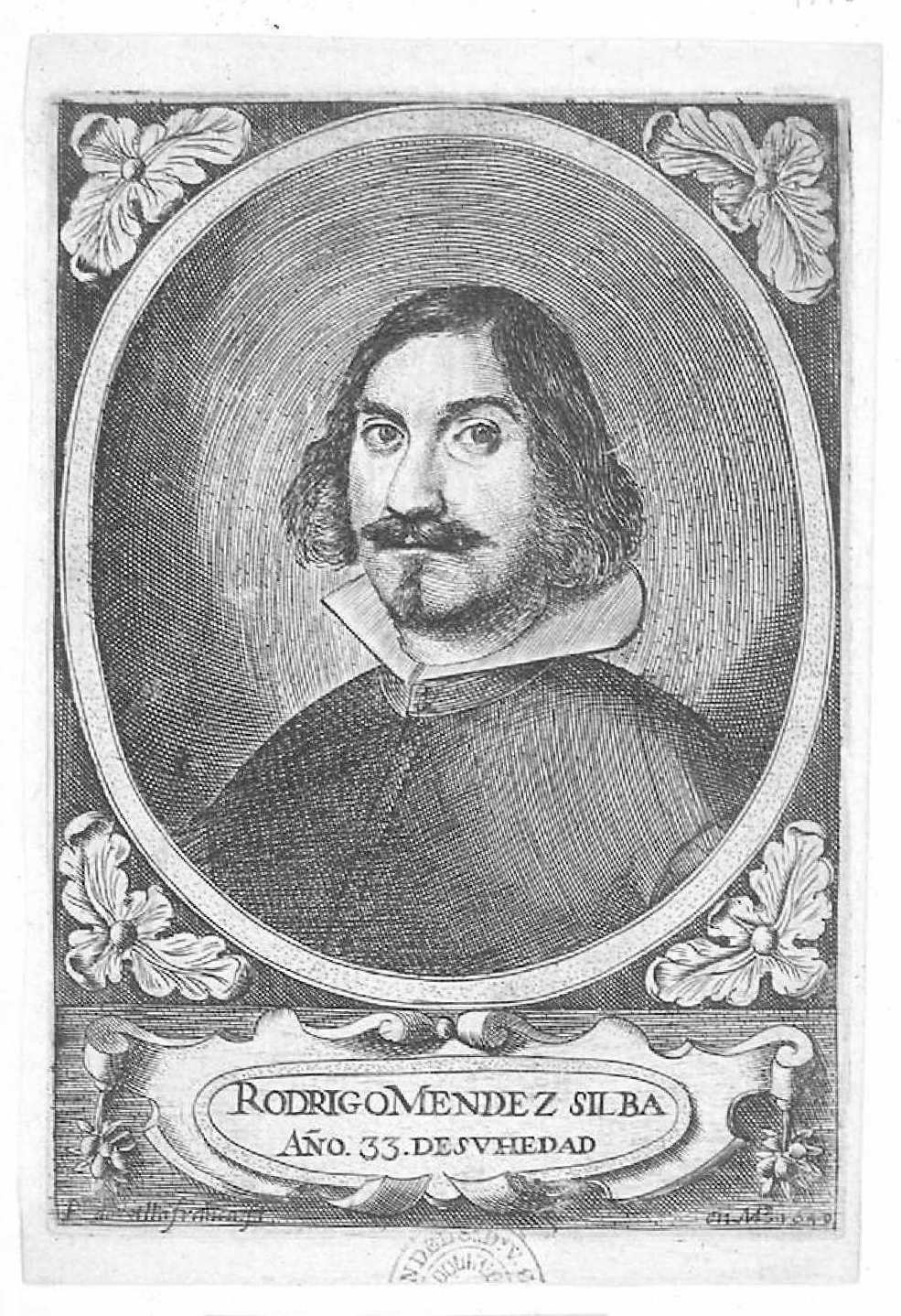
Pedro de Villafranca-retrato de Rodrigo Méndez Silva

Rodrigo Méndez Silva (1606–1670) was a Spanish historian, genealogist, geographer and writer.

== Works ==
- Catálogo real genealógico de España: ascendencias y descendencias de nuestros Catolicos Principes y Monarcas Supremos..., Madrid, 1637; 2.ª edición Madrid: Diego Diaz de la Carrera, 1639; 3.ª MAdrid: Impr. de Doña Mariana de Valle; 4.ª Madrid, 1675.
- Población general de España. Madrid, 1645.
- Engaños y desengaños del mundo, Madrid, 1655.
- Parangón de los Cromueles de Inglaterra, Madrid, 1657 (dos impressiones).
- Le saette di Gionata scagliate a favor degli ebrei (Venecia, 1703)
- Memorial de la antigua, y noble familia de los Gonzalez de Sepulveda. [Madrid : s.n.], 1655.
- Ascendencia ilustre, gloriosos hechos y posteridad noble del famoso Nuño Alfonso, alcaide de la imperial ciudad de Toledo y príncipe de su milicia, ricohome de Castilla Madrid: por Domingo Garcia y Morrás, 1648.
- Admirable vida, y heroycas virtudes de ... la esclarecida emperatriz María Madrid: por Diego Diaz de la Carrera, 1655.
- Vida y hechos heroicos del gran Condestable de Portugal D. Nuño Aluarez Pereyra Conde de Barcelos. de Orem. de Arroyolos. Mayordomo. Mayor del Rey Don Iuan el primeiro: con los Arboles y decendencias de los Emperadores, Reyes, Príncipes, Potentados, Duq[ue]s Marqueses, y Condes que del se deriuan, al Ex.mo S.or D. Luiz Mendez de Haro Sotomayor Guzman Conde de Morente gentil hombre de la camara de su Magestad catholica Phelipe IV el grande, caballero de la Orden militar de Santiago. Madrid: por Juan Sánchez, a costa de Pedro Coelho, mercader de libros, 1640.
- Memorial de las casas del Villar Don Pardo, y Cañete: sus servicios, casamientos, ascendencia, y descendencia... recopilado de los mas clasicos autores, Nobiliarios, Cronicas, Privilegios reales y Testamentos auténticos [Madrid]: Juan Sanches, 1646.
- Compendio de las mas señaladas hazañas que obro el Capitan Alonso de Céspedes, Alcides Castellano... Madrid: por Diego Díaz, 1647.
- Breve, curiosa, y aiustada noticia, de los ayos, y maestros, que hasta oy han tenido los Principes, Infantes, y otras personas reales de Castilla. Madrid: por la viuda del Licenciado Juan Martín del Barrio, 1654.
