= Oja (river) =

River in Spain

Coordinates: 42°34′N 2°55′W

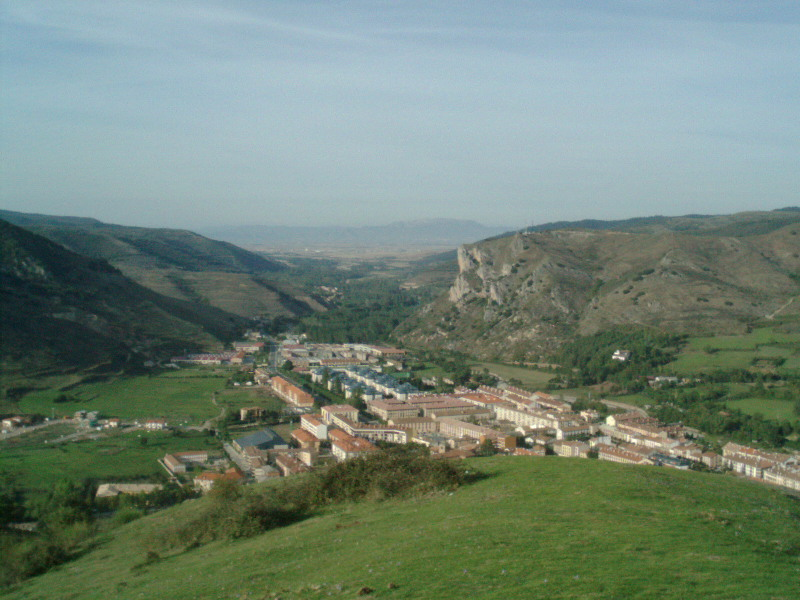
The Rio Oja can be seen below the hill of the Oja Valley flowing past the town of Ezcaray

Rio Oja is a river in the La Rioja province of northern Spain. It flows through the Oja Valley past the town and municipality of Ezcaray. It is generally accepted to have given its name to the famous wine of the Rioja DO, although there are other theories. The Oja flows into the Tirón River east of Cihuri, and the Tirón flows into the Ebro immediately north of Haro.
