= Villalobar de Rioja =

- Municipality
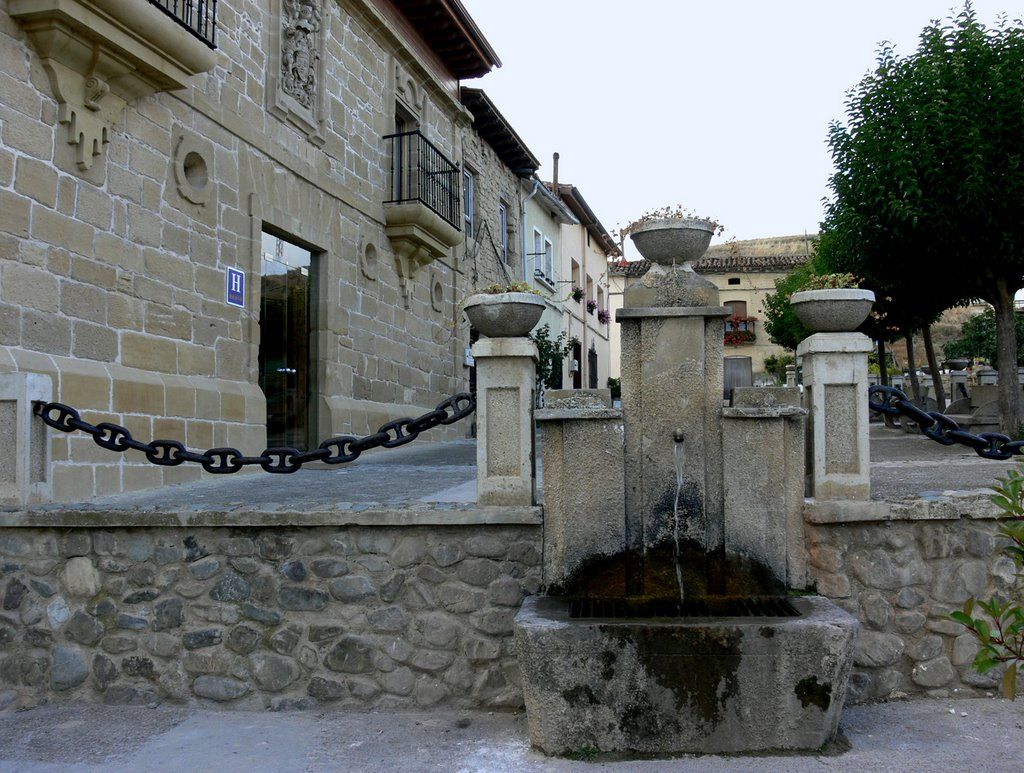
- Plaza de España. Fountain and Hotel El Palacete.

- Location within La Rioja, Spain Location within Spain
- Coordinates: 42°29′31″N 2°57′43″W
- Country: Spain
- Autonomous community: La Rioja
- Comarca: Santo Domingo de la Calzada

Government
  - Mayor: Álvaro Tecedor Rotaeche (PP)

Area
  - Total: 10.94 km^{2} (4.22 sq mi)
- Elevation: 585 m (1,919 ft)

Population (2025-01-01)
  - Total: 84
- Demonym: villalobarense
- Postal code: 26256
- Website: www.villalobarderioja.org

Villalobar de Rioja is a municipality of the Autonomous region of La Rioja (Spain), with no more than 100 inhabitants. It is located in a privileged location between Santo Domingo de la Calzada and Haro.

== Geography ==
It is located in the Oja valley. Agricultural activities are predominant, mostly dryland farming, with the growing of wheat, barley, potato, beet and vegetables.

== History ==
Remains of the old Roman road between Tricio and Briviesca can be found within the city limits. Ancient Romans called the village Alfovare. It appears as Villafavar in a document of the year 1120. Until 23 December 1804 it was a village belonging to Santo Domingo de la Calzada, when Charles IV of Spain granted it the title of independent village.

== Historic buildings and monuments ==
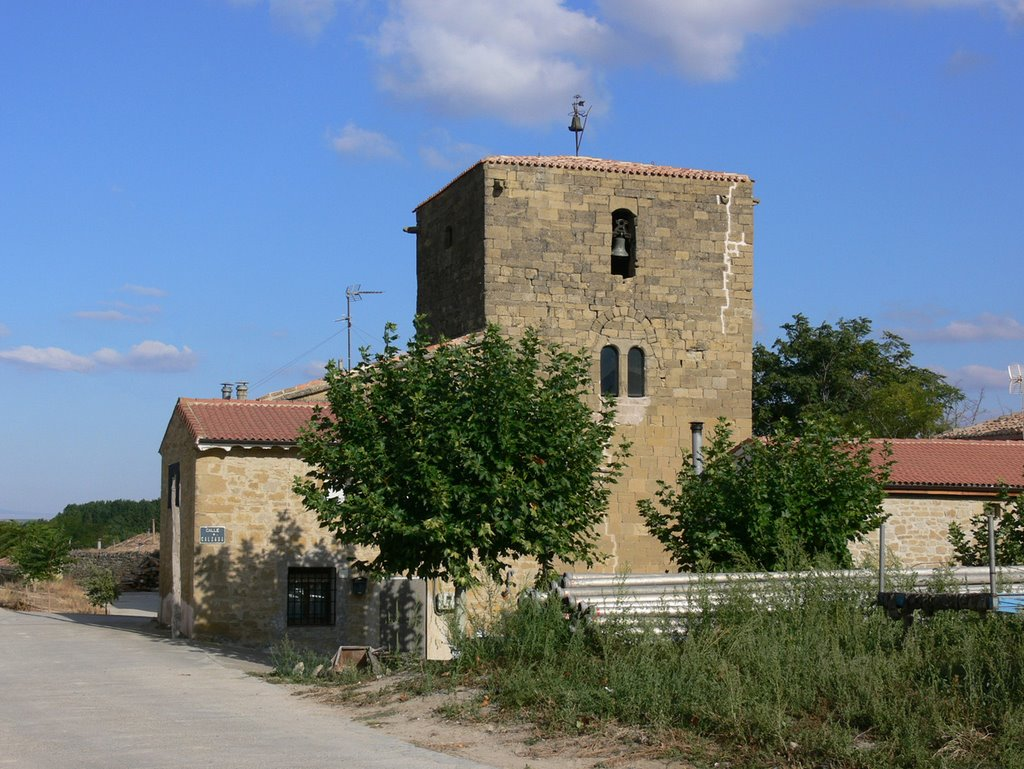
Parish Church of La Asunción

- Parish Church of La Asunción, located on the top of the village. Dates from the end of the 12th and beginning 13th century. The portal is covered with a porch which protects it from erosion. It has four rounded archivolts with small columns and moldings supported by pilasters and L-shaped columns.
- 12th century fortified tower, built with ashlar stones. It has a squared floor and consists of a basement or wine cellar, ground floor and further floor on the top of wooden beams. The interior of the tower has been modified.
- Bustamante mansion. Noble mansion from the beginning of the 17th century, with ashlar stones and the coat of arms of the Bustamante family, considered artistic and musical heritage and referent which was recently converted into a luxury hotel, with hand-painted decorations and rooms of different cultural themes.
- Emblazoned ancestral houses.

== Festivals and traditions ==
- April 16: Saint Turibius of Liébana
- August 25: Thanksgiving Festival. Procession with Saint Peregrín

== Cultural associations ==
- Socio Cultural Association “Villa Alfovare”

== Tourism ==
- Walks through the river Oja poplar grove to Santo Domingo de la Calzada.

== See also ==
- List of municipalities in La Rioja
- La Rioja (Spain)
