= Alhama (river) =

River in Spain

Coordinates: 42.1839°N 1.7181°W

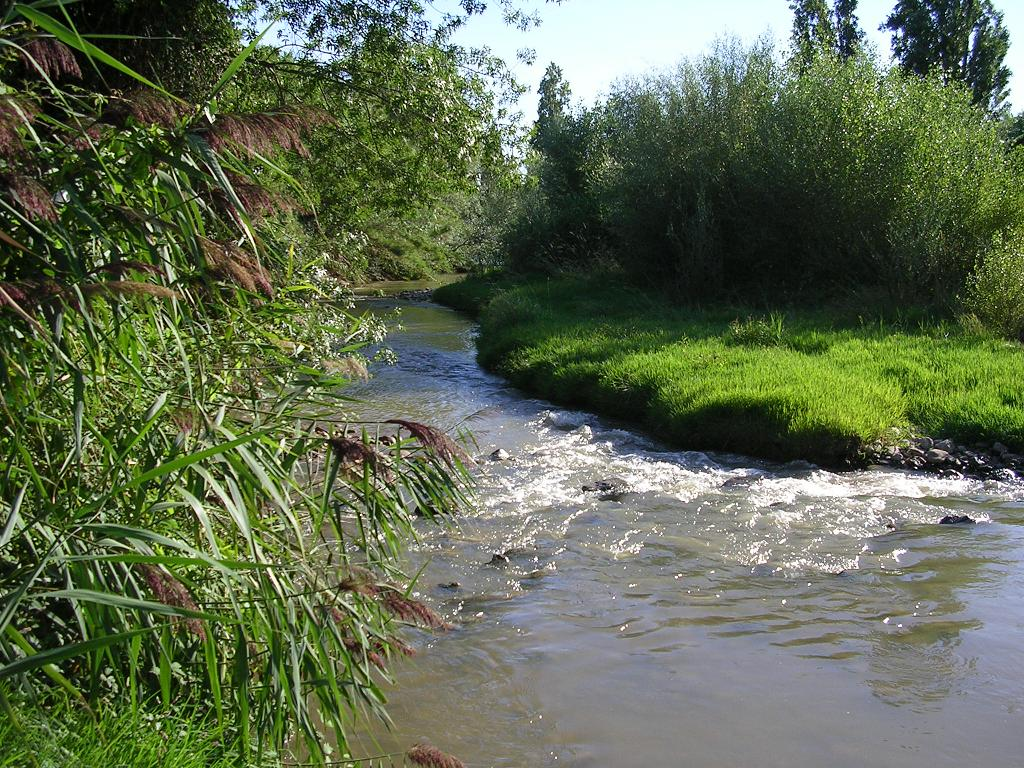
Alhama River

The Alhama is a tributary of the Ebro. Its source is Suellacabras, in Soria, and it flows for 80 kilometres (50 mi) until it reaches the Ebro at Alfaro (La Rioja).

== See also ==
- List of rivers of Spain
