= Herramélluri =

- Municipality
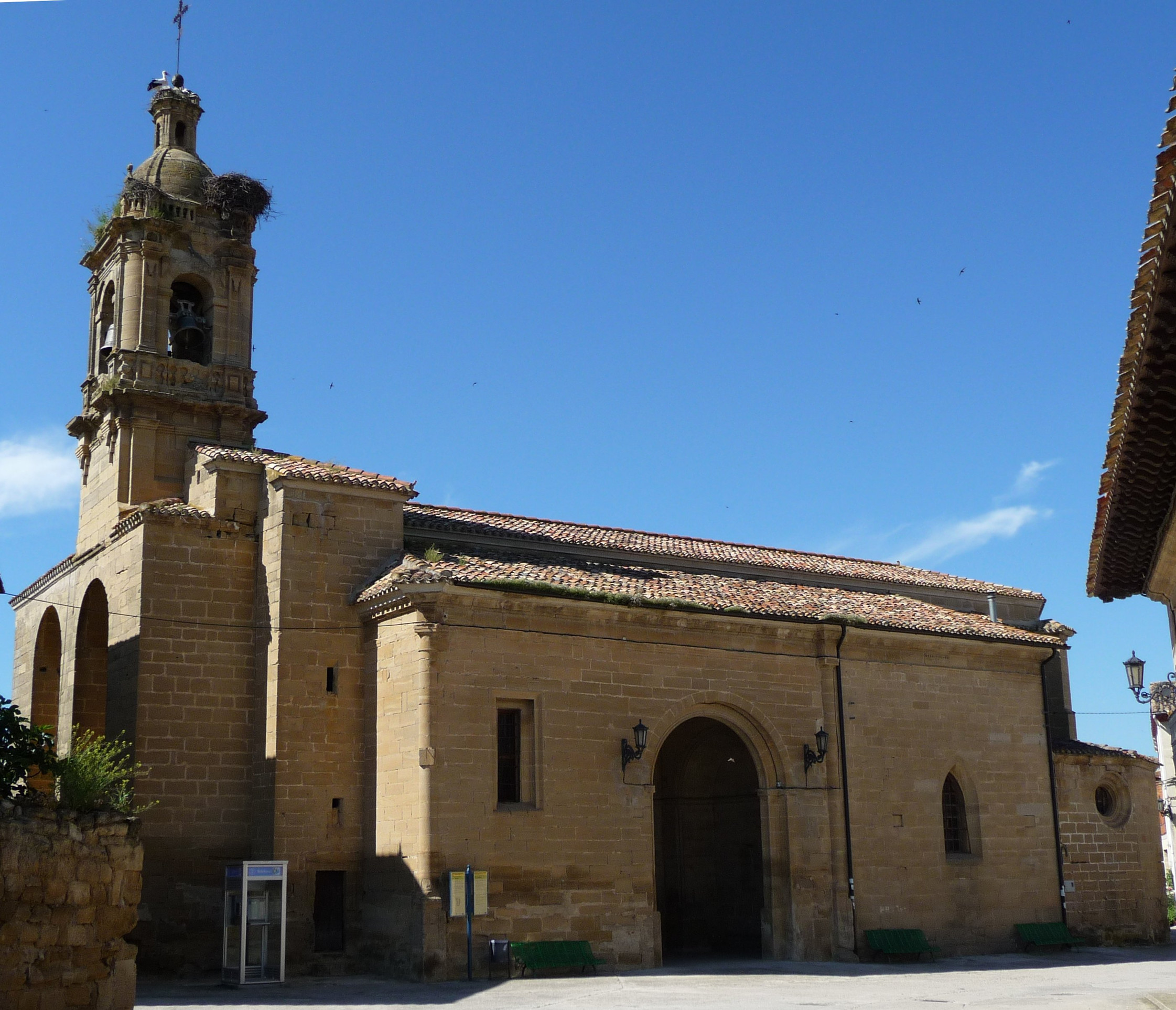
- Church of San Esteban

- Location within La Rioja, Spain Location within Spain
- Coordinates: 42°30′07″N 3°01′11″W
- Country: Spain
- Autonomous community: La Rioja
- Comarca: Santo Domingo de la Calzada

Government
  - Mayor: Felix Chinchetru Ranedo (PP)

Area
  - Total: 152.58 km^{2} (58.91 sq mi)
- Elevation: 575 m (1,886 ft)

Population (2025-01-01)
  - Total: 111
- Demonym: libiense
- Postal code: 26213

Herramélluri (Basque for 'Herramel's villa') is a village in the province and autonomous community of La Rioja, Spain. The municipality covers an area of 10.88 square kilometres (4.20 sq mi) and as of 2011 had a population of 106 people. It is named after Herramel, a lord in the 10th century.
