= List of municipalities in La Rioja =

Map of Spain with the province of La Rioja highlighted

A map of the municipalities in La Rioja, Spain

This is a list of the 173 municipalities in the province and autonomous community of La Rioja, Spain.

Name	Pop. (2006)
Ábalos	339
Agoncillo	1138
Aguilar del Río Alhama	629
Ajamil	82
Albelda de Iregua	2794
Alberite	2369
Alcanadre	722
Aldeanueva de Ebro	2652
Alesanco	488
Alesón	129
Alfaro	9550
Almarza de Cameros	28
Anguciana	442
Anguiano	546
Arenzana de Abajo	251
Arenzana de Arriba	39
Arnedillo	469
Arnedo	14,245
Arrúbal	464
Ausejo	772
Autol	3946
Azofra	273
Badarán	666
Bañares	334
Baños de Río Tobía	1737
Baños de Rioja	97
Berceo	196
Bergasa	142
Bergasillas Bajera	28
Bezares	21
Bobadilla	124
Brieva de Cameros	59
Briñas	251
Briones	878
Cabezón de Cameros	23
Calahorra	23,708
Camprovín	188
Canales de la Sierra	86
Canillas de Río Tuerto	42
Cañas	112
Cárdenas	197
Casalarreina	1315
Castañares de Rioja	384
Castroviejo	53
Cellorigo	18
Cenicero	2084
Cervera del Río Alhama	2984
Cidamón	33
Cihuri	182
Cirueña	123
Clavijo	269
Cordovín	215
Corera	267
Cornago	510
Corporales	46
Cuzcurrita de Río Tirón	487
Daroca de Rioja	48
Enciso	159
Entrena	1289
Estollo	127
Ezcaray	2010
Foncea	108
Fonzaleche	161
Fuenmayor	2998
Galbárruli	64
Galilea	314
Gallinero de Cameros	23
Gimileo	149
Grañón	360
Grávalos	239
Haro	10,965
Herce	381
Herramélluri	112
Hervías	121
Hormilla	439
Hormilleja	171
Hornillos de Cameros	14
Hornos de Moncalvillo	80
Huércanos	882
Igea	689
Jalón de Cameros	39
Laguna de Cameros	148
Lagunilla del Jubera	376
Lardero	6832
Ledesma de la Cogolla	27
Leiva	265
Leza de Río Leza	40
Logroño	147,036
Lumbreras	121
Manjarrés	151
Mansilla de la Sierra	72
Manzanares de Rioja	106
Matute	162
Medrano	188
Munilla	121
Murillo de Río Leza	1626
Muro de Aguas	65
Muro en Cameros	34
Nájera	7911
Nalda	1015
Navajún	18
Navarrete	2660
Nestares	69
Nieva de Cameros	120
Ochánduri	76
Ocón	322
Ojacastro	214
Ollauri	324
Ortigosa de Cameros	295
Pazuengos	40
Pedroso	101
Pinillos	19
Pradejón	3794
Pradillo	61
Préjano	200
Quel	1986
Rabanera	45
El Rasillo de Cameros	112
El Redal	186
Ribafrecha	1008
Rincón de Soto	3464
Robres del Castillo	31
Rodezno	320
Sajazarra	136
San Asensio	1322
San Millán de la Cogolla	302
San Millán de Yécora	64
San Román de Cameros	164
San Torcuato	104
San Vicente de la Sonsierra	1190
Santa Coloma	151
Santa Engracia del Jubera	195
Santa Eulalia Bajera	119
Santo Domingo de la Calzada	6385
Santurde de Rioja	325
Santurdejo	175
Sojuela	124
Sorzano	263
Sotés	267
Soto en Cameros	178
Terroba	30
Tirgo	242
Tobía	75
Tormantos	194
Torre en Cameros	18
Torrecilla en Cameros	549
Torrecilla sobre Alesanco	49
Torremontalbo	20
Treviana	218
Tricio	431
Tudelilla	410
Uruñuela	849
Valdemadera	10
Valgañón	149
Ventosa	143
Ventrosa	69
Viguera	405
Villalba de Rioja	154
Villalobar de Rioja	79
Villamediana de Iregua	4668
Villanueva de Cameros	109
El Villar de Arnedo	625
Villar de Torre	272
Villarejo	40
Villarroya	11
Villarta-Quintana	165
Villavelayo	69
Villaverde de Rioja	71
Villoslada de Cameros	376
Viniegra de Abajo	98
Viniegra de Arriba	46
Zarratón	255
Zarzosa	12
Zorraquín	73

== See also ==
- Geography of Spain
- List of cities in Spain
