= El Villar =

El Villar can refer to:

- Villar del Arzobispo, municipality in Valencia, Spain
- El Villar de Arnedo, municipality in La Rioja, Spain
- Elvillar/Bilar, municipality in Álava, Basque Country, Spain
