= Sancho de Londoño =

Spanish soldier and military writer (c.1515–1569)

- Born: 1515; Hormilla, Spain
- Died: 1569 (aged 53–54)
- Allegiance: Spanish Empire
- Branch: (Spanish Empire) Spanish Army
- Rank: Maestre de campo
- Commands: Tercio de Lombardía
- Other work: writer

Sancho de Londoño (c.1515–1569) was a Spanish soldier and military writer.

== Early life ==
Sancho de Londono was born in Hormilla, Spain, to Antonio de Londoño, then the lord of Hormilla, and Ana Martínez de Ariz.

== Works ==
- Discurso sobre la forma de reducir la disciplina a mejor y antiguo estado (Brussels, 1589)
- Libro del arte militar (Valencia, 1596)
