= Briñas =

- Municipality
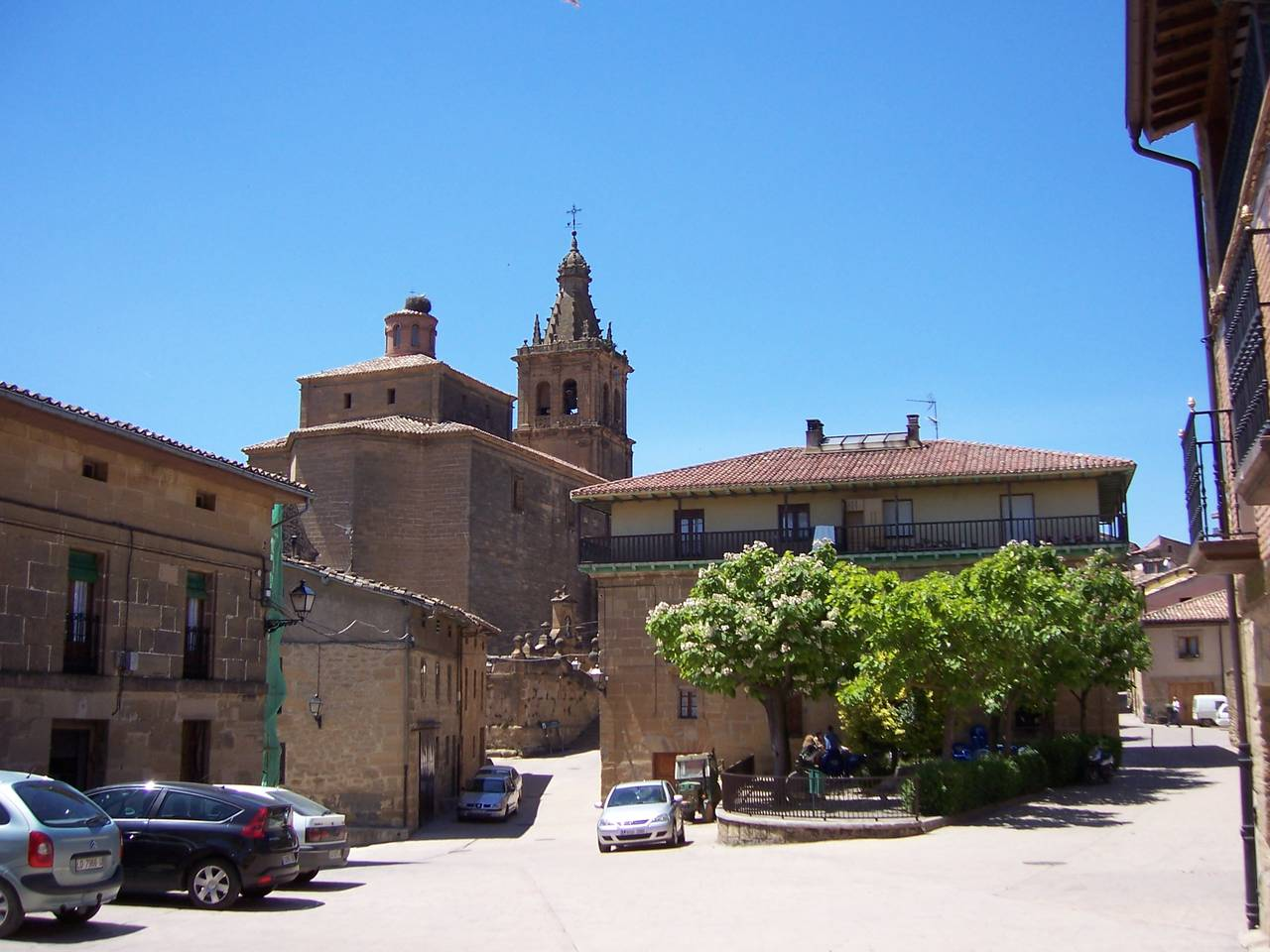
- Main square. At the back, church of La Asunción

- Location within La Rioja, Spain Location within Spain
- Coordinates: 42°36′04″N 2°49′53″W
- Country: Spain
- Autonomous community: La Rioja
- Comarca: Haro

Government
  - Mayor: Ángel Seisas Ruiz (PP)

Area
  - Total: 2.44 km^{2} (0.94 sq mi)
- Elevation: 456 m (1,496 ft)

Population (2025-01-01)
  - Total: 191
- Demonym: briguense
- Postal code: 26290
- Website: Official website

Briñas is a town and municipality in the province and autonomous community of La Rioja, Spain.

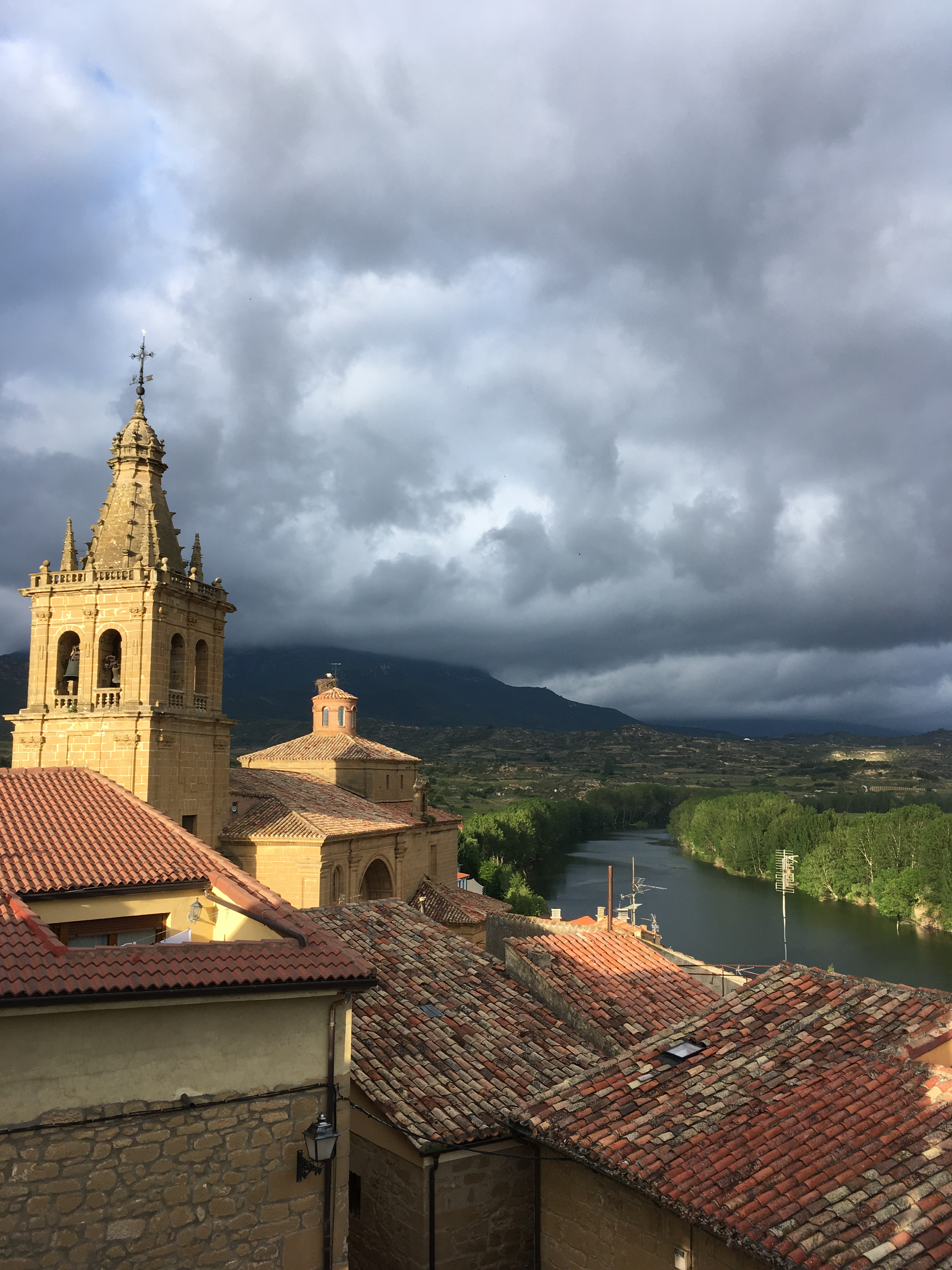
The church tower and the River Ebro in Briñas, La Rioja

The town is located 3 km to the north of Haro, on the opposite bank of the River Ebro, in the Rioja Alta wine region.

The municipality covers an area of 2.44 square kilometres (0.94 sq mi), bounded on the west and south by the river and the north and west by the municipality of Labastida. As of 2011 it had a population of 249 people.
