= Anguciana =

- Municipality
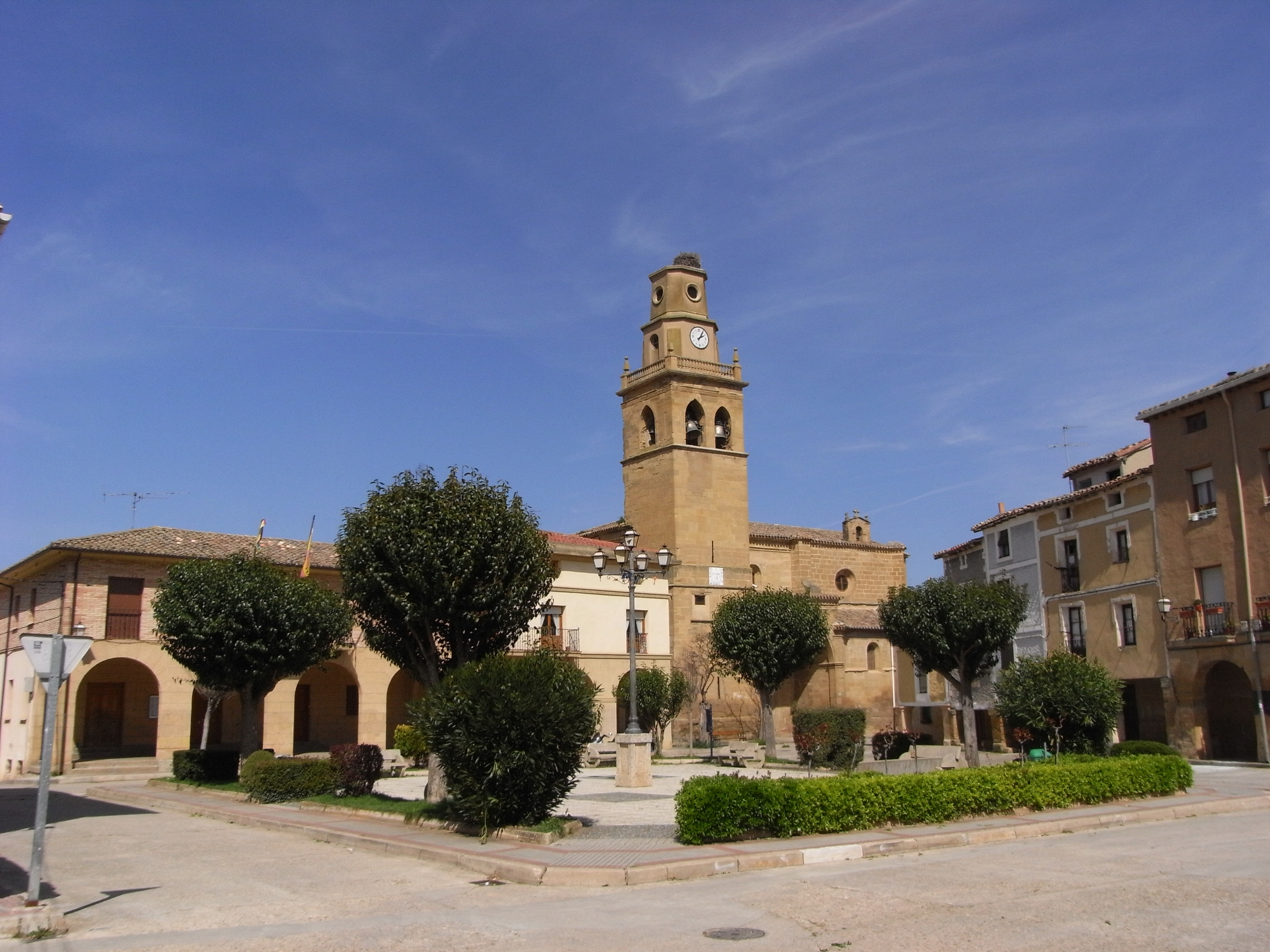

- Location of Anguciana within La Rioja Anguciana (Spain)
- Coordinates: 42°34′31″N 2°54′09″W
- Country: Spain
- Autonomous community: La Rioja
- Comarca: Haro

Government
  - Mayor: Jorge Loyo Mendoza (PP)

Area
  - Total: 5.05 km^{2} (1.95 sq mi)

Population (2025-01-01)
  - Total: 450
  - Density: 89/km^{2} (230/sq mi)
- Time zone: UTC+1 (CET)
  - Summer (DST): UTC+2 (CEST)
- Postal code: 26210
- Website: Official website

Anguciana is a village in the province and autonomous community of La Rioja, Spain. It is situated in the northwest of the province. It depends on the judicial administration of Haro. The municipality covers an area of 5.05 square kilometres (1.95 sq mi) and as of 2011 had a population of 471 people.

== History ==
Municipal boundary of Anguciana.

In 1121, Toda López de Haro y Álvarez, daughter of Lope Iñiguez, Anguciana lady of, donated to the Monastery of Santa Maria la Real de Nájera Cihuri all her inheritance in and also post mortem nostram, casam nostram quae est in Angunciana sicut tenuimos et habuimus in vita nostra (after our death our cottage which is in Angunciana place we possessed and in which we have lived throughout our lives). Diego López de Haro I, brother of Toda, endorsed the writing. He added this endorsement Regnante rege Aldefonso in Castella, et in Alava, et in Pampilona, et in Aragone, et i Ribacurta (During the reign of king Alfonso in Castile, and in Alava, and in Pampeluna, and in Aragon, and in Ribacurta). This is the King Alfonso I of Aragon, called the Batallador.

From the fourteenth century it was the domain of the Salcedos, who inhabited the strong tower located near the River Tirón bridge and on which, today, there are still some loopholes and the south entrance. The Lordship was conferred on Juan Alfonso de Salcedo by Henry III of Castile by privilege dated March 8, 1394, in consideration and compensation for many good services rendered to Juan I of Castile (his father), in the guard of his body. As a further privilege on February 12, 1397, he granted license to build in this location a house so strong and accomplished, as the King himself would have commanded to be built for himself.

Until the creation of the province of Logroño in 1833 and its partition into nine judicial districts (1834), it belonged to the party of Santo Domingo de la Calzada, in the province of Burgos.

== Demography ==
In the population census of Corona de Castilla in the sixteenth century it appears incorrectly with the name Anguiana, with a total of 61 neighborhoods, 305 inhabitants.

In the nineteenth century census it appears under Oreca, which belonged to the Padres Bernards de Herrera and today it is the district of Anguciana to the left of the Tirón River, on the road to Cihuri.

The census for the formation of the province of Logroño, 1840 indicates "106 neighborhoods, 474 souls."

The municipality has been one that, proportionally, has shown an increased population growth in La Rioja. Between 2004 and 2006 it gained 112 inhabitants (34%), this increase was particularly strong between 2005 and 2006 (93 inhabitants).

On 1 January 2010 the population was 510 inhabitants, 281 men and 229 women.

demographic vertical bar chart of between 1857 and 2010
Legal population (1857–1897) according to the population census published by the Instituto Nacional de Estadística in the 19th century.
Legal population (1900–1991) or Resident population (2001) according to the population census published by the Instituto Nacional de Estadística.
Population according to the municipal register of 2010 published by the Instituto Nacional de Estadística.

== Places of interest ==
=== Buildings and monuments ===
Torre Fuerte (Strong tower)

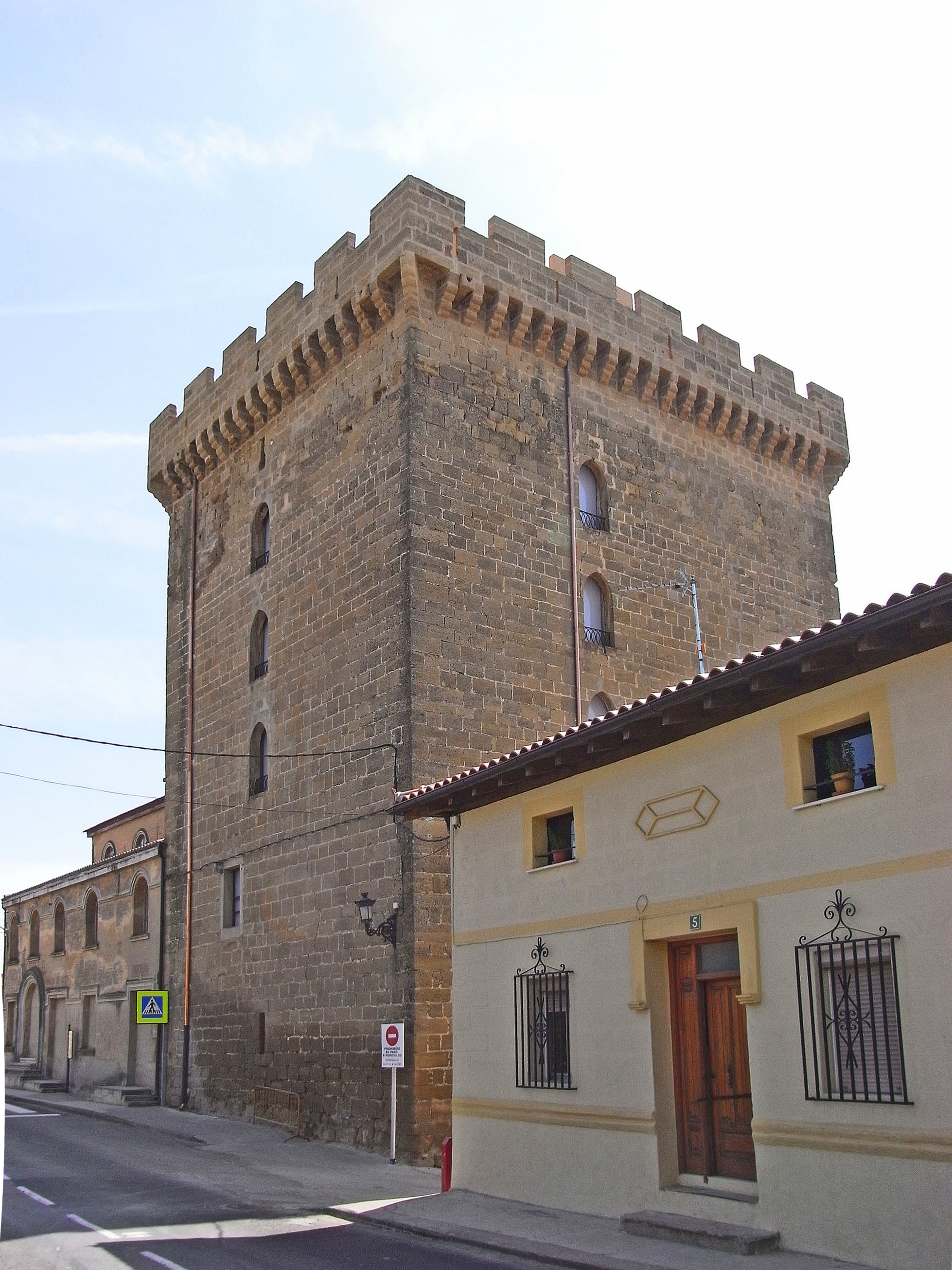
Anguciana Strong Tower.

A good example of military architecture, construction of the Gothic tower started in 1397 by Juan Alfonso de Salcedo along the Tirón River Bridge, after Henry III of Castille granted him the lordship of Anguciana for his services to the crown, and also granted him permission (required at the time), to build the fort.

It is built in stone. Its plan is rectangular. The top is crowned with turrets and battlements, although those at the second level are a recent addition. There are still some arrow loops from the original building. Its walls have been experimented on in recent times with various warhead windows and embrasures besides having been divided into several floors.

In 1920 it was sold to a Franciscan community from Peru who installed a school. It was subsequently acquired by a private individual. It remains in good condition.

San Martin Church

Construction of the church began in the early sixteenth century. The two chapels of the first section, the bottom of the tower, the cover and the remodelled headboard are seventeenth century. The chapel of the second section is from the eighteenth century. The rest is from the nineteenth century, except for the upper sections of the tower from the twentieth century.

Bridge above the Tirón river

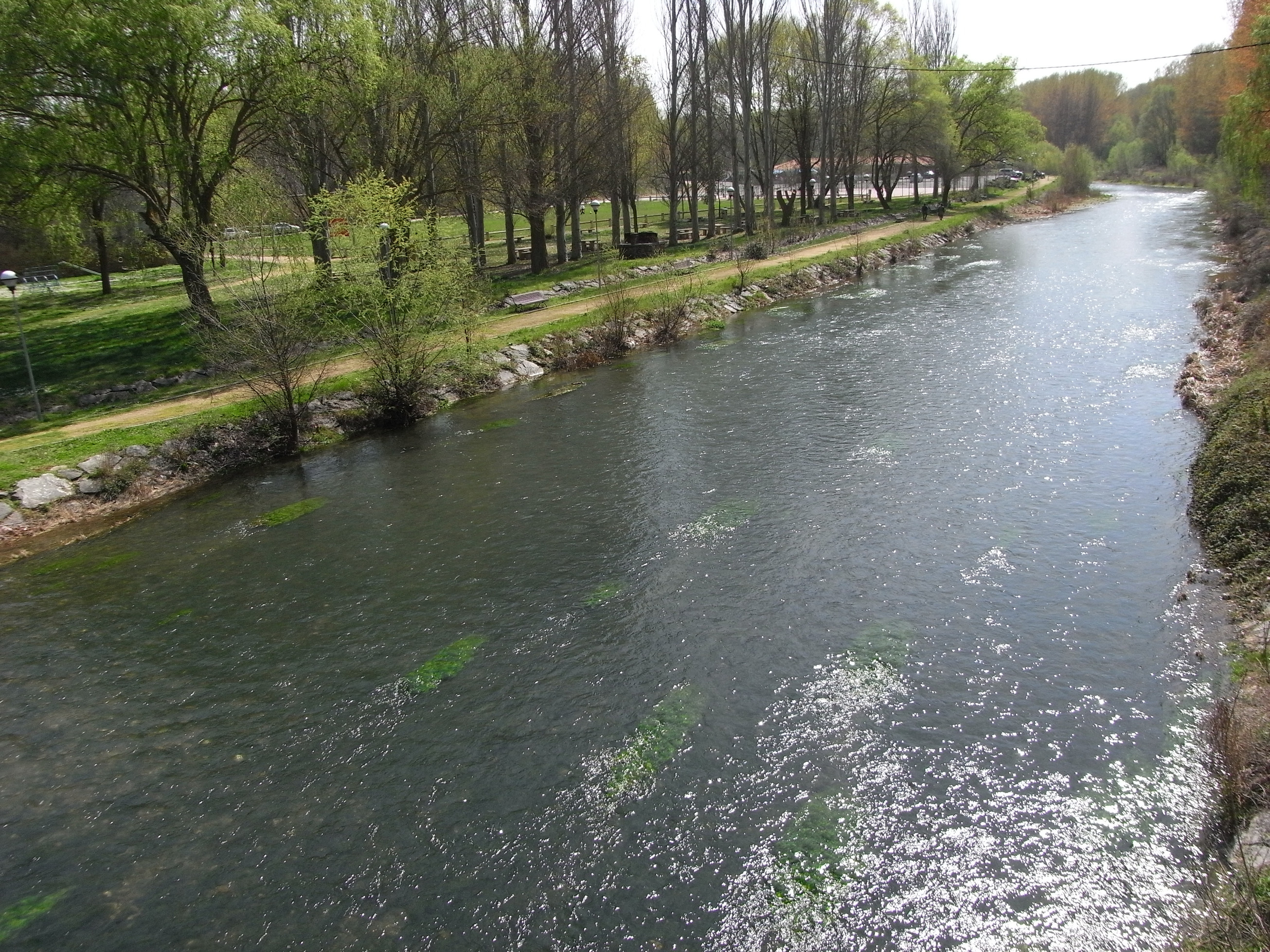
The Tirón river from the stone bridge.

Santa María de Oreca Hermitage

From the eighteenth century.

Concepción and also the Esclavitud Hermitage

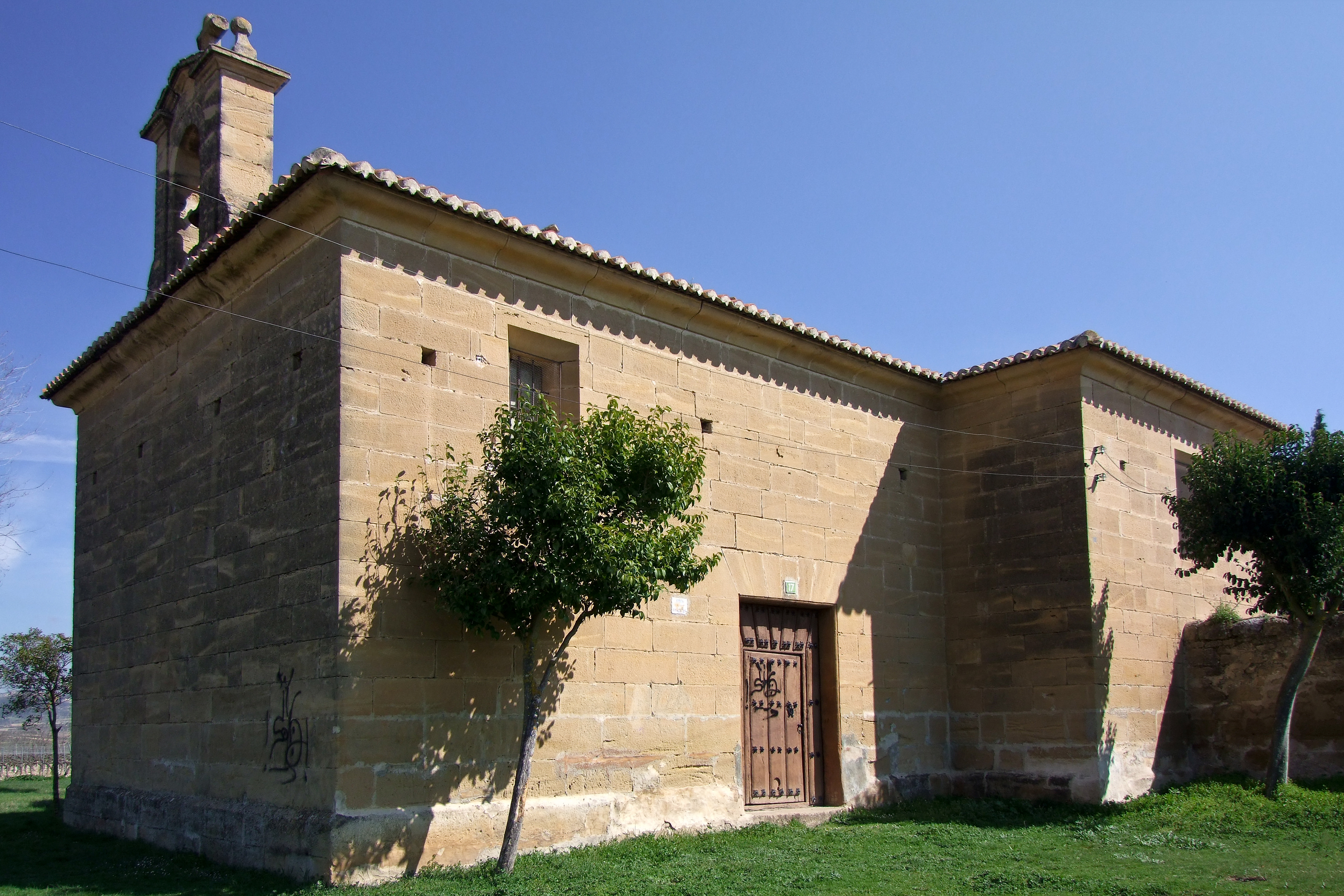
Concepción Hermitage.

Located next to the cemetery, eighteenth century, consists of a single nave with rectangular head.

== Celebrations ==
- April 29, San Pedro de Verona martyr: Procession to the Purísima Concepción Hermitage with the Virgen de la Concepción. Passing of the zurracapote bowl and cheese.
- August 24, San Bartolomé and thanksgiving.

== Notable people ==
- Manuel Pablo Salcedo y Ortes de Velasco, descendant of Juan Alfonso de Salcedo and thirteenth Lord of the castle, he belonged to the Royal House of Castile.
- José Salcedo, brother of Manuel Pablo, was senior chaplain of the Reyes Nuevos de Toledo in the eighteenth century.
- Julian Cantera Orive, La Rioja historian and author of La Batalla de Clavijo (The Battle of Clavijo), died in 1972.
