= Gimileo =

- Municipality
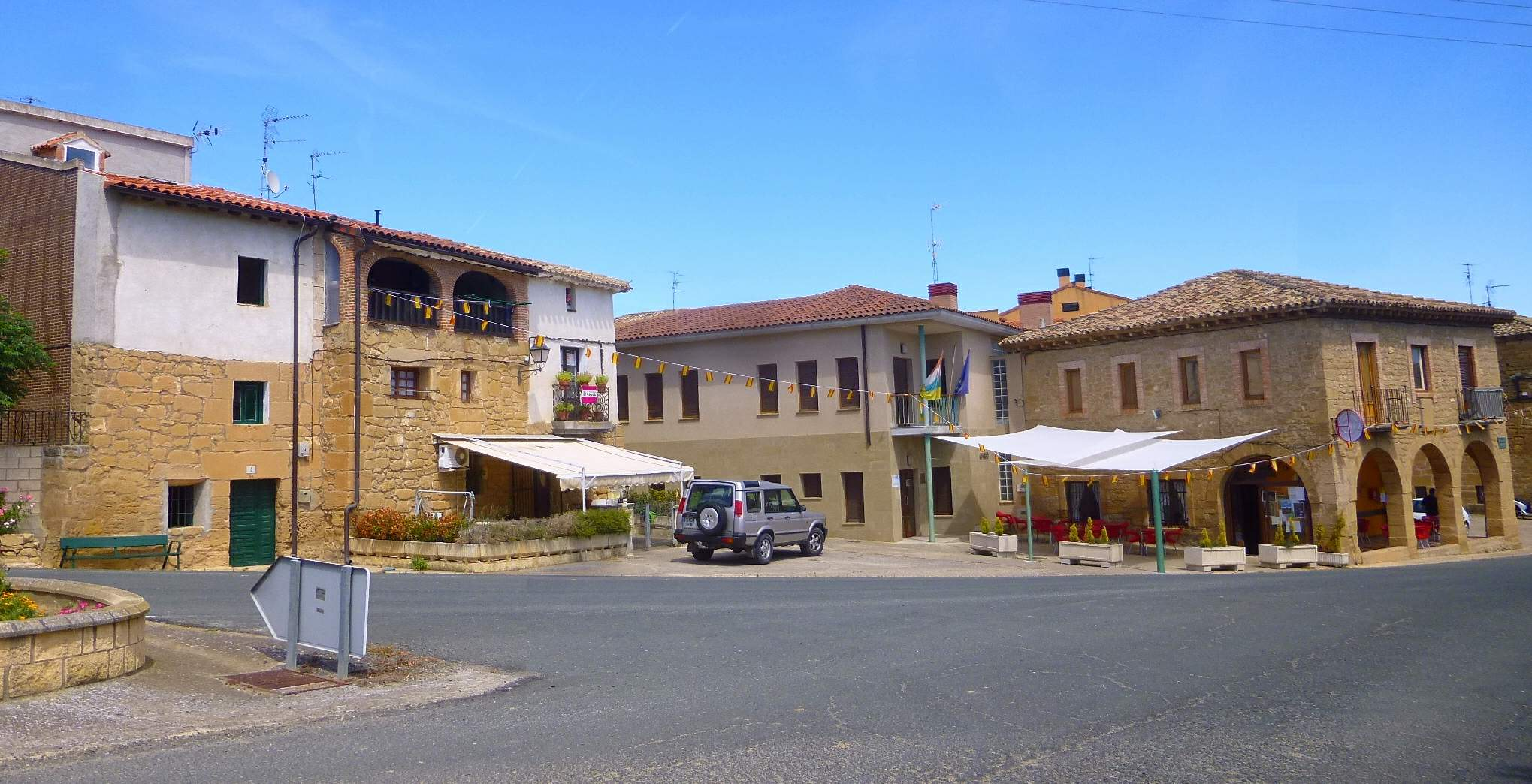

- Flag Coat of arms

- Location within La Rioja, Spain Location within Spain
- Coordinates: 42°32′57″N 2°49′21″W
- Country: Spain
- Autonomous community: La Rioja
- Comarca: Haro

Government
  - Mayor: César Aurelio Cuevas Pérez (PR)

Area
  - Total: 4 km^{2} (1.5 sq mi)
- Elevation: 478 m (1,568 ft)

Population (2025-01-01)
  - Total: 122
- Demonym(s): gimileano, na
- Postal code: 26221
- Website: Official website

Gimileo (Spanish pronunciation: [ximiˈleo]) is a village in the province and autonomous community of La Rioja, Spain. The municipality covers an area of 4 square kilometres (1.5 sq mi) and in 2011 had a population of 171.
