= Fonzaleche =

- Municipality
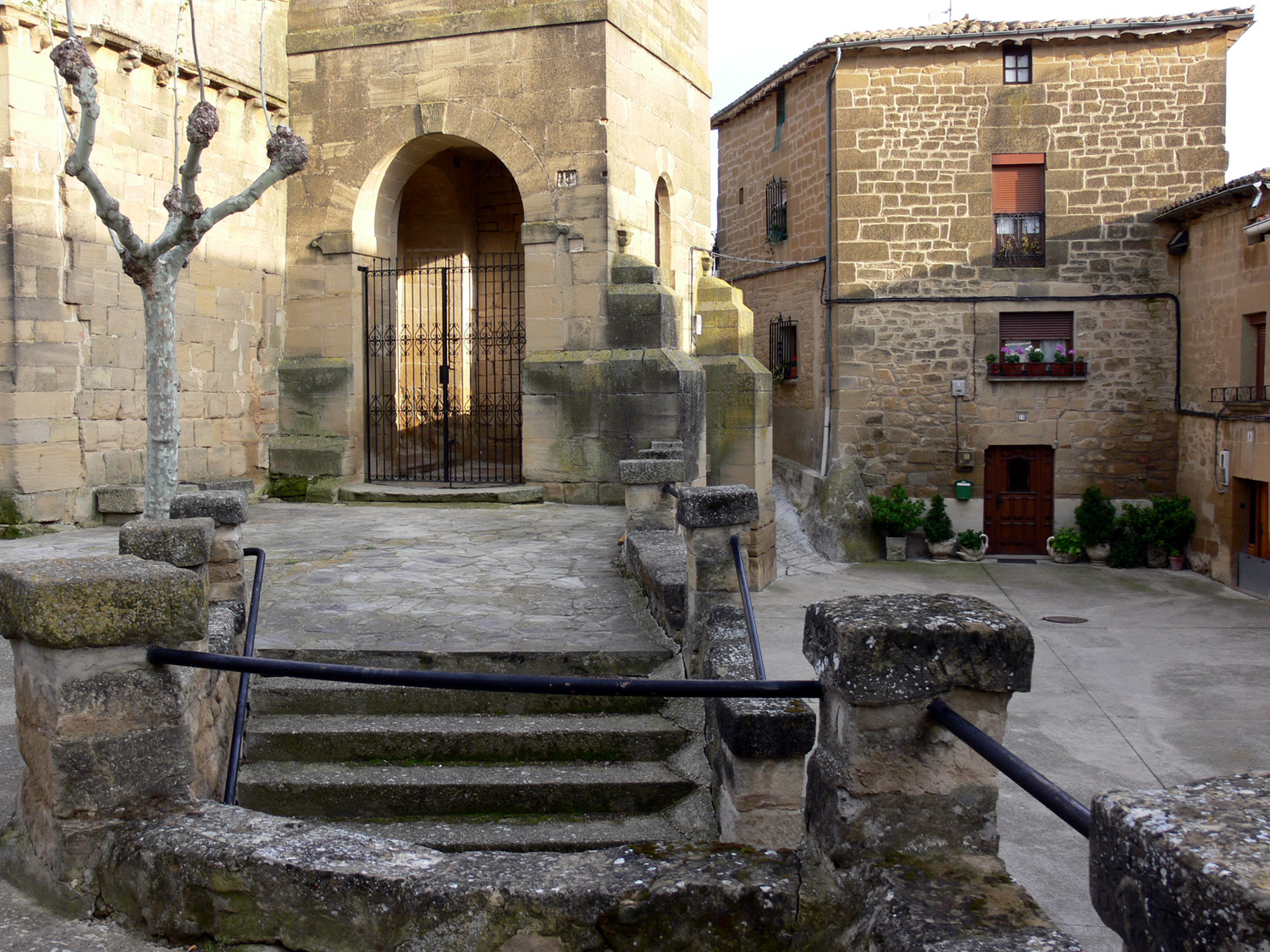
- Church square

- Location within La Rioja, Spain Location within Spain
- Coordinates: 42°34′52″N 3°00′42″W
- Country: Spain
- Autonomous community: La Rioja
- Comarca: Haro

Government
  - Mayor: Juan Carlos Nájera Jiménez (PP)

Area
  - Total: 17 km^{2} (6.6 sq mi)
- Elevation: 559 m (1,834 ft)

Population (2025-01-01)
  - Total: 138
- Postal code: 26211
- Website: www.fonzaleche.es

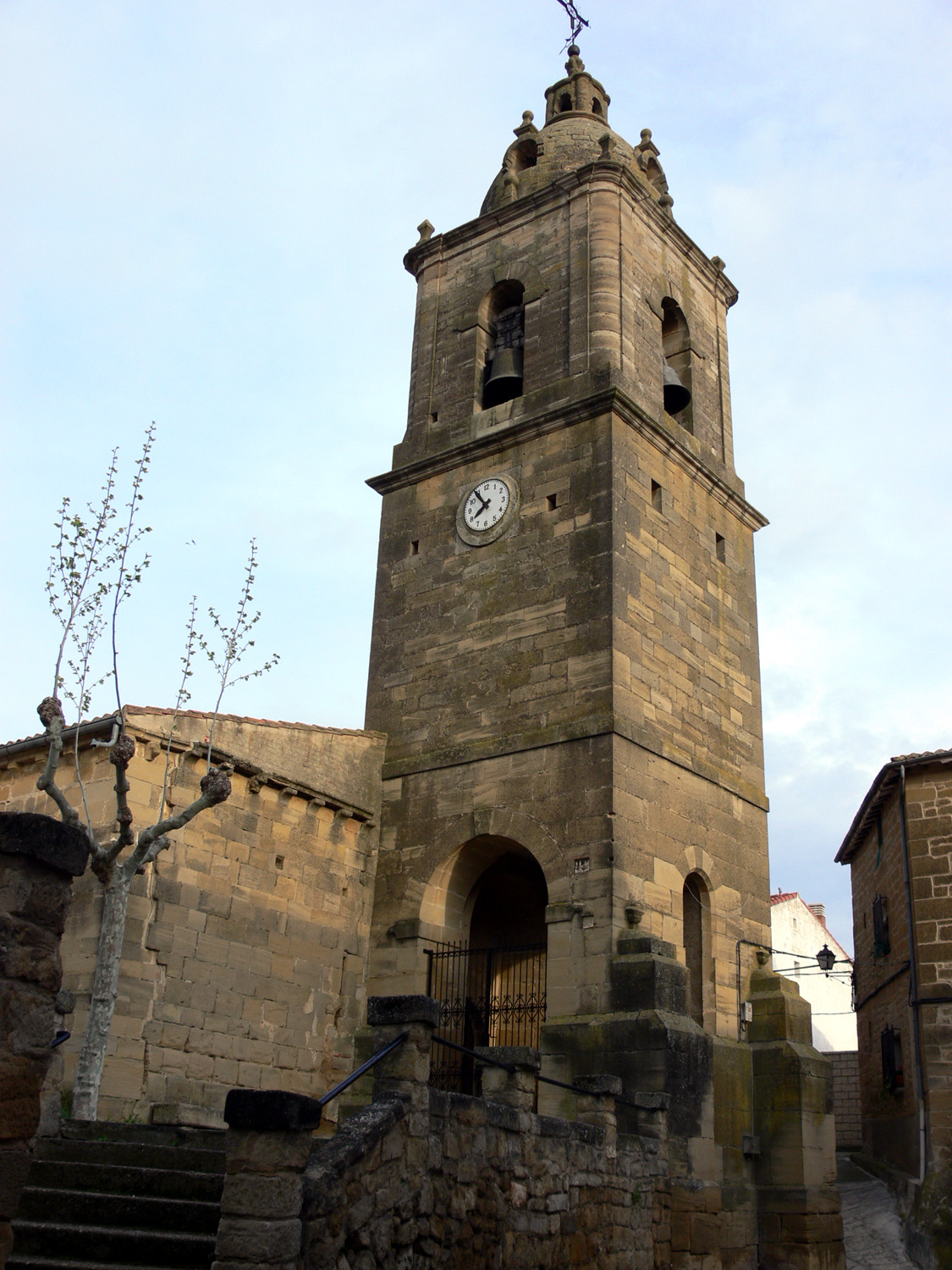
Saint Martin Church

Fonzaleche is a village in the province and autonomous community of La Rioja, Spain. The municipality covers an area of 17 square kilometres (6.6 sq mi) and as of January 2017 had a population of 134 people.
