= Ochánduri =

- Municipality
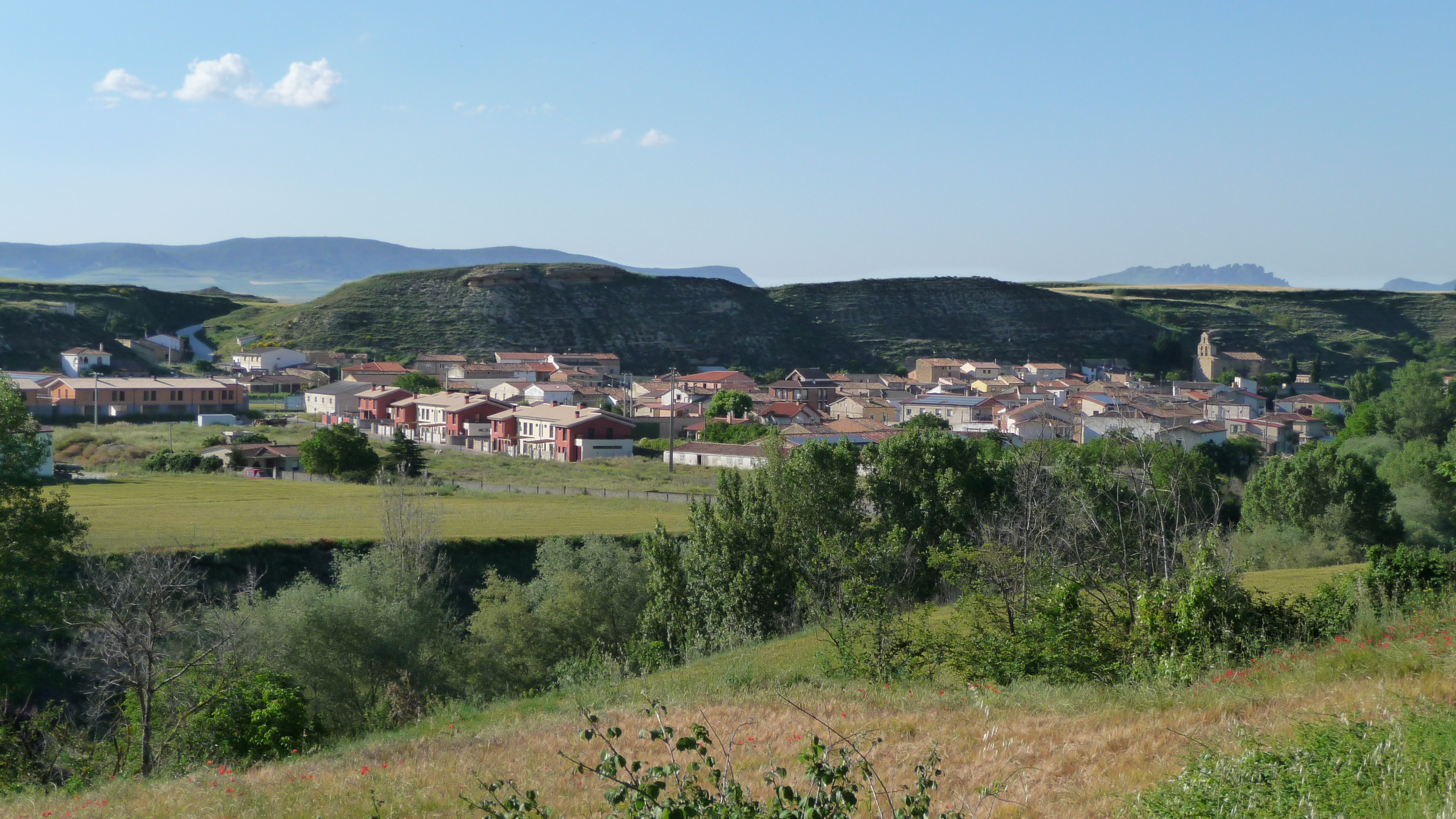
- Skyline of Ochánduri

- Location within La Rioja, Spain Location within Spain
- Coordinates: 42°31′29″N 3°00′11″W
- Country: Spain
- Autonomous community: La Rioja
- Comarca: Haro

Government
  - Mayor: Pascual Ugarte Marrón (PP)

Area
  - Total: 11.72 km^{2} (4.53 sq mi)
- Elevation: 550 m (1,800 ft)

Population (2025-01-01)
  - Total: 78
- Demonym(s): ochandurino, a
- Postal code: 26213

Ochánduri (Spanish pronunciation: [oˈtʃanduɾi]) is a village in the province and autonomous community of La Rioja, Spain. The municipality covers an area of 11.72 square kilometres (4.53 sq mi) and as of 2011 had a population of 120 people.
