= Tudelilla =

- Municipality
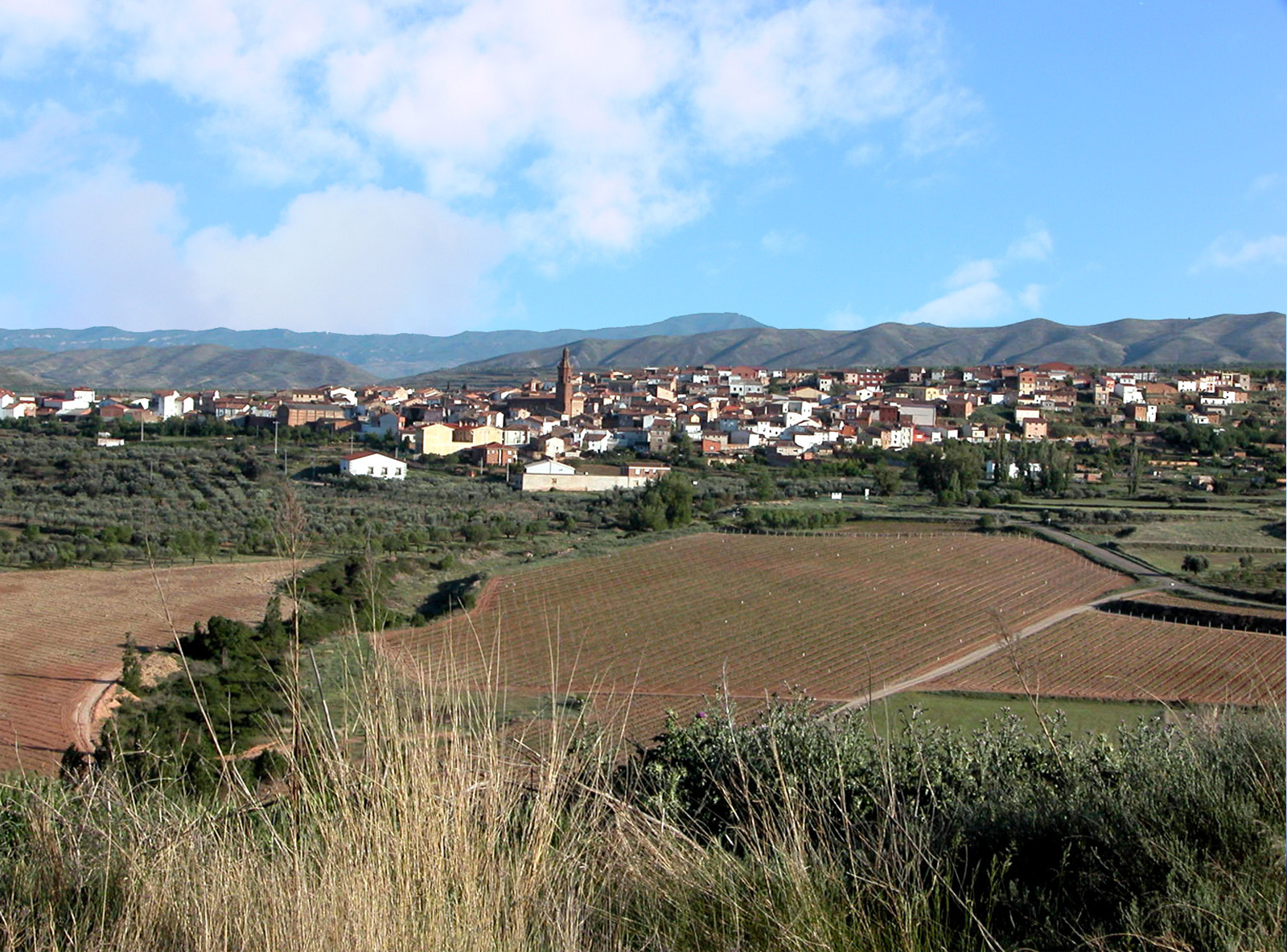
- Skyline of Tudelilla

- Flag Coat of arms

- Location within La Rioja, Spain Location within Spain
- Coordinates: 42°17′58″N 2°06′58″W
- Country: Spain
- Autonomous community: La Rioja
- Comarca: Calahorra
  - Mayor: (PP)

Area
  - Total: 19.06 km^{2} (7.36 sq mi)
- Elevation: 545 m (1,788 ft)

Population (2025-01-01)
  - Total: 360
- Postal code: 26512
- Website: tudelilla.com

Tudelilla is a village in the province and autonomous community of La Rioja, Spain. The municipality covers an area of 19.06 square kilometres (7.36 sq mi) and as of 2011 had a population of 386 people.
