= Comarca de Calahorra =

Calahorra
- Comarca
- Interactive map of Calahorra
- Coordinates: 42.292083°N 2.071597°W
- Country: Spain

Calahorra is a comarca, thus a group of municipalities, in La Rioja Autonomous Community in Spain.
