= Manjarrés =

- Municipality
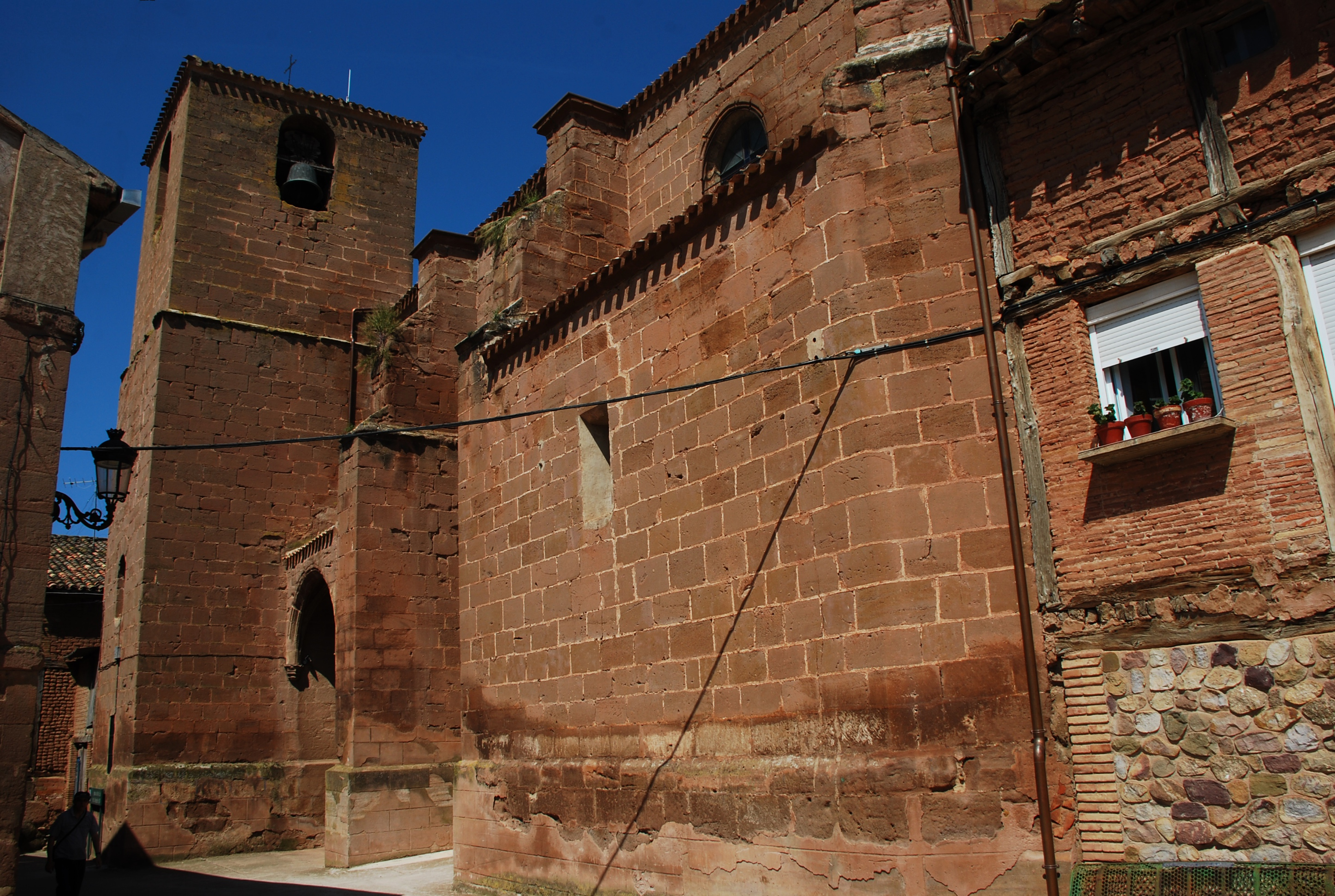
- Church of Asunción in Manjarrés

- Flag Coat of arms

- Location within La Rioja, Spain Location within Spain
- Coordinates: 42°22′33″N 2°40′30″W
- Country: Spain
- Autonomous community: La Rioja
- Comarca: Nájera

Government
  - Mayor: Santiago García Manzanares (PP)

Area
  - Total: 6.16 km^{2} (2.38 sq mi)
- Elevation: 630 m (2,070 ft)

Population (2025-01-01)
  - Total: 97
- Postal code: 26315

Manjarrés is a village in the province and autonomous community of La Rioja, Spain. The municipality covers an area of 6.16 square kilometres (2.38 sq mi) and as of 2011 had a population of 152 people.
