= Zarzosa =

- Municipality
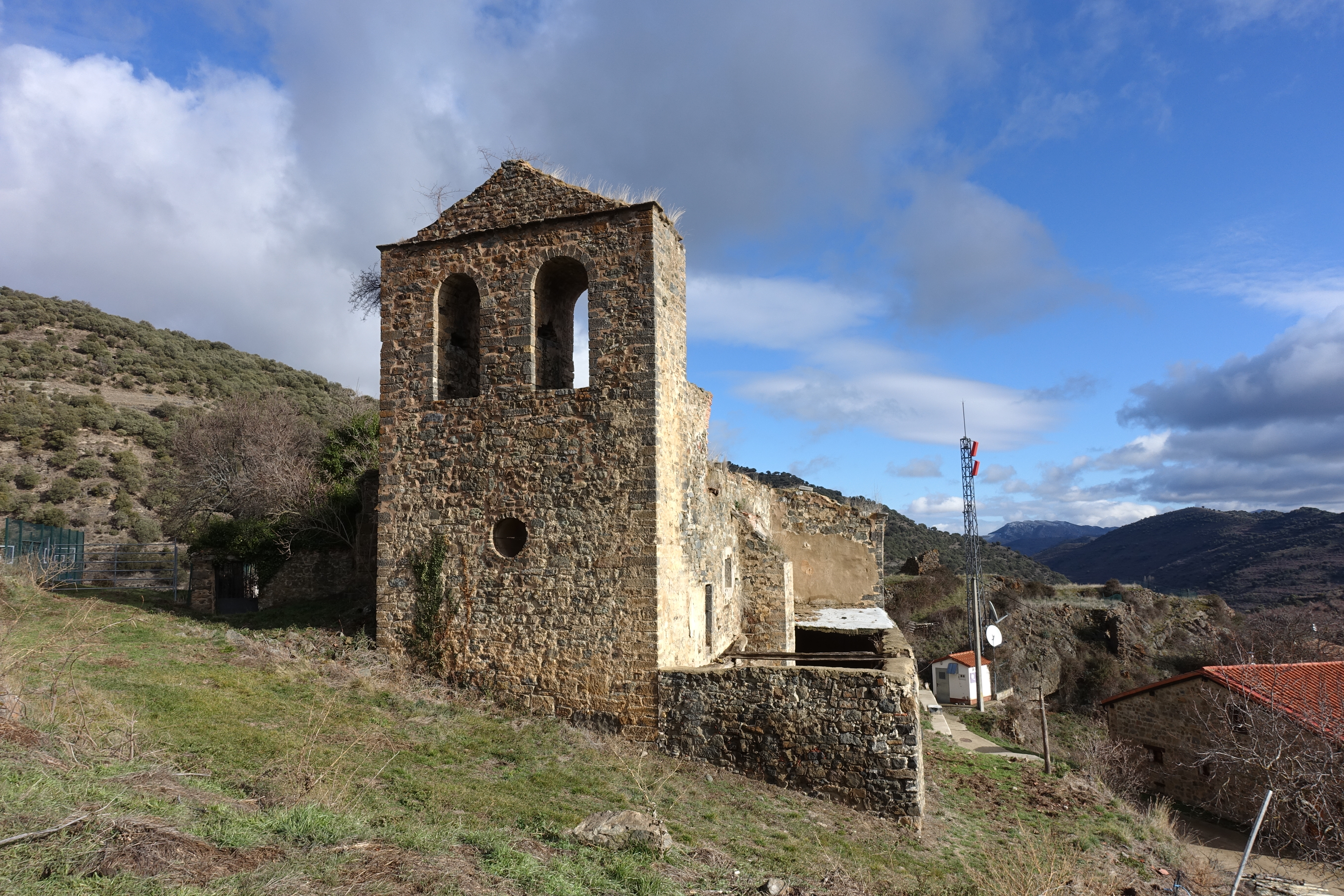

- Location within La Rioja, Spain Location within Spain
- Coordinates: 42°10′53″N 2°20′31″W
- Country: Spain
- Autonomous community: La Rioja
- Comarca: Arnedo

Government
  - Alcalde: José María Sáenz Blanco (People's Party)

Area
  - Total: 18.29 km^{2} (7.06 sq mi)
- Elevation: 978 m (3,209 ft)

Population (2025-01-01)
  - Total: 14
  - Density: 0.77/km^{2} (2.0/sq mi)
- Postal code: 26586

Zarzosa is a village in the province and autonomous community of La Rioja, Spain. The municipality covers an area of 18.29 square kilometres (7.06 sq mi) and as of 2011 had a population of 15 people.

== Politics ==
List of mayors since the democratic elections of 1979
Term	Mayor	Political party
1979–1983	Ángel Rodríguez Rodrigo	UCD
1983–1987	Ángel Rodríguez Rodrigo	AP
1987–1991	Ángel Rodríguez Rodrigo	AP
1991–1995	Ángel Rodríguez Rodrigo	PP
1995–1999	José María Sáenz Blanco	PP
1999–2003	José María Sáenz Blanco	PP
2003–2007	José María Sáenz Blanco	PP
2007–2011	José María Sáenz Blanco	PP
2011–2015	José María Sáenz Blanco	PP
2015–2019	José María Sáenz Blanco	PP
2019–2023	n/d	n/d
2023–	n/d	n/d
