= Arenzana de Arriba =

- Municipality
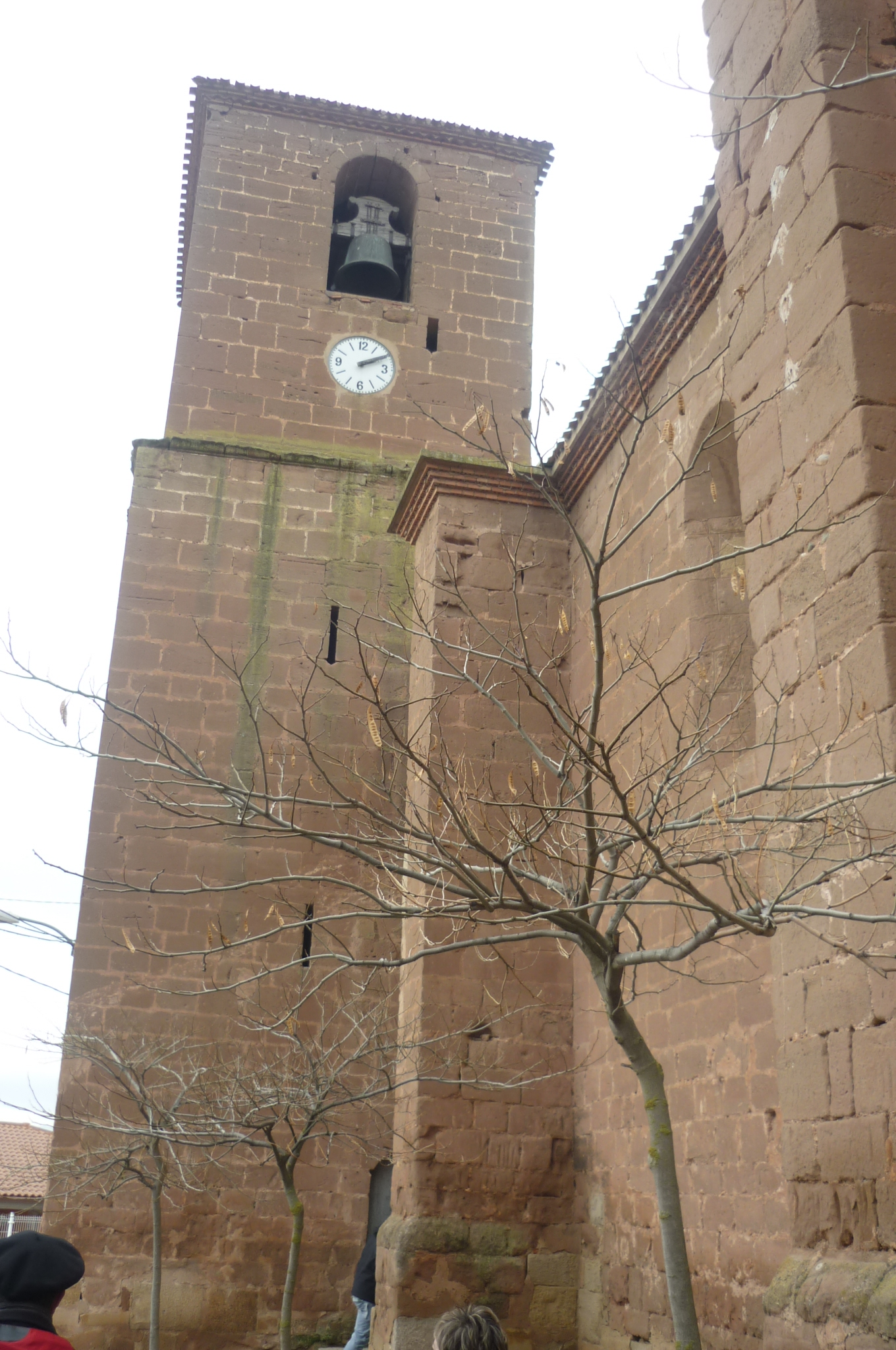
- Parish church

- Location within La Rioja, Spain Location within Spain
- Coordinates: 42°23′15″N 2°41′38″W
- Country: Spain
- Autonomous community: La Rioja
- Comarca: Nájera

Government
  - Mayor: Jesús Armiñanzas Sáenz (PP)

Area
  - Total: 5.92 km^{2} (2.29 sq mi)
- Elevation: 597 m (1,959 ft)

Population (2025-01-01)
  - Total: 37
- Postal code: 26312

Arenzana de Arriba is a village in the province and autonomous community of La Rioja, Spain. The municipality covers an area of 5.92 square kilometres (2.29 sq mi) and as of 2011 had a population of 34 people.

== Politics ==
List of mayors since the democratic elections of 1979
Term	Mayor	Political party
1979–1983	Abel García Melón	UCD
1983–1987	Abel García Melón	PSOE
1987–1991	Miguel Ángel Pérez Domínguez	PSOE
1991–1995	Eleuterio Jesús Armiñanzas García	PP
1995–1999	Francisco Prado Melón	PSOE
1999–2003	Pedro Ramiro Mateo Nieto	PSOE
2003–2007	Jesús Armiñanzas Sáenz	PP
2007–2011	Jesús Armiñanzas Sáenz	PP
2011–2015	Jesús Armiñanzas Sáenz	PP
2015–2019	Jesús Armiñanzas Sáenz	PP
2019–2023	n/d	n/d
2023–	n/d	n/d
