= Bezares =

- Municipality
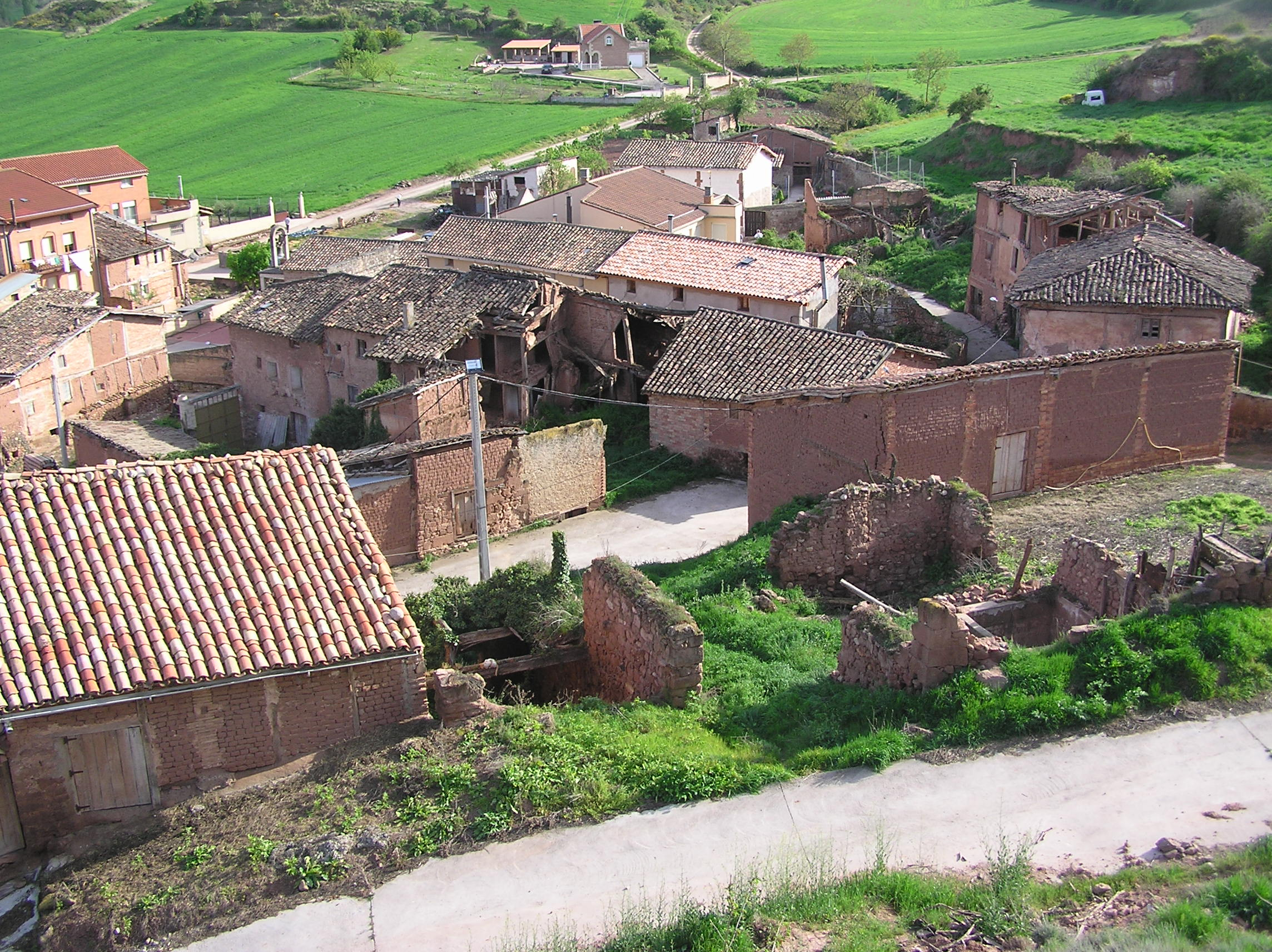
- Skyline of Bezares

- Location within La Rioja, Spain Location within Spain
- Coordinates: 42°22′13″N 2°40′15″W
- Country: Spain
- Autonomous community: La Rioja
- Comarca: Nájera

Government
  - Mayor: Jesús Fernández Nájera (PP)

Area
  - Total: 4.62 km^{2} (1.78 sq mi)
- Elevation: 698 m (2,290 ft)

Population (2025-01-01)
  - Total: 19
- Postal code: 26312

Bezares is a village in the province and autonomous community of La Rioja, Spain. The municipality covers an area of 4.62 square kilometres (1.78 sq mi) and as of 2011 had a population of 19 people.
