= El Villar de Arnedo =

- Municipality
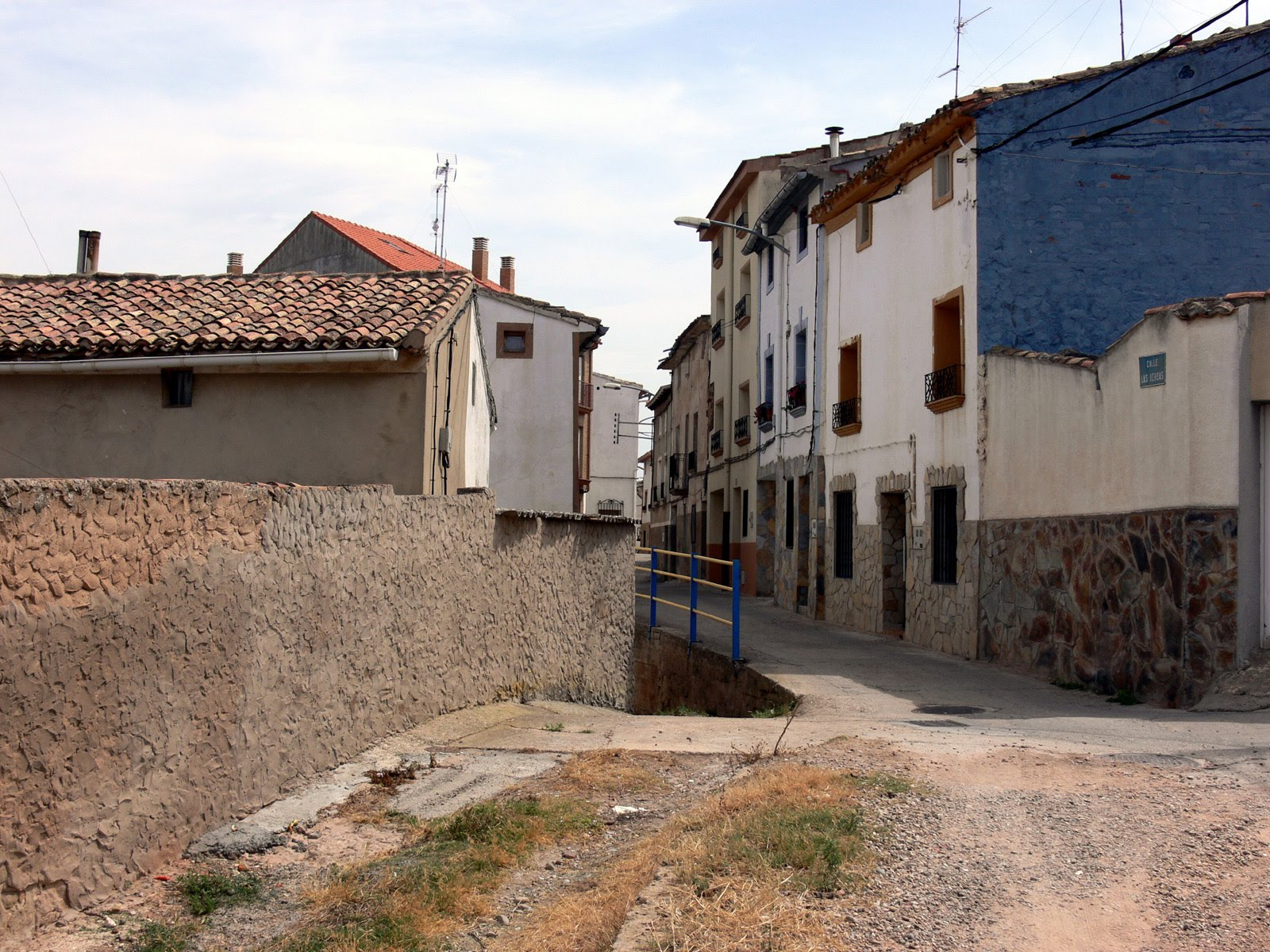
- Street of El Villar de Arnedo

- Flag Coat of arms

- Location within La Rioja, Spain Location within Spain
- Coordinates: 42°19′14″N 2°05′43″W
- Country: Spain
- Autonomous community: La Rioja
- Comarca: Calahorra

Government
  - Mayor: Jesús Pedro Espinosa Espinosa (PP)

Area
  - Total: 18.25 km^{2} (7.05 sq mi)
- Elevation: 428 m (1,404 ft)

Population (2025-01-01)
  - Total: 645
- Demonym(s): villarejo, ja
- Postal code: 26511
- Website: www.elvillardearnedo.org

El Villar de Arnedo is a village in the province and autonomous community of La Rioja, Spain. The municipality covers an area of 18.25 square kilometres (7.05 sq mi) and as of 2011 had a population of 660 people.
