= El Rasillo de Cameros =

- Municipality
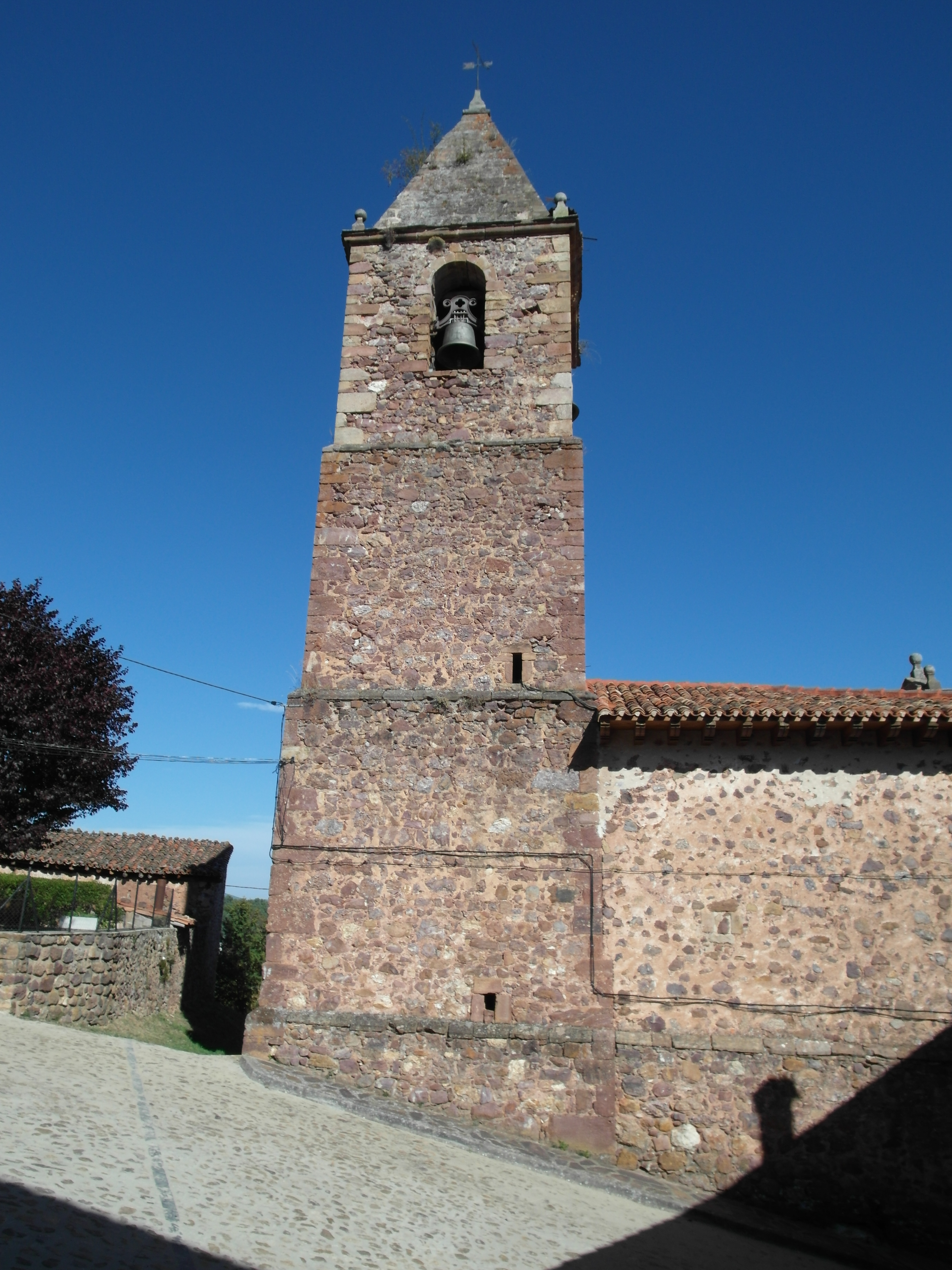
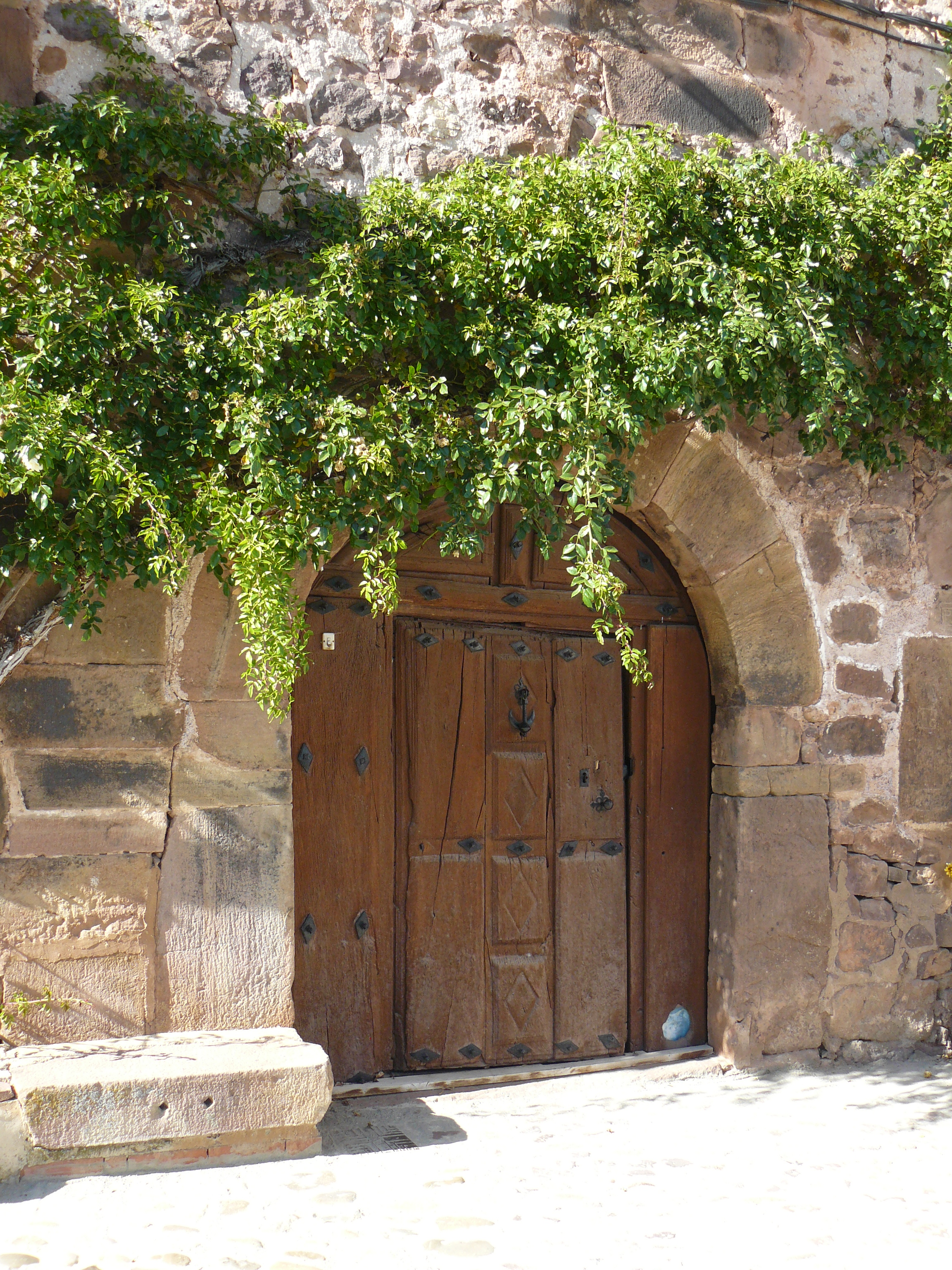
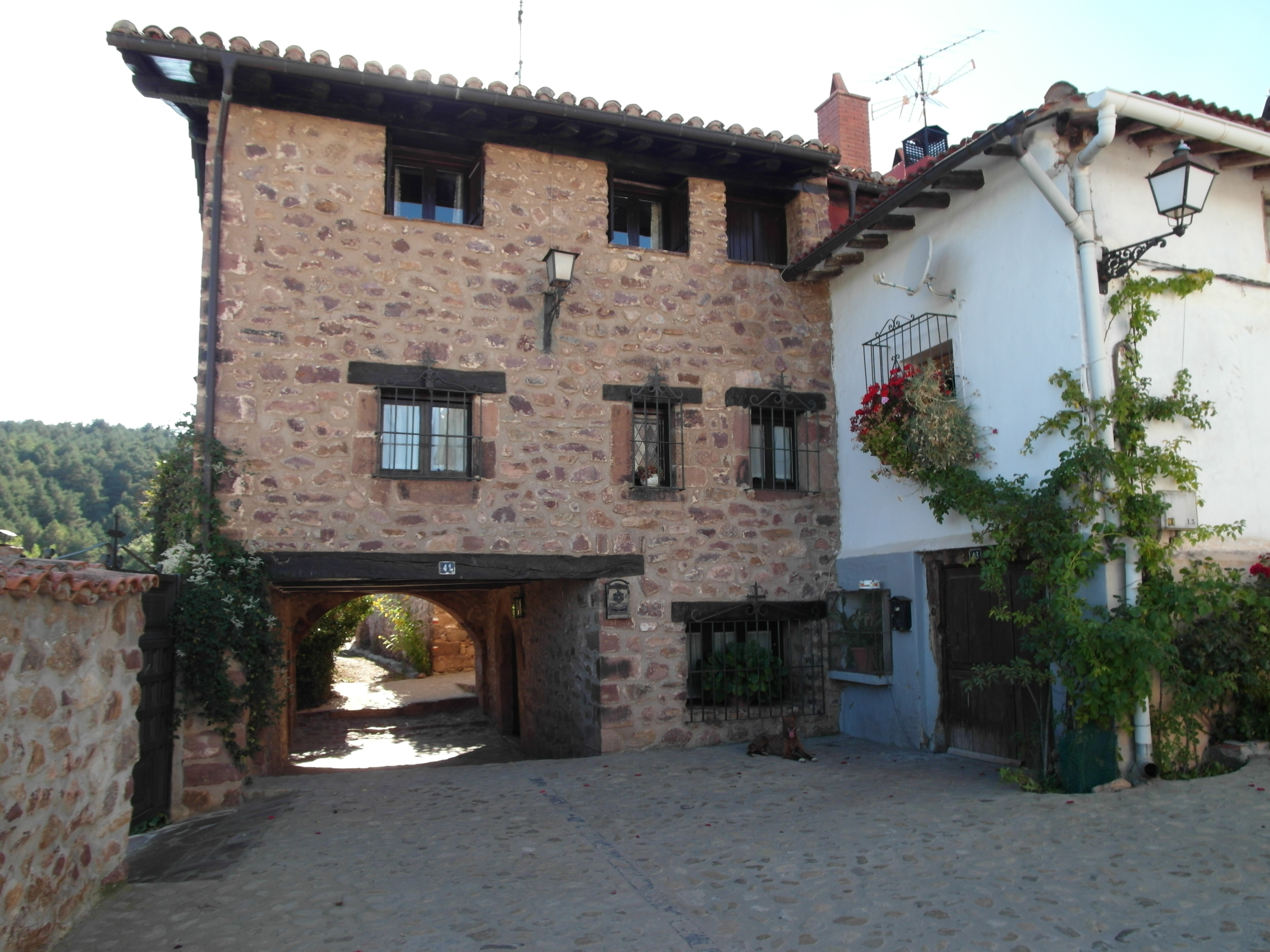
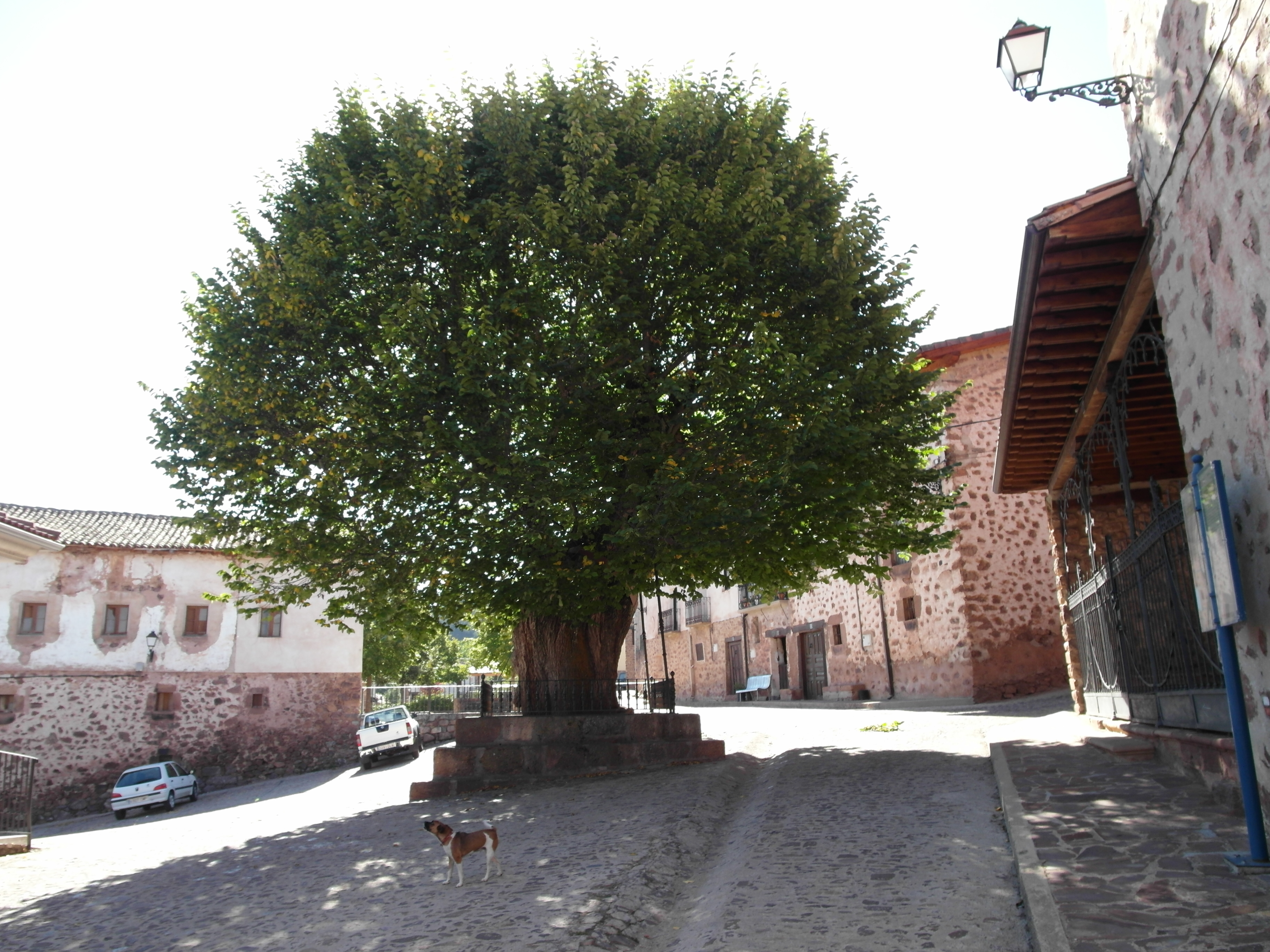
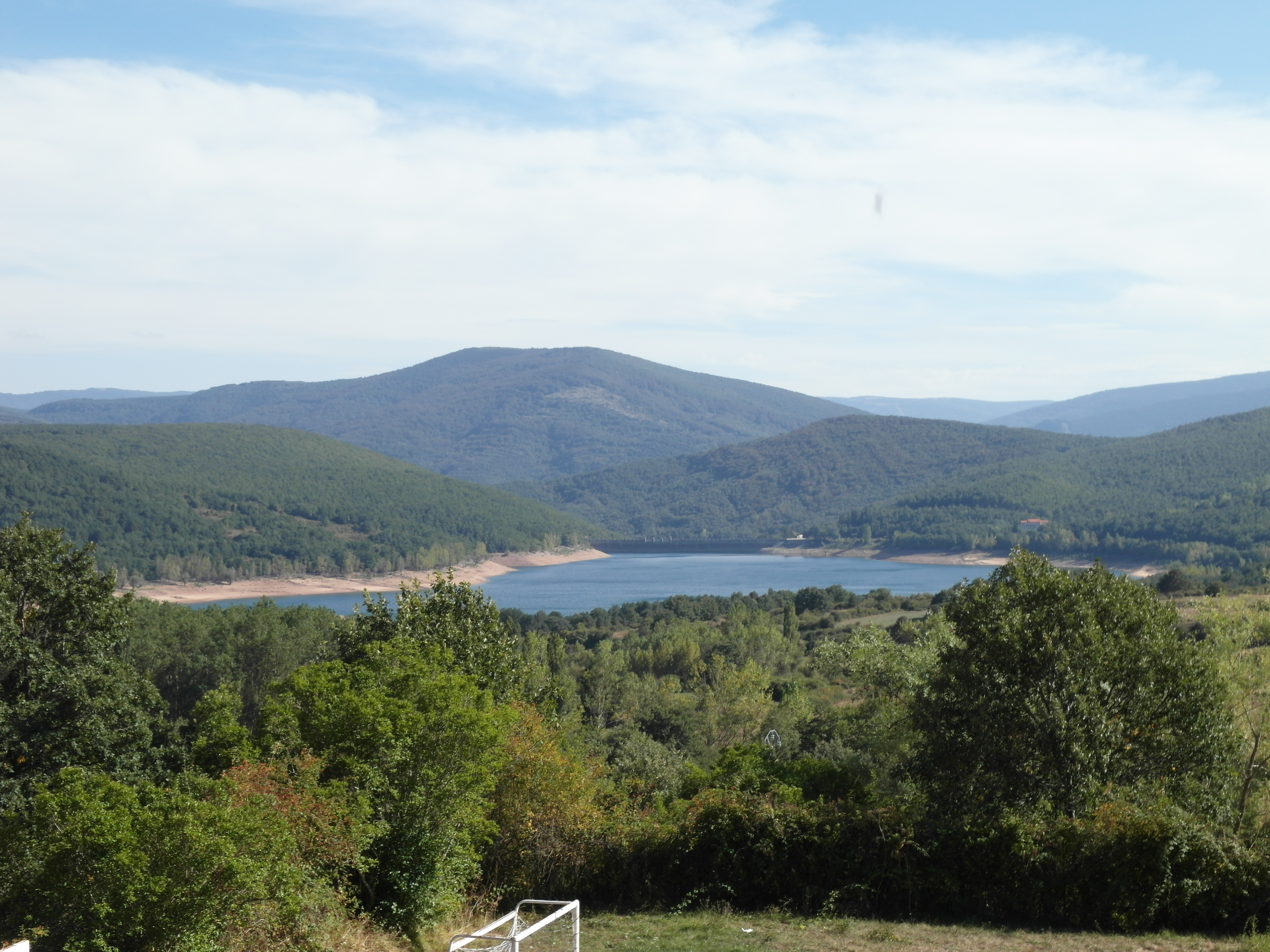

- Location within La Rioja, Spain Location within Spain
- Coordinates: 42°11′40″N 2°41′53″W
- Country: Spain
- Autonomous community: La Rioja
- Comarca: Camero Nuevo

Government
  - Mayor: Francisco Javier Hernández Sáenz (PR+)

Area
  - Total: 15.85 km^{2} (6.12 sq mi)
- Elevation: 1,098 m (3,602 ft)

Population (2025-01-01)
  - Total: 149
- Demonym(s): rasillano, na
- Postal code: 26124
- Website: Official website

El Rasillo de Cameros is a village in the province and autonomous community of La Rioja, Spain. The municipality covers an area of 15.85 square kilometres (6.12 sq mi) and as of 2011 had a population of 150 people.
