= Santurde de Rioja =

- Municipality
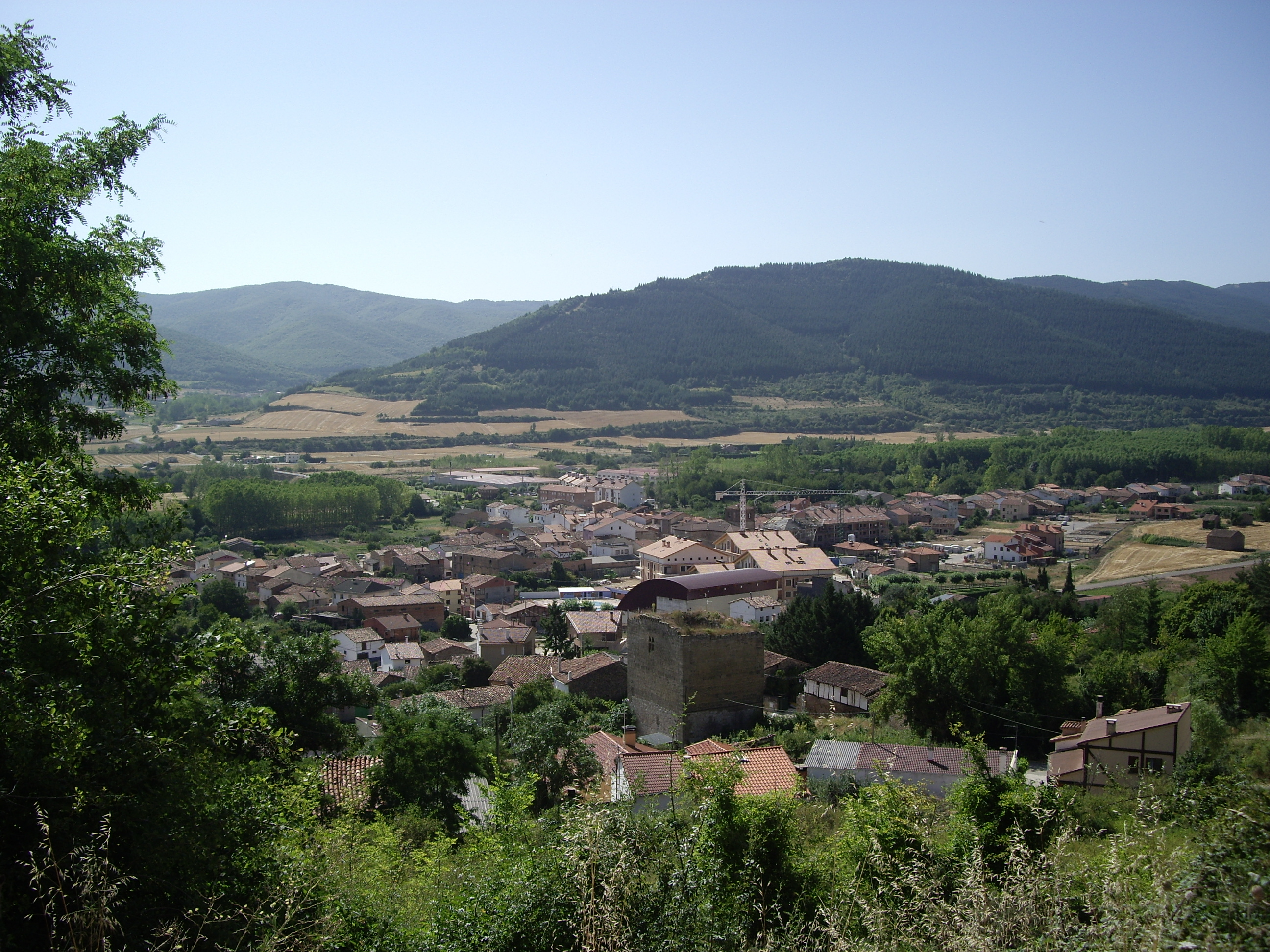
- Skyline of Santurde de Rioja

- Location within La Rioja, Spain Location within Spain
- Coordinates: 42°23′22″N 2°58′48″W
- Country: Spain
- Autonomous community: La Rioja
- Comarca: Santo Domingo de la Calzada

Government
  - Mayor: Isaac Palacios Metola (PP)

Area
  - Total: 15.43 km^{2} (5.96 sq mi)
- Elevation: 714 m (2,343 ft)

Population (2025-01-01)
  - Total: 260
- Demonym(s): santurdeño, ña
- Postal code: 26260
- Website: www.santurdederioja.org

Santurde de Rioja is a village in the province and autonomous community of La Rioja, Spain. The municipality covers an area of 15.43 square kilometres (5.96 sq mi) and as of 2011 had a population of 336 people.
