= Cordovín =

- Municipality
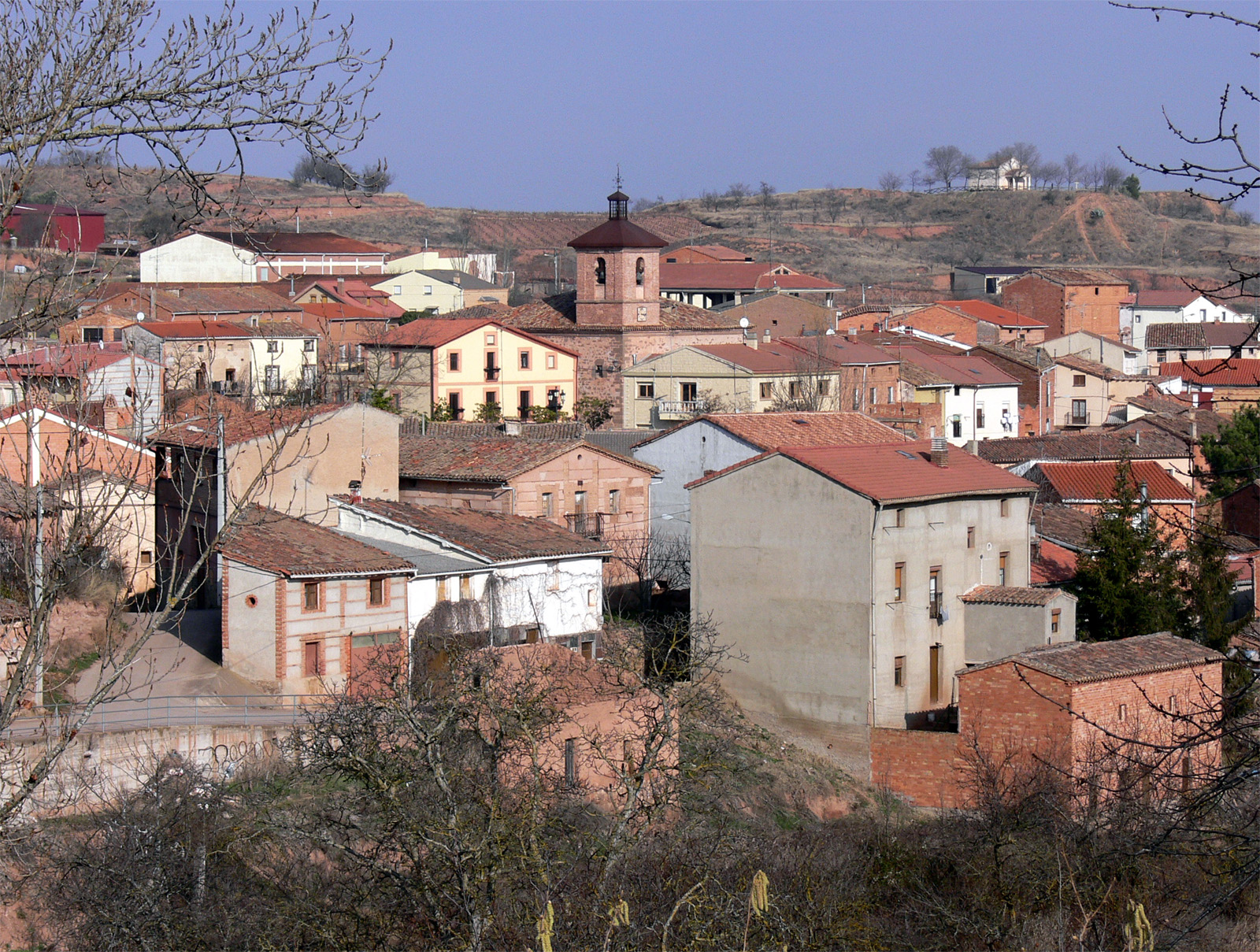
- Skyline of Cordovín

- Coat of arms

- Location within La Rioja, Spain Location within Spain
- Coordinates: 42°23′05″N 2°48′51″W
- Country: Spain
- Autonomous community: La Rioja
- Comarca: Nájera

Government
  - Mayor: Bruno Crescencio Benés Cañas (PR+)

Area
  - Total: 4.60 km^{2} (1.78 sq mi)
- Elevation: 594 m (1,949 ft)

Population (2025-01-01)
  - Total: 154
- Demonym(s): cordovinacho, cha
- Postal code: 26311
- Website: www.cordovin.org

Cordovín is a village in the province and autonomous community of La Rioja, Spain. The municipality covers an area of 4.6 square kilometres (1.8 sq mi) and as of 2011 had a population of 189 people.
