= El Redal =

- Municipality
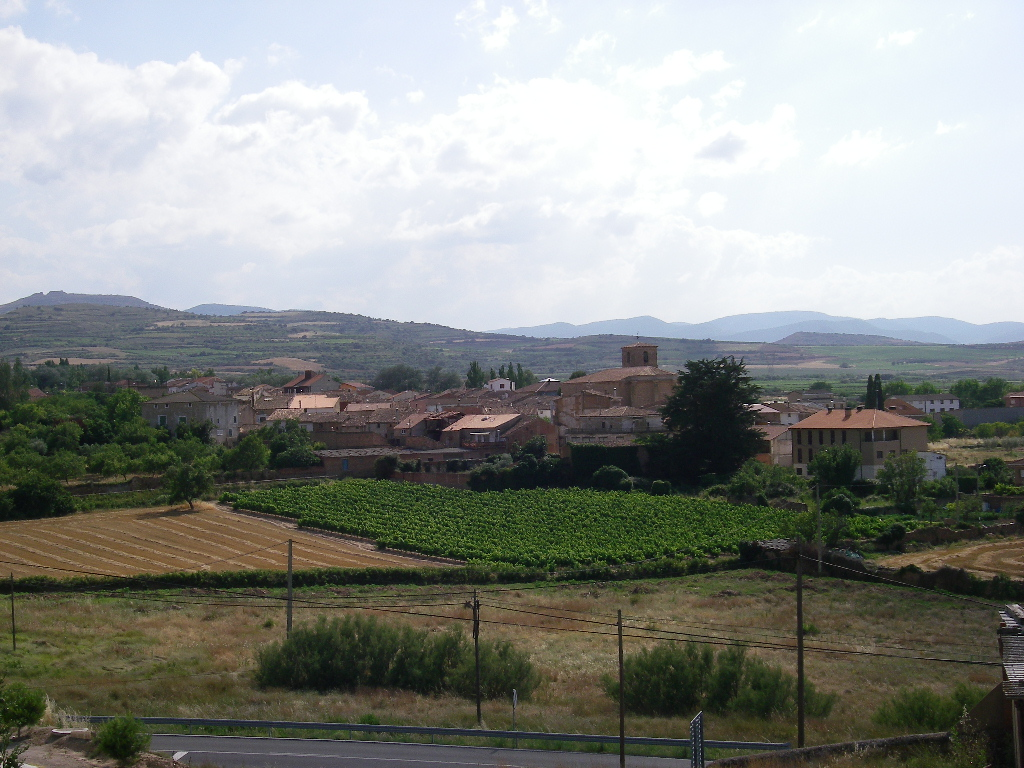

- Location in La Rioja Location in Spain
- Coordinates: 42°20′16″N 2°12′05″W
- Country: Spain
- Autonomous community: La Rioja
- Comarca: Logroño

Government
  - Mayor: José Miguel Cadarso Ruiz

Area
  - Total: 8.21 km^{2} (3.17 sq mi)
- Elevation: 530 m (1,740 ft)

Population (2025-01-01)
  - Total: 138
  - Density: 16.8/km^{2} (43.5/sq mi)
- Demonym(s): Spanish: redaleño, redaleña
- Time zone: UTC+1 (CET)
  - Summer (DST): UTC+2 (CEST)
- Postal code: 26146
- Website: Official website

El Redal is a village in the province and autonomous community of La Rioja, Spain. The municipality covers an area of 8.41 square kilometres (3.25 sq mi) and as of 2011 had a population of 162 people.
