= Uruñuela =

- Municipality
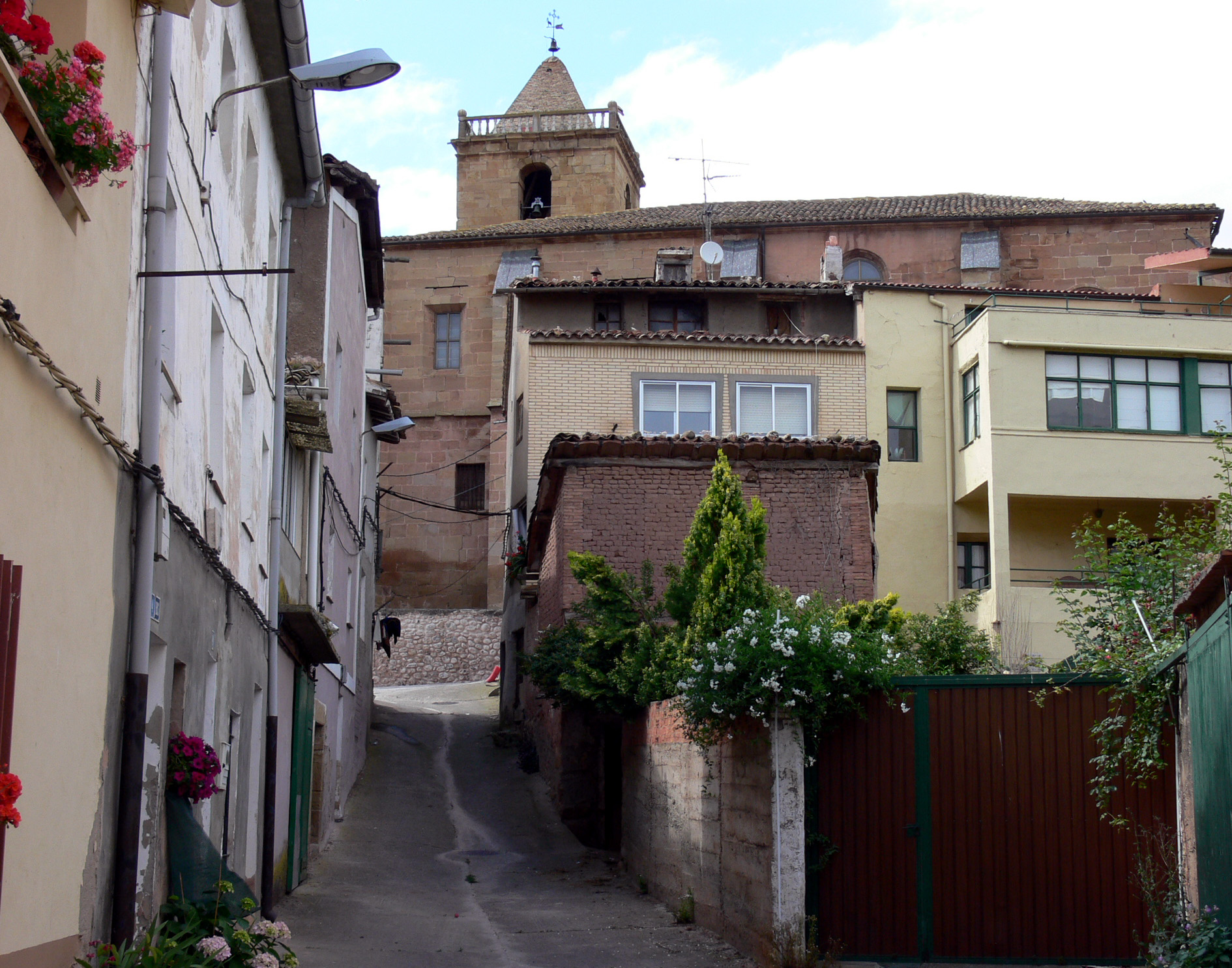
- Street in Uruñuela

- Coat of arms

- Location within La Rioja, Spain Location within Spain
- Coordinates: 42°26′32″N 2°42′26″W
- Country: Spain
- Autonomous community: La Rioja
- Comarca: Nájera

Government
  - Mayor: Carmelo Benito Guinea Pascual (PSOE)

Area
  - Total: 13.9 km^{2} (5.4 sq mi)
- Elevation: 499 m (1,637 ft)

Population (2025-01-01)
  - Total: 1,007
- Postal code: 26313
- Website: www.aytourunuela.com

Uruñuela is a village in the province and autonomous community of La Rioja, Spain. The municipality covers an area of 13.9 square kilometres (5.4 sq mi) and as of 2011 had a population of 952 people.
