= Almarza de Cameros =

- Municipality
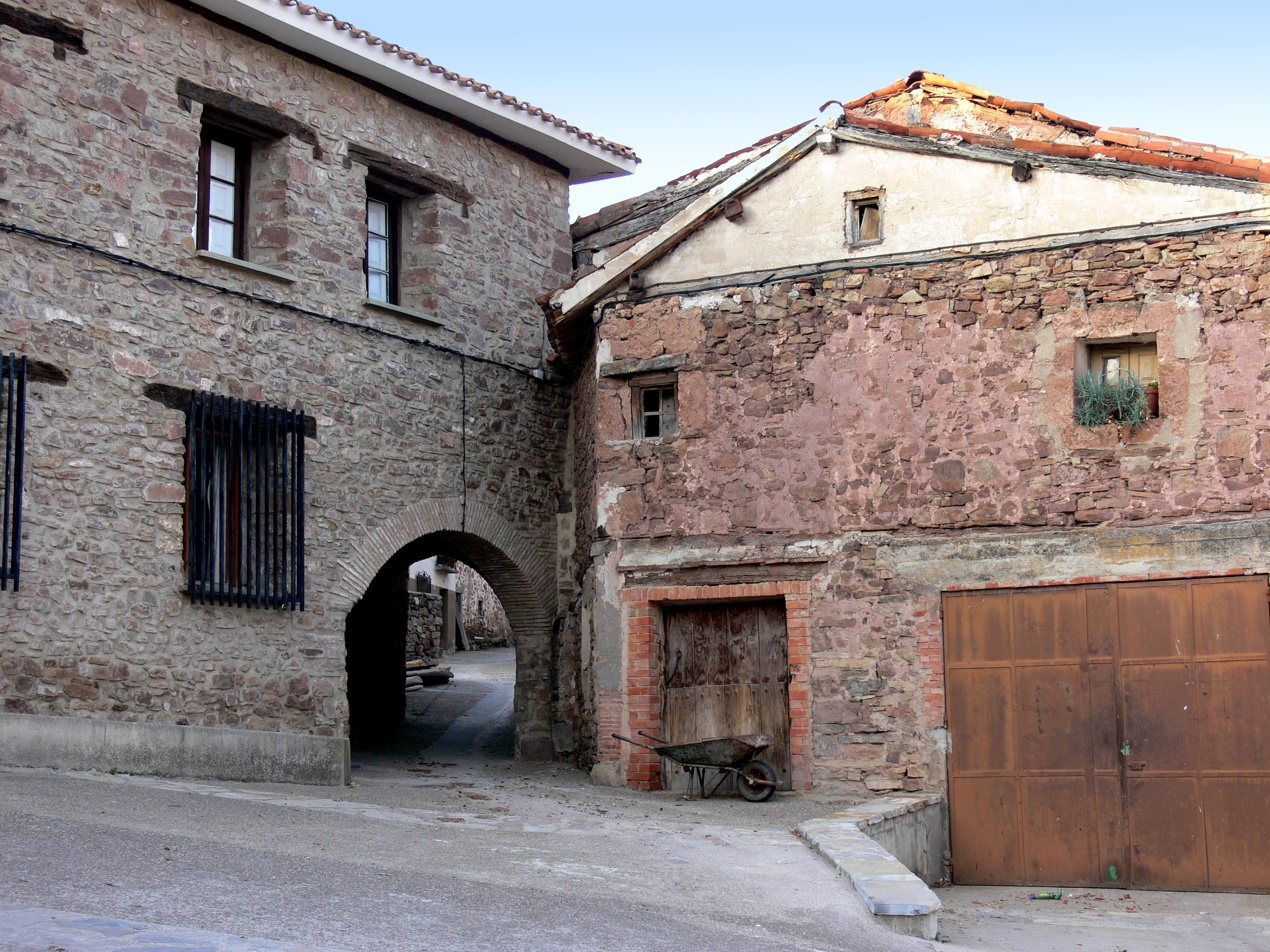
- Main square

- Coat of arms

- Location within La Rioja, Spain Location within Spain
- Coordinates: 42°12′58″N 2°35′53″W
- Country: Spain
- Autonomous community: La Rioja
- Comarca: Camero Nuevo

Government
  - Mayor: José Antonio Garos Martínez (PP)

Area
  - Total: 28.11 km^{2} (10.85 sq mi)
- Elevation: 1,061 m (3,481 ft)

Population (2025-01-01)
  - Total: 41
- Demonyms: almarceño, ña
- Postal code: 26111
- Website: www.almarzadecameros.org

Almarza de Cameros is a village in the province and autonomous community of La Rioja, Spain. The municipality covers an area of 28.11 square kilometres (10.85 sq mi) and as of 2011 had a population of 23 people.
