= Corera =

- Municipality
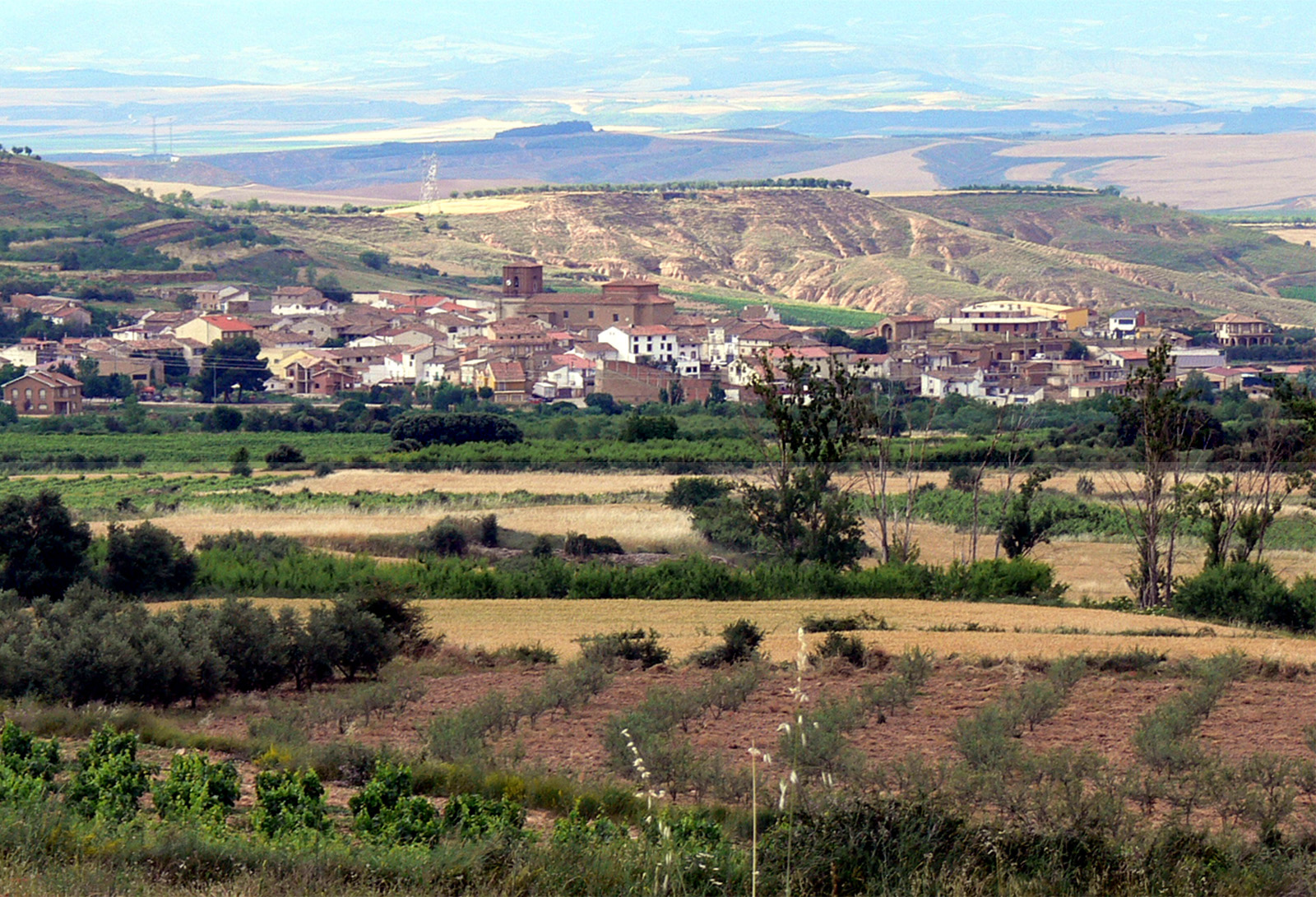
- Skyline of Corera

- Coat of arms

- Location within La Rioja, Spain Location within Spain
- Coordinates: 42°20′N 2°13′W
- Country: Spain
- Autonomous community: La Rioja
- Comarca: Logroño

Government
  - Mayor: Roberto Yécora Sáenz (PSOE)

Area
  - Total: 8.20 km^{2} (3.17 sq mi)
- Elevation: 523 m (1,716 ft)

Population (2025-01-01)
  - Total: 281
- Postal code: 26144
- Website: www.corera.org

Corera is a village and municipality in the province and autonomous community of La Rioja, Spain. The municipality covers an area of 8.2 square kilometres (3.2 sq mi) and as of 2011 had a population of 278 people.
