= Arenzana de Abajo =

- Municipality
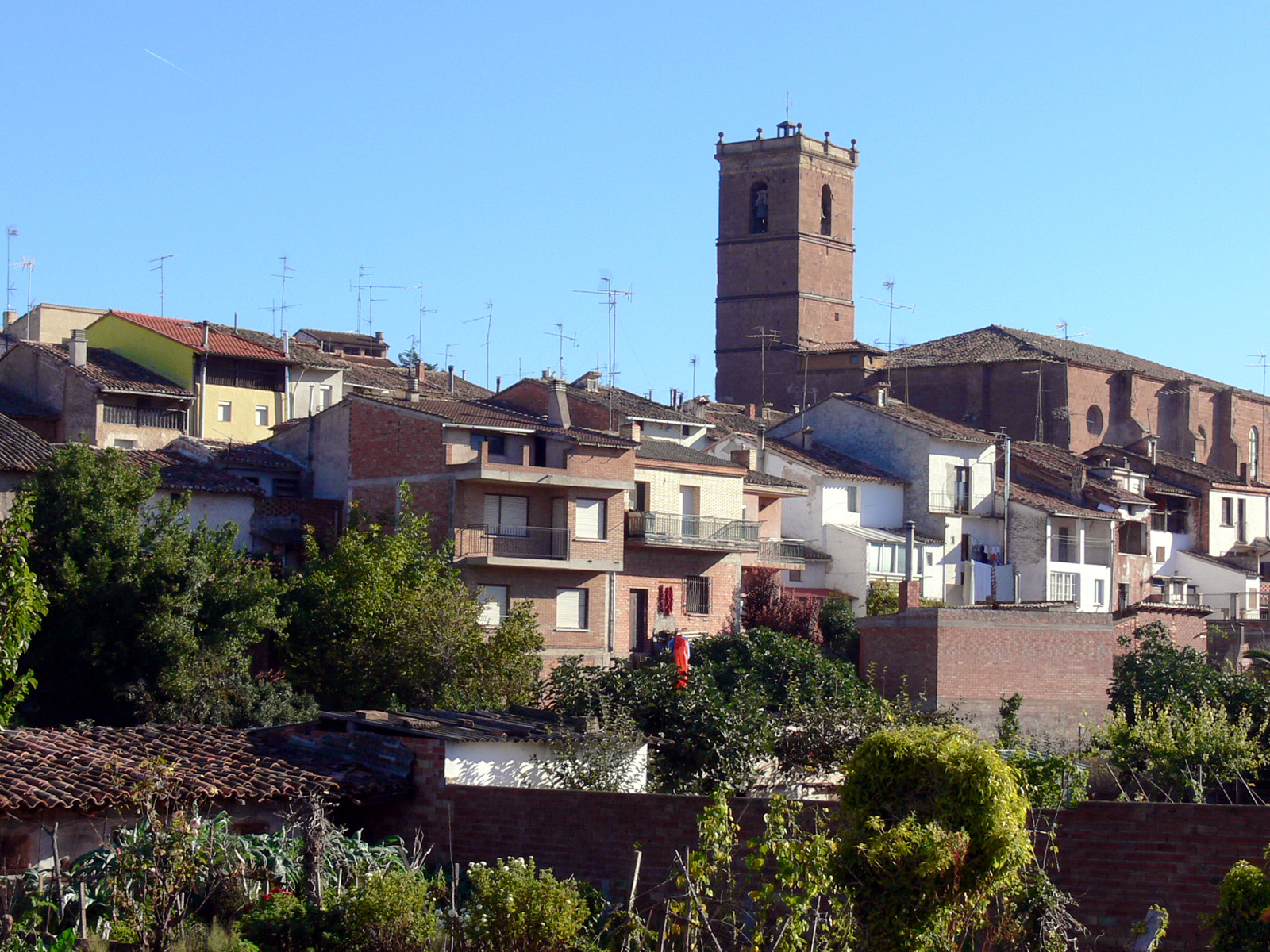
- Skyline of Arenzana de Abajo

- Flag Coat of arms

- Location within La Rioja, Spain Location within Spain
- Coordinates: 42°23′11″N 2°43′08″W
- Country: Spain
- Autonomous community: La Rioja
- Comarca: Nájera

Government
  - Mayor: Purificación Ruiz Monge (PP)

Area
  - Total: 8.39 km^{2} (3.24 sq mi)
- Elevation: 542 m (1,778 ft)

Population (2025-01-01)
  - Total: 257
- Demonyms: zancarrón, na
- Postal code: 26311

Arenzana de Abajo is a village in the province and autonomous community of La Rioja, Spain. The municipality covers an area of 8.39 square kilometres (3.24 sq mi) and as of 2011 had a population of 274 people.

== Politics ==
List of mayors since the democratic elections of 1979
Term	Mayor	Political party
1979–1983	Victorino Martínez Francia	Independent
1983–1987	Javier Fernández Fernández	Independent
1987–1991	Martín Mateo Hernáez	AP
1991–1995	Martín Mateo Hernáez	PP
1995–1999	Ildefonso Francia Lejarraga	PR
1999–2003	Martín Mateo Hernáez	PP
2003–2007	Martín Mateo Hernáez	PP
2007–2011	Carlos Faustino García Fernández	Independent
2011–2015	Purificación Ruiz Monge	PP
2015–2019	Purificación Ruiz Monge	PP
2019–2023	n/d	n/d
2023–	n/d	n/d
