= Pazuengos =

- Municipality
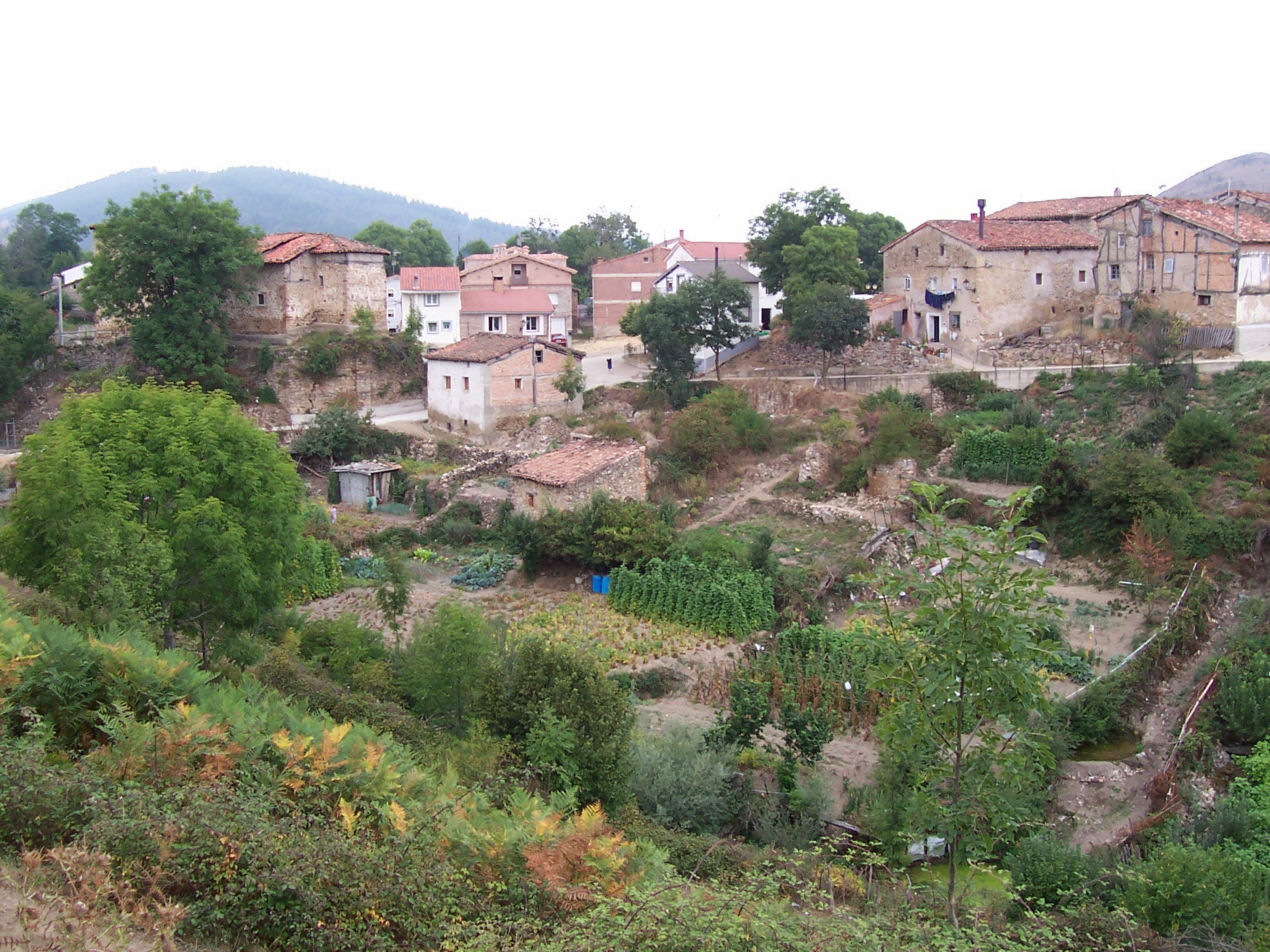
- Skyline of Pazuengos

- Location within La Rioja, Spain Location within Spain
- Coordinates: 42°19′06″N 2°55′32″W
- Country: Spain
- Autonomous community: La Rioja
- Comarca: Ezcaray

Government
  - Mayor: César Somovilla Frades

Area
  - Total: 25.12 km^{2} (9.70 sq mi)
- Elevation: 1,161 m (3,809 ft)

Population (2025-01-01)
  - Total: 24
- Postal code: 26226

Pazuengos is a village in the province and autonomous community of La Rioja, Spain. The municipality covers an area of 25.12 square kilometres (9.70 sq mi) and as of 2011 had a population of 35 people.
