= Nieva de Cameros =

- Municipality
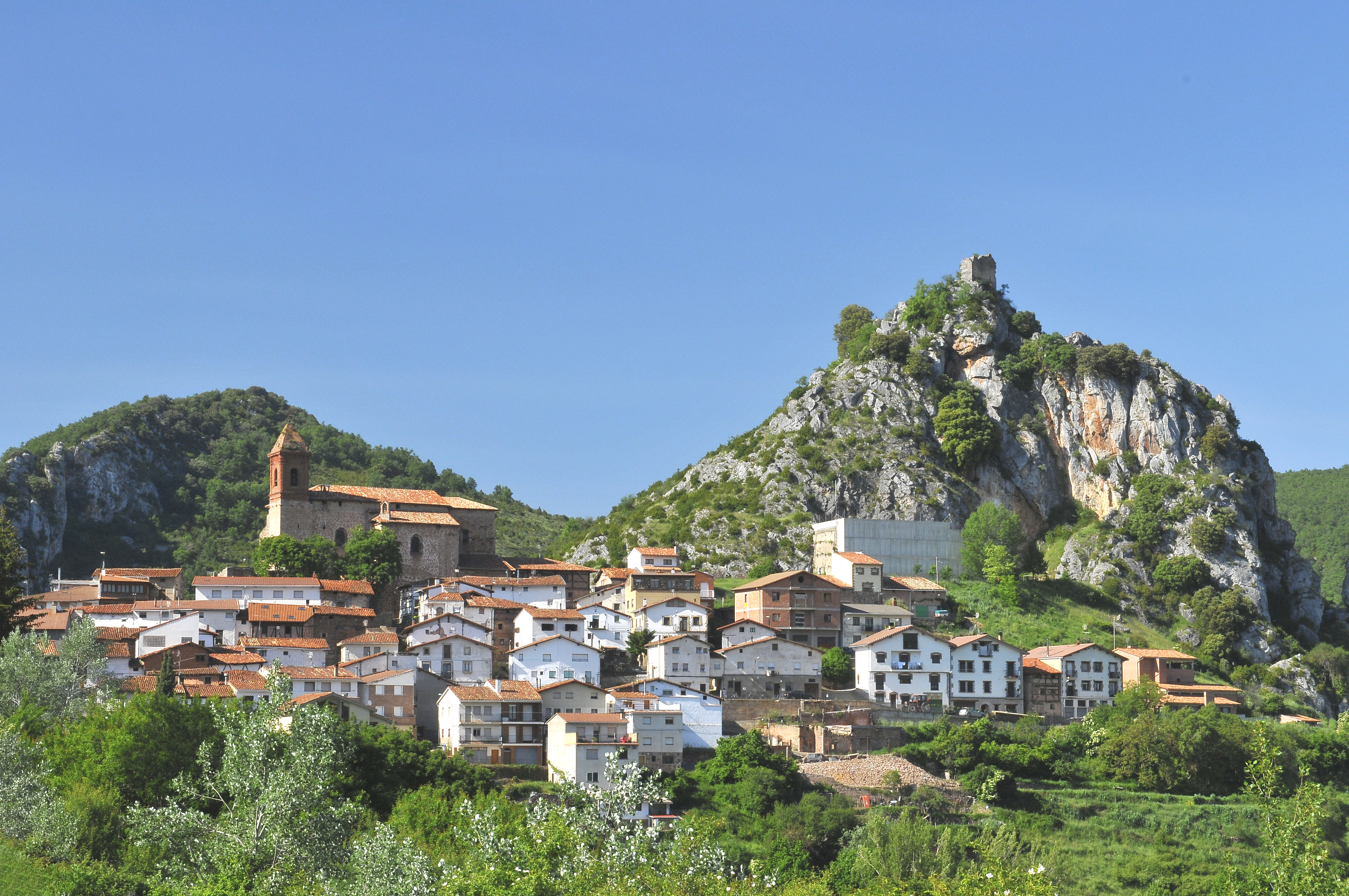
- Skyline of Nieva de Cameros

- Location within La Rioja, Spain Location within Spain
- Coordinates: 42°13′04″N 2°40′00″W
- Country: Spain
- Autonomous community: La Rioja
- Comarca: Camero Nuevo

Government
  - Mayor: José Carlos Fernández Nobajas (PP)

Area
  - Total: 42.05 km^{2} (16.24 sq mi)
- Elevation: 1,017 m (3,337 ft)

Population (2025-01-01)
  - Total: 87
- Demonym(s): nevero, ra
- Postal code: 26124
- Website: Official website

Nieva de Cameros is a village in the province and autonomous community of La Rioja, Spain. The municipality covers an area of 42.05 square kilometres (16.24 sq mi) and as of 2011 had a population of 103 people.
