= Ventrosa =

Ventrosa de la Sierra
- Municipality
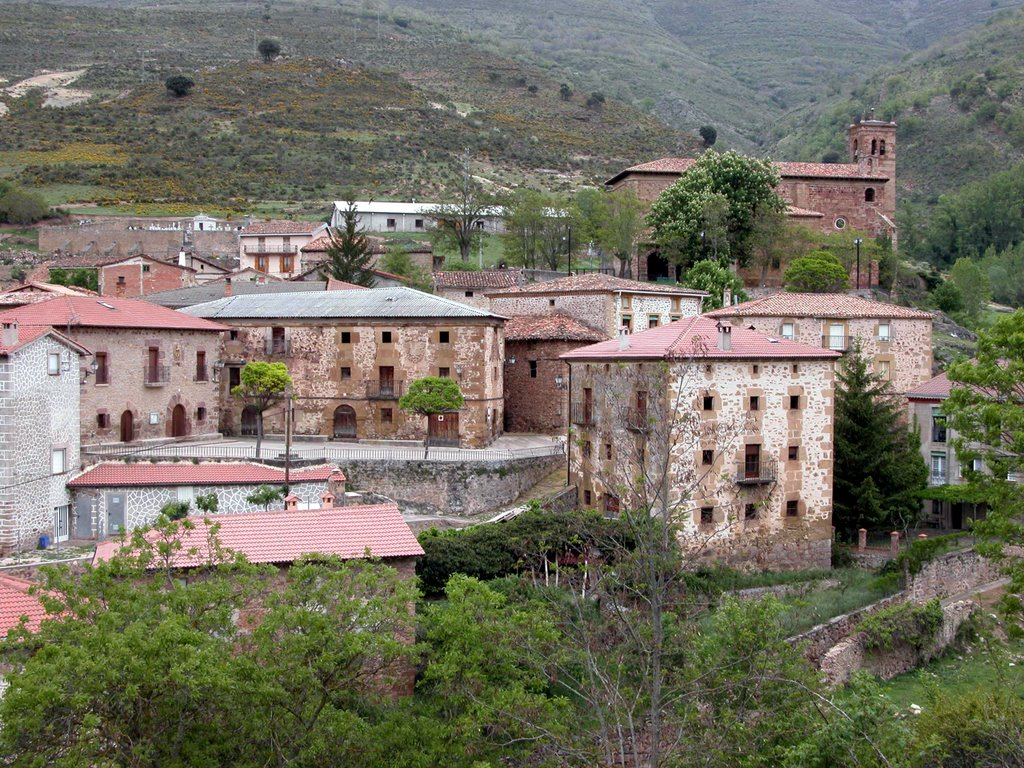
- Skyline of Ventrosa

- Flag Coat of arms

- Location within La Rioja, Spain Location within Spain
- Coordinates: 42°09′24″N 2°51′03″W
- Country: Spain
- Autonomous community: La Rioja
- Comarca: Anguiano

Government
  - Mayor: Carlos Fernández Rueda (PP)

Area
  - Total: 72.93 km^{2} (28.16 sq mi)
- Elevation: 977 m (3,205 ft)

Population (2025-01-01)
  - Total: 48
- Postal code: 26325
- Website: www.ventrosa.net

Ventrosa is a village in the province and autonomous community of La Rioja, Spain. The municipality covers an area of 72.93 square kilometres (28.16 sq mi) and as of 2011 had a population of 68 people.

== Politics ==
List of mayors since the democratic elections of 1979
Term	Mayor	Political party
1979–1983	Vicente Parmo Sáinz	CD
1983–1987	Vicente Parmo Sáinz	AP
1987–1991	Vicente Parmo Sáinz	AP
1991–1995	Vicente Parmo Sáinz	PP
1995–1999	Vicente Parmo Sáinz	PP
1999–2003	Vicente Parmo Sáinz	PP
2003–2007	Vicente Parmo Sáinz	PP
2007–2011	Primo de Pablo Esteban	PP
2011–2015	Primo de Pablo Esteban	PP
2015–2019	Carlos Fernández Rueda	PP
2019–2023	n/d	n/d
2023–	n/d	n/d
