= Hormilleja =

- Municipality
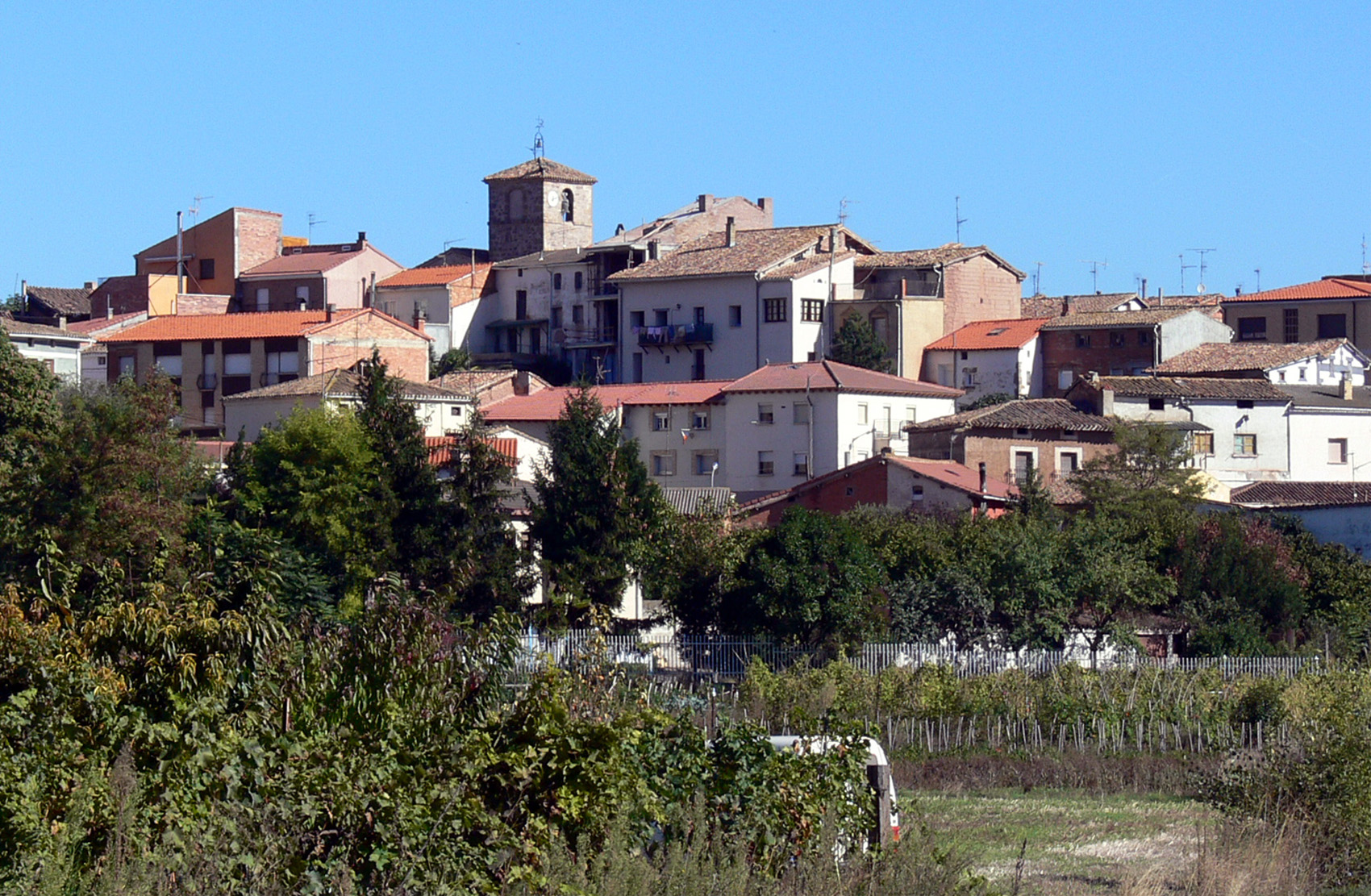
- Skyline of Hormilleja

- Flag Coat of arms

- Location within La Rioja, Spain Location within Spain
- Coordinates: 42°27′20″N 2°43′51″W
- Country: Spain
- Autonomous community: La Rioja
- Comarca: Nájera

Government
  - Mayor: Fernando Varela Treviño (PR+)

Area
  - Total: 7.44 km^{2} (2.87 sq mi)
- Elevation: 494 m (1,621 ft)

Population (2025-01-01)
  - Total: 153
- Postal code: 26223
- Website: Official website

Hormilleja is a village in the province and autonomous community of La Rioja, Spain. The municipality covers an area of 7.44 square kilometres (2.87 sq mi) and as of 2011 had a population of 175 people.
