= Hormilla =

- Municipality
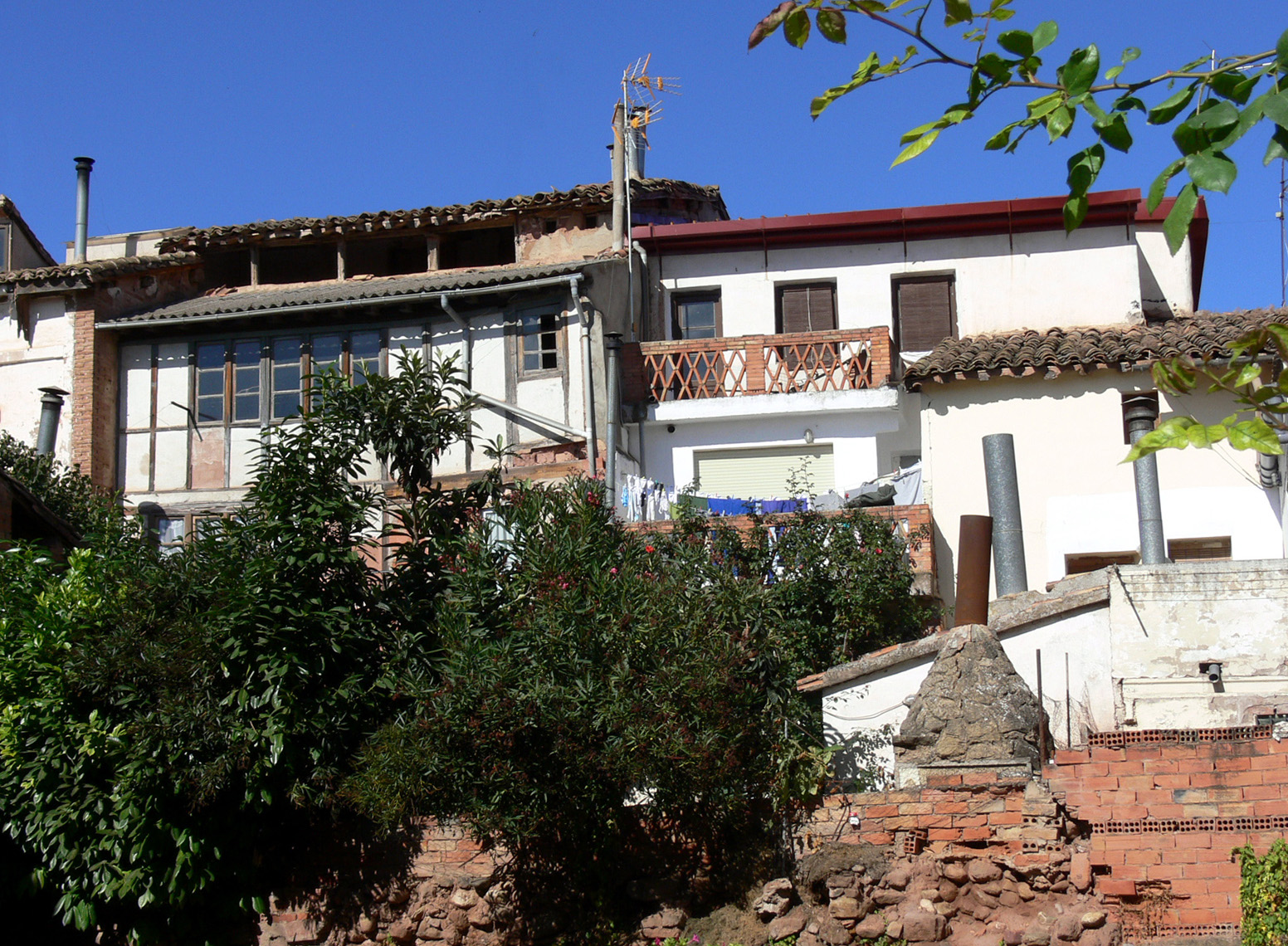
- Hormilla houses

- Flag Coat of arms

- Location within La Rioja, Spain Location within Spain
- Coordinates: 42°26′16″N 2°46′27″W
- Country: Spain
- Autonomous community: La Rioja
- Comarca: Nájera

Government
  - Mayor: Jesús Fernández Treviño (PP)

Area
  - Total: 15.86 km^{2} (6.12 sq mi)
- Elevation: 522 m (1,713 ft)

Population (2025-01-01)
  - Total: 442
- Demonym(s): sardinero, ra
- Postal code: 26323
- Website: www.hormilla.org

Hormilla is a village in the province and autonomous community of La Rioja, Spain. The municipality covers an area of 15.86 square kilometres (6.12 sq mi) and as of 2011 had a population of 453 people.
