= Comarca de Haro =

Haro
- Comarca
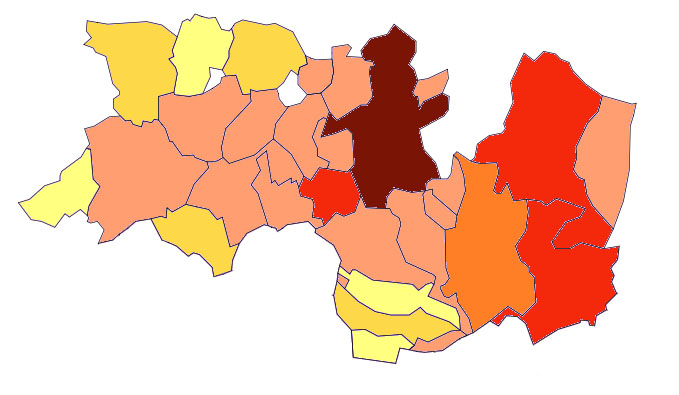
- Interactive map of Haro
- Coordinates: 42.557933°N 2.903479°W
- Country: Spain

Area
  - Total: 444.9 km^{2} (171.8 sq mi)

Haro is a comarca in La Rioja province in Spain.
