= Ledesma de la Cogolla =

- Municipality
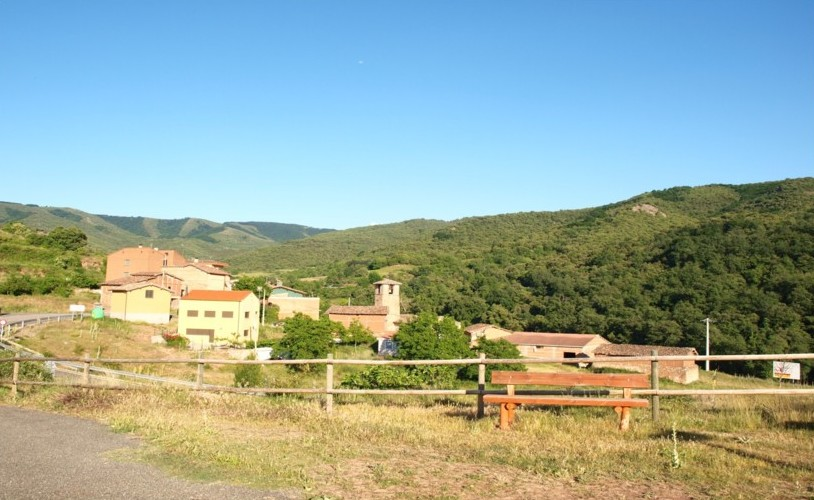
- Skyline of Ledesma de la Cogolla

- Location within La Rioja, Spain Location within Spain
- Coordinates: 42°19′11″N 2°43′05″W
- Country: Spain
- Autonomous community: La Rioja
- Comarca: Anguiano

Government
  - Mayor: Ernesto Hernáez Herreros (PP)

Area
  - Total: 12.13 km^{2} (4.68 sq mi)
- Elevation: 753 m (2,470 ft)

Population (2025-01-01)
  - Total: 16
- Postal code: 26321
- Website: www.ledesmadelacogolla.org

Ledesma de la Cogolla is a village in the province and autonomous community of La Rioja, Spain. The municipality covers an area of 12.13 square kilometres (4.68 sq mi) and as of 2011 had a population of 22 people.
