= La Rioja =

Autonomous community and province of Spain

- Autonomous community and province
- Flag Coat of arms
- Anthem: Anthem of La Rioja
- Location of La Rioja in Spain
- Interactive map of La Rioja
- Coordinates: 42°15′N 2°30′W
- Country: Spain
- Capital: Logroño
- Municipalities: 174

Government
  - Type: Devolved government in a constitutional monarchy
  - President: Gonzalo Capellán (PP)
  - Legislature: Parliament of La Rioja

Area
  - Total: 5,045.09 km^{2} (1,947.92 sq mi)
  - Rank: 16th in Spain
- 1.0% of Spain

Population (2025)
  - Total: 326,803
  - Rank: 17th in Spain
  - Density: 64.7764/km^{2} (167.770/sq mi)
  - Percent: 0.7% of Spain

Demonym
  - English: Riojan
  - Spanish: riojano/a

GDP
  - Total: €11.112 billion (2024)
  - Per capita: €34,086 (2024)
- Time zone: UTC+1 (CET)
  - Summer (DST): UTC+2 (CEST)
- ISO 3166 code: ES-RI/ES-LO
- Official languages: Spanish
- Statute of Autonomy: 9 June 1982
- Congress seats: 4 (of 350)
- Senate seats: 4 (of 266)
- HDI (2022): 0.916 very high · 5th
- Website: Gobierno de La Rioja

La Rioja (Spanish: [la ˈrjoxa]) is an autonomous community and province in Spain. Its capital and largest city is Logroño. Other cities and towns in the province include Calahorra, Arnedo, Alfaro, Haro, Santo Domingo de la Calzada, and Nájera. As of 2025, it had a population of 326,803, making it the least populated autonomous community of Spain.

It covers part of the Ebro valley towards its north and the Iberian Range in the south. The community is a single province, so there is no provincial deputation, and it is organized into 174 municipalities. It borders the Basque Country (province of Álava) to the north, Navarre to the northeast, Aragón to the southeast (province of Zaragoza), and Castilla y León to the west and south (provinces of Burgos and Soria).

The area was once occupied by pre-Roman Berones, Pellendones and Vascones. After partial recapture from the Muslims in the early tenth century, the region became part of the Kingdom of Pamplona, later being incorporated into Castile after a century and a half of disputes. From the eighteenth century the Rioja region remained divided between the provinces of Burgos and Soria, until in 1833 the province of Logroño was created, changing the name of the province to La Rioja in 1980 as a prelude to its constitution under a single provincial autonomous community in 1982. The name "Rioja" (from Río Oja) is first attested in 1099.

The region is well known for its wines under the brand Denominación de Origen Calificada Rioja.

== Etymology ==
The etymology of the toponym Rioja is complex and has been much discussed. The main theories point to different origins: the traditional popular one that makes it correspond to the river Oja, the one that points to the term Rivalia that would be translated as "land of streams", the one that points as germ a nominal tautology in the term rivo Ohia that would mean "river of fluvial bed"; and the very diverse ones that indicate that it would have its origins in the Basque language, for example as union of the words herria and ogia being translated as "land of bread".

Numerous authors from different periods have proposed different theories about it, such as the friar Mateo Anguiano in the 18th century, Ángel Casimiro de Govantes in the 19th century, Menéndez Pidal or Merino Urrutia in the 20th century, or in the 21st century, the researcher Eduardo Aznar Martínez. In addition, there are texts by older authors such as Florián de Ocampo in the 16th century or Rodrigo Méndez Silva in the 17th century, which give an account of the popular etymology of the toponym.

The first written appearances of this toponym as Rioga or Riogam date back to the 11th century, and it can also be found with different spellings such as Rioxa, Riogia, Rivo de Oia, Rivogio or in its definitive form Rioja in texts of later centuries. On the other hand, the oldest document found in which its demonym appears dates from the 13th century, with the spellings riogeñ and riogensi, that is, Riojan (Spanish: riojano).

In the first written appearances of this toponym in the 11th century, the westernmost area of the present-day Spanish region is designated under the same name; therefore, the primitive Rioja was the territory around the basins of the rivers Tirón and Oja, with some divergences in its exact location by different authors. Gradually and as a result of various historical events, the toponym was extended from the Middle Ages, to name a larger region, consisting of seven river valleys, located between the Tirón in the west and the Alhama in the east, which flow into the Ebro, namely La Rioja today.

== History ==
=== Roman and Muslim periods ===
In Roman times, the territory of La Rioja was inhabited by the tribes of the Berones (central country), Autrigones (upper country, extending also north and west of it) and the Vascones (lower country, extending also north and east of it). It was part of the province of Hispania Tarraconensis.

In medieval times, La Rioja was often a disputed territory. The Visigoths created the Duchy of Cantabria that probably included most of La Rioja, as a border march against the Vascones. After the Muslim invasion of AD 711, La Rioja fell into the Muslim domains of Al Andalus.

=== Medieval period ===
Most of the territory was reconquered in 923 by Sancho I of Pamplona, acting for the Kingdom of Pamplona together with the Kingdom of León and the Counts of Castile, feudal lords of the Leonese King. The lower region around Arnedo came under control of his allies the Banu Qasi of Tudela. The territory to the east of the Leza River remained under Muslim control.

Later, there was a dispute between Count Fernán González of Castile and the kings of Pamplona-Navarra, involving great battles. It was decided in favour of the Navarrese after the imprisonment of the Count's family in Cirueña, in 960. La Rioja briefly formed the independent Kingdom of Viguera from 970 to about 1005, at which point it became a part of the Kingdom of Pamplona.

Sancho Garcés moved the capital of the Kingdom of Pamplona to Nájera (La Rioja), creating the so-called kingdom of Nájera-Pamplona which was, due to its large size, the first Spanish Empire. After the independence of Castile in 1035, this new kingdom fiercely fought against Pamplona for the possession of Bureba, La Rioja and other territories. In 1076, after the murder of Sancho IV, Navarre was divided among Castile and Aragon. Castile obtained La Rioja, together with other Navarrese lands. The name "La Rioja" first appears in written records in the Miranda de Ebro charter of 1099. The territory was centred on the fortified site of Logroño: the 12th-century church Iglesia de Santa Maria de Palacio recalls its origin as a chapel of the administrative palace. Logroño was a borderland disputed between the kings of Navarre and the kings of Castile from the 10th century;

From 1134 the Navarrese under García Ramírez ("the Restorer") and his son Sancho VI ("the Wise") fought bitterly with Castile for the recovery of the former Pamplonese domains. The region was awarded to Castile in a judgement by Henry II of England and annexed in 1177. Its importance lay in part in the pilgrimage route to Santiago de Compostela, the Camino de Santiago, which crossed the River Ebro on the stone bridge, the Puente de Piedra.

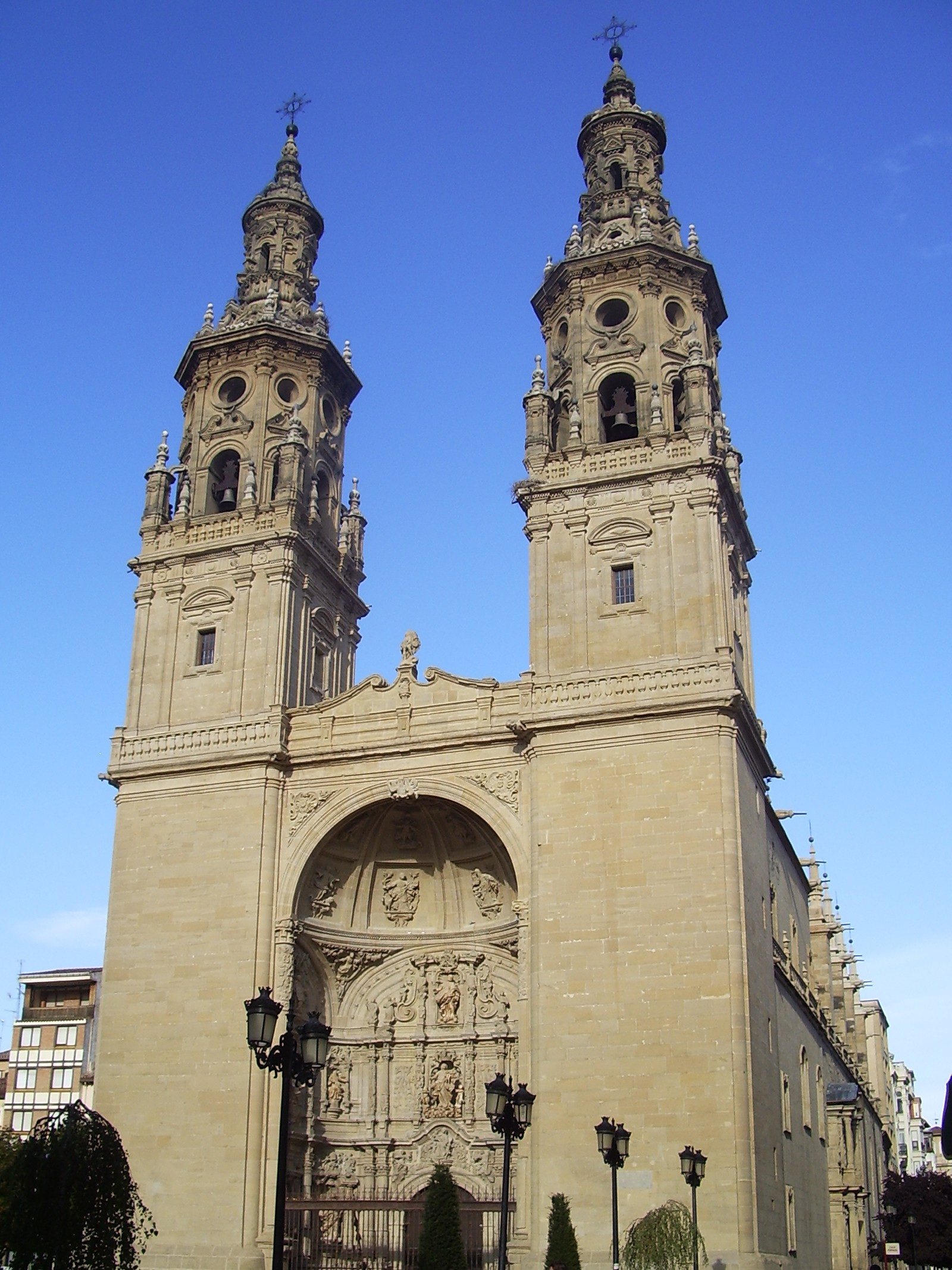
Santa María de la Redonda Co-cathedral, Logroño.

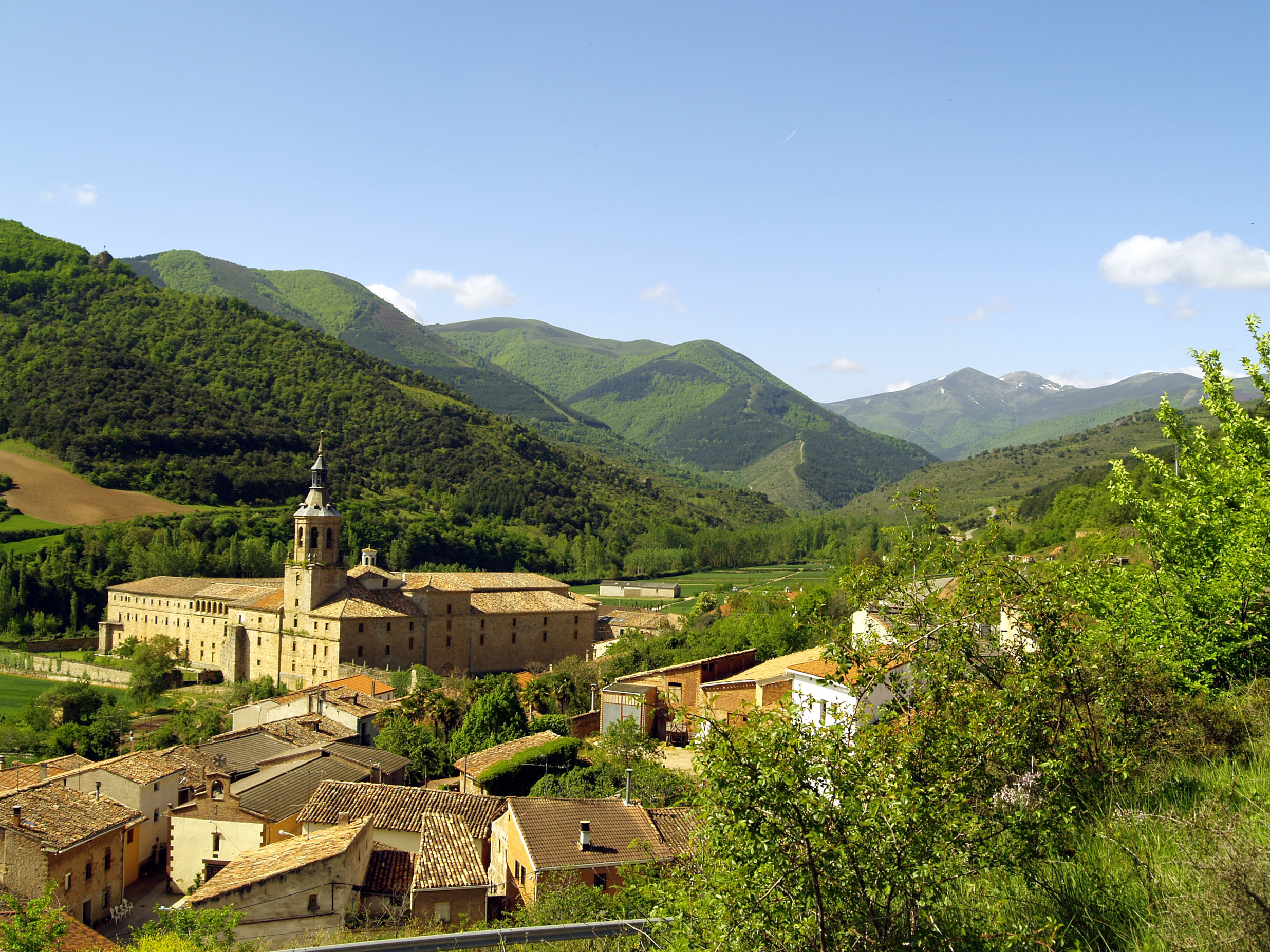
Monasterios de San Millán de Yuso

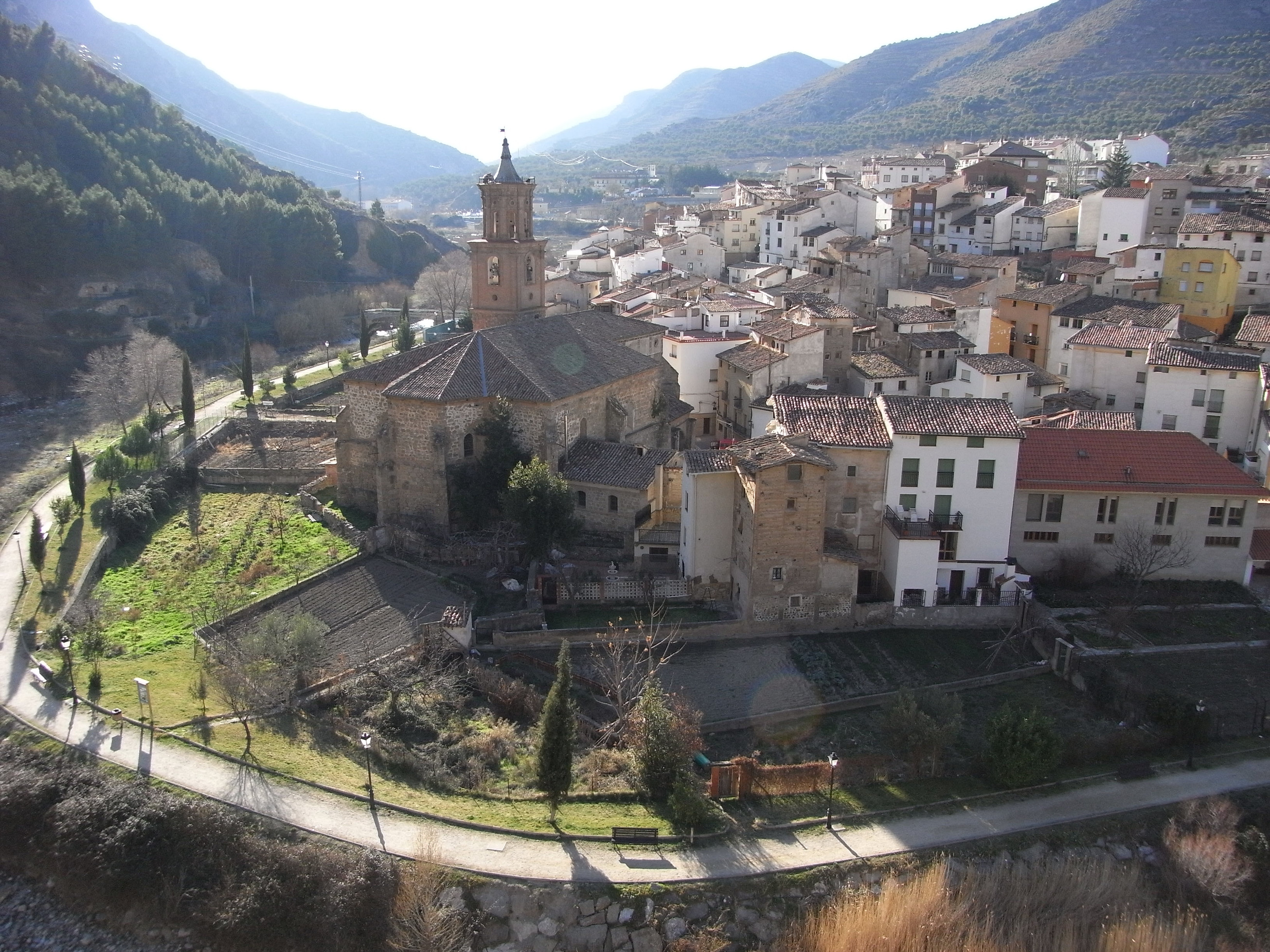
Arnedillo

=== Province of Logroño ===
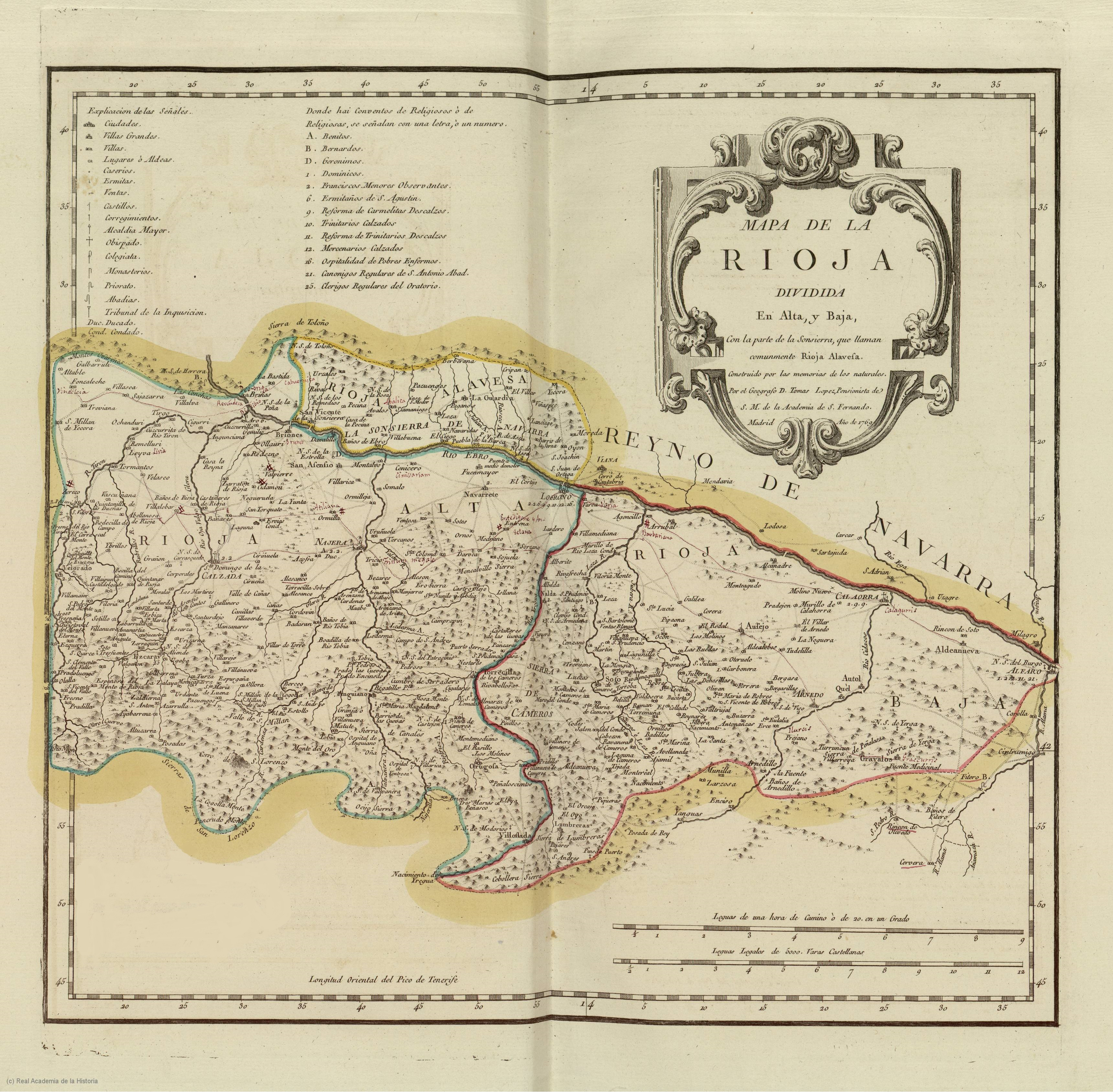
Map of La Rioja by Tomás López de Vargas Machuca, year 1769

In the 18th century, the territory remained divided between the intendences of Burgos and Soria. The region was taken by Napoleonic forces in the Peninsular War and remained solidly in French hands until 1814. In the 1810 project of Llorente it was to be a part of the prefecture of Arlanzón with its capital in Burgos. The Cortes of Cádiz declared La Rioja an independent province at the time of the Liberal Constitution of 1812, and during the Liberal Triennium in January 1822 the province of Logroño was created by royal decree as part of the administrative reform of Riego, taking in the whole of the historical territory of La Rioja. However, Ferdinand VII soon annulled these decisions and restored most of the previous territorial divisions. In the 1833 reorganization, a province of Logroño was again formed within the region of Castilla la Vieja. The province increased its territory temporarily in 1841.

=== Autonomous community ===
In 1980 the province changed its name to La Rioja, and following the adoption of the Estatuto de San Millán in 1982, during the reorganization following the Spanish transition to democracy, it was constituted as a uni-provincial autonomous community. It is the second-smallest autonomous community in Spain and has the smallest population; half of its 174 municipalities have populations under 200. Nearly half of its citizens live in the capital.

== Geography ==
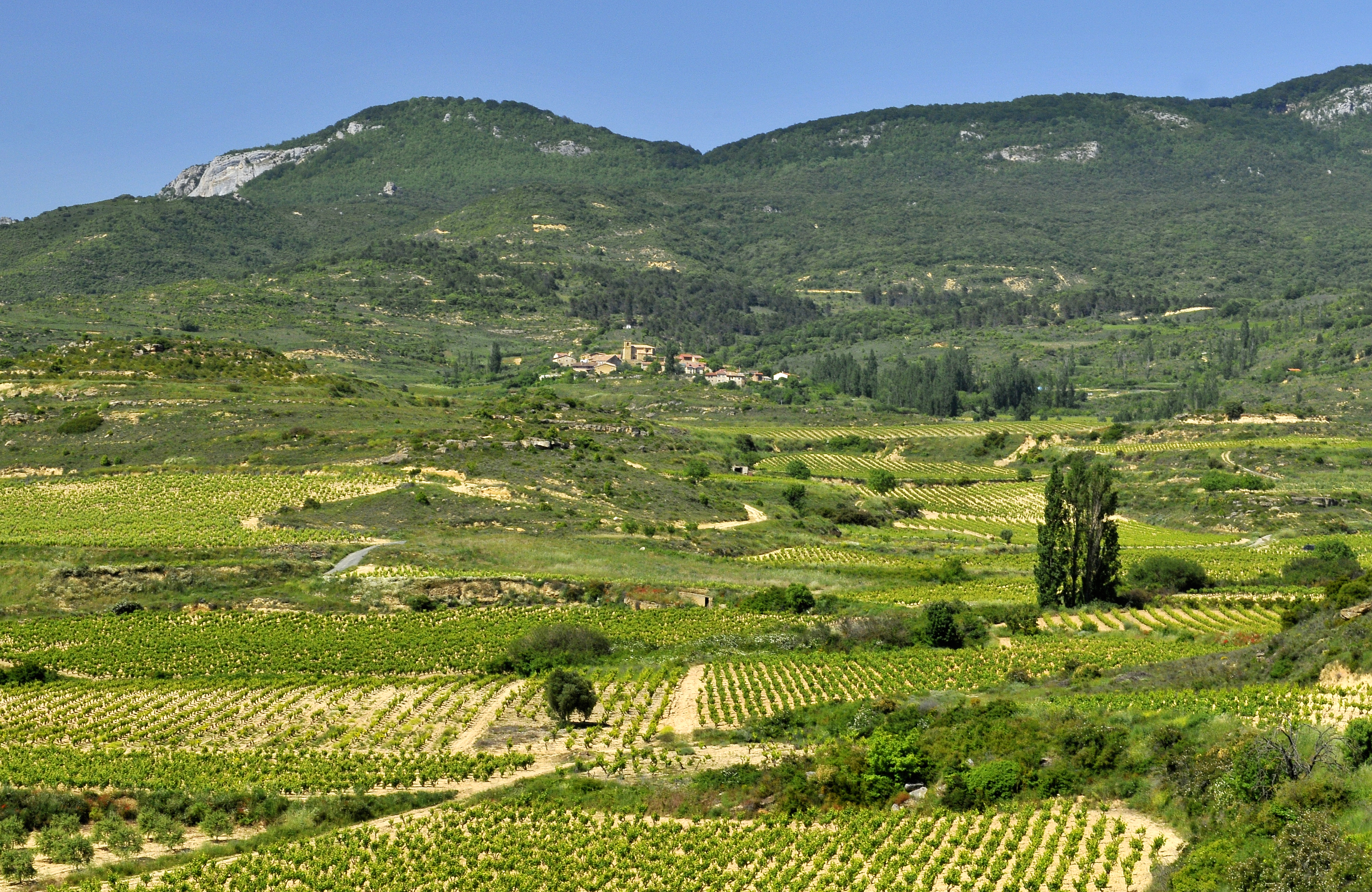
View of La Rioja

La Rioja is bordered by the Basque Country (province of Álava), Navarre, Aragón (province of Zaragoza), and Castile and León (provinces of Soria and Burgos). The river Ebro flows through this region, as does the river Oja, after which it is named.

The Ebro runs through the north of the community. The entire right bank (which is to the south) belongs to La Rioja. There are only three municipalities, Briñas, San Vicente de la Sonsierra and Ábalos on the left bank (known as the Riojan Sonsierra), although Logroño, Agoncillo, Alcanadre, Rincón de Soto and Alfaro also have parts of their respective municipal territories on that bank. Because of their proximity, the Álava area between the Ebro and the Sierra de Cantabria is called Rioja Alavesa.

=== Climate ===
The climate is mainly continental. The Rioja Alta comarca receives more precipitation than Rioja Baja. The average temperature ranges from 11.8 to 31.8 °C (53.2 to 89.2 °F) and the precipitation ranges between 300 and 500 mm (12 and 20 in) as an annual average. The wind called Cierzo is very frequent around La Rioja during the winter.

=== Mountains and mountain ranges ===
The mountains in La Rioja are part of the Iberian System. This mountain range extends to the south of the Ebro river, parallel to it at a distance of about 40 to 60 km (25 to 37 miles), with altitudes ranging between 1,000 and 2,000 m (3,300 and 6,600 feet). From the mountain range the Sierra de la Demanda runs northwards, into the heart of La Rioja, incorporating Monte San Lorenzo which, at 2,271 m (7,451 ft), is the highest peak in the province. Other mountains include Sierra de Camero Viejo, Sierra de Camero Nuevo, Sierra de Cebollera, and Picos de Urbión.

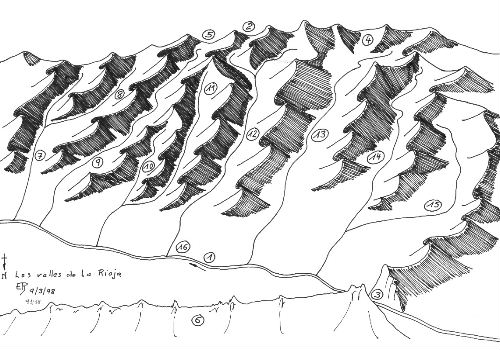
La Rioja and its seven valleys. Drawing by Ernesto Reiner.: 1. Ebro; 2. Puerto de Piqueras; 3. Conchas de Haro; 4. Iberian Range; 5. Puerto de Oncala; 6. Sierras de Cantabria y Codés; 7. Alhama Valley; 8. Linares Valley; 9. Cidacos Valley; 10. Jubera Valley; 11. Leza Valley; 12. Iregua Valley; 13. Najerilla Valley; 14. Oja Valley; 15. Tirón Valley; 16. Logroño

=== Hydrography ===
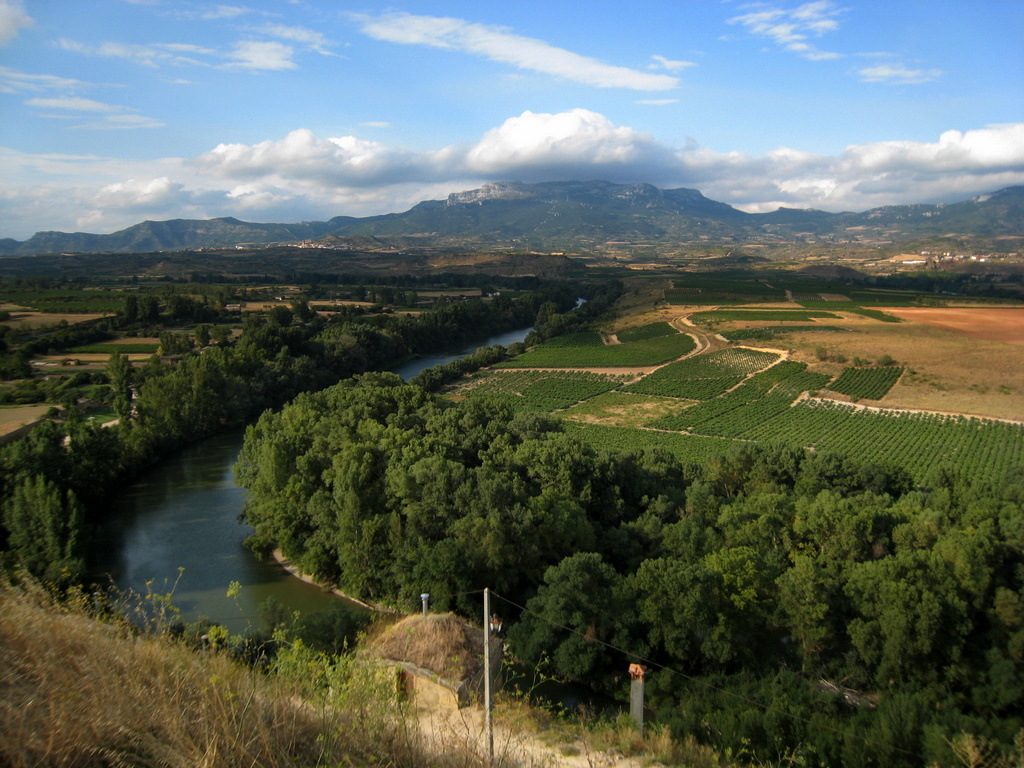
The river Ebro in La Rioja

The Ebro is the main river passing through the community. Emerging from the narrow channel between the rocks of the Conchas de Haro, it reaches La Rioja, through which it runs for 120 km (75 miles), before continuing its journey to the Mediterranean. In the Conchas de Haro the altitude of the river is 445 m (1,460 ft), while at Sotos del Ebro Natural Reserve in Alfaro, where it leaves the community, its elevation is 260 m (850 ft).

Seven rivers flow towards the Ebro from the mountain range, which is why La Rioja is sometimes called: "Zone of the Seven Valleys". They are, from east to west, Alhama, Cidacos, Leza, Iregua, Najerilla, Oja and Tirón, although the headwaters of the Alhama and Cidacos originate in Soria and those of Najerilla-Neila and Tirón are from Burgos. Sometimes Linares (a tributary of Alhama) is added, grouping Tirón with its tributary, the Oja.

The rivers in these valleys form tributaries that flow through valleys including those of Linares, Ocon, Jubera, Tuerto, Brieva, Viniegras and San Millán. The area also contains canyons, including Aguas Buenas, Manzanares, Ardancha, Navajún, Valderresa, Ollora, Tobia, San Martín and others.

=== Flora and fauna ===
In the highlands, oaks, beech and pine are grown. There are also thickets of juniper, boxwood, sloes, holly and cistus. Thyme, rosemary, common juniper, and holm oak are present. There are grand hillsides with fine pasture for livestock, cattle and sheep. In the lower areas there are oaks, olive and almond trees. Near the Ebro, in the plains, the land is used for cereal, sugar beet and potatoes, while the hills are covered with vast vineyards of the wine that has brought worldwide fame to this region.

All Riojan rivers, including the Ebro, have a row of poplars and cottonwood. About the Riojan Alamos Ana Maria Matute has written: "... see them on the edge of the water, turning the landscape, like spears magical pointing towards the unreal and mysterious country of the riverbed."

=== Natural resources ===
Gypsum and silica are mined. Arnedillo is a spa town.

=== Dinosaur footprints ===
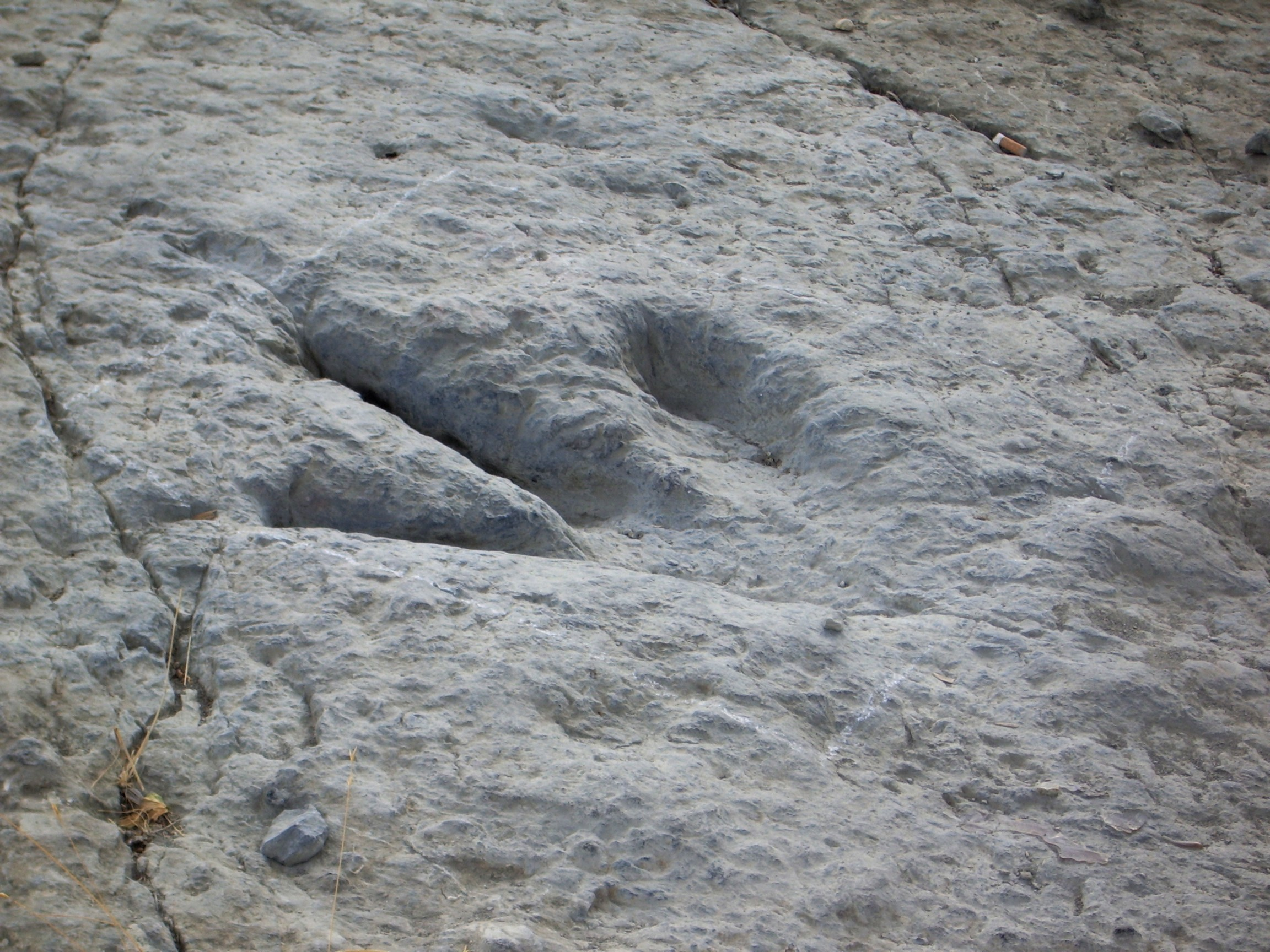
Footprints of a Theropoda found near Enciso.

During the Early Cretaceous period, the geographical area of Cameros was part of a flooded plain that drained periodically, leaving behind muddy areas where dinosaur tracks marked the path. Eventually they were dried and covered with new sediment layers whose weight pressed down on the lower layers, causing them to solidify into rocks over millions of years. Erosion has been wearing down the upper layers making many of these rock formations visible, bringing into view the fossilized footprints. La Rioja is notable for the number and conservation of these sites, in addition to those found in the north of Soria, such as Yanguas, Santa Cruz de Yanguas and other highland locations.

=== Comarcas ===

Geographical comarcas:

- Rioja Alta
  - Comarca de Anguiano
  - Comarca de Ezcaray
  - Comarca de Haro
  - Comarca de Nájera
  - Comarca de Santo Domingo de la Calzada
- Rioja Media
  - Tierra de Cameros
    - Camero Nuevo
    - Camero Viejo
  - Comarca de Logroño
- Rioja Baja
  - Comarca de Cervera
  - Comarca de Alfaro
  - Comarca de Arnedo
  - Comarca de Calahorra

== Administration ==
The current President of La Rioja is Gonzalo Capellán of PP. The autonomous community has its own Parliament. Other organs include the Consejo de Gobierno (council of government) and the Tribunal Superior de Justicia (high court of justice).

=== Municipalities ===
La Rioja has 174 municipalities:

- Ábalos
- Agoncillo
- Aguilar del Río Alhama
- Ajamil
- Albelda de Iregua
- Alberite
- Alcanadre
- Aldeanueva de Ebro
- Alesanco
- Alesón
- Alfaro
- Almarza de Cameros
- Anguciana
- Anguiano
- Arenzana de Abajo
- Arenzana de Arriba
- Arnedillo
- Arnedo
- Arrúbal
- Ausejo
- Autol
- Azofra
- Badarán
- Bañares
- Baños de Río Tobía
- Baños de Rioja
- Berceo
- Bergasa
- Bergasillas Bajera
- Bezares
- Bobadilla
- Brieva de Cameros
- Briñas
- Briones
- Cabezón de Cameros
- Calahorra
- Camprovín
- Canales de la Sierra
- Cañas
- Canillas de Río Tuerto
- Cárdenas
- Casalarreina
- Castañares de Rioja
- Castroviejo
- Cellorigo
- Cenicero
- Cervera del Río Alhama
- Cidamón
- Cihuri
- Cirueña
- Clavijo
- Cordovín
- Corera
- Cornago
- Corporales
- Cuzcurrita de Río Tirón
- Daroca de Rioja
- El Rasillo de Cameros
- El Redal
- El Villar de Arnedo
- Enciso
- Entrena
- Estollo
- Ezcaray
- Foncea
- Fonzaleche
- Fuenmayor
- Galbárruli
- Galilea
- Gallinero de Cameros
- Gimileo
- Grañón
- Grávalos
- Haro
- Herce
- Herramélluri
- Hervías
- Hormilla
- Hormilleja
- Hornillos de Cameros
- Hornos de Moncalvillo
- Huércanos
- Igea
- Jalón de Cameros
- Laguna de Cameros
- Lagunilla del Jubera
- Lardero
- Ledesma de la Cogolla
- Leiva
- Leza de Río Leza
- Logroño
- Lumbreras
- Manjarrés
- Mansilla de la Sierra
- Manzanares de Rioja
- Matute
- Medrano
- Munilla
- Murillo de Río Leza
- Muro de Aguas
- Muro en Cameros
- Nájera
- Nalda
- Navajún
- Navarrete
- Nestares
- Nieva de Cameros
- Ochánduri
- Ocón
- Ojacastro
- Ollauri
- Ortigosa de Cameros
- Pazuengos
- Pedroso
- Pinillos
- Pradejón
- Pradillo
- Préjano
- Quel
- Rabanera
- Ribafrecha
- Rincón de Soto
- Robres del Castillo
- Rodezno
- Sajazarra
- San Asensio
- San Millán de la Cogolla
- San Millán de Yécora
- San Román de Cameros
- San Torcuato
- San Vicente de la Sonsierra
- Santa Coloma
- Santa Engracia del Jubera
- Santa Eulalia Bajera
- Santo Domingo de la Calzada
- Santurde de Rioja
- Santurdejo
- Sojuela
- Sorzano
- Sotés
- Soto en Cameros
- Terroba
- Tirgo
- Tobía
- Tormantos
- Torre en Cameros
- Torrecilla en Cameros
- Torrecilla sobre Alesanco
- Torremontalbo
- Treviana
- Tricio
- Tudelilla
- Uruñuela
- Valdemadera
- Valgañón
- Ventosa
- Ventrosa
- Viguera
- Villalba de Rioja
- Villalobar de Rioja
- Villamediana de Iregua
- Villanueva de Cameros
- Villar de Torre
- Villarejo
- Villarroya
- Villarta-Quintana
- Villavelayo
- Villaverde de Rioja
- Villoslada de Cameros
- Viniegra de Abajo
- Viniegra de Arriba
- Zarratón
- Zarzosa
- Zorraquín

== Demographics ==
Historical population
| Year | Pop. | ±% |
|---|---|---|
| 1842 | 147,732 | — |
| 1857 | 173,884 | +17.7% |
| 1877 | 175,020 | +0.7% |
| 1887 | 183,430 | +4.8% |
| 1900 | 190,819 | +4.0% |
| 1910 | 190,985 | +0.1% |
| 1920 | 198,850 | +4.1% |
| 1930 | 207,262 | +4.2% |
| 1940 | 225,037 | +8.6% |
| 1950 | 231,010 | +2.7% |
| 1960 | 231,177 | +0.1% |
| 1970 | 234,628 | +1.5% |
| 1981 | 254,349 | +8.4% |
| 1991 | 263,434 | +3.6% |
| 2001 | 276,702 | +5.0% |
| 2011 | 321,173 | +16.1% |
| 2021 | 319,444 | −0.5% |
Source: INE

As of 2025, the population is 326,803, of which 49.3% are males, and 50.7% are females. Minors make up 16.3% of the population, and seniors make up 22.5%. Its capital, Logroño, with approximately 151,681 inhabitants, is its most populous city.

Out of La Rioja's 174 municipalities, there are more men than women in 156 of them, in 3 the numbers are the same and in 15 there are more females than males. In the latter set, the differences are small, except in the capital where there are 8,453 more women than men.

=== Immigration ===
As of 2025, immigrants make up 18.8% of the population. The 5 largest foreign countries of birth are Morocco, Colombia, Romania, Ecuador, and Pakistan.

Foreign population by country of birth (2025)
| Country of birth | Population | Country of birth | Population |
|---|---|---|---|
| Morocco | 10,941 | Georgia | 1,184 |
| Colombia | 9,875 | Peru | 1,167 |
| Romania | 8,912 | Brazil | 973 |
| Ecuador | 3,427 | Algeria | 876 |
| Pakistan | 2,915 | Dominican Republic | 734 |
| Venezuela | 2,599 | Ukraine | 728 |
| Bolivia | 2,290 | France | 678 |
| Portugal | 1,744 | China | 629 |
| Argentina | 1,711 | Honduras | 625 |
| Cuba | 1,267 | Bulgaria | 538 |

=== Major cities and towns ===
Largest municipalities in La Rioja INE – 2025
| Rank | Name | Pop. | Rank | Name | Pop. |
|---|---|---|---|---|---|
| 1 | Logroño | 151,681 | 11 | Rincón de Soto | 4,035 |
| 2 | Calahorra | 25,292 | 12 | Albelda de Iregua | 3,953 |
| 3 | Arnedo | 15,076 | 13 | Pradejón | 3,715 |
| 4 | Haro | 12,153 | 14 | Fuenmayor | 3,270 |
| 5 | Lardero | 12,100 | 15 | Navarrete | 3,066 |
| 6 | Alfaro | 9,969 | 16 | Aldeanueva de Ebro | 2,770 |
| 7 | Villamediana de Iregua | 9,243 | 17 | Alberite | 2,758 |
| 8 | Nájera | 8,313 | 18 | Cervera del Río Alhama | 2,249 |
| 9 | Santo Domingo de la Calzada | 6,428 | 19 | Cenicero | 2,176 |
| 10 | Autol | 4,925 | 20 | Quel | 2,113 |

== Economy ==
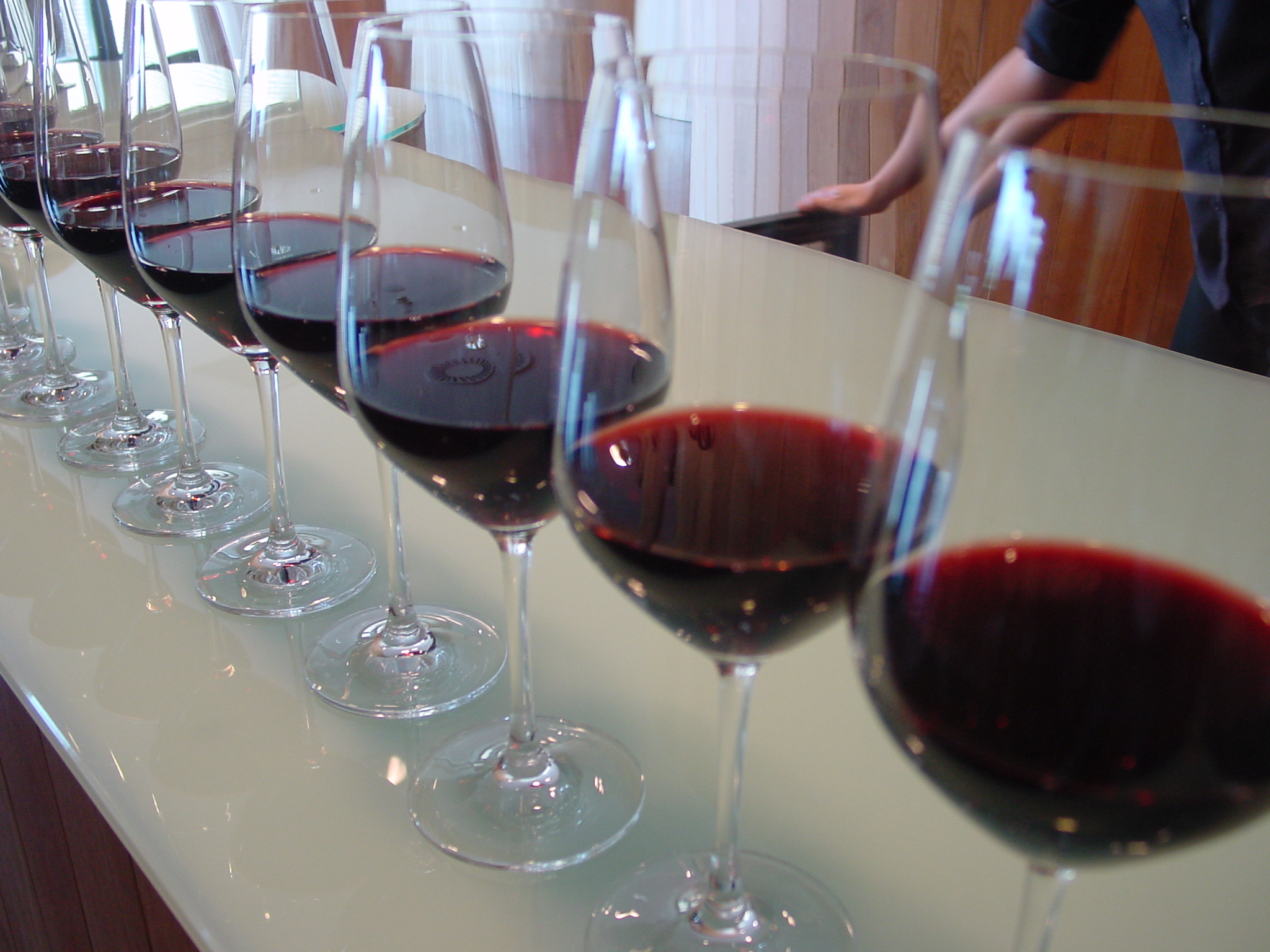
Glasses of wine for tasting in the Vivancos Museum

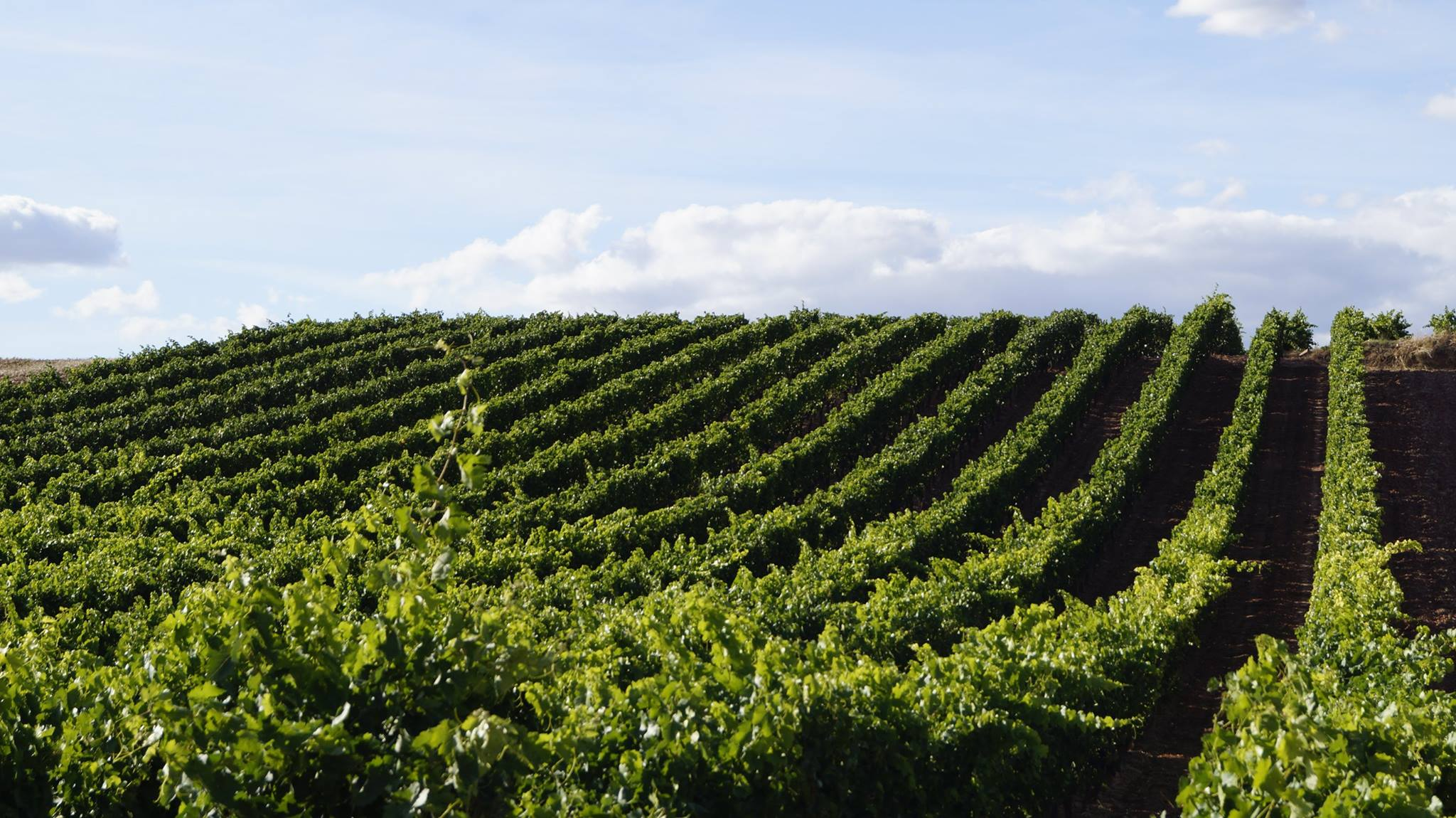
Vineyards (Viñedos) in La Rioja

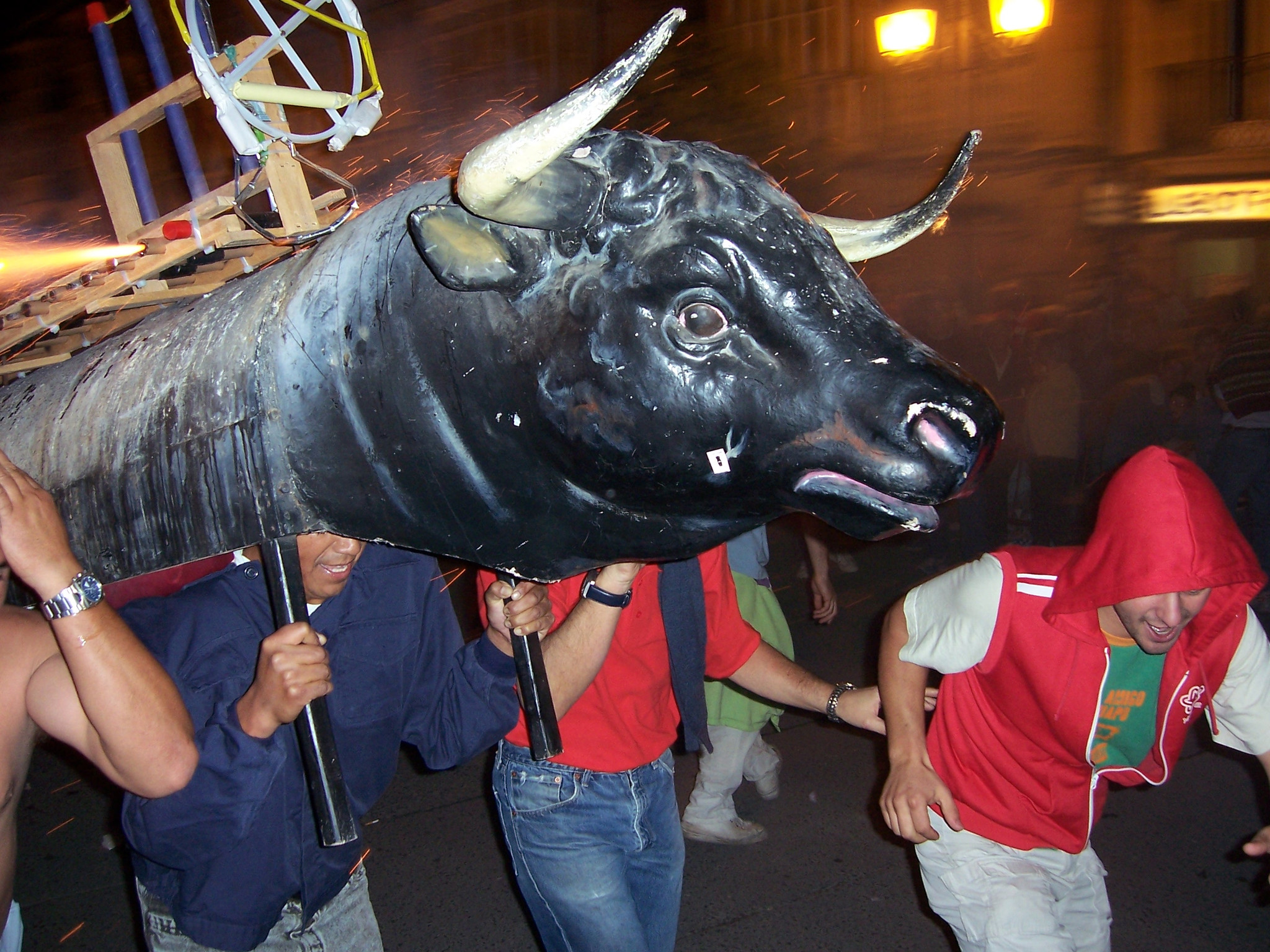
Toro de fuego festival in Haro

The gross domestic product (GDP) of the autonomous community was 8.5 billion euros in 2018, accounting for 0.7% of Spanish economic output. GDP per capita adjusted for purchasing power was 29,200 euros or 97% of the EU27 average in the same year. The GDP per employee was 102% of the EU average.

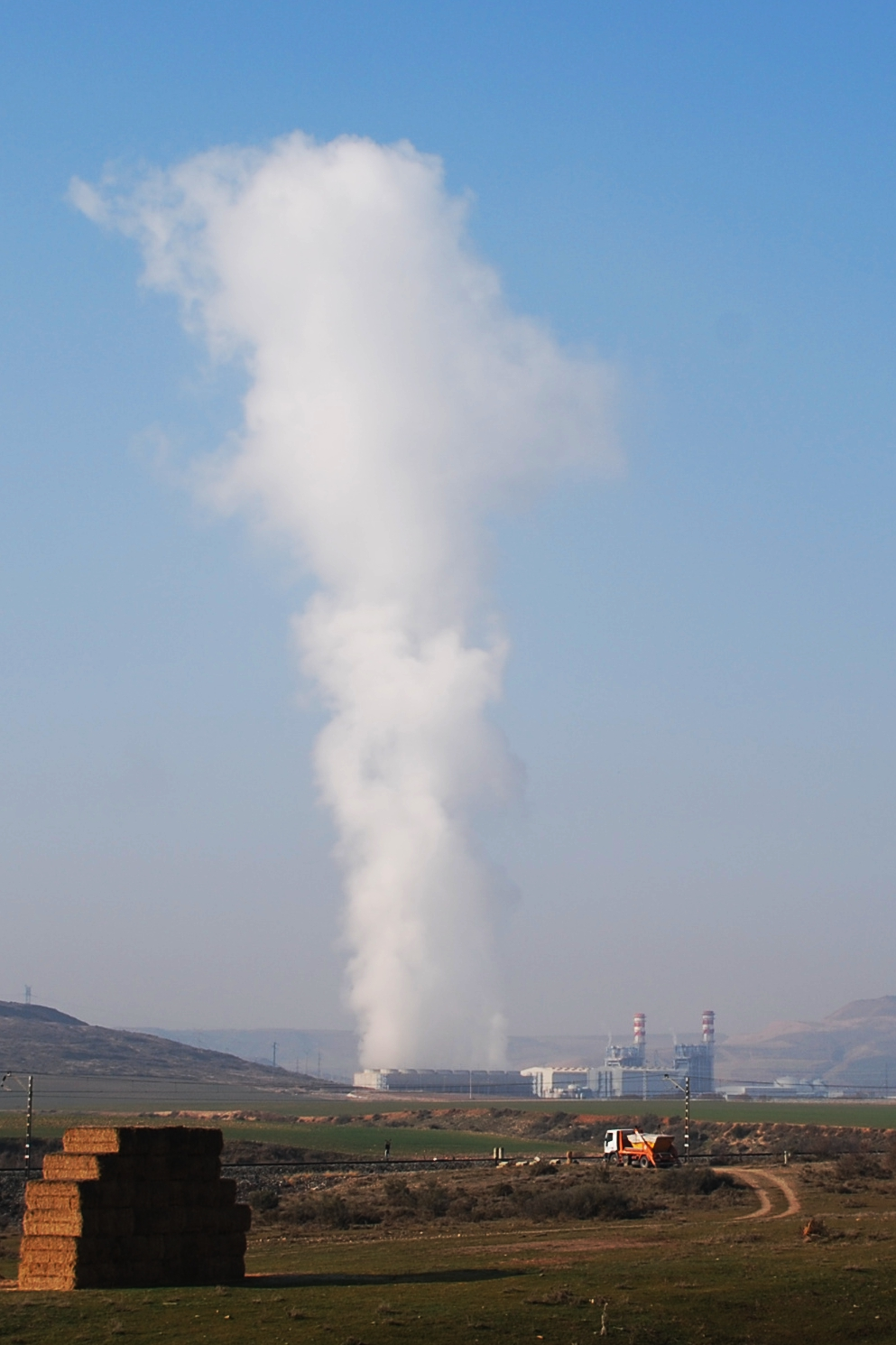
Power station at Arrúbal, La Rioja

La Rioja is known for its production of Rioja DOCa wines (although the Rioja viticultural region extends slightly into the neighboring administrative regions of Álava and Navarra).

=== Agriculture ===
There is dryland farming of wheat, barley and grape; irrigated cultivation of asparagus, capsicum and other crops; and animal husbandry of sheep.

=== Industry ===
Types of industry include wine production and conserves (in Logroño, Cenicero, Haro and Calahorra); textiles and footwear (in Logroño, Arnedo, Cervera del Río Alhama and Ezcaray); furniture manufacturing (in Ezcaray, Logroño and Nájera); rubber, plastics, chemical products and transport machinery; and chorizo, made in Casalarreina.

Exports are directed mostly towards the European Union, United States and Canada.

La Rioja hosts the annual Battle of Wine festival in the village of Haro. Another famous local festival is the Toro de fuego, where a metal frame in the shape of a bull is carried among festival goers, which also takes place in Haro.

== Education ==
According to the 2007 PISA report, education in La Rioja is of the highest quality in Spain, close to that of other European countries with better overall educational levels in terms of student knowledge. In the Ministry of Education's 2009 report La Rioja was in first position among the autonomous communities as it relates to general aspects of primary and secondary education.

It is placed above the Spanish average in the list of communities with the lowest levels of school failure, with 85% of students being able to obtain the ESO title, despite its schools having the highest proportion of enrolled immigrants.

6,208 euros are spent per pupil, making it the tenth ranked community in this regard. The majority of educational institutions in the community are public, followed by subsidized and private schools, the latter of which are very scarce at the primary and secondary levels. The bachillerato is free in public schools and at a cost in charter schools.

In La Rioja the portion of the population with higher education is 30.6%, with two institutions offering studies at this level: the University of La Rioja and an online university, the International University of La Rioja.

== Transport ==
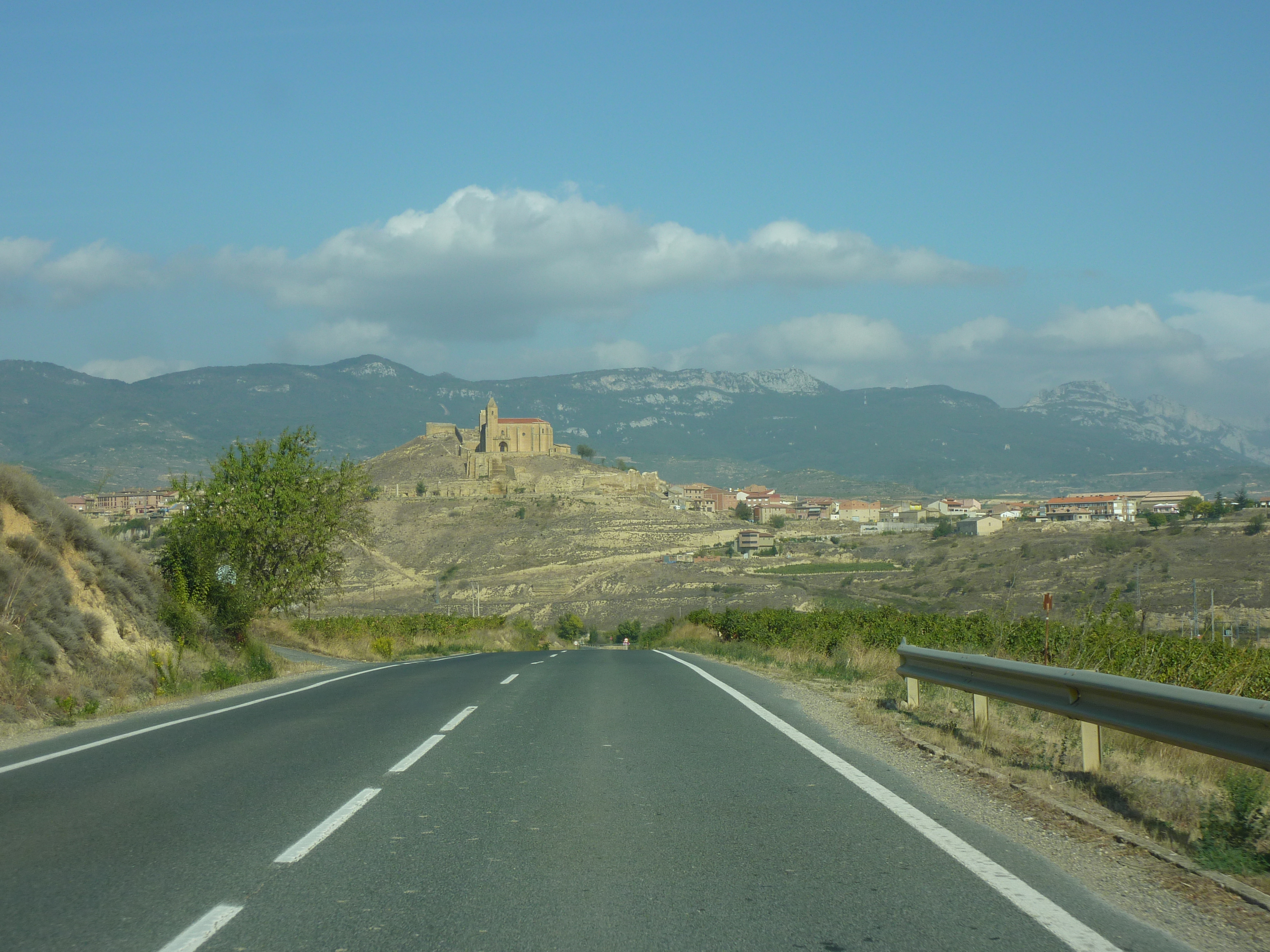
Regional road LR-210 towards San Vicente de la Sonsierra

La Rioja is served by Logroño-Agoncillo Airport which provides direct routes to Madrid and Palma de Mallorca that are operated by Iberia. However, other nearby airports, such as Bilbao Airport, Vitoria Airport, and Pamplona Airport, are also used by air travellers from the province.

Rail journeys to Madrid, Zaragoza, Barcelona, Valladolid, Oviedo, Bilbao, La Coruña, Vigo are possible, since the Castejón-Miranda line crosses the region from east to west. The main railway station is that at Logroño.

Roads between La Rioja and neighboring regions are primarily through the AP-68. Additional highways have been built, such as the Autovía A-12 which connects Pamplona to Logroño since 2006, and in the future will reach Burgos. Other major road routes include:

- N-111
- N-232
- N-120
- Autopista AP-69 (proposed)
- Piqueras Tunnel
- Puerto de Oncala
- Puerto de Piqueras

== Monuments ==
- Monastery of Santa María la Real of Najera
- Concatedral de Santa María de la Redonda
- Catedral de Santo Domingo de la Calzada
- Iglesia de Santo Tomás
- Abbey of Santa María de San Salvador of Cañas
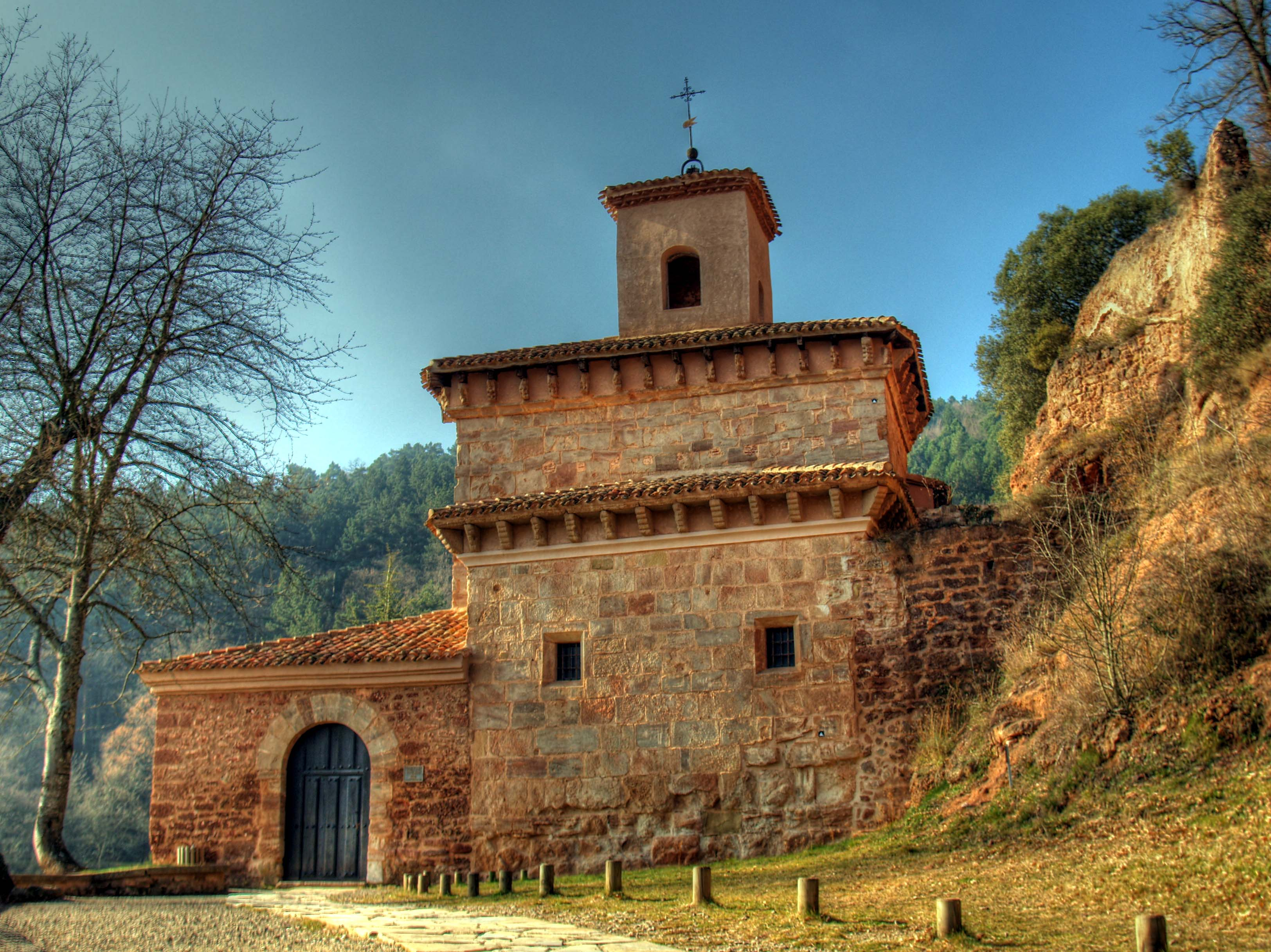
Monasteries of San Millán de la Cogolla

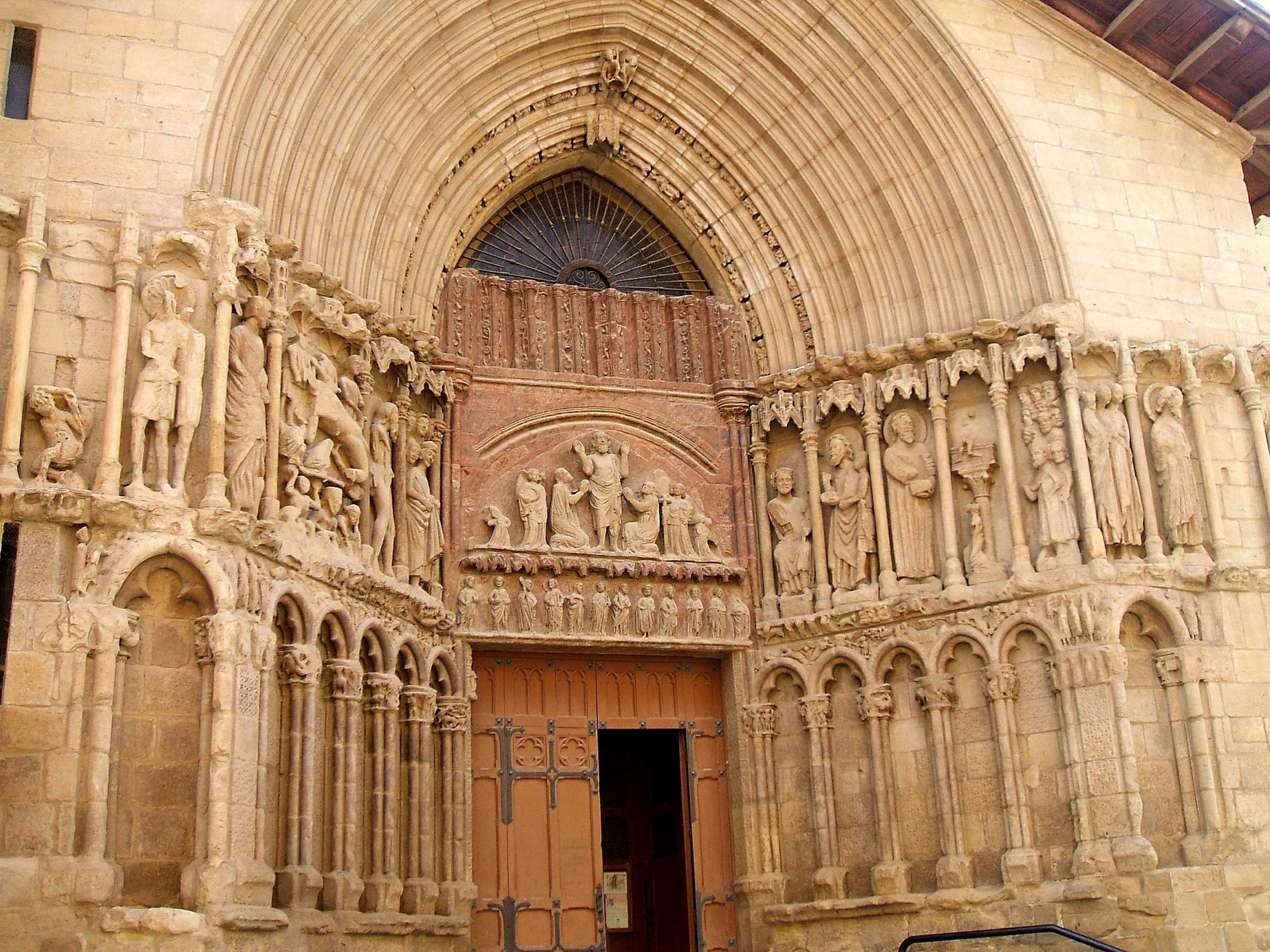
Portal of Church of San Bartolomé (Logroño)

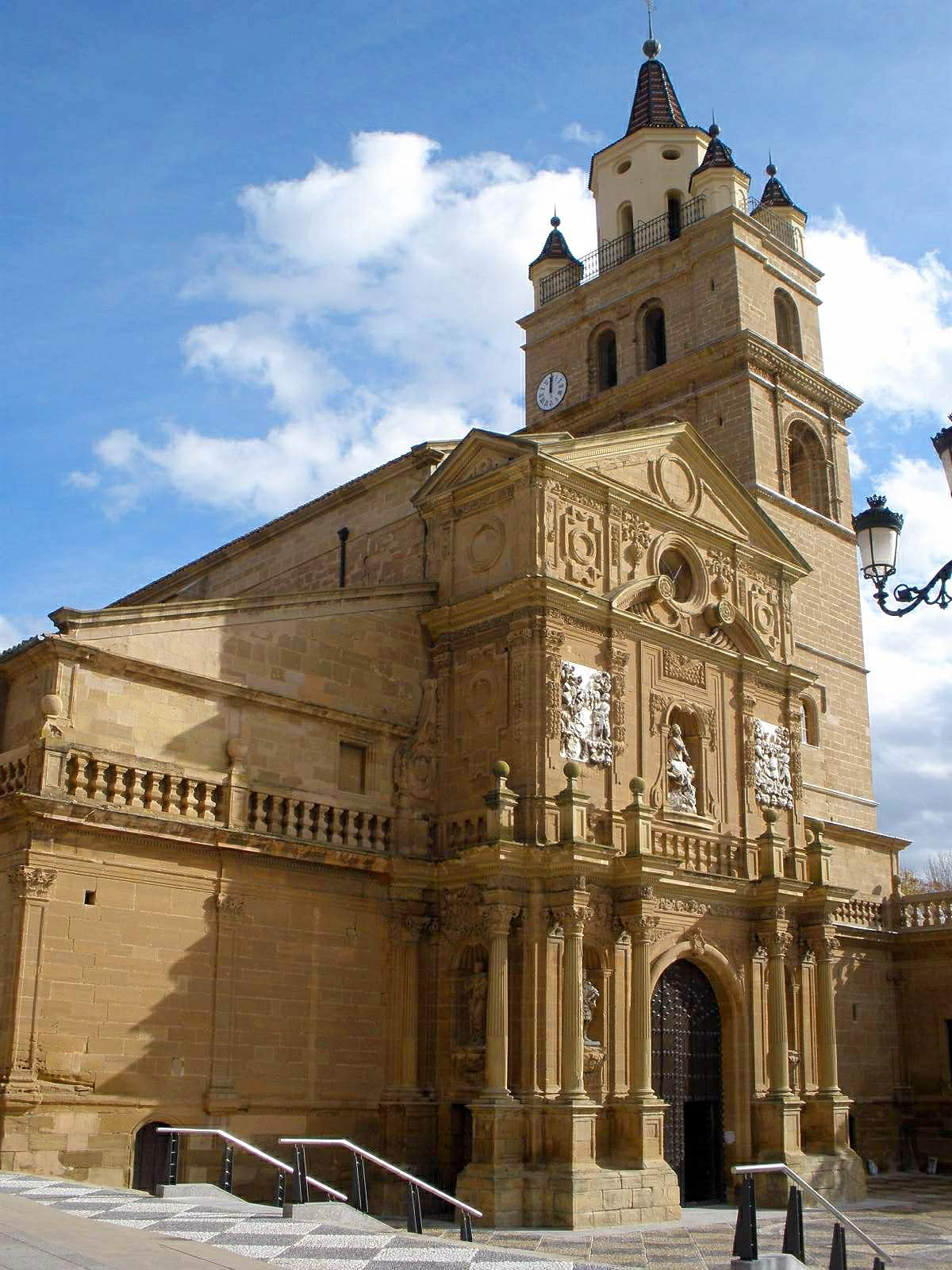
Calahorra Cathedral

== Notable people ==
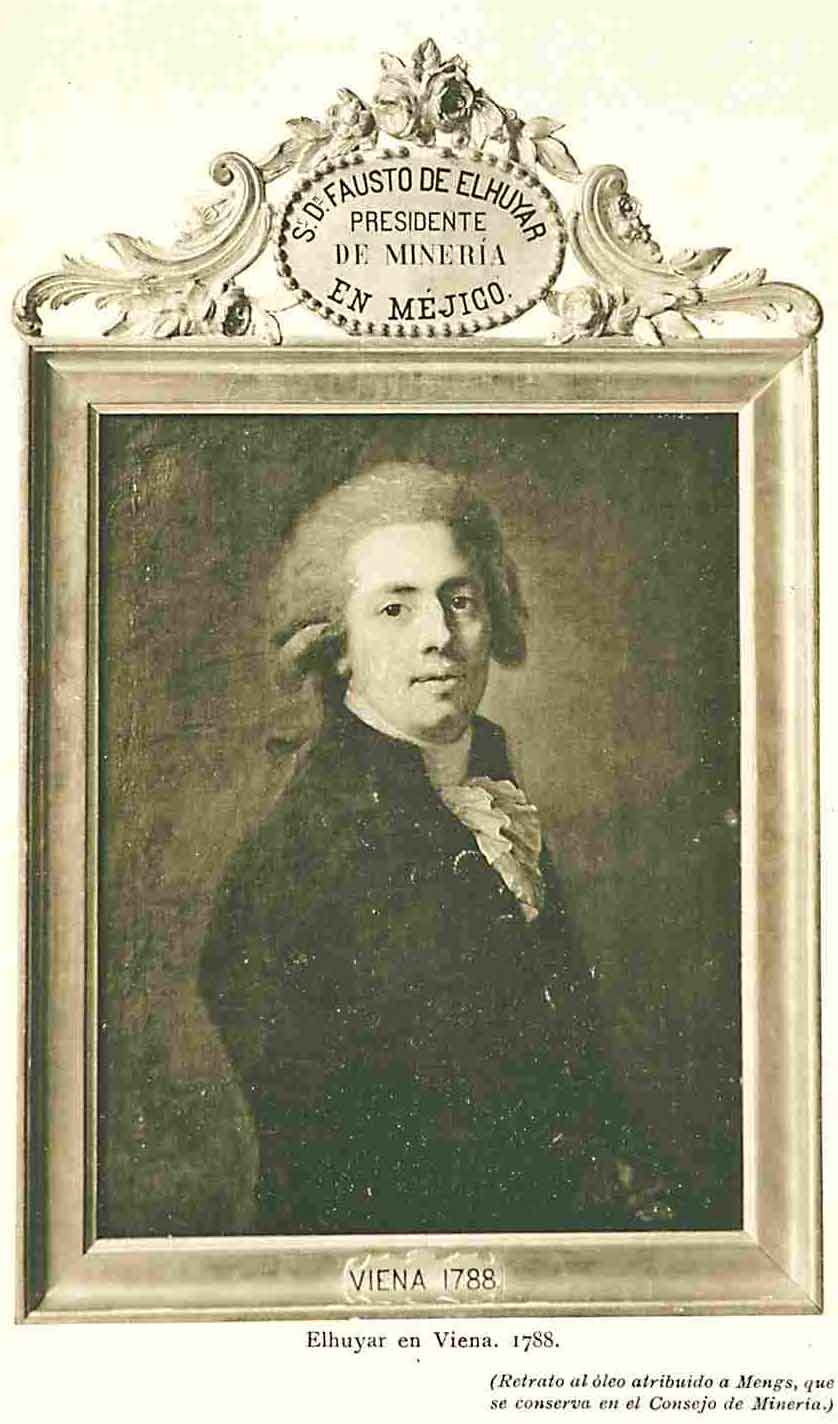
Fausto Elhuyar (1755–1833), chemist and joint discoverer of tungsten with his brother Juan José Elhuyar

- Ángel Iturriaga Barco
- Celso Morga Iruzubieta
- Dani Aranzubia
- Domingo de Silos
- Fausto Elhuyar
- Fortunato Pablo Urcey
- Francisco Javier de Lizana y Beaumont
- Gonzalo de Berceo
- Gustavo Bueno
- José Ortiz-Echagüe
- Juan José Elhuyar
- Manuel Bretón de los Herreros
- Martín Fernández de Navarrete
- Práxedes Mateo Sagasta

== See also ==
- Caparrones, one of the most important dishes in Riojan cooking.
- Dulzaina, a popular musical instrument from La Rioja.
- History of Rioja wine
- Jota (music), a popular dance practiced in some comarcas of La Rioja.
- List of presidents of the Parliament of La Rioja
