= Tirgo =

- Municipality
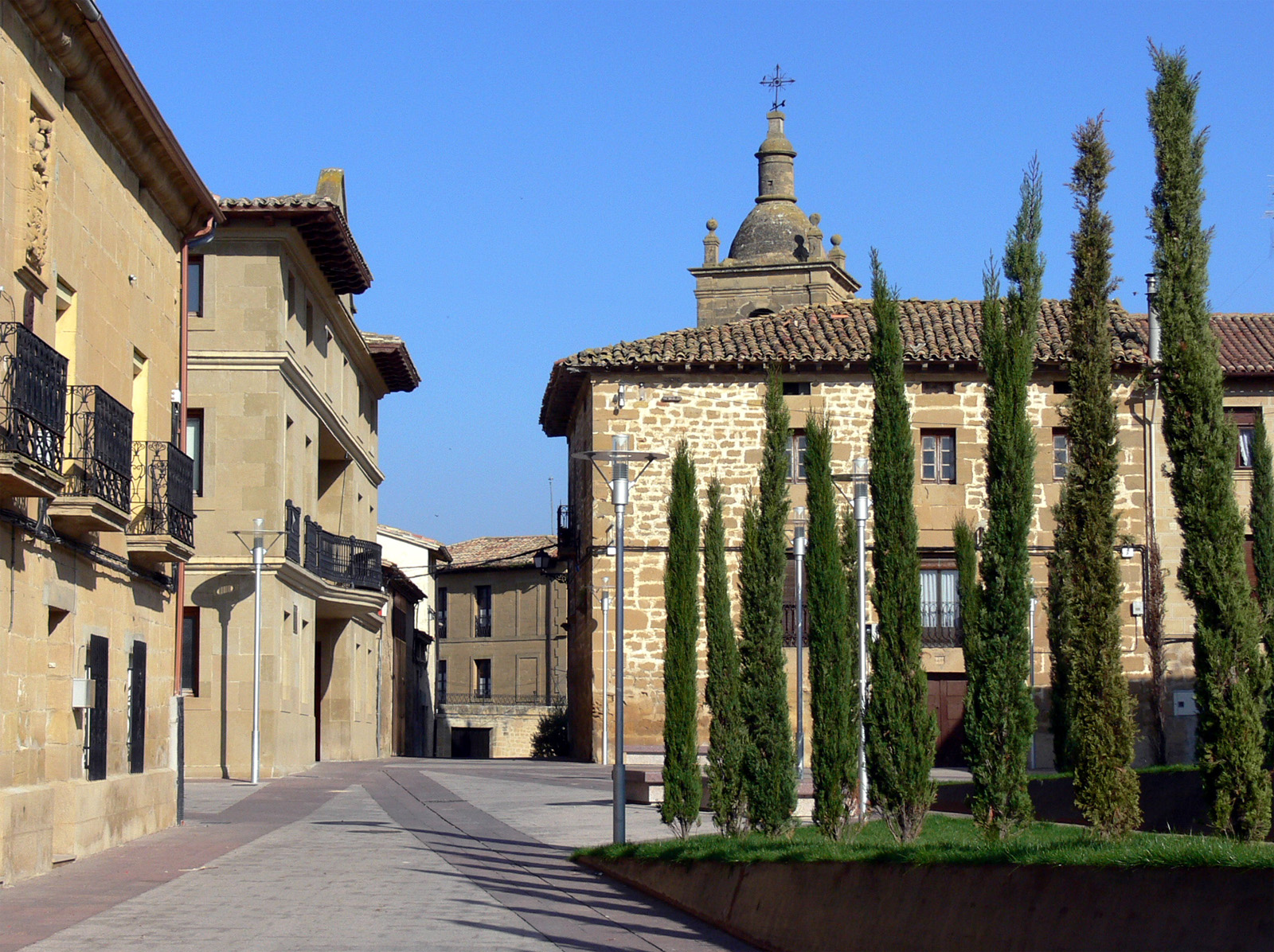
- City center of Tirgo

- Location within La Rioja, Spain Location within Spain
- Coordinates: 42°32′44″N 2°56′55″W
- Country: Spain
- Autonomous community: La Rioja
- Comarca: Haro

Government
  - Mayor: Juan María Ruiz Cueva (PSOE)

Area
  - Total: 9.14 km^{2} (3.53 sq mi)
- Elevation: 521 m (1,709 ft)

Population (2025-01-01)
  - Total: 167
- Demonym(s): tirgueño, ña
- Postal code: 26211

Tirgo is a village in the province and autonomous community of La Rioja, Spain. The municipality covers an area of 9.04 square kilometres (3.49 sq mi) and as of 2011 had a population of 231 people.
