= Villarejo =

- Municipality
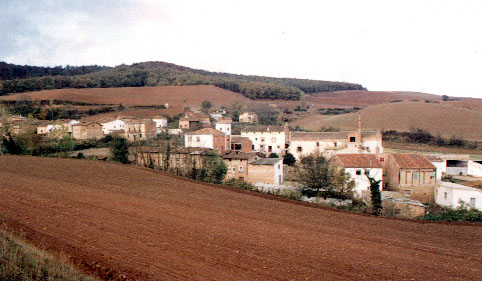
- Skyline of Villarejo

- Location within La Rioja, Spain Location within Spain
- Coordinates: 42°22′22″N 2°53′15″W
- Country: Spain
- Autonomous community: La Rioja
- Comarca: Nájera

Government
  - Mayor: Ernesto Sierra Palacios (PSOE)

Area
  - Total: 6.38 km^{2} (2.46 sq mi)
- Elevation: 83 m (272 ft)

Population (2025-01-01)
  - Total: 30
- Postal code: 26325
- Website: www.ayuntamientodevillarejo.org

Villarejo is a village in the province and autonomous community of La Rioja, Spain. The municipality covers an area of 6.38 square kilometres (2.46 sq mi) and as of the latest available census had a population of 9 people.
