= Zorraquín =

- Municipality
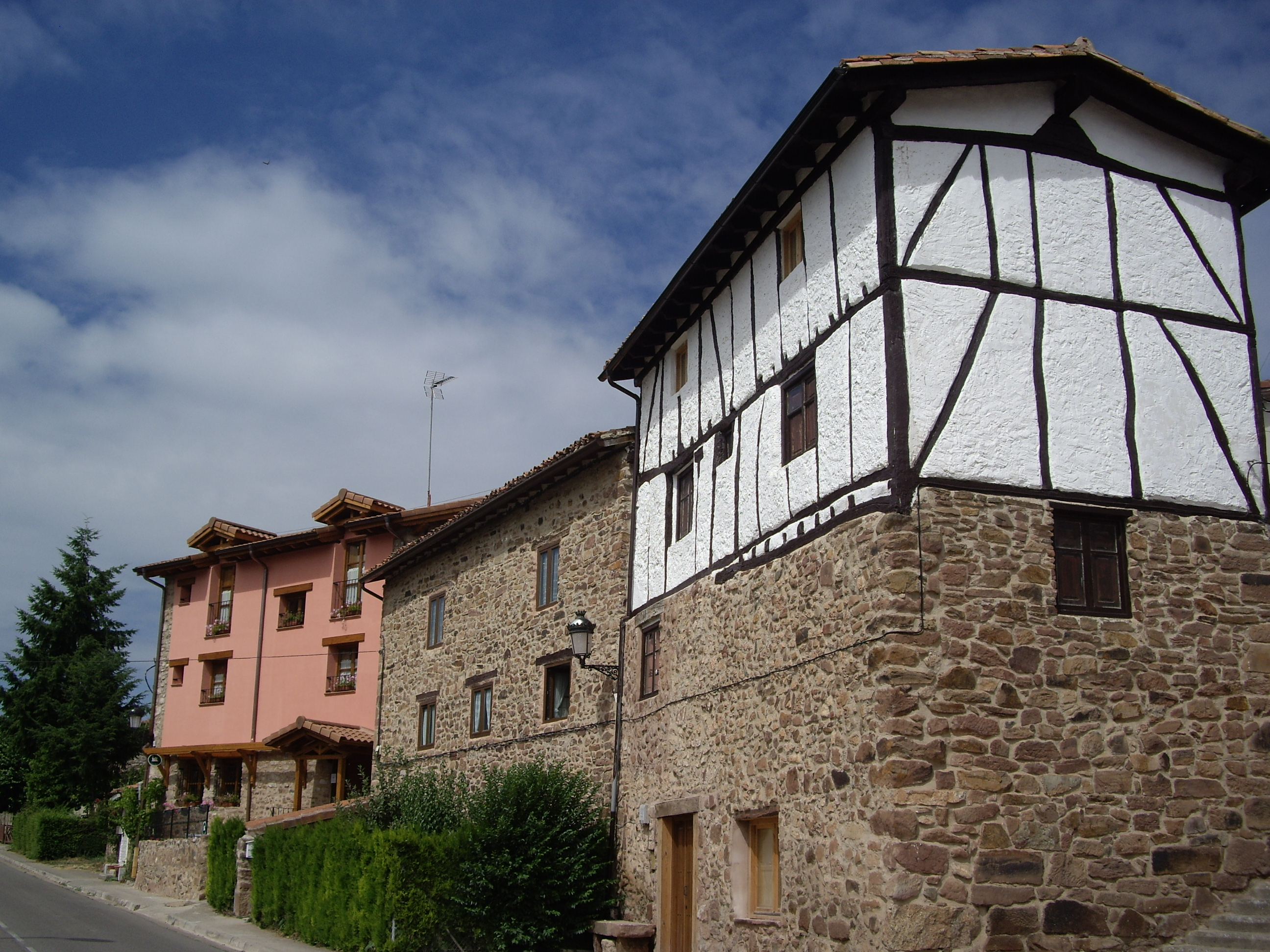
- Skyline of Zorraquín

- Location within La Rioja, Spain Location within Spain
- Coordinates: 42°19′33″N 3°02′21″W
- Country: Spain
- Autonomous community: La Rioja
- Comarca: Ezcaray

Government
  - Mayor: José Ángel Capellán Marín (PP)

Area
  - Total: 5.9 km^{2} (2.3 sq mi)
- Elevation: 863 m (2,831 ft)

Population (2025-01-01)
  - Total: 88
- Postal code: 26288
- Website: www.zorraquin.org

Zorraquín is a village in the province and autonomous community of La Rioja, Spain. The municipality covers an area of 6.44 square kilometres (2.49 sq mi) and as of 2011 had a population of 87 people.
