= Cidamón =

- Municipality
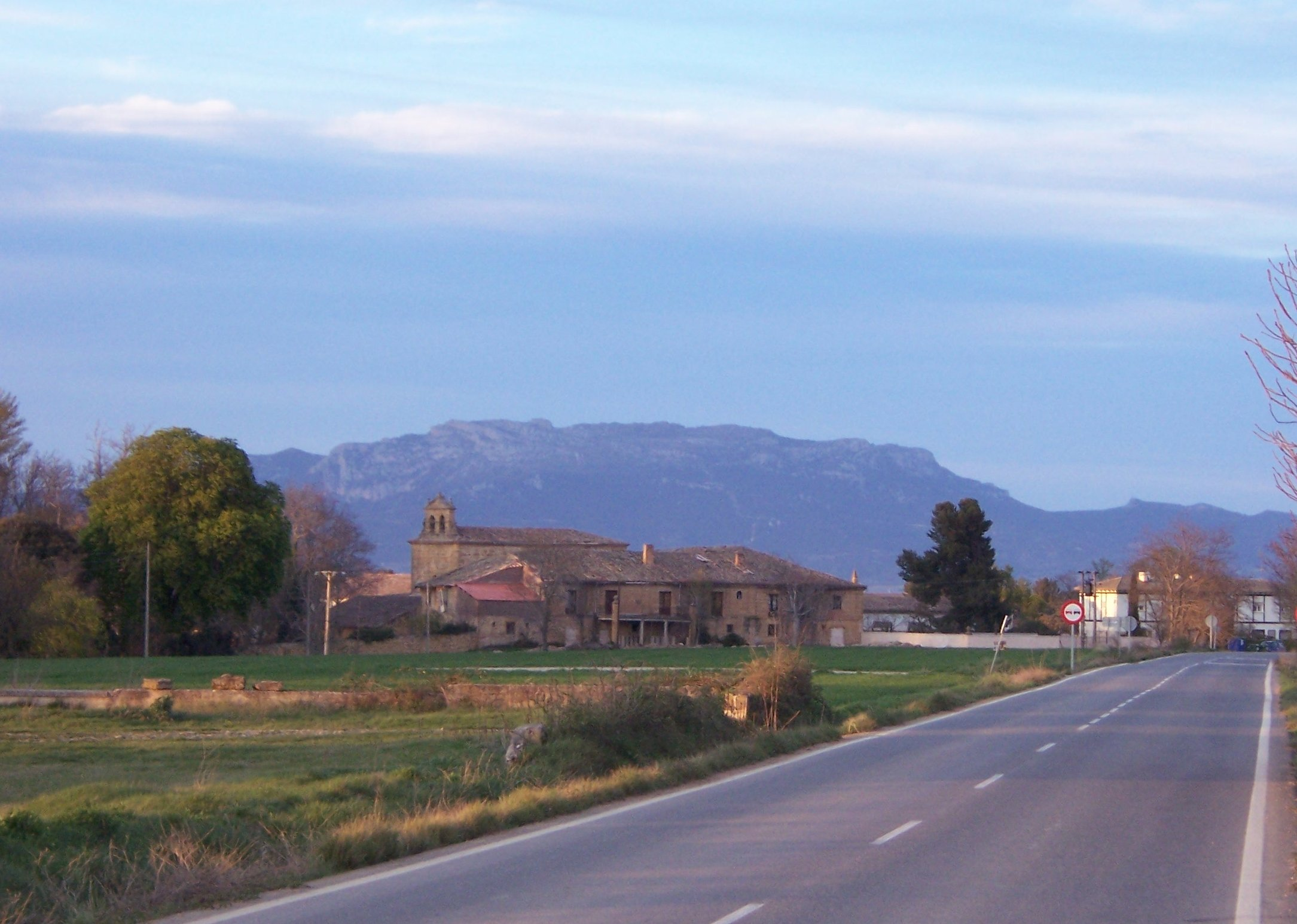
- Skyline of Cidamón

- Location within La Rioja, Spain Location within Spain
- Coordinates: 42°29′39″N 2°52′45″W
- Country: Spain
- Autonomous community: La Rioja
- Comarca: Haro

Government
  - Mayor: Joaquín Yusta de la Calle (PP)

Area
  - Total: 15.80 km^{2} (6.10 sq mi)
- Elevation: 584 m (1,916 ft)

Population (2025-01-01)
  - Total: 18
- Postal code: 26291

Cidamón is a village in the province and autonomous community of La Rioja, Spain. The municipality covers an area of 15.8 square kilometres (6.1 sq mi) and as of 2011 had a population of 36 people.

== Notable people ==
- Luís María Peña Blanco (1936-2017): Businessman
