= Santurdejo =

- Municipality
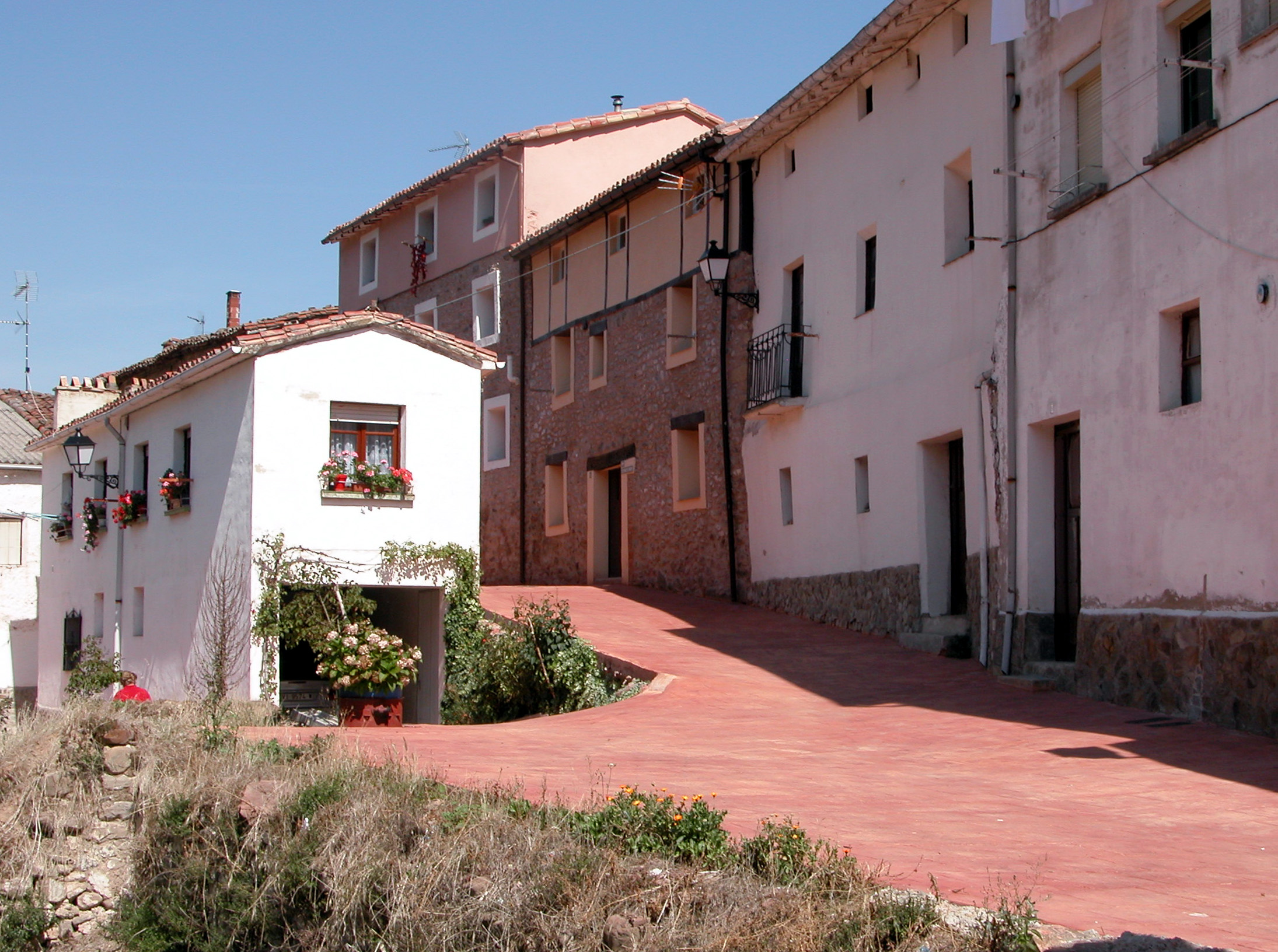
- Streets of Santurdejo

- Location within La Rioja, Spain Location within Spain
- Coordinates: 42°22′41″N 2°57′17″W
- Country: Spain
- Autonomous community: La Rioja
- Comarca: Santo Domingo de la Calzada

Government
  - Mayor: Agustín San Martín Álvarez (PP)

Area
  - Total: 18.35 km^{2} (7.08 sq mi)
- Elevation: 777 m (2,549 ft)

Population (2025-01-01)
  - Total: 95
- Demonym(s): soteño, ña
- Postal code: 26261
- Website: www.santurdejo.org

Santurdejo is a village in the province and autonomous community of La Rioja, Spain. The municipality covers an area of 18.35 square kilometres (7.08 sq mi) and as of 2011 had a population of 156 people.
