= Camprovín =

- Municipality
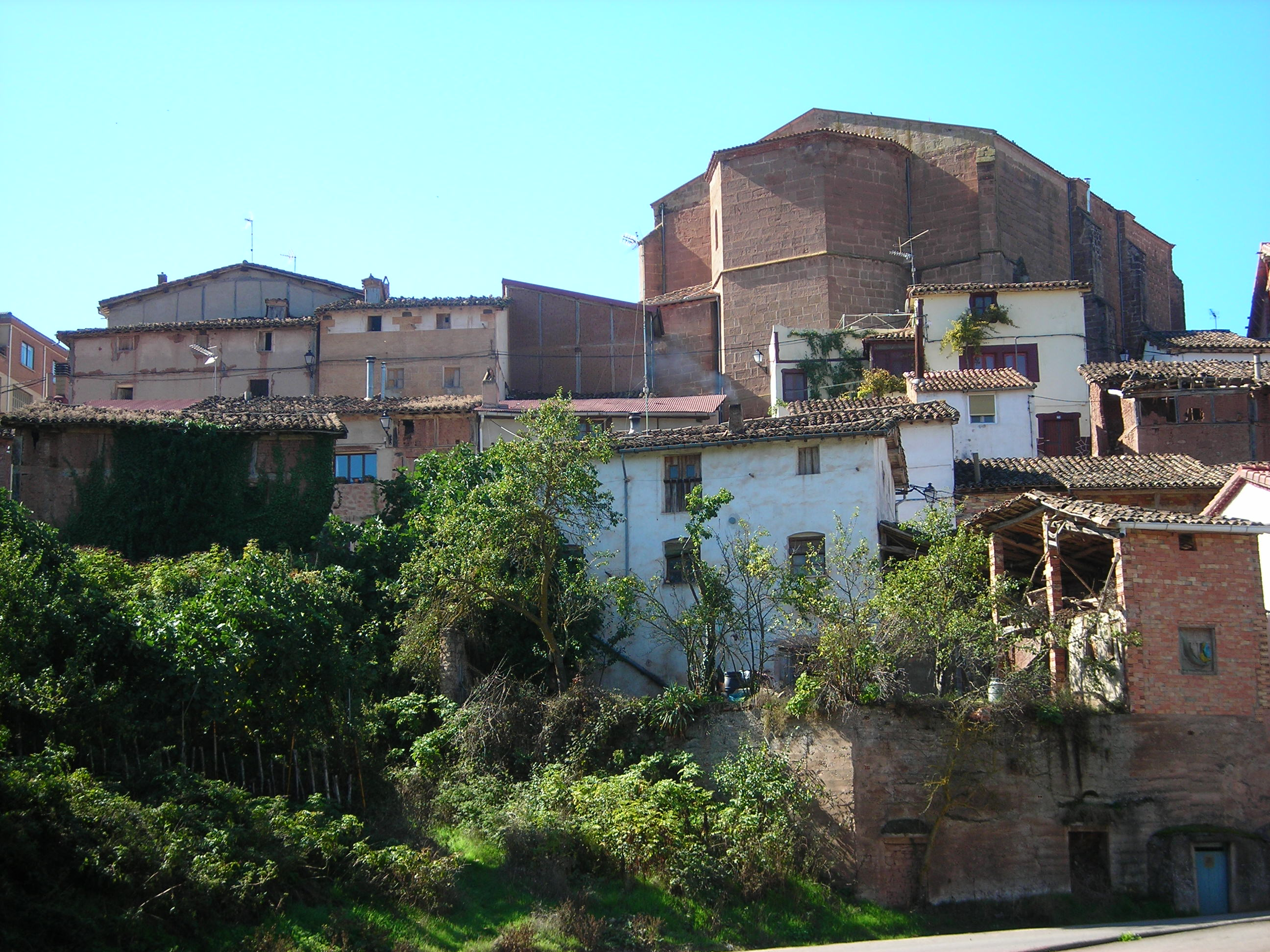
- Skyline of Camprovín

- Coat of arms

- Location within La Rioja, Spain Location within Spain
- Coordinates: 42°21′14″N 2°43′21″W
- Country: Spain
- Autonomous community: La Rioja
- Comarca: Nájera

Government
  - Mayor: Arturo Isidro Manuel Villar Villar (IU)

Area
  - Total: 20.45 km^{2} (7.90 sq mi)
- Elevation: 667 m (2,188 ft)

Population (2025-01-01)
  - Total: 158
- Demonym(s): camprovinés, camprovinejo.
- Postal code: 26311
- Website: Official website

Camprovín is a village in the province and autonomous community of La Rioja, Spain. The municipality covers an area of 20.45 square kilometres (7.90 sq mi) and as of 2011 had a population of 178 people.
