= San Millán de Yécora =

- Municipality
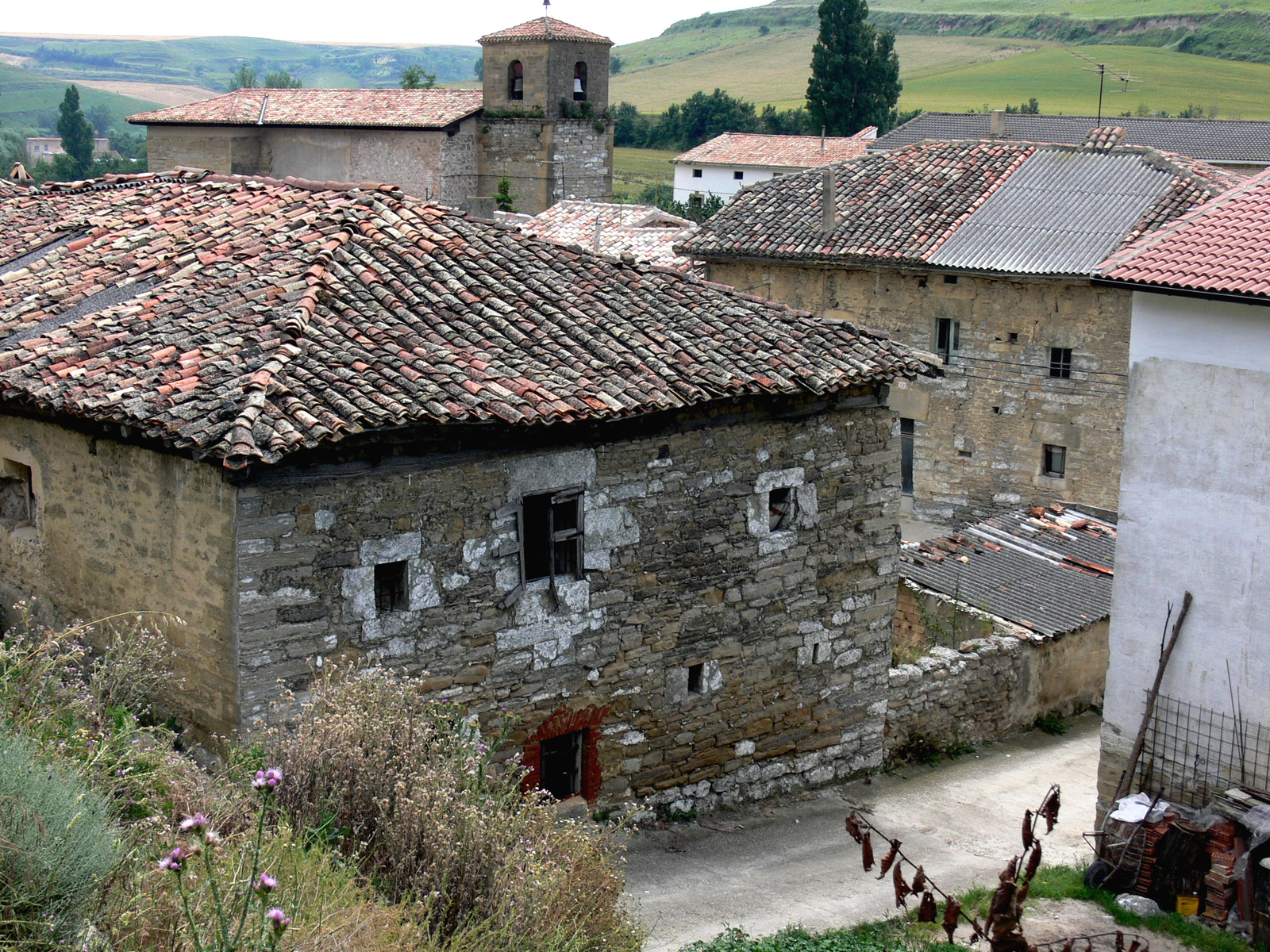
- San Millán de Yécora

- Location within La Rioja, Spain Location within Spain
- Coordinates: 42°32′47″N 3°05′48″W
- Country: Spain
- Autonomous community: La Rioja
- Comarca: Haro

Government
  - Mayor: Jaime Ruiz Pascual (PP)

Area
  - Total: 10.77 km^{2} (4.16 sq mi)
- Elevation: 658 m (2,159 ft)

Population (2025-01-01)
  - Total: 35
- Demonym(s): yecorano, na
- Postal code: 26216

San Millán de Yécora is a village in the province and autonomous community of La Rioja, Spain. The municipality covers an area of 10.77 square kilometres (4.16 sq mi) and as of 2011 had a population of 48 people.
