= Sajazarra =

- Municipality
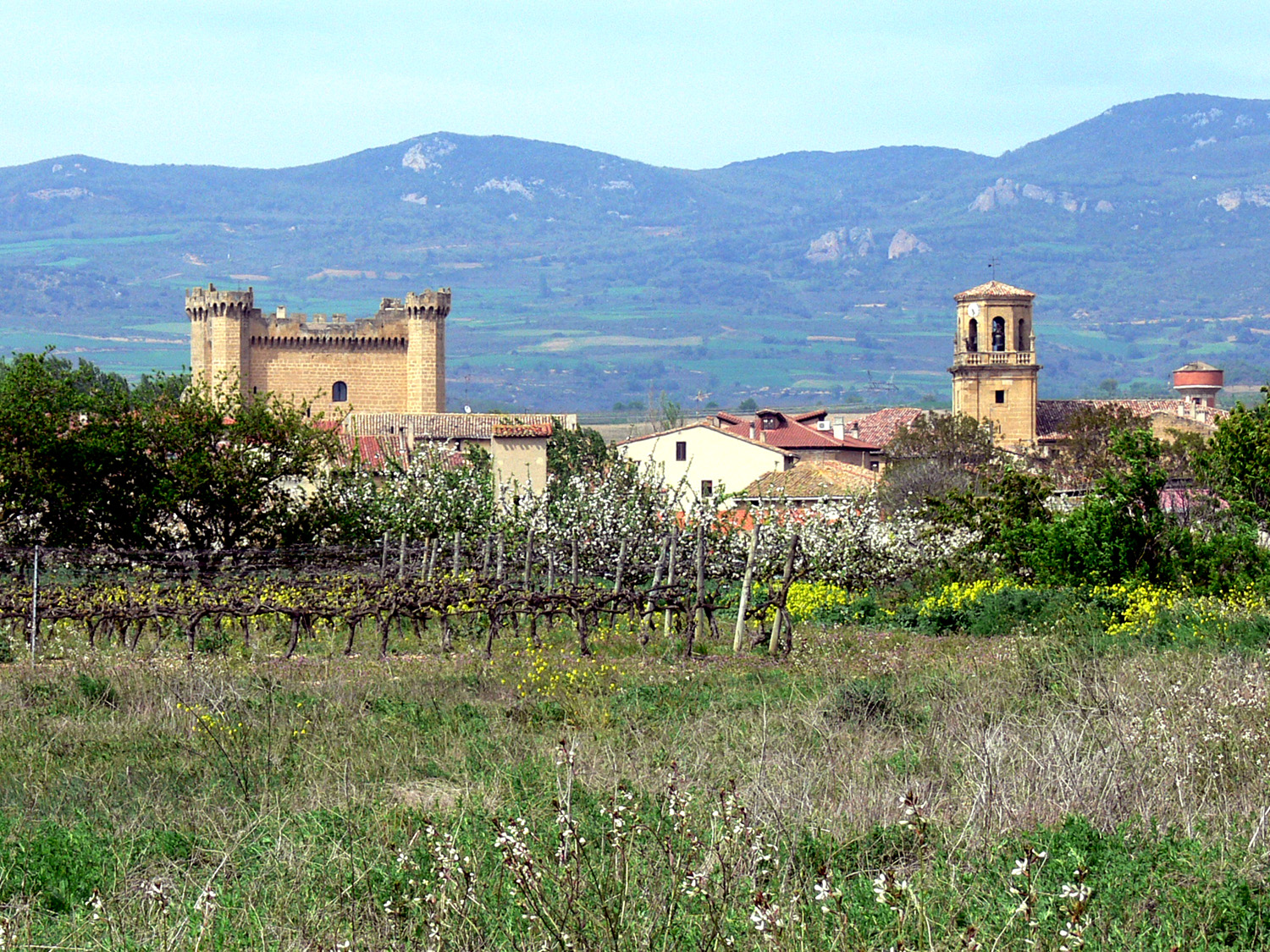
- Skyline of Sajazarra

- Location within La Rioja, Spain Location within Spain
- Coordinates: 42°35′18″N 2°57′41″W
- Country: Spain
- Autonomous community: La Rioja
- Comarca: Haro

Government
  - Mayor: Óscar Fresno Riaño (PP)

Area
  - Total: 13.84 km^{2} (5.34 sq mi)
- Elevation: 515 m (1,690 ft)

Population (2025-01-01)
  - Total: 123
- Postal code: 26212
- Website: http://www.sajazarra.org/

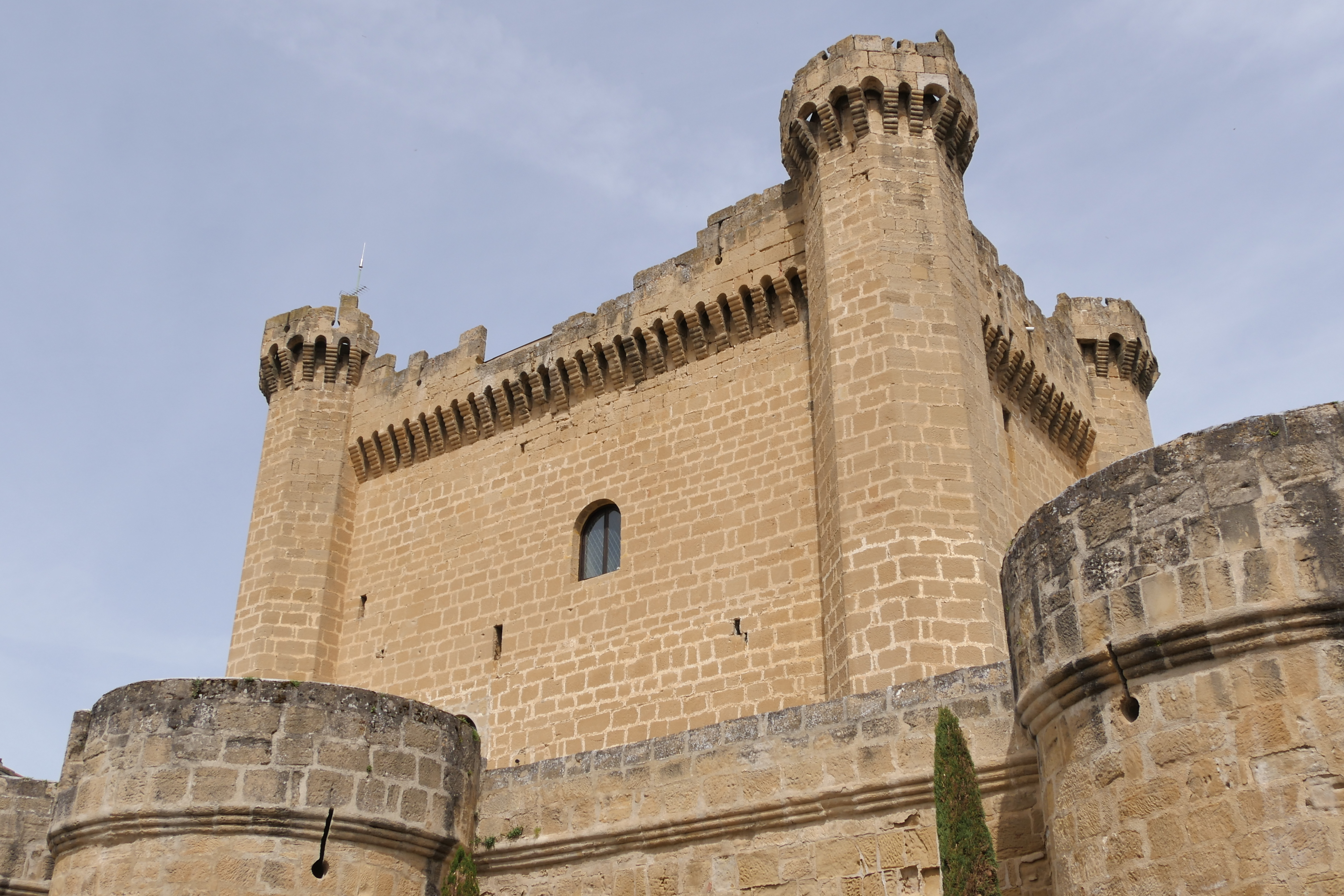
Palace-Castle of Sajazarra

Sajazarra is a village in the province and autonomous community of La Rioja, Spain. The municipality covers an area of 13.84 square kilometres (5.34 sq mi) and as of 2011 had a population of 137 people.
