= Castañares de Rioja =

- Municipality
- Skyline of Castañares de Rioja

- Coat of arms

- Location within La Rioja, Spain Location within Spain
- Coordinates: 42°30′42″N 2°55′54″W
- Country: Spain
- Autonomous community: La Rioja
- Comarca: Santo Domingo de la Calzada

Government
  - Mayor: María Teresa Bañares Ortún (PSOE)

Area
  - Total: 152.58 km^{2} (58.91 sq mi)
- Elevation: 545 m (1,788 ft)

Population (2025-01-01)
  - Total: 440
- Demonym(s): castañetero, ra
- Postal code: 26240
- Website: www.castanaresderioja.org

Castañares de Rioja is a village in the province and autonomous community of La Rioja, Spain. The municipality covers an area of 11 square kilometres (4.2 sq mi) and as of 2011 had a population of 486 people.
