= Alesón =

- Municipality
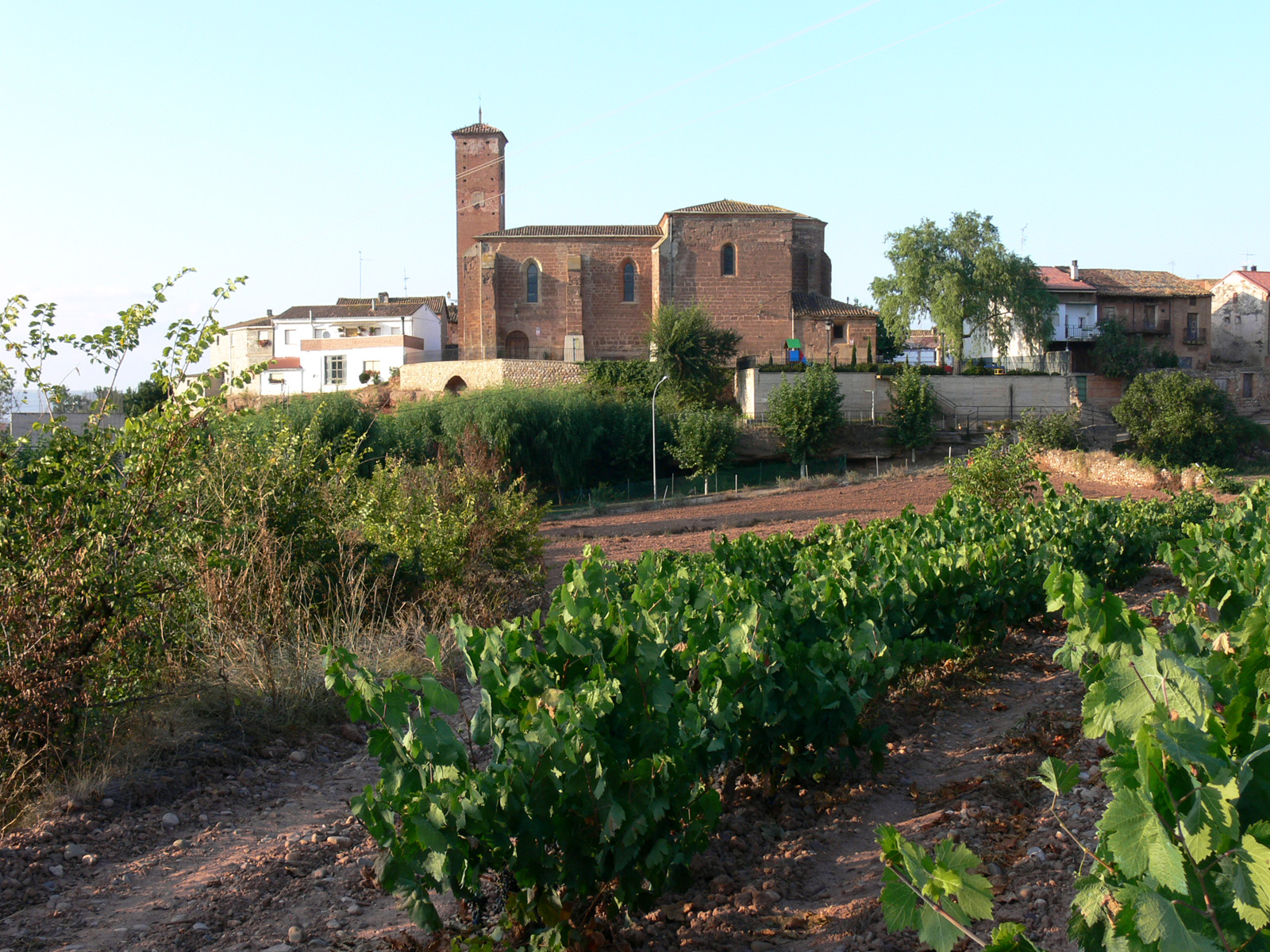
- Skyline of Alesón

- Flag Coat of arms

- Location within La Rioja, Spain Location within Spain
- Coordinates: 42°24′17″N 2°41′24″W
- Country: Spain
- Autonomous community: La Rioja
- Comarca: Nájera

Government
  - Mayor: Luis María Melón Fernández (PP)

Area
  - Total: 6.49 km^{2} (2.51 sq mi)
- Elevation: 575 m (1,886 ft)

Population (2025-01-01)
  - Total: 92
- Demonyms: alesonero, ra
- Postal code: 26315
- Website: www.aleson.es

Alesón is a town and municipality in the province and autonomous community of La Rioja, Spain. The municipality covers an area of 6.49 square kilometres (2.51 sq mi) and as of 2011 had a population of 117 people. In 2023, the population is estimated to drop to 98 people.
