= Pinillos, La Rioja =

Pinillos
- Municipality
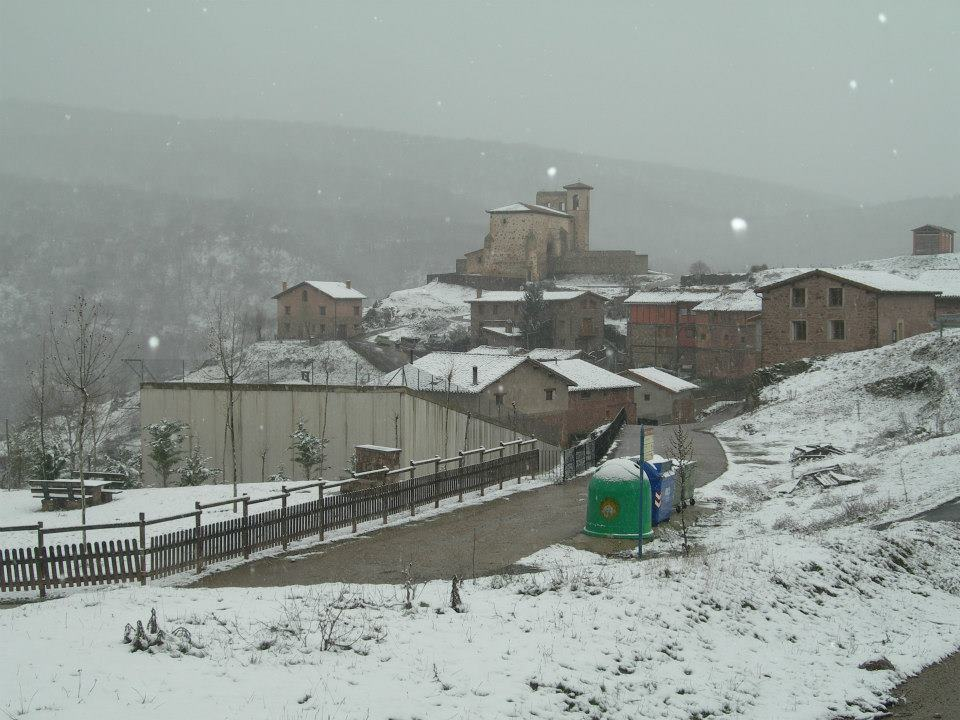
- Skyline of Pinillos

- Location within La Rioja, Spain Location within Spain
- Coordinates: 42°11′58″N 2°35′45″W
- Country: Spain
- Autonomous community: La Rioja
- Comarca: Cameros

Government
  - Mayor: José Luis Merino Aldea (PP)

Area
  - Total: 11.89 km^{2} (4.59 sq mi)
- Elevation: 1,004 m (3,294 ft)

Population (2025-01-01)
  - Total: 18
- Postal code: 26111

Pinillos is a village in the province and autonomous community of La Rioja, Spain. The municipality covers an area of 11.89 square kilometres (4.59 sq mi) and as of 2011 had a population of 18 people.
