= Valgañón =

- Municipality
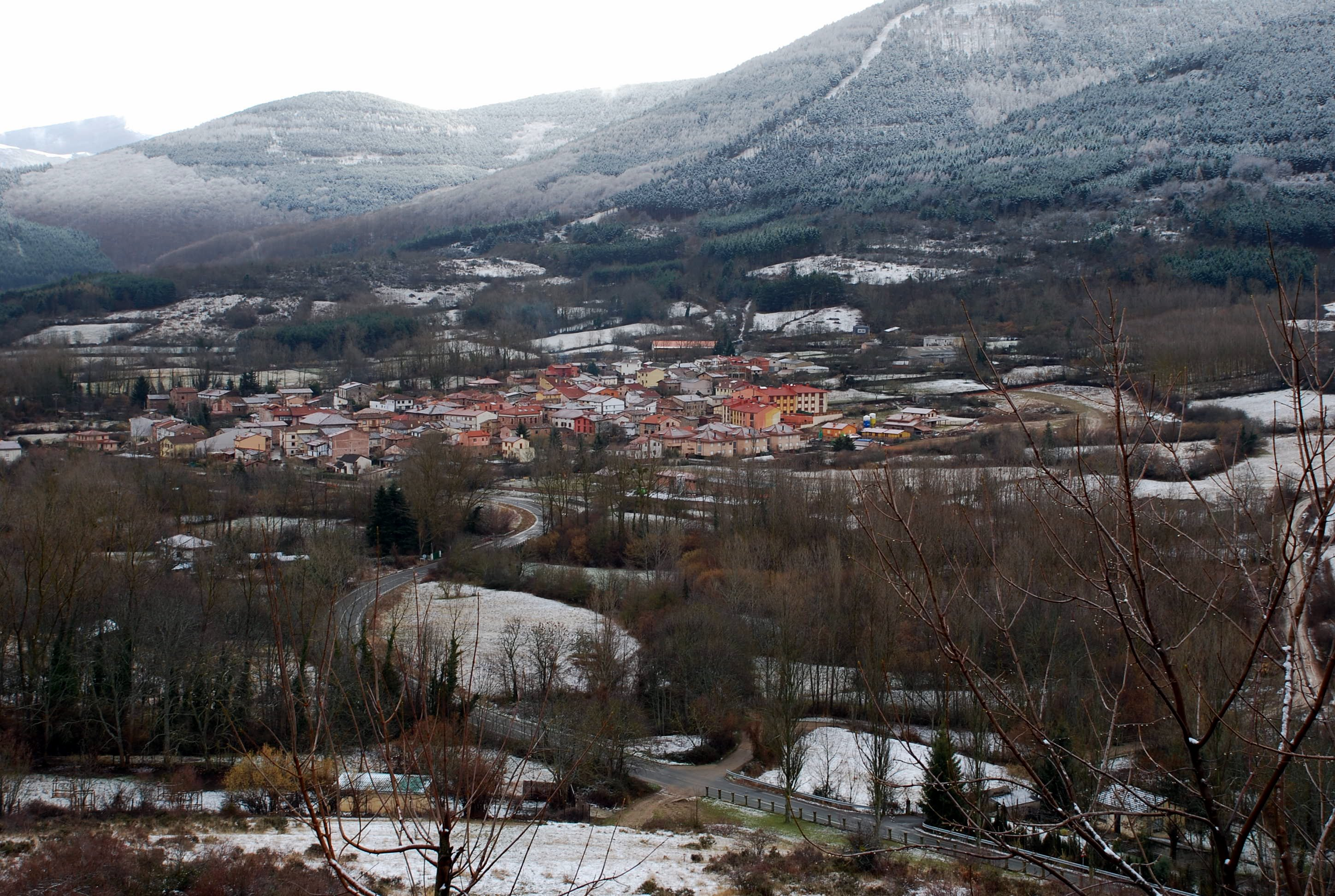
- Valgañón in winter

- Location within La Rioja, Spain Location within Spain
- Coordinates: 42°19′N 3°04′W
- Country: Spain
- Autonomous community: La Rioja
- Comarca: Rioja Alta

Government
  - Mayor: José Antonio Mateo Gonzalo (PR̟)

Area
  - Total: 31.74 km^{2} (12.25 sq mi)
- Elevation: 940 m (3,080 ft)

Population (2025-01-01)
  - Total: 133
- Postal code: 26288
- Website: www.valganion.org

Valgañón is a village in the province and autonomous community of La Rioja, Spain. The municipality covers an area of 31.74 square kilometres (12.25 sq mi) and as of 2011 had a population of 128 people.
