= Bergasillas Bajera =

- Municipality
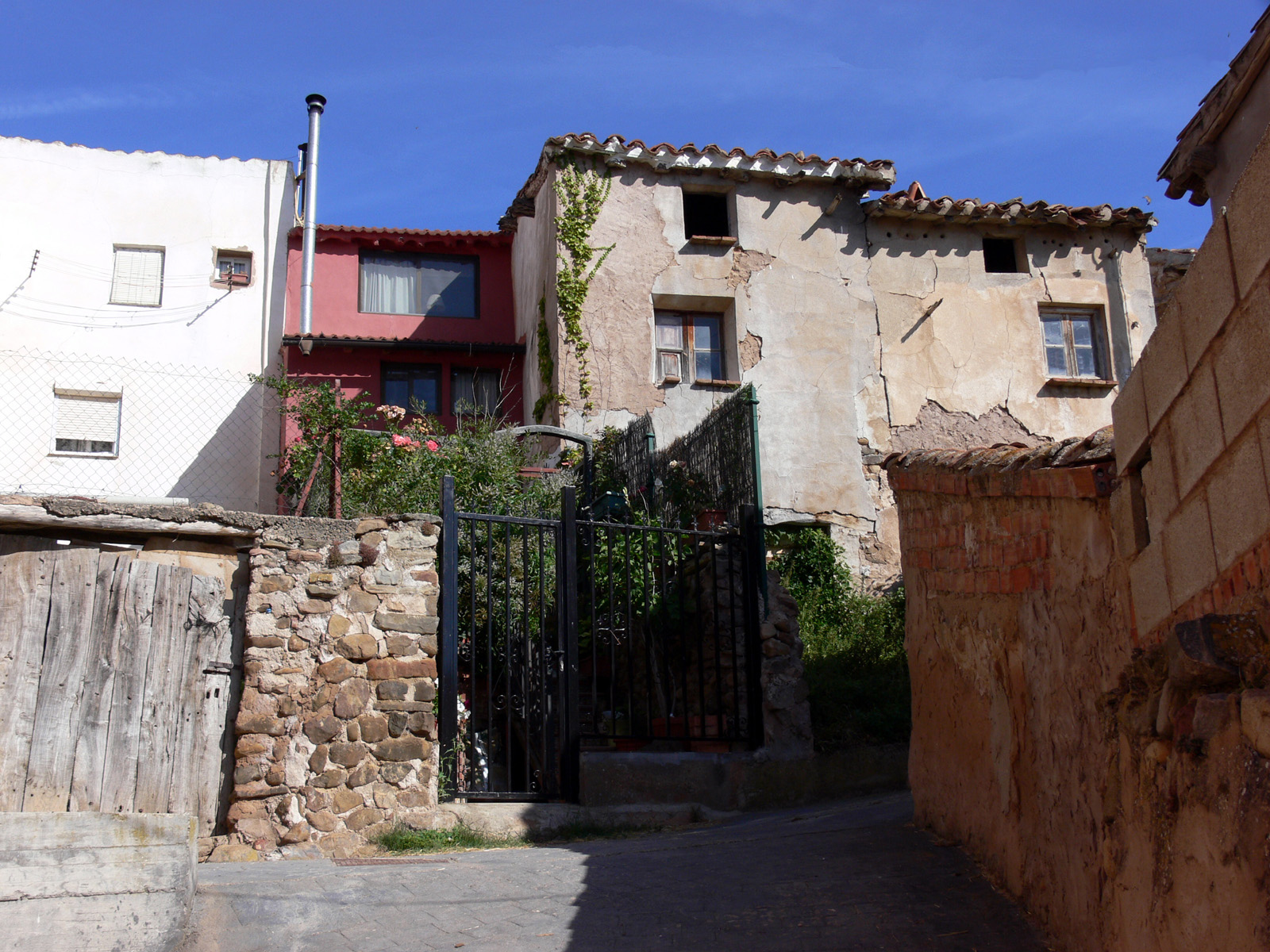
- Street of Bergasillas Bajera

- Location within La Rioja, Spain Location within Spain
- Coordinates: 42°14′41″N 2°09′31″W
- Country: Spain
- Autonomous community: La Rioja
- Comarca: Arnedo

Government
  - Mayor: Daniel Herce Herce (PP)

Area
  - Total: 9.70 km^{2} (3.75 sq mi)
- Elevation: 844 m (2,769 ft)

Population (2025-01-01)
  - Total: 31
- Demonym(s): cortezudo, da
- Postal code: 26588
- Website: Official website

Bergasillas Bajera is a village in the province and autonomous community of La Rioja, Spain. The municipality covers an area of 9.70 square kilometres (3.75 sq mi) and as of 2011 had a population of 35 people.
