= Pradillo =

- Municipality
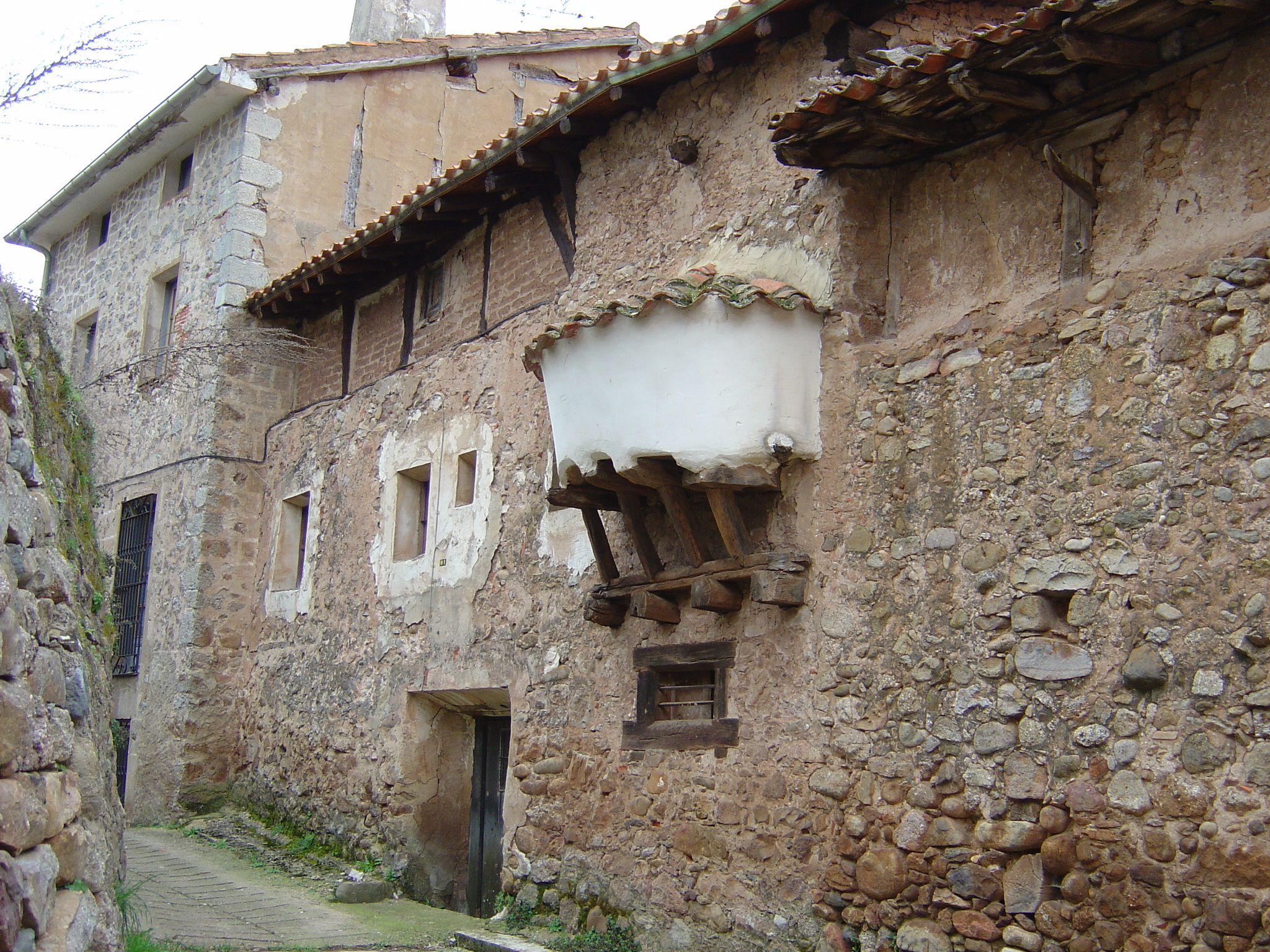
- Street of Pradillo

- Location within La Rioja, Spain Location within Spain
- Coordinates: 42°10′37″N 2°38′25″W
- Country: Spain
- Autonomous community: La Rioja
- Comarca: Camero Nuevo

Government
  - Mayor: Julio Fraguas Pérez (PP)

Area
  - Total: 10.28 km^{2} (3.97 sq mi)
- Elevation: 880 m (2,890 ft)

Population (2025-01-01)
  - Total: 64
- Postal code: 26122
- Website: Official website

Pradillo is a village in the province and autonomous community of La Rioja, Spain. The municipality covers an area of 10.28 square kilometres (3.97 sq mi) and as of 2011 had a population of 66 people.
