= Cirueña =

- Municipality
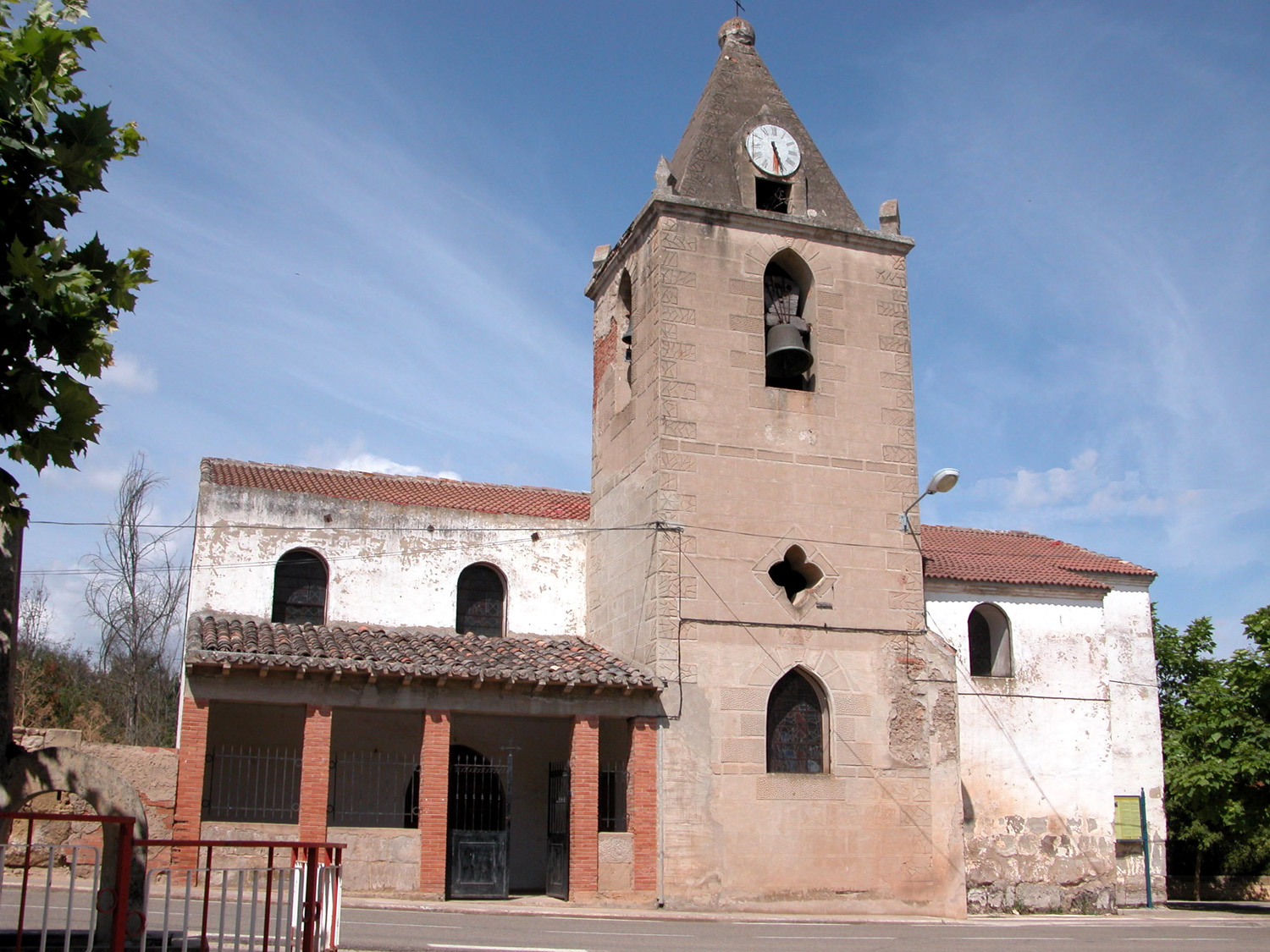
- Church of San Andrés

- Location within La Rioja, Spain Location within Spain
- Coordinates: 42°24′40″N 2°53′45″W
- Country: Spain
- Autonomous community: La Rioja
- Comarca: Santo Domingo de la Calzada

Government
  - Mayor: Pedro Jesús Cañas Martínez (PP)

Area
  - Total: 12.15 km^{2} (4.69 sq mi)
- Elevation: 755 m (2,477 ft)

Population (2025-01-01)
  - Total: 194
- Demonym(s): cirueño, ña
- Postal code: 26258
- Website: www.ciruenia.org

Cirueña is a village in the province and autonomous community of La Rioja, Spain. The municipality covers an area of 12.15 square kilometres (4.69 sq mi) and as of 2011 had a population of 131 people.
