= Santa Cruz de Yanguas =

- Municipality
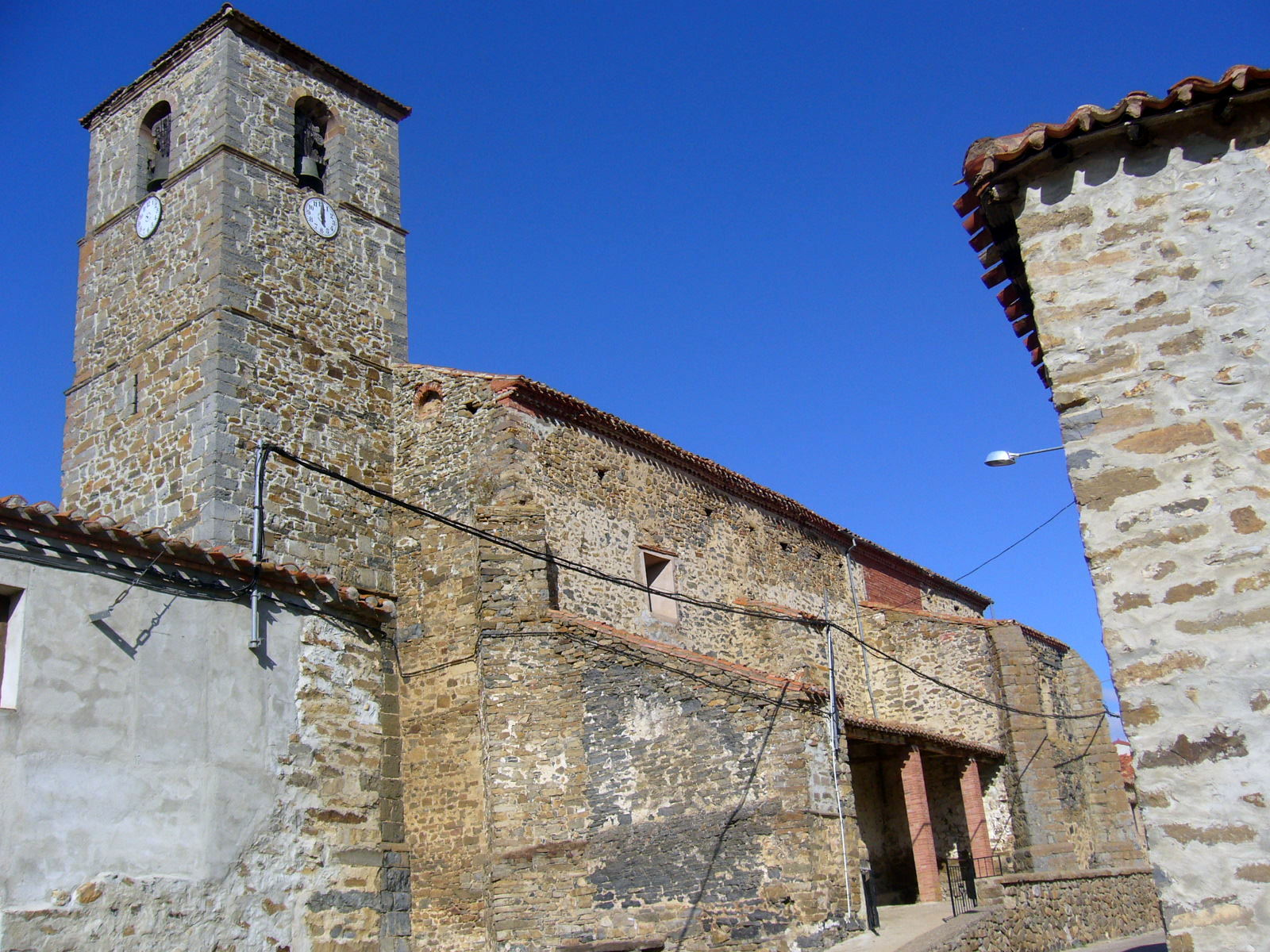
- Church of the Holy Trinity in Santa Cruz de Yanguas, Soria, Spain.

- Location in Spain. Santa Cruz de Yanguas (Spain)
- Coordinates: 42°03′40″N 2°26′55″W
- Country: Spain
- Autonomous community: Castile and León
- Province: Soria
- Municipality: Santa Cruz de Yanguas

Area
  - Total: 33 km^{2} (13 sq mi)

Population (2025-01-01)
  - Total: 56
  - Density: 1.7/km^{2} (4.4/sq mi)
- Time zone: UTC+1 (CET)
  - Summer (DST): UTC+2 (CEST)
- Website: Official website

Santa Cruz de Yanguas is a municipality located in the province of Soria, Castile and León, Spain. According to the 2004 census (INE), the municipality has a population of 64 inhabitants.
