= Comarca de Anguiano =

Anguiano
- Comarca
- Interactive map of Anguiano
- Coordinates: 42.25°N 2.833331°W
- Country: Spain
- Autonomous community: La Rioja
- Province: La Rioja

Anguiano is a comarca in La Rioja province in Spain.
