= Leza River =

River in the Iberian Peninsula

Leza
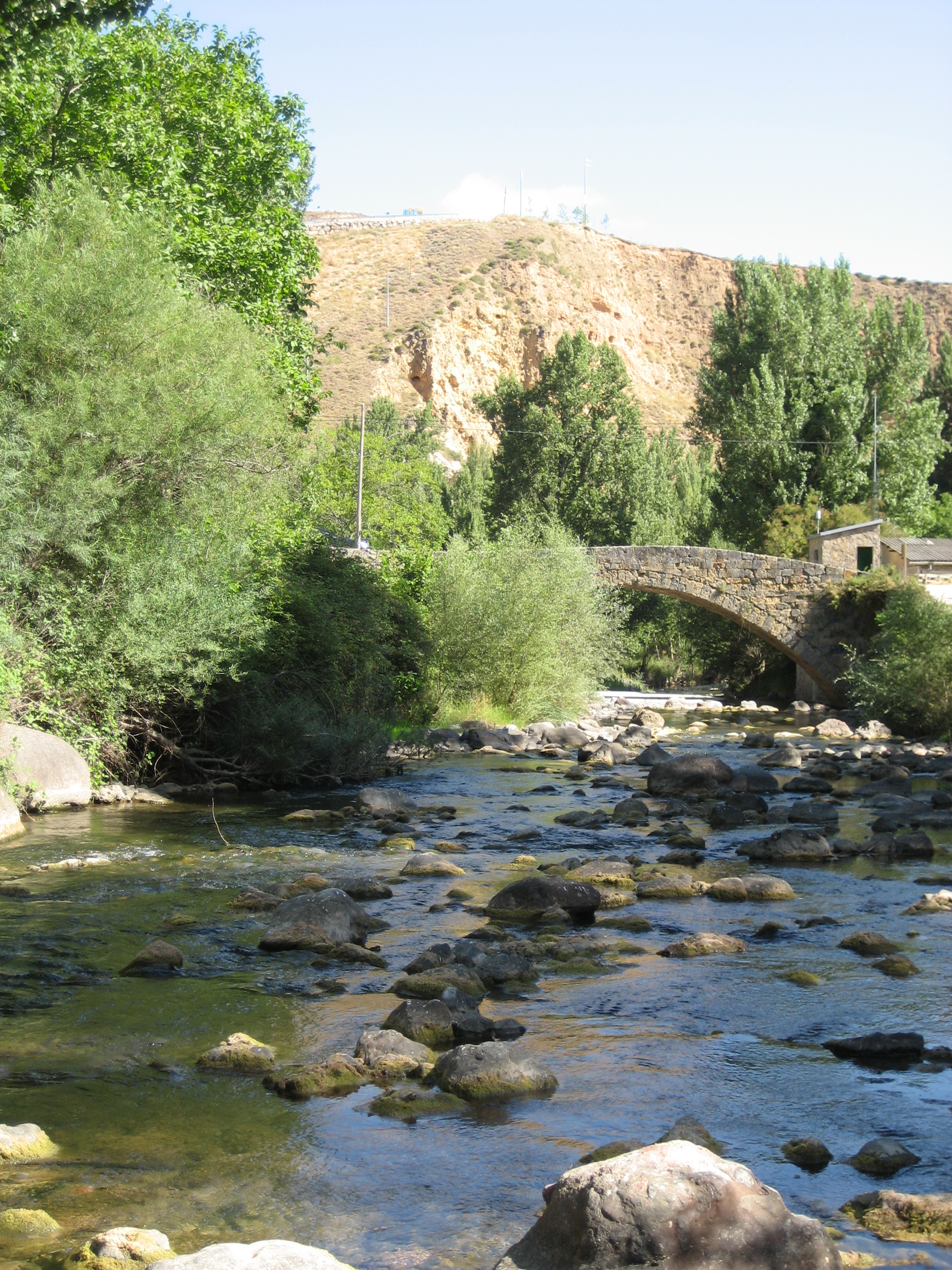
- The Leza near Soto en Cameros

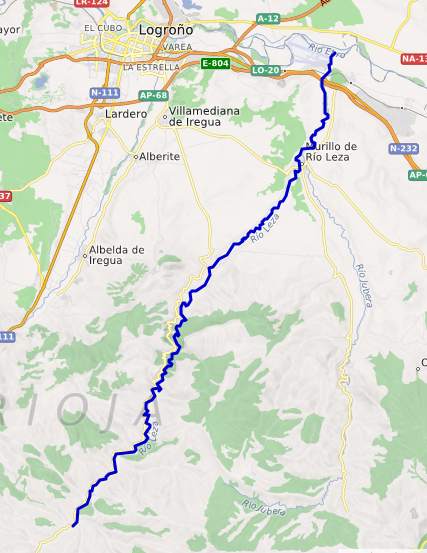
- Etymology: Basque for chasm

Location
- Country: Spain
- Region: La Rioja
- Comarca: Camero Viejo

Physical characteristics
- Source
  - elevation: 1500 m.
- Mouth: Ebro
  - coordinates: 42°27′31″N 2°18′09″W
- Length: 55 km (34 mi)
- Basin size: 565.32 km^{2} (218.27 mi^{2})

Basin features
- River system: Ebro
- Tributaries
  - right: Vadillos River, Rabanera River, Jubera River

The Leza River (Río Leza) is a short (55 km.) river in La Rioja, Spain, a right-hand tributary of the Ebro. It rises in the northern mountains of the Sierra de Monterreal range and flows northeast through the comarca of Camero Viejo.

It is known for its Garganta del Leza gorge, the Leza River Canyon, where limestone walls rise up to 500 meters above the river. It is part of the Biosphere Reserve of the Valleys of Leza, Jubera, Cidacos, and Alhama.

== Etymology ==
'Leza' is the Basque word which means chasm, gorge, or cave. The earliest reference to the river is as the Leça in the year 891 CE. Subsequent references beginning in 933 general use 'Leza', although the forms 'Leccenses' and 'Lenza' also occur.

== Geography ==
The headwaters of the Leza River lie in the northern part of the Parque Natural Sierra de Cebollera at an altitude of around 1500 meters between the peaks of Cerro Castillo (1690 m.) and Canto Hincado (1761 m.) on the south and Quiñon (1451 m.) to the north. The river flows in a northeasterly direction in the valley between the Sierra de Camero Viejo and the Sierra del Hayedo de Santiago. It receives water from small tributaries, the first of any size being the Vadillos and Rabanera rivers, right-hand tributaries near Jalón de Cameros. Between Soto en Cameros and Leza de Río Leza the river runs in a deep canyon. Near Murillo de Río Leza it receives its largest tributary, the Jubera River from the right. It finally flows into the Ebro a few kilometers west of the town of Agoncillo. The entire catchment area covers 565.32 km^{2}, being under sixty kilometers long and averaging about twenty-five kilometers across.

The settlements located in the Leza valley are: Agoncillo, Murillo de Río Leza, Leza de Río Leza, Ribafrecha, Arrúbal, Trevijano, Villanueva de San Prudencio, Soto en Cameros, Treguajantes, Luezas, Terroba, Montalbo, La Rioja, Santa María en Cameros, San Román de Cameros, Velilla, Jalón de Cameros, Torre en Cameros, Muro en Cameros, Cabezón de Cameros, Laguna de Cameros, Rabanera, Ajamil, Valdeosera, Hornillos de Cameros, Larriba, Torremuña, Vadillos and Avellaneda, La Rioja.

== History ==
The first settlers of the area, in the Neolithic era, were shepherds, who took advantage of the pastures in the mountain valleys in the summer beginning about 5000 BCE, as Neolithic herders migrating from the eastern Mediterranean. Archaeological studies of the remains at the nearby El Portalón de Cueva Mayor show both sheep and goats.

In 1366, the King Henry of Trastamara gave the area of the Cameros to his loyal follower Juan Ramírez de Arellano, later Count of Aguilar and Inestrillas, whose descendants remained the lords and landowners of the region for centuries.

== Resources ==
Traditionally the main economic activity has been grazing sheep, as well as goats and cattle.

The municipal areas of Agonzillo, Murillo de Río Leza, Ribafrecha and Leza de Río Leza belong to the wine-growing region of Rioja Baja.

== Points of interest ==
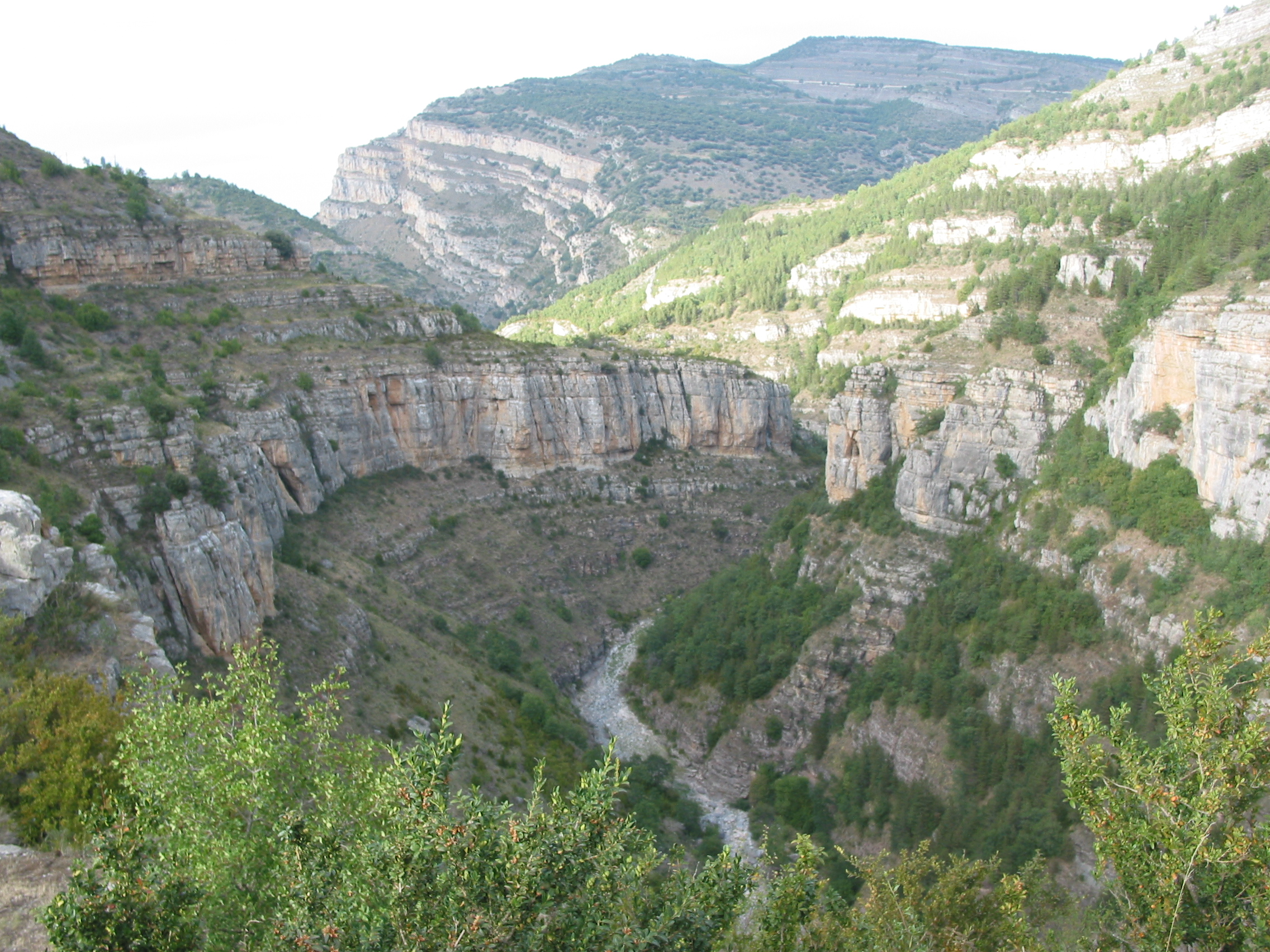
Leza River Canyon

- Leza River Bridge, ruins of a Roman bridge over the Leza near the village of Agoncillo
- The Leza River Canyon
