= Leza =

Leza may refer to:

== People ==
- Leza Lidow (1924–2014), artist
- Leza Lowitz (born 1962), American writer
- Leza McVey (1907–1984), American ceramist and weaver
- Marisa de Leza, Spanish film and television actress

== Places ==
- Leza, Álava, Spain
- Leza River
- Leza de Río Leza, Spain
