= Jalón de Cameros =

- Municipality
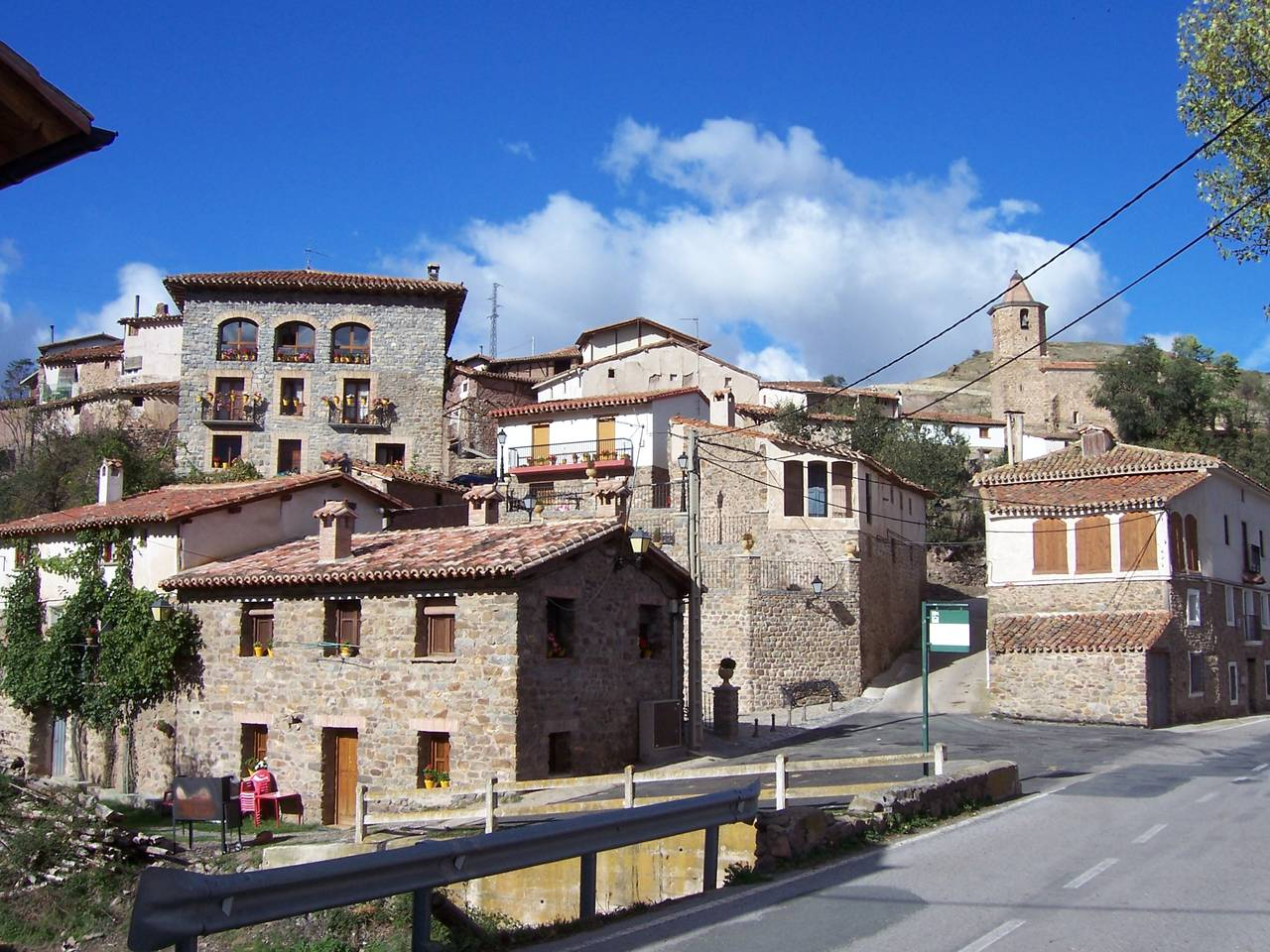
- Jalón de Cameros

- Location within La Rioja, Spain Location within Spain
- Coordinates: 42°13′05″N 2°29′18″W
- Country: Spain
- Autonomous community: La Rioja
- Comarca: Camero Viejo

Government
  - Mayor: Raquel Sáenz Blanco (PP)

Area
  - Total: 8.43 km^{2} (3.25 sq mi)
- Elevation: 882 m (2,894 ft)

Population (2025-01-01)
  - Total: 23
- Postal code: 26134
- Website: www.jalondecameros.org

Jalón de Cameros is a village in the province and autonomous community of La Rioja, Spain. The village is located above the Leza River and on the central road of the Camero Viejo. The municipality covers an area of 8.43 square kilometres (3.25 sq mi) In the Eighteenth Century: 841 hectare with 45.5 households (vecinos).

The area has been depopulating since the mid Twentieth Century, It had a population of 23 in 2023 down from 24 in 2011. The main economic activities are cattle raising and agriculture.

Inhabitants still celebrate a fiesta on 24–25 September in honor of Santo Cristo del Humilladero.

Traditionally known as Jalón the name was officially changed to Jalón de Cameros in 1916.
