= Trevijano =

- Populated place
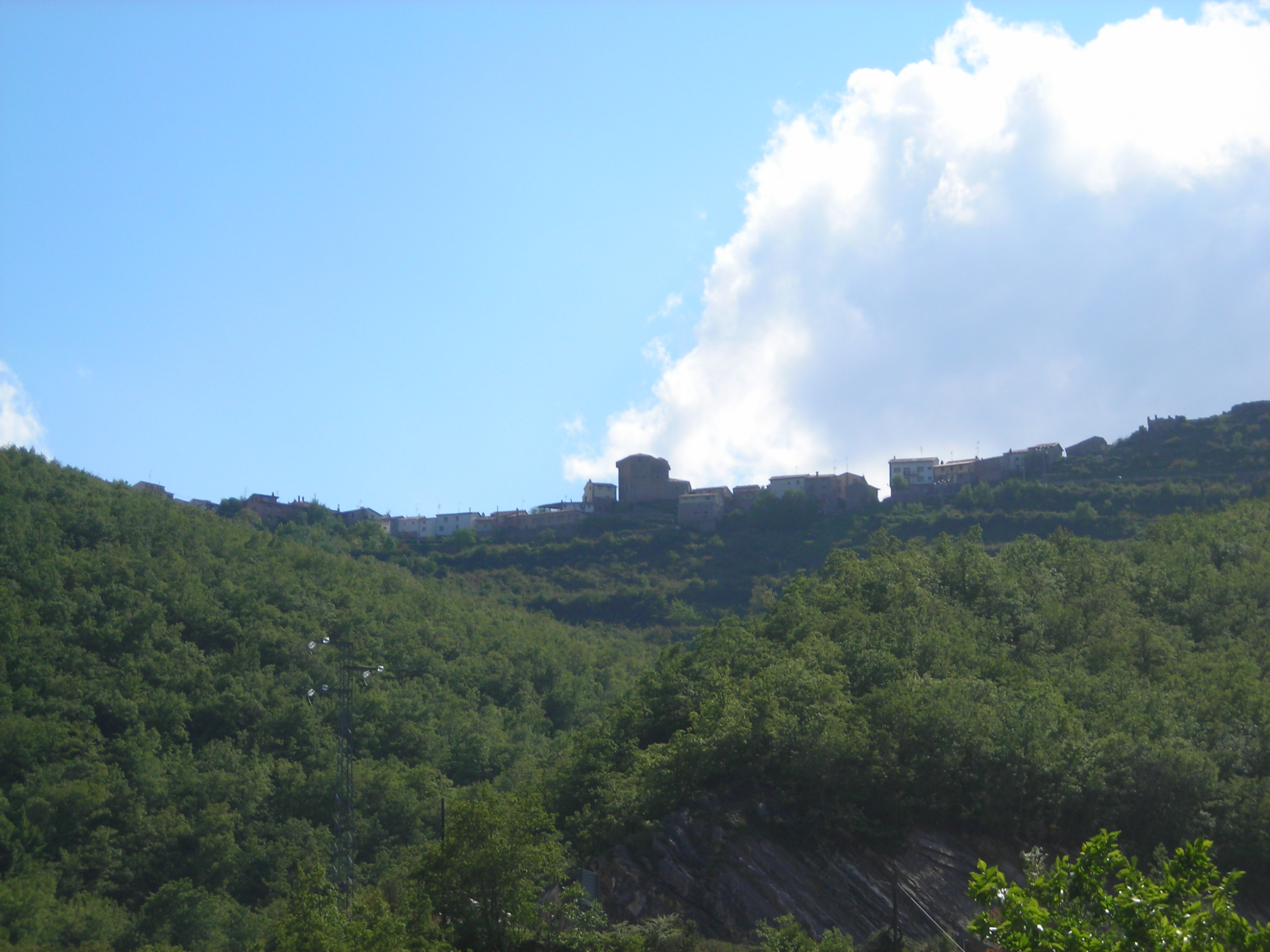
- View of Trevijano.

- Location within La Rioja, Spain Location within Spain
- Country: Spain
- Autonomous community: La Rioja
- Comarca: Camero Viejo

Population
  - Total: 17
- Postal code: 26132

Trevijano is a village in the municipality of Soto en Cameros, in the province and autonomous community of La Rioja, Spain. As of 2018 had a population of 17 people.
