= Francisco Elías de Tejada y Spínola =

Spanish philosopher (1917–1978)

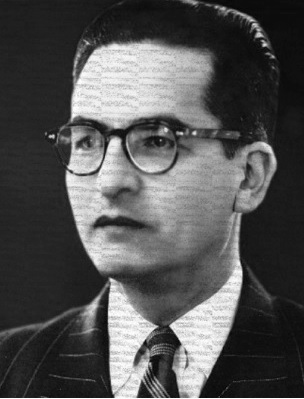
- Born: Francisco Elías de Tejada y Spínola; April 6, 1917; Madrid, Spain
- Died: February 18, 1978 (aged 60); Madrid, Spain

Academic background
- Education: Central University of Madrid; University of Seville
- Influences: Aquinas; Suárez; Vico; Robles; Mella

Academic work
- Discipline: Jurisprudence, History, Philosophy
- Sub-discipline: History of political thought
- School or tradition: Neoscholasticism; Traditionalism
- Main interests: Natural law

Francisco Elías de Tejada y Spínola Gómez (April 6, 1917 – February 18, 1978) was a Spanish scholar and a Carlist politician. He is considered one of top intellectuals of the Francoist era, though not necessarily of Francoism. As theorist of law he represented the school known as iusnaturalismo, as historian of political ideas he focused mostly on Hispanidad, and as theorist of politics he pursued a Traditionalist approach. As a Carlist he remained an ideologue rather than a political protagonist.

== Family and youth ==
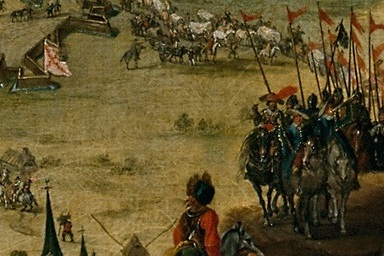
Siege of Breda by Peter Snayers

The Tejada family originated from Genoa; its branch moved to Naples and in the late Middle Ages to the Spanish La Rioja, settling at Muro de Cameros. In the early modern period its descendants transferred to Extremadura and few generations later they were already considered extremeños. Francisco's distant ancestor was the 17th-century knight Sancho de Tejada, whose son Elías excelled during the siege of Breda and got his name incorporated into the family surname. In the early 19th century the family, referred to as terratenientes hidalgos, held estates mostly in Castuera and Zalamea de la Serena. Francisco's grandfather made his name as a lawyer. Francisco's father, José Maria Elías de Tejada y de la Cueva (1891-1970), also practiced as abogado in Castuera. In 1913 he married Encarnación Spínola Gómez (1891-1953), heir to a wealthy local landowners family. It was at her Rinconada estate near Granja de Torrehermosa where Francisco and his only brother spent most of their childhood, raised in the profoundly Catholic ambience. Though born in Madrid, he considered Extremadura his mother region.

Since early childhood consuming sophisticated books and gifted with excellent memory, the young Francisco was first educated in the Jesuit college of Nuestra Señora de Recuerdo in the Madrid quarter of Chamartin. After its premises were ransacked in May 1931 and the order was expulsed soon afterwards, he continued his learning in the Portuguese Estremoz, still with the Jesuits. In 1933 Tejada obtained bachillerato, nostrified by University of Seville. Inspired by his Jesuit mentor Fernando María de Huidobro he decided to study law, though at Universidad Central in Madrid he pursued also philosophy and letters. Having graduated in both in 1935 he left to study in Germany. Outbreak of the Civil War caught him in Berlin; Tejada returned to Spain to learn that tens of his relatives were executed by the Republicans in Granja. In September in Calera de la Sierra he enlisted to Nationalist troops, first advancing to Toledo and then as artillery man serving during the battle of Madrid. In February 1937 he was admitted to Alféreces Provisionales school in Seville, soon abandoned for health reasons. In May 1937 he intended to join aviation, but in August he was nominated alférez asimilado at a logistics unit in Seville, remaining at this post until the end of the war.

Though described as heavily attracted to females, Elías de Tejada married as late as in 1962, at the age of 45. He wed an Italian 20 years his junior, Gabriella Pèrcopo Calet (1937-1986), descendant to a distinguished Neapolitan family of immense intellectual heritage, fluent in Spanish, perfectly familiar with the Spanish cultural realm and the PhD herself. Throughout the rest of his life she supported Tejada on all possible fields, as a secretary, proofreader, editor, erudite partner, co-author, organizer, academic inspiration and a soul mate. The couple had no children. Francisco Elías de Tejada Lozano, a Spanish diplomat in the 21st century serving as ambassador and high Foreign Ministry official, is descendant to Elías' brother.

== Academic career ==
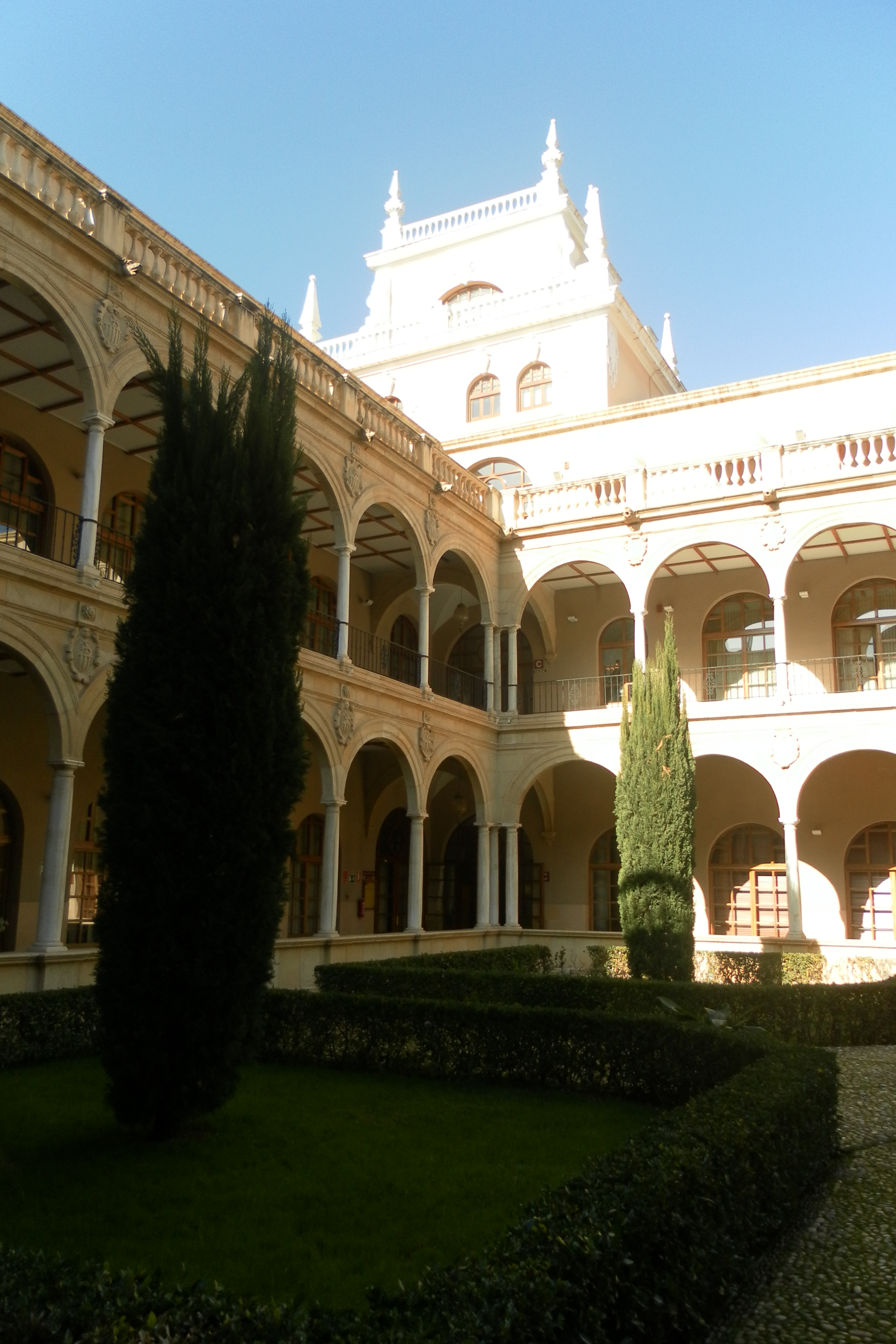
Murcia, Law Faculty

Already in 1935 Tejada was nominated Profesor Ayudante de Derecho Político in Madrid, an assignment held shortly as he soon left for Germany. When in the Nationalist army he was giving lectures at letters and philosophy courses organized by Universidad de Sevilla, in 1939 publishing his first works. Having obtained PhD laurels thanks to a thesis on Jerónimo Castillo de Bobadilla, in 1939 Tejada returned to Madrid as Professor Ayudante to assist Nicolás Pérez Serrano at Derecho Político. In 1940 he applied for chair of philosophy of law in Seville and Oviedo, but during the routine contest he was defeated by counter-candidates; referees described him as erudite and brilliant speaker, but also disoriented, immature, not adhering to the point, lacking reflexive spirit, excessively lyrical and repetitive. Also in 1940 Tejada left to pursue research abroad, having the unique opportunity to compare the early wartime realm in Berlin and in Oxford.

In March 1941 Tejada won the contest for chair of Derecho Natural y Filosofía del Derecho in Murcia; in 1942 he moved to Salamanca, having been the only contender. In 1951 he swapped chairs with Joaquín Ruiz Giménez Cortés and left for Seville, where he headed philosophy of law for the next 26 years, periodically chairing also the history of ideas. However, except the 1960-1961 course he spent the 1956-1964 period mostly pursuing research in Naples, with massive admin gimmicks on part of the university to find a legal framework for such a lengthy stay. Since 1964 he worked under the dedicación exclusiva contract. In 1969 nominated consejero honorario del Consejo Nacional de Educación, though his academic relations with the Francoist education authorities remained thorny.

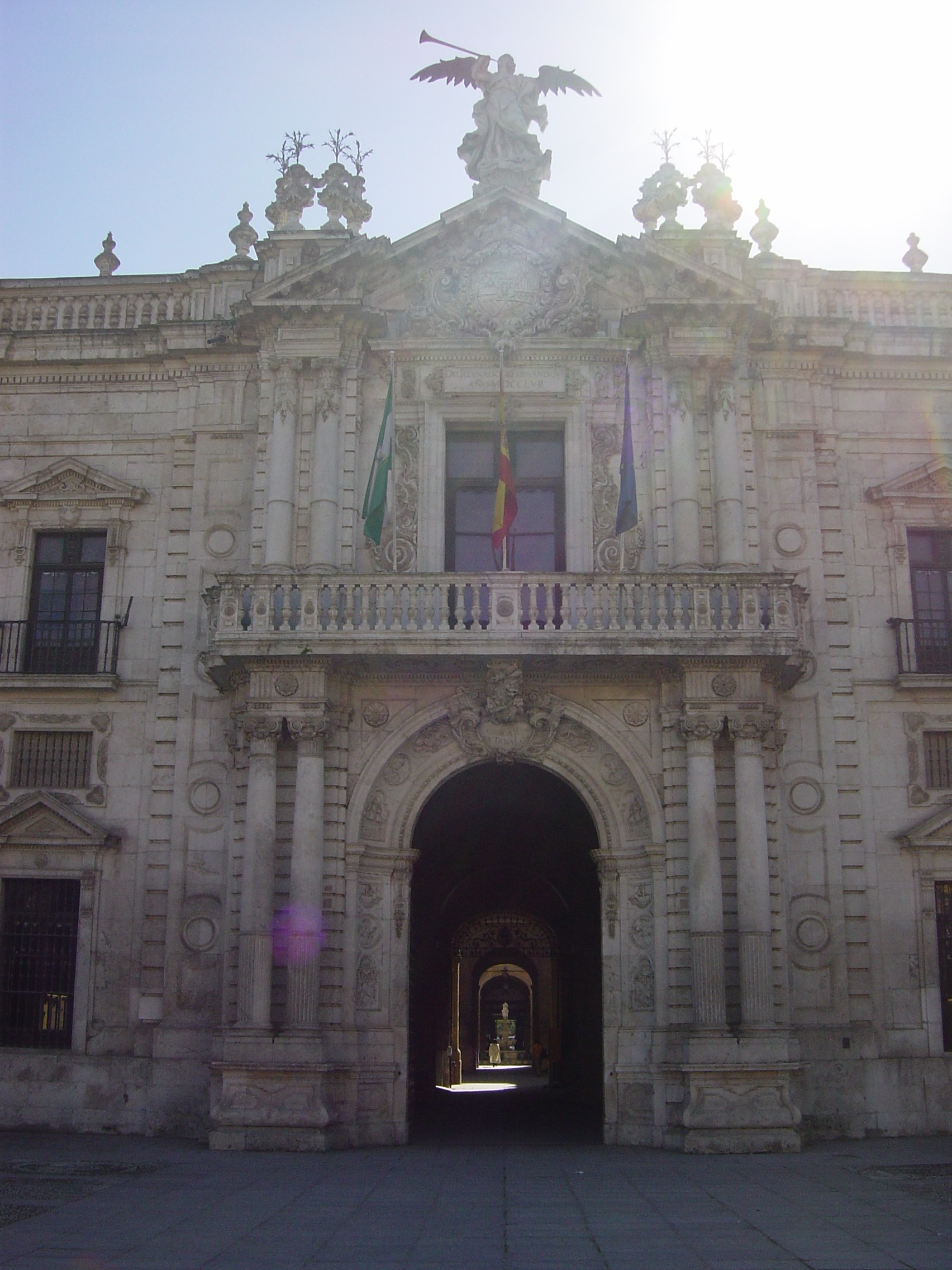
Seville, Recorate

Since the early 1970s Tejada intended to move to Madrid, but his 1971 and 1974 bids for Complutense failed. His 1975 bid for Universidad Autónoma took an awkward turn, when Tejada challenged the referees appointed as linguistically incompetent. His protest was dismissed and in 1976 he lost to Elías Díaz García, appealing the decision; the issue was not settled before his death. However, in 1977 he was appointed with no contest to cátedra de Derecho Natural y Filosofía del Derecho at Complutense; death interrupted his first course in Madrid.

Though member of a number of scientific institutions around the world, recipient of a few doctor honoris causa titles, a vastly prolific author and during his lifetime himself subject of 4 PhD dissertations, Tejada did not make it to the top elite of Spanish law scholars and did not enter Real Academia de Jurisprudencia y Legislación. There are conflicting accounts of his standing in the academic realm. Some claim that he was universally highly regarded as doctrinally intransigent but pro-student open-minded, tolerant scholar, as demonstrated by his supervision of PhD bid of Enrique Tierno Galván, the future key PSOE politician. Others present him as a feared "inquisidor", extremely quarrelsome hypocrite pursuing private goals and eager to call security when dealing with manifestations of student dissent towards him.

== Theorist of law ==
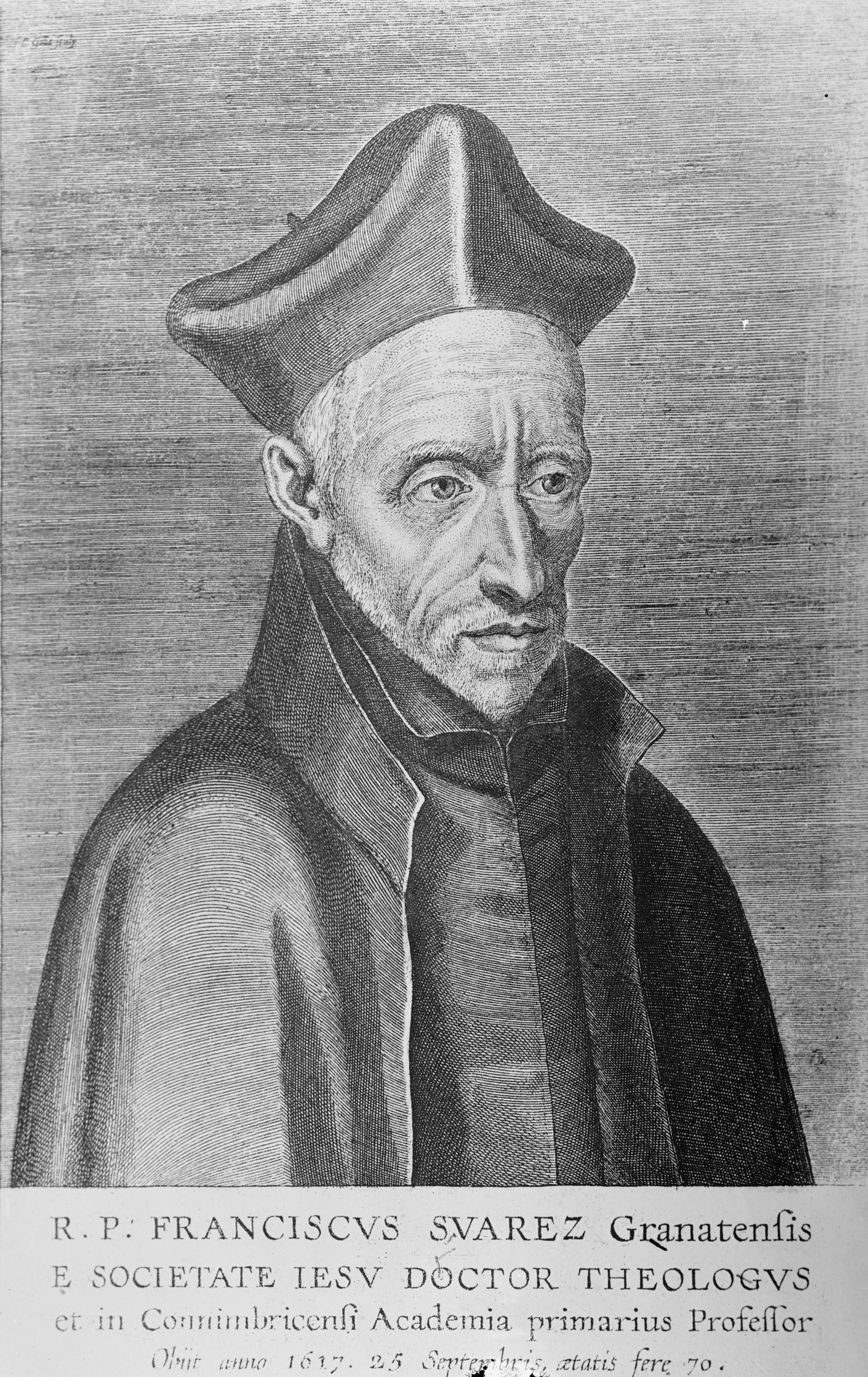
Francisco Suarez

Tejada is considered member of the natural law school and its key representative during the Franco era, influenced by early modern Spanish jurists like Francisco Suarez but mostly following the Aquinas; he regarded own work merely a gloss to the opus of St. Thomas. Hence, within iusnaturalismo he is classified as representative of Neo-Scholastic school, as opposed to Axiological, Neo-Kantian and Innovative Natural Law schools. Together with Michel Villey deemed a renovator of classical European iusnaturalismo of the mid-20th century, Tejada clearly distinguished own vision from "iusnaturalismo racionalista". Within this framework, he agreed that the role of jurisprudence was discovering rather than inventing.

Tejada's work consisted of systematizing concepts falling into ontology, anthropology, logic and axiology. His original contribution was merging them into a complete system and introducing a set of own concepts. He is considered not a mere follower but a scholar who developed Thomist juridical philosophy, credited for attempting a synthesis with existentialist school; some even view him as representative of legal Catholic Existentialism, a definition not accepted universally. He is noted as the moving spirit behind emergence of Asociación Internacional de Iusnaturalistas Hispánicos "Felipe II". Last but not least, Tejada is acknowledged as the one who inspired a number of scholars, both in Spain and in wider Hispanic realm, though not all his proposals have been accepted by his followers.

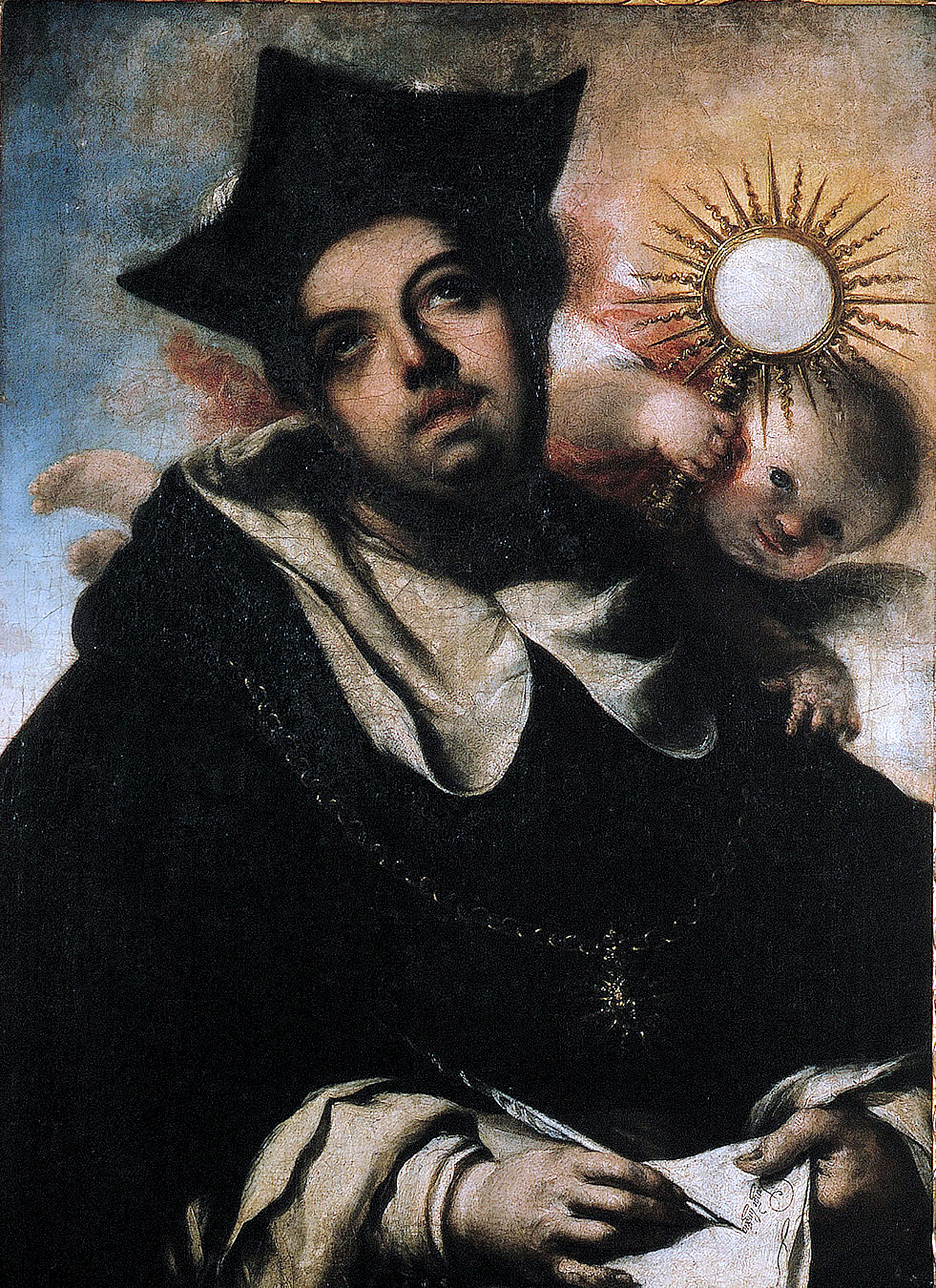
Thomas Aquinas by Francisco Herrera the Younger

For Tejada the law resulted from God assuming a decisive role, but rendering it possible to find acceptable reasons for an objective-value-based human agency; natural law stemmed from conjunction of divine power and human liberty. Its purpose was twofold: salvation and vocation, corresponding to justice in relations to God and security in relations to other people. Though some scholars point to some confusion as to the terms used, most agree that for Tejada law was "la norma política con contenido justo", colloquially described as where politics and ethics overlapped, a sovereign normative system related but clearly separate from religion. Some students conclude that Tejada was close to normativism, others find this suggestion too restrictive and claim that for him, law was far more than a norm. A distinctive thread of his jurisprudential discourse was its application to vastly distinct cultural realms, though he attempted to sublimate a specific Hispanic natural law.

Tejada kept writing on theory of law throughout all of his academic career; his first contribution was published in 1942 and his new pieces are being published posthumously. Except two volumes of Historia de la filosofía del derecho y del Estado (1946), until the very late of his life Tejada's works were mostly articles in specialized reviews, lectures delivered at jurisprudential conferences or compendium-like textbooks intended for students. Tejada's vastly erudite opus magnum, a systematic in-depth lecture gathering all his ideas on law theory was Tratado de filosofía del derecho, published in Seville in two volumes respectively in 1974 and 1977. It is not clear how many of his almost 400 works fall into theory of law, though their number might near one hundred.

== Historian of political thought ==
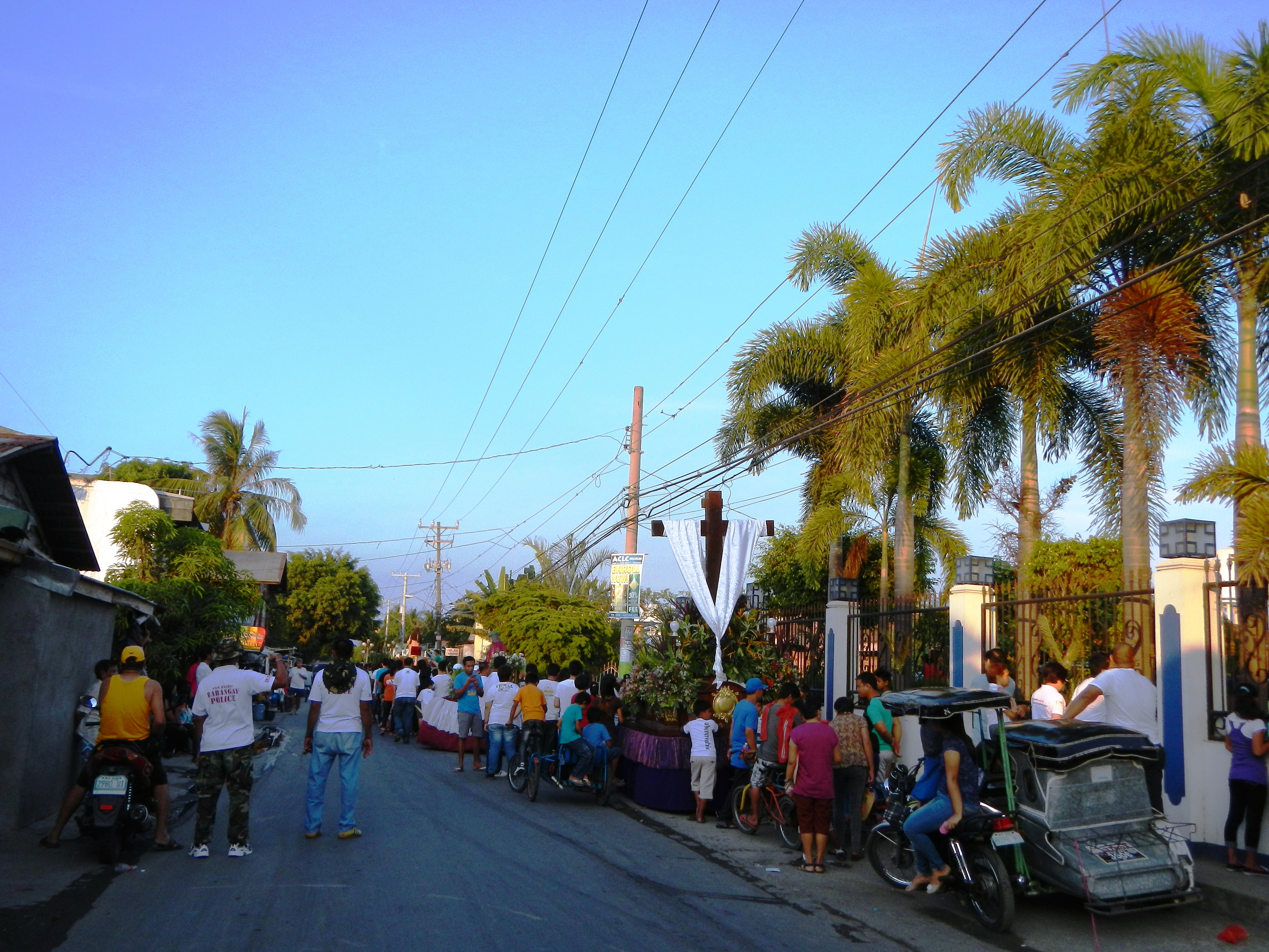
Hispanidad: observing Good Friday, 11,600 km from Madrid

As historian of political ideas Tejada clearly focused on broad Hispanic realm: he published studies on Castile, Catalonia, Navarre, Vascongadas, Extremadura, Valencia and Galicia, produced works intended as synthetic accounts for Spain and Portugal, dedicated separate works to Franche-Comté, Sardinia, Naples, Sicily, Flanders and Malta and wrote on Hispanic Florida, Texas and California, Portuguese holdings in Africa and Asia, the Philippines, Chile, Brazil, Colombia and Latin America in general. However, his comparatistic zeal made him discuss history of political thought also beyond the Lusitanic and Hispanic realm, e.g. in England, Arabic and Sephardic traditions, Germany, Greece, Sweden, Norway, Iceland, Hungary, Japan, Thailand, Borneo, Ethiopia, Mozambique and elsewhere.

Tejada strove to reconstruct and define a Hispanic political tradition and vacillated between the role of historian and theorist. His understanding of Hispanidad was based on the concept of Las Españas, seen as embodied in confederal political shape but its essence having been pre-state commonality. Relying on the unity in diversity recipé and incorporating local traditions, including the fueros, Hispanic tradition consisted of two features: Catholic vision of life combined with missionary universalist spirit pursued by a federative monarchy. According to Tejada Hispanidad was born in the Middle Ages, climaxed during the early España de los Austrias and declined due to centralist French tradition imported by the Borbones. His recurring subject was confronting Hispanic and European traditions, the latter born out of anti-Catholic, revolutionary, modernist thought and ultimately responsible for breaking the Hispanic community by force.

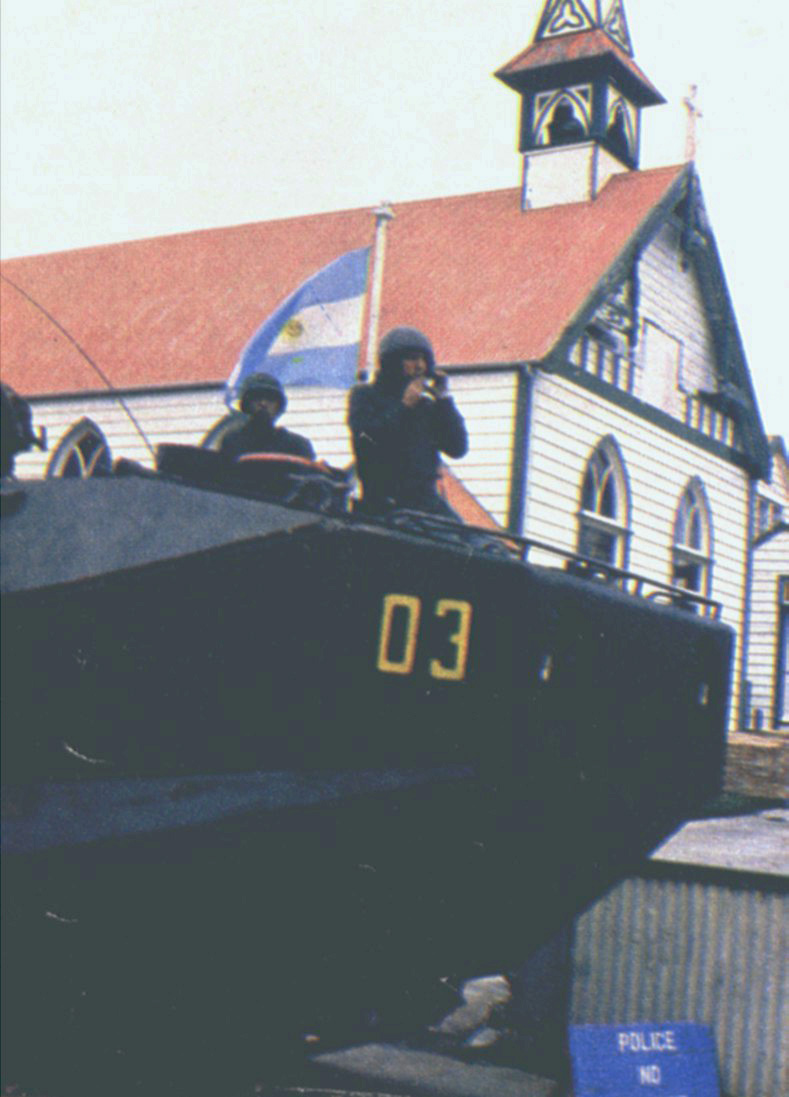
Hispanidad: fighting the British, 11,600 km from Madrid

Tejada understood political thought as a vehicle of sustaining tradition and ignored the imperial and ethnic dimensions of Hispanidad. He viewed the Hispanic political community as forged by will of the people forming its components, not as a result of conquest. Ethnic features were merely means of transmitting heritage and a nation was defined as commonality of tradition, as opposed to positivist definitions focusing on features like language, geography, regime etc.; it enabled implantation of Hispanidad in vastly different settings of the Philippines, Uruguay or Franche-Comté. Tejada saw the Hispanic tradition against a decisively providential background, e.g. when confronting Islam, Protestantism or the New World; scholars saw this approach as indebted to the vision of Giambattista Vico. Another frequently applied personal comparison was that to Marcelino Menéndez Pelayo: the two shared passion for Hispanic patrimony, massive erudition, reconstructive profile and Traditionalist leaning; Tejada's approach is dubbed "menéndezpelayismo".

Tejada's first work on history of political thought appeared in 1937 and the last ones in 1977. Unlike in case of theory of law, he did not produce a synthesis which would stand out; his thought is scattered across countless books, articles or minor opúsculos. Single works to be listed first are perhaps case studies, the monumental Nápoles hispánico (1958-1964) and an unfinished Historia del pensamiento político catalán (1963-1965). Publications attempting more general overview to be named are La causa diferenciadora de las comunidades políticas (1943), Las Españas (1948) and Historia de la literatura política en las Españas (1952, published 1991).

== Theorist of politics ==
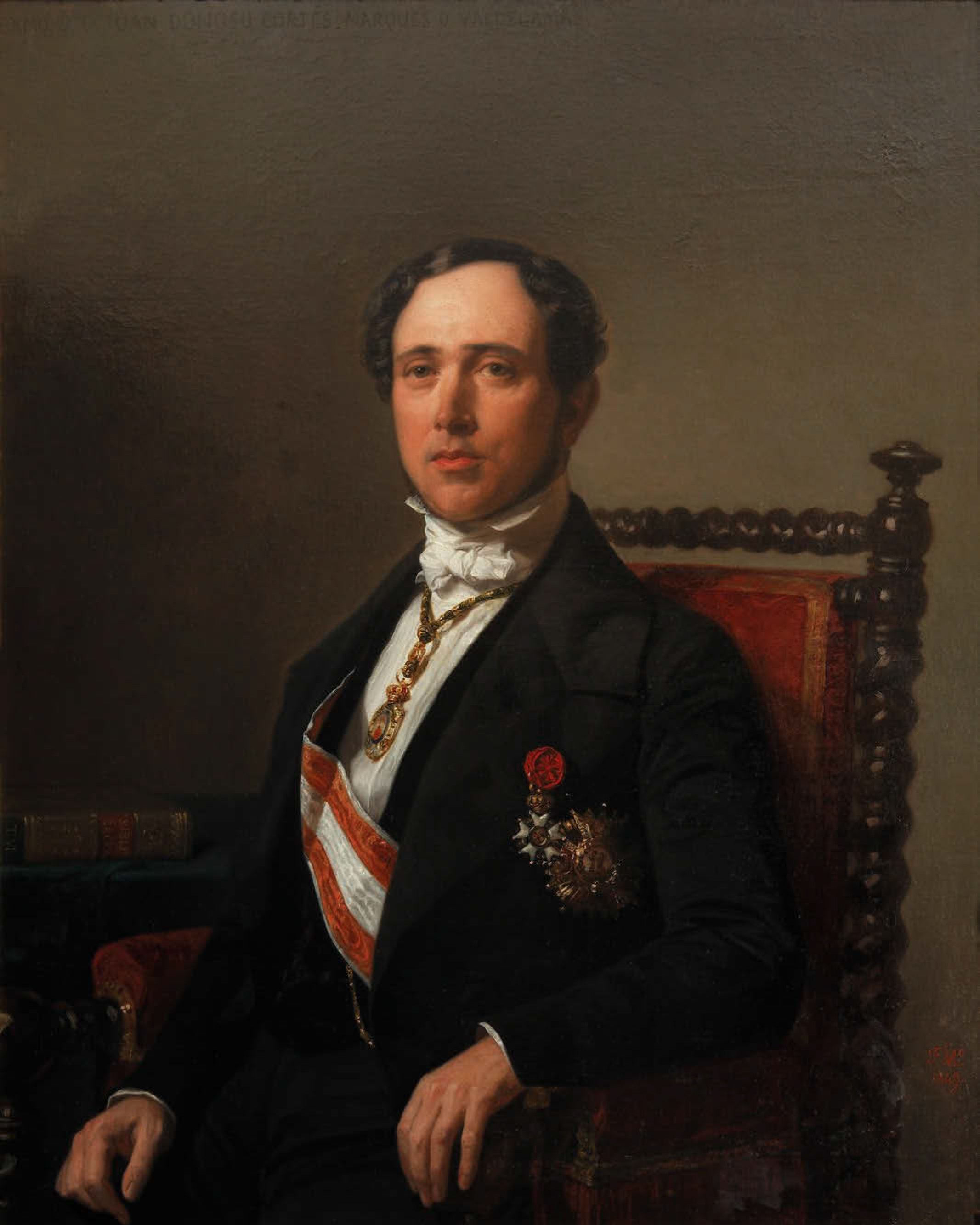
Traditionalism: Donoso

Initially Tejada developed a Hispanidad-oriented leadership theory of authoritarian state; according to some in the early 1940s he performed a volte-face becoming a vehement anti-Francoist, according to the others during decades to come his theory was progressively dissociated from Francoism, some see 3 phases of his evolution and some advance rambling summaries. Some scholars highlight 1938-1940 works and consider him "superfascista", most students tend to downplay caudillaje-related writings and focusing on the 1942-1978 period see Tejada as a Traditionalist; few advance an in-between option of "franquismo neotradicionalista". Among those supporting the Traditionalist tag many consider him "maximo representante del pensamiento tradicionalista español en la segunda mitad del siglo XX" or at least one of the key ones, though some present him as a second-rank theorist.

Tejada perceived Traditionalism as a unique Spanish response to the 1515-1648 rupture in European political thought; the latter afterwards degenerated into absolutism, liberalism, totalitarianism, and most recently into secular, parliamentarian, free-market, nation-state democracies. Traditionalism itself was politically best embodied in Carlism. Its essence was threefold. First, it consisted of Catholic unity; some scholars claim that Tejada was opposed to religious liberty, others maintain that he was opposed to equality of faiths and advocated a state-endorsed Catholic orthodoxy. Second, it embraced historical, social, accountable, representative, foral, federative, missionary, organic and hereditary monarchy. Third, it was based on a subsidiary state model. The latter marked total reversal from original Tejada's penchant for omnipotent leadership and reflected the Traditionalist logic of state serving society, society serving man, and man serving God. A de-centralized withdrawn state, with its functions reduced, is to provide merely a framework for communities making it up, developed historically and safeguarded by separate legal establishments; The communities in question are to be governed by autonomous intermediary bodies and should participate in state politics represented in the Cortes by delegates of various "gremios, hermandades, agrupaciones, cámaras, comunidades y cofradías"; Tejada juxtaposed Spanish communitarian fueros against the French individual liberties. According to some, the proposal advanced by Tejada was intended as a discussion how Spain should look like after Franco.

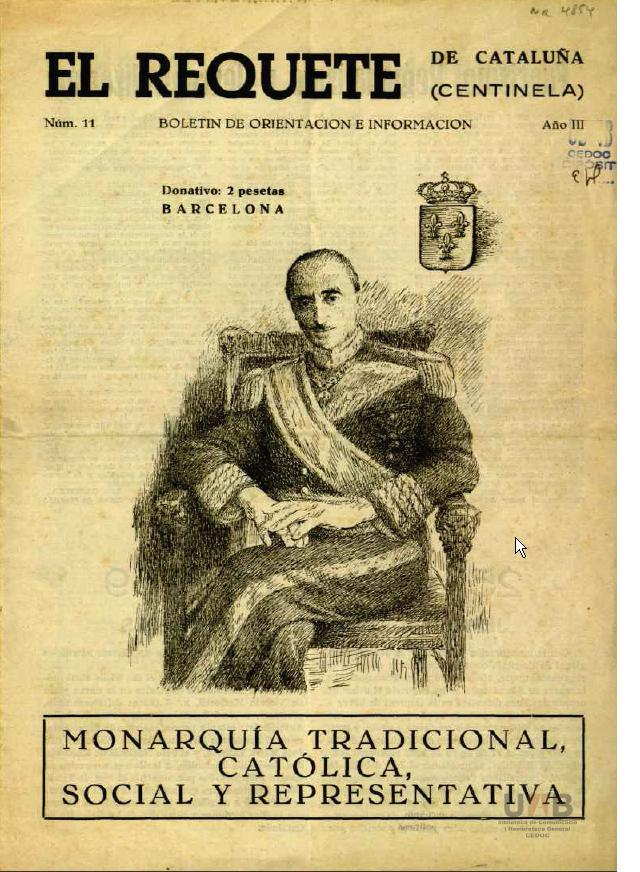

Tejada's works on theory of politics are visibly less numerous than those on theory of law or on history of political thought; moreover, some of them resemble political manifestos rather than scholarly writings. Preceded by caudillaje-oriented brochures of the late 1930s, the main body of his Traditionalism was laid out mostly in the 1950s, following activity in Academia Vázquez de Mella; its most complete and straightforward lecture was La monarquía tradicional (1954), though some, like El tradicionalismo político español, remained in manuscript. The vision was further refined in details in the 1960s, especially during Congresses of Traditionalist Studies and systematically revisited in the early 1970s, mostly as result of political struggle taking place within Carlism: a lengthy manuscript was reduced into a manual-styled script - officially co-authored with Rafael Gambra Ciudad and Francisco Puy Muñoz - ¿Qué es el carlismo? (1971), with late re-workings and compilations published either shortly before death or posthumously.

== Carlist: around Francoism (1936–1950) ==
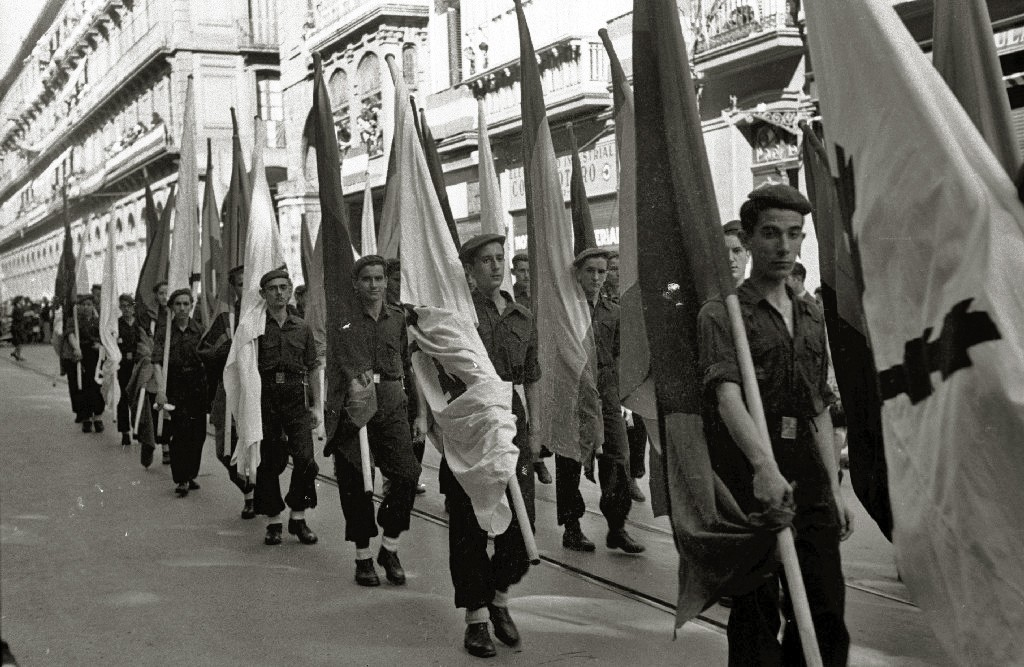
Requete on parade

Some authors maintain that there were no Carlist antecedents in the Tejada family; however, records reveal that a Justiniano Elías de Tejada, though initially opposing neo-Catholic designs in the 1860s, in the early 1870s turned president of Junta Carlista de Castuera and was even subject to jokes because of that. Francisco himself claimed he had joined Comunión Tradicionalista at the age of 15, remained a Carlist during his adolescence and in 1936 returned from Germany to enlist to the Nationalist army responding to the call of his king, Alfonso Carlos, though he provided also conflicting or confusing accounts.

Nothing is known about Tejada's political activity during the Civil War and soon afterwards; though seconded to a Falangist unit, he is not mentioned as engaged in Carlist, Falangist or other party structures until the early 1940s. However, his writings published in 1938-1939 clearly identified him as enthusiast of national syndicalism and the caudillaje system; some consider him concerned primarily with justifying the regime. He admitted great juvenile admiration for Hitler. It was the second stay in Germany in 1940 that got him disillusioned with omnipotent state and single party; his 1940 article discussing caudillaje was notably tuned down and introduced a cautious tone. In the early 1940s he was assuming an increasingly dissenting stance. In 1942 he referred to "miseria" of the Francoist system; the same year he was briefly detained for opposing subscriptions to División Azul. Though he had no chance to publish writings lambasting the system as anti-Catholic tyranny, Tejada made little secret of his views and in the Salamanca law faculty he voted against granting Franco doctorado honoris causa. In 1944 a Falangist hit-squad stormed into his house, dragged him to the nearby Retiro park and left him beaten unconscious.

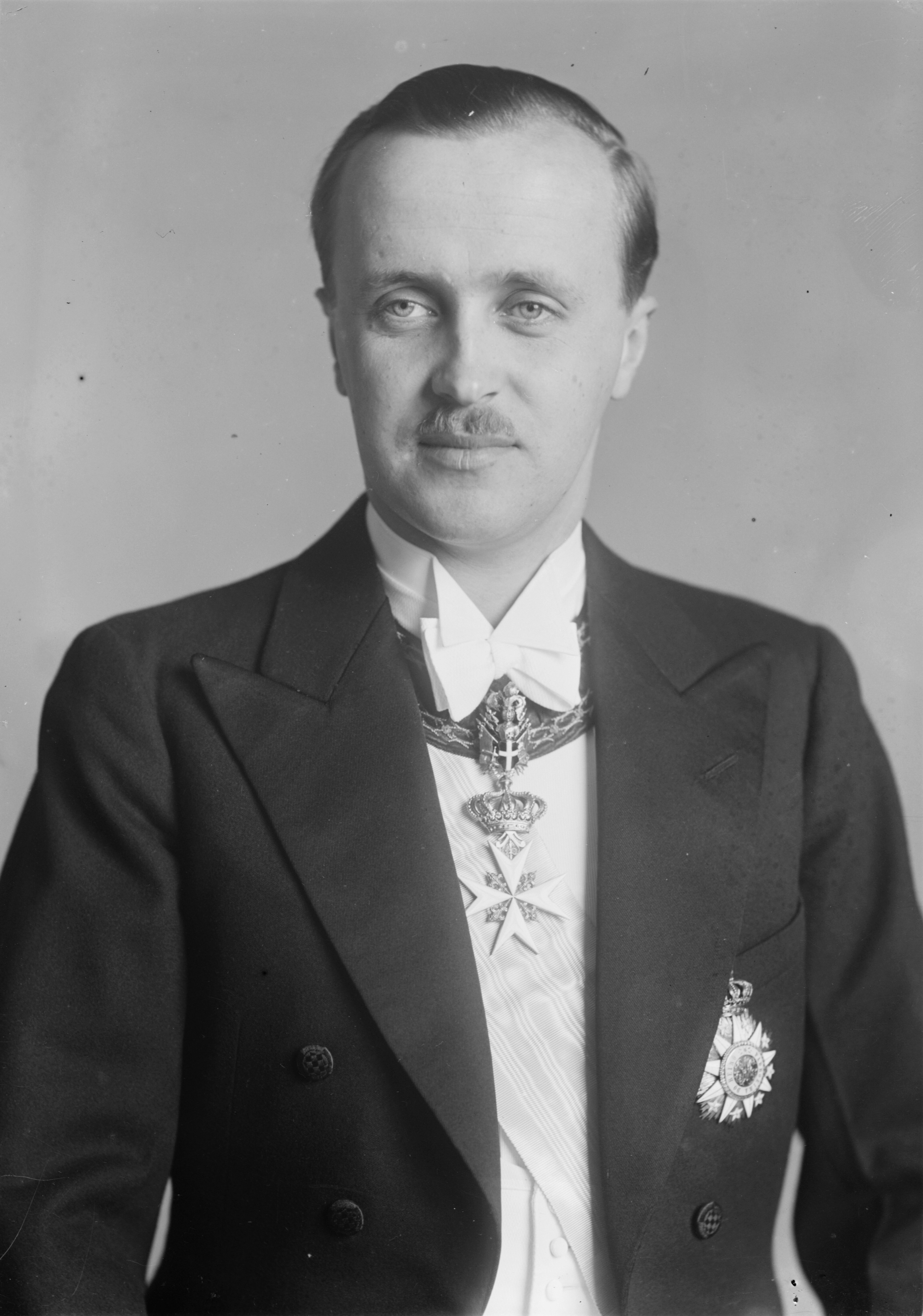
Dom Duarte Nuno

In the mid-1940s Tejada again neared Carlism, at that time with no king, divided into few factions and politically bewildered. First commencing co-operation with their periodicals, in the Madrid cafes he mixed with Carlists of different persuasions, including the pro-collaborationist Carloctavistas and the intransigent orthodox Javieristas; he also took part in their minor public manifestations against the regime. In unspecified circumstances, though most likely acting in agreement if not on request of the then Carlist political leader Manuel Fal Conde, Tejada ventured to co-organize a semi-official Traditionalist cultural network, which materialized as the Madrid Academia Vázquez de Mella; in the late 1940s he was among its most active lecturers. Now openly confronting the regime and in 1947 advocating a "no" vote in the Ley de Sucesión referendum, politically Tejada avoided clear identification with any of the Carlist groupings. He seemed closest to supporters of Dom Duarte Nuño de Braganza as a potential Carlist heir; according to other sources he merely considered the Portuguese claimant a viable candidate. The period of vacillation ended in 1950, when Tejada aligned with the Javieristas and accepted seat in their national executive, in 1951 nominated by Don Javier commissioner of Comunión Tradicionalista external affairs.

== Carlist: Javierista (1950–1962) ==
Carlist standard

In the early 1950s Tejada got firmly engaged in mainstream Carlism and demonstrated an uncompromising political stand. He lambasted the dissenting Carloctavistas, complained to Fal about permissive, increasingly Christian-Democratic profile of a semi-official Carlist daily Informaciones, and advocated that Don Javier goes bold by terminating the long overdue regency. He co-drafted Declaración de Barcelona, the statement which was issued by Don Javier in 1952 and which indeed announced his own claim to the Carlist throne, though the episode is not entirely clear. With the 1954 publication of La monarquía tradicional Tejada became the top Carlist theorist; the same year within the party top body, Junta Nacional, he formed part of Comisión de Cultura y Propaganda. At that time he was considered among key politicians of Carlism.

When in 1955 Fal Conde was released from Jefatura and when Carlism abandoned intransigent opposition to the regime in favor of cautious co-operation, Tejada was left puzzled. He did not hesitate to voice his doubts about collaborative strategy advocated by the new leader Jose Maria Valiente, yet he decided to comply and accepted appointment to the newly formed Secretariat; moreover, at one point he suggested that the body be dissolved as ineffective and replaced by Valiente's personal jefatura. Executing the rapprochement policy he did not believe in its success and was getting increasingly frustrated by Franco's rejection of the Carlist offer. However, he readily engaged in new formats of activity, now permitted by the regime: Tejada was active in the Carlist publishing house Ediciones Montejurra and became its director, animated the elitist Traditionalist periodical Reconquista, contributed to new periodicals like Azada y Asta and especially threw himself into organizing Círculos Culturales Vázquez de Mella, a semi-official Carlist institutional network. In 1960 he entered Comisión de Cultura of the Carlist executive and advocated setting up an "Instituto de Estudios Jurídicos".

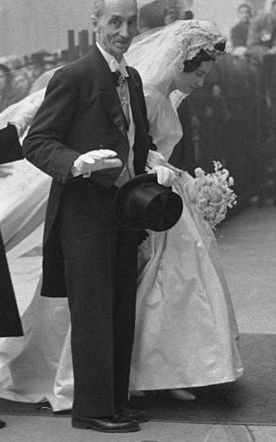
Don Javier, 1960

Having moved on longtime scientific research mission to Italy, at the turn of the decades Tejada was getting increasingly detached from daily Carlist politics. Within the Secretariat and numerous cultural outposts he was somewhat sidetracked by a new breed of young activists forming the entourage of prince Carlos Hugo. Though he knew some, especially their leader Ramón Massó, from the Academia Vázquez de Mella years of the 1940s, Tejada developed grave doubts about Carlist orthodoxy and genuine intentions of the hugocarlistas, suspecting them of pursuing a hidden agenda. Co-operation deteriorated into crisis and then open conflict in the early 1960s, when Don Carlos Hugo started to sidetrack most hard-line Traditionalists. Tejada did not illude himself about Don Javier potentially confronting his progressist son, and in July 1962 he decided to break with the Borbón-Parmas; some authors claim that he was expulsed. He declared to Don Carlos Hugo that he could not make him king, but could prevent him from becoming one. In 1963 Tejada already referred to Don Carlos Hugo as "este aventurero francés de sangre bastarda".

== Carlist: fighting the progressists (1962–1978) ==
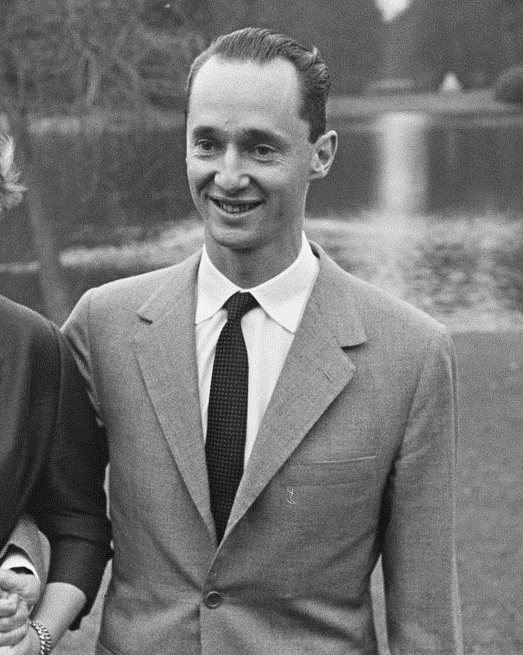
Don Carlos Hugo, 1964

After the breakup Tejada did not join any Carlist faction, though he was reportedly sympathetic to RENACE: he liked its format of depositary of Traditionalist values with no support for any specific claimant. He embarked on building a network of institutions marketing orthodox Traditionalism. In 1963 he co-founded the Madrid-based Centro de Estudios Históricos y Políticos General Zumalacárregui; though officially affiliated with Secretariado General de Movimiento Nacional, it was intended as a Carlist think-tank. Its activity climaxed in two Congresos de Estudios Tradicionalistas, staged in 1964 and 1968; Centro issued also periodicals and organized so-called Jornadas Forales across the country.

In the first half of the 1960s Tejada emerged as chief ideologue of Juntas de Defensa del Carlismo, network mushrooming across the country and united by opposition to hugocarlismo; he also contributed to launch of a new periodical, Siempre. In mid-1960s Tejada was firmly established among leaders of loosely organized followers of orthodox Traditionalism; his activity was increasingly leaning towards vague dynastical compromise, intended to block the Borbón-Parmas; this strategy led him close to Carloctavistas and Sivattistas. In 1966 he supported referendum on Ley Organica, considering it a stepping stone towards a Traditionalist ideal; despite this, some scholars dub him "isolated anti-regime sniper". In 1968 Franco, always keen to exploit differences, received Tejada to discuss the monarchical question; during their only personal meeting, the dictator was treated to legitimist discourse reverting to the Braganza solution.

The turn of the decades spelled a political disaster for Tejada: the Alfonsist pretender was nominated as the future king and Carlism was firmly taken over by the hugocarlistas. On the official front, in 1972 he was trialed for anti-government remarks. On the Carlist front, his 1971 last-minute doctrinal summary, ¿Qué es el carlismo?, made the Traditionalist position crystal clear, but failed to prevent transformation of Javierismo into the socialist-dominated Partido Carlista. During last years of Francoism he witnessed and indeed contributed to increasing decomposition of Traditionalism. In 1972 he was skeptical about launching an anti-hugocarlista organization on the Requeté basis and ridiculed its leaders, attracting some criticism in return. However, he engaged in another anti-hugocarlista initiative, Real Tercio de Requetés de Castilla, and neared the youngest of the Borbón-Parmas, Don Sixto, considered even his intellectual mentor. In 1975 he accepted Don Sixto as royal leader, though neither as a claimant nor regent but as a vaguely styled "abanderado de la Tradición".

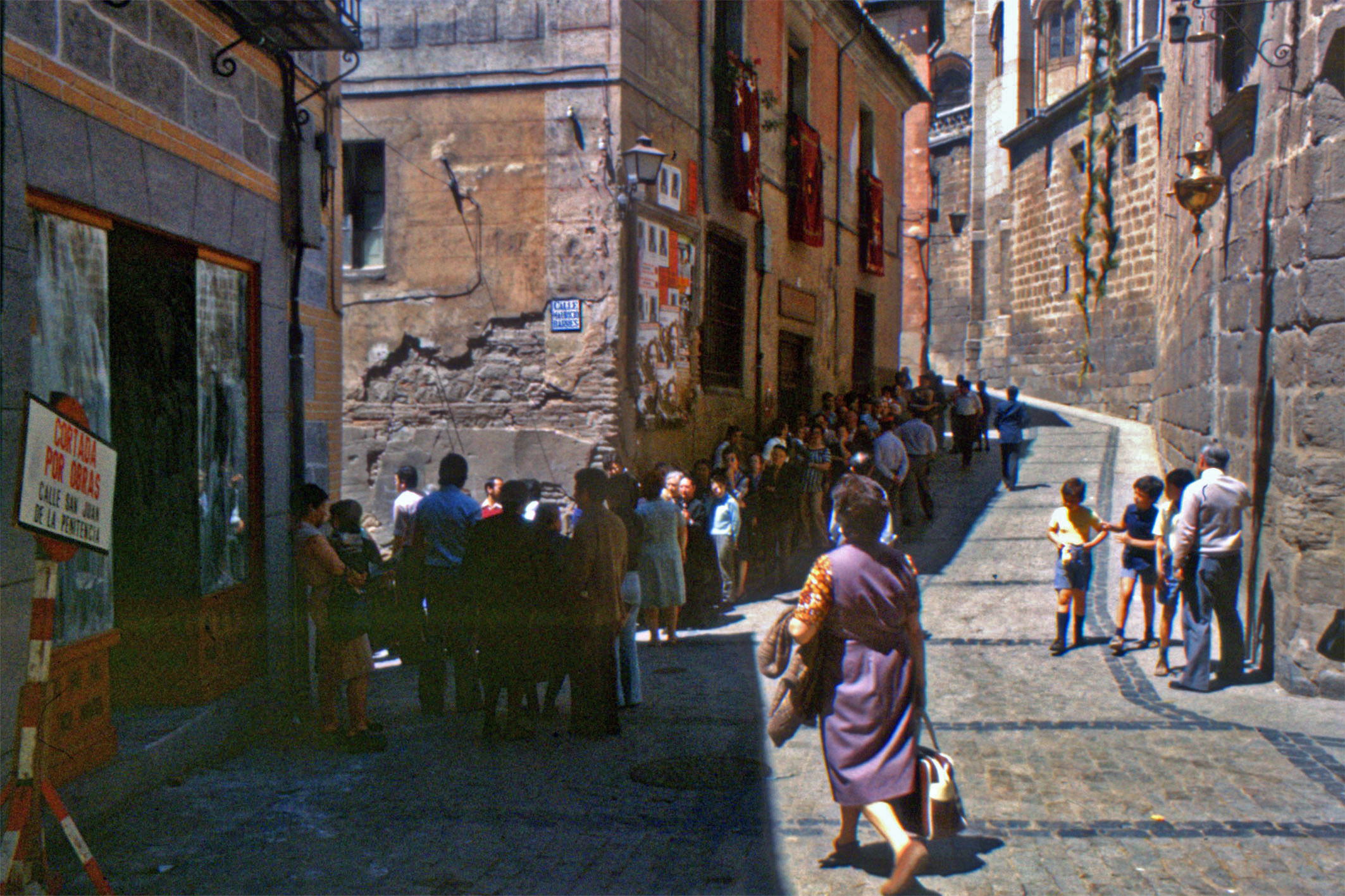
elections in Spain, 1977

In bitter public skirmishes with partisans of Partido Carlista, following death of Franco Tejada attempted to build a new Carlist organization, born in 1977 as Comunión Católico-Monárquica-Legitimista. During the electoral campaign it joined forces with Unión Nacional Española and Fuerza Nueva in Alianza Nacional 18 de Julio; Tejada was scheduled to run from the Seville list for the Senate. When leaders of the alliance declared themselves faithful to the thought of Franco he replied in public that Franco was the greatest ever enemy of Carlism and withdrew. In one of his last interviews he expressed anxiety about forthcoming partidocracia.

== Reception and legacy ==
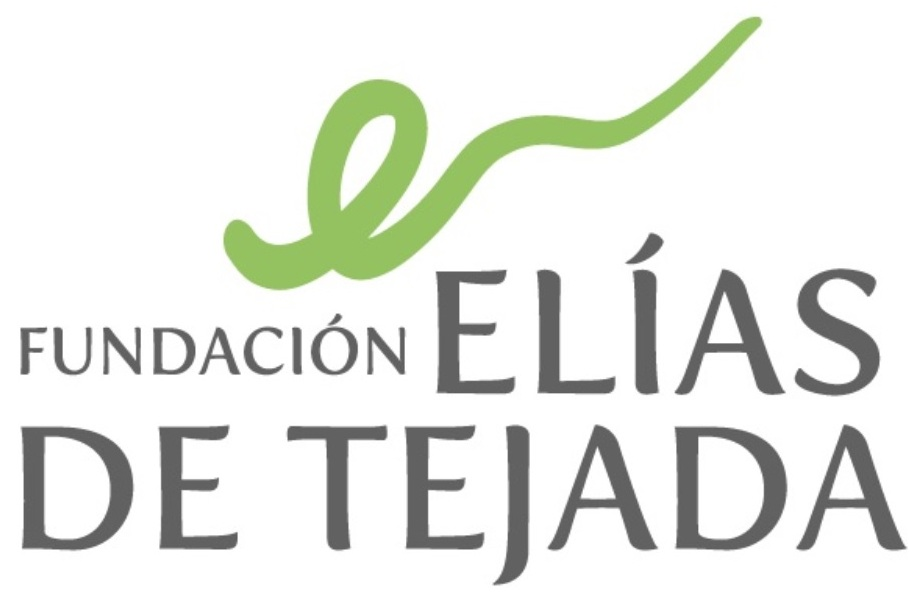
Fundación Elías de Tejada logo

In the post-war Spain Tejada gained prominence principally as a theorist of law; present day scholars either suggest that Francoist setting provided a favorable background for domination of iusnaturalismo against other schools, or bluntly claim that Neoescolástica was the regime's means of auto-legitimization, enforced and disguised as "pluralism". His writings on history of political thought were appreciated if could have been presented as picturing the regime as ultimate climax of Hispanic tradition, while Traditionalist theory of politics – acceptable in the 1950s – when assuming a decisively Carlist flavor was clearly unwelcome in the 1970s.

During and after the Second Restoration Tejada's opus went dramatically out of fashion; already by the end of his life he was invoked in the press as a ridiculous fanatic who did not even merit a response, while later – among occasional courteous references – he was venomously denounced as "distinguida personalidad del franquismo". In 1986 Gabriella Pèrcopo co-founded Fundación Francisco Elías de Tejada, which pays tribute to his thought by promoting Hispanic studies. Two institutions he set up, Centro Zumalacárregui and Asociación "Felipe II", are active until today, organizing conferences and issuing own publications; some of these initiatives are supported financially by Ministry of Education and Real Academia de Ciencias Morales y Políticas. RACMYP holds also a massive Tejada's library.

Already in 1977 Tejada lamented that Spanish universities were becoming mimetic replicas of the European ones; some claim that indeed, in the 1980s and 1990s Traditionalism as scientific school was almost entirely eradicated from Spanish academic realm, though they also point to a number of active scholars who might be considered either Tejada's disciples or heavily influenced by his thought. Beyond the Hispanic and Lusitanian realm it hardly made an impact, though there are exceptions. Bibliography on Elías is nearing a hundred titles. The key one is a monograph by Miguel Ayuso (1994); apart from three other volumes, the remaining titles are articles fathered mostly by his followers and published in specialized reviews. The 2008 anniversary of Tejada's death produced a few memorial articles ranging from Chile to Poland.

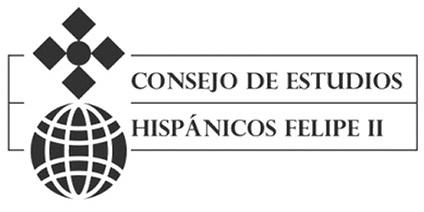
CdEH "Felipe II" logo

General assessment of Tejada's scholarly standing seems far from agreed. Some point to his massive production and suggest that having been among greatest intellectuals of his time he led a school of his own, building a holistic "sistema tejadiano" or "pensamiento tejadiano". Others consider him either mostly a law theorist or mostly a student of Hispanidad. His followers point also to his charming personality and acknowledging massive erudition, call him a genius monster. Others suggest that he was a little-minded, vindictive, impossible to deal with bigot of an overgrown ego, his career enabled by anti-democratic nature of the Francoist regime, dubbed "reaccionario" and the passion of his life, "tradición española", referred to as "ni es tradición ni es española". In the compromise version, he is either presented as notable but second-rate representative of Traditionalism or as an erudite eminent for some of his case studies.

== See also ==
- Carlism
- Natural law
- Hispanidad
- Rafael Gambra Ciudad
