= San Román de Cameros =

- Municipality
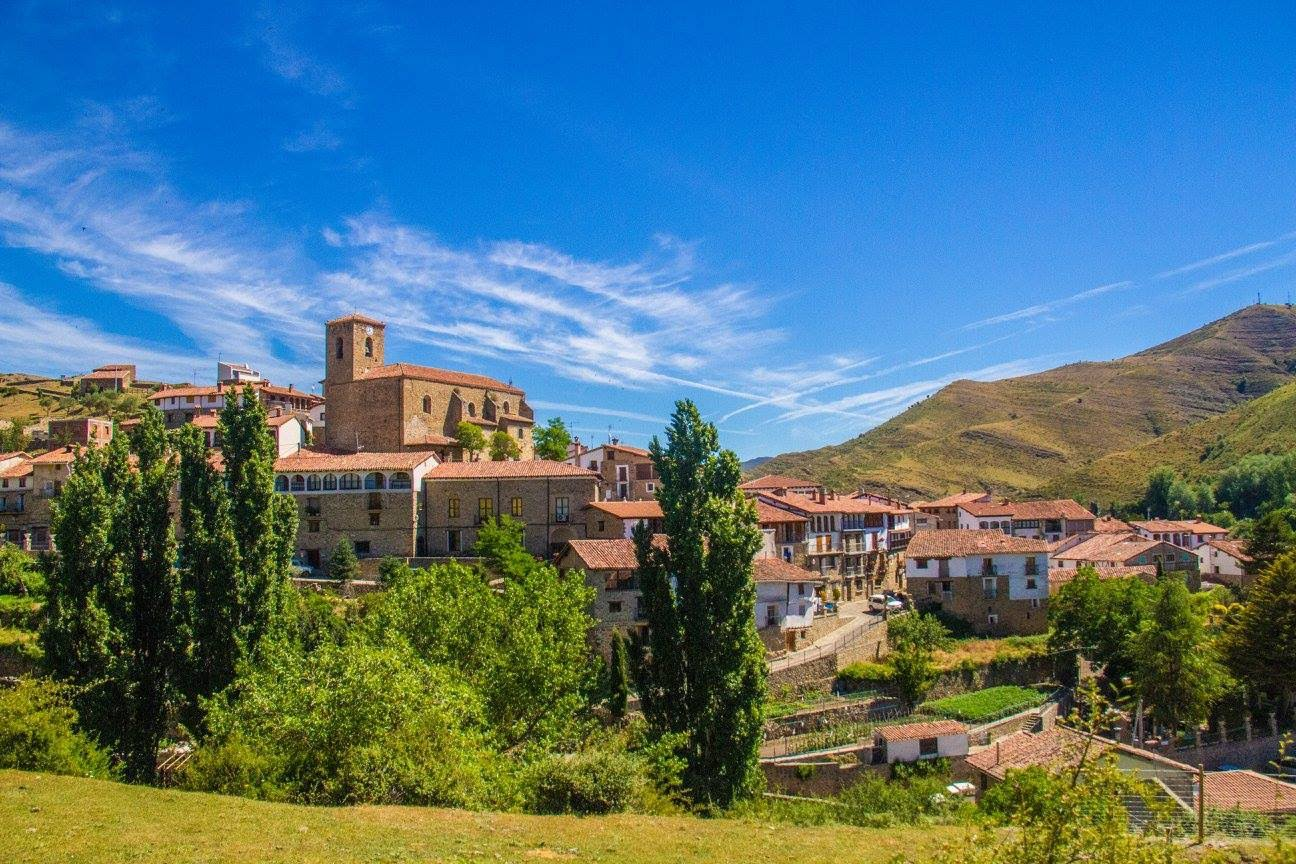
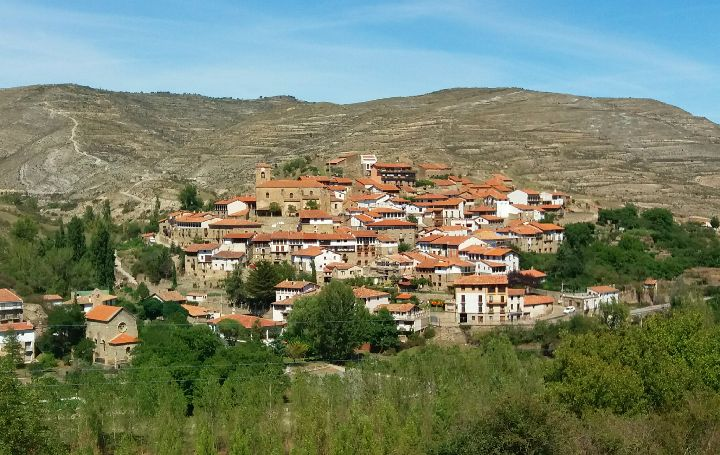
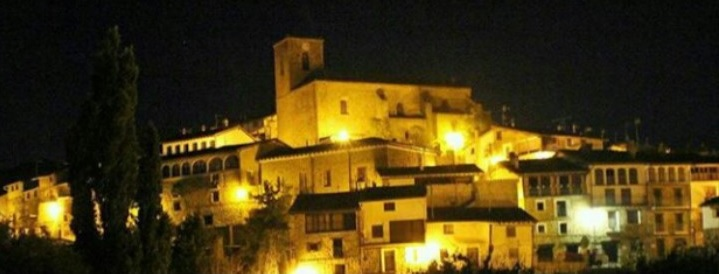
- Skyline of San Román de Cameros

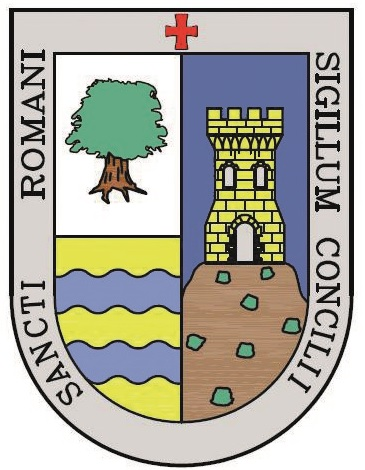
- Coat of arms

- Location within La Rioja, Spain Location within Spain
- Coordinates: 42°13′56″N 2°28′26″W
- Country: Spain
- Autonomous community: La Rioja
- Comarca: Cameros; Camero Viejo

Government
  - Mayor: Vicente Jiménez Anes (PSOE)

Area
  - Total: 47.50 km^{2} (18.34 sq mi)
- Elevation: 850 m (2,790 ft)

Population (2025-01-01)
  - Total: 127
- Postal code: 26133
- Website: www.sanromandecameros.org

San Román de Cameros is a village in the province and autonomous community of La Rioja, Spain. The municipality covers an area of 47.5 square kilometres (18.3 sq mi) and as of 2011 had a population of 169 people.

== Demographics ==
=== Population centres ===
- San Román de Cameros
- Avellaneda
- El Mirón
- Montalbo en Cameros
- Santa María en Cameros
- Vadillos
- Valdeosera
- Velilla

== Politics ==
List of mayors since the democratic elections of 1979
Term	Mayor	Political party
1979–1983	Pablo Tejada Íñiguez	UCD
1983–1987	Pablo Tejada Íñiguez	AP
1987–1991	Jesús Clemente García González and Luis Jiménez Calonge	PSOE
1991–1995	Alfredo Basilio Santolaya Lasanta	PSOE
1995–1999	José Luis Sáenz Laguna	PP
1999–2003	José Luis Sáenz Laguna	PP
2003–2007	José Luis Sáenz Laguna	PP
2007–2011	José Luis Sáenz Laguna	PP
2011–2015	Yolanda Fernández Anés	Independent
2015–2019	Vicente Jiménez Anes	PSOE
2019–2023	María Pilar Cristóbal Villoslada	PR+
2023–	n/d	n/d

== Notable people ==
- Tomás Fernández de Medrano
- Mariano de la Paz Graells
- Augusto Ibáñez Sacristán
