= Claudio Antón de Luzuriaga =

Spanish lawyer and politician

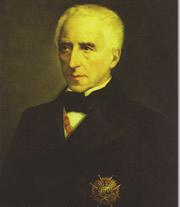
Luzuriaga wearing the Grand Cross and Ribbon of the Order of Isabella the Catholic

Claudio Antón de Luzuriaga (1810 in Soto en Cameros, La Rioja, Spain – 1874 in San Sebastián, Spain) was a Spanish lawyer and politician who served as Minister of State in 1854, in a cabinet headed by Baldomero Espartero, 1st Duke of la Victoria. Loyal to the Progressive Party and to Espartero, he declined the offer of the unionist Leopoldo O'Donnell, 1st Duke of Tetuan of becoming Minister of Justice in 1856.

Political offices
Preceded by Joaquín Francisco Pacheco	Minister of State; 29 November 1854 – 6 June 1855	Succeeded by The Marquis of Sierra Bullones
