= Laguna de Cameros =

- Municipality
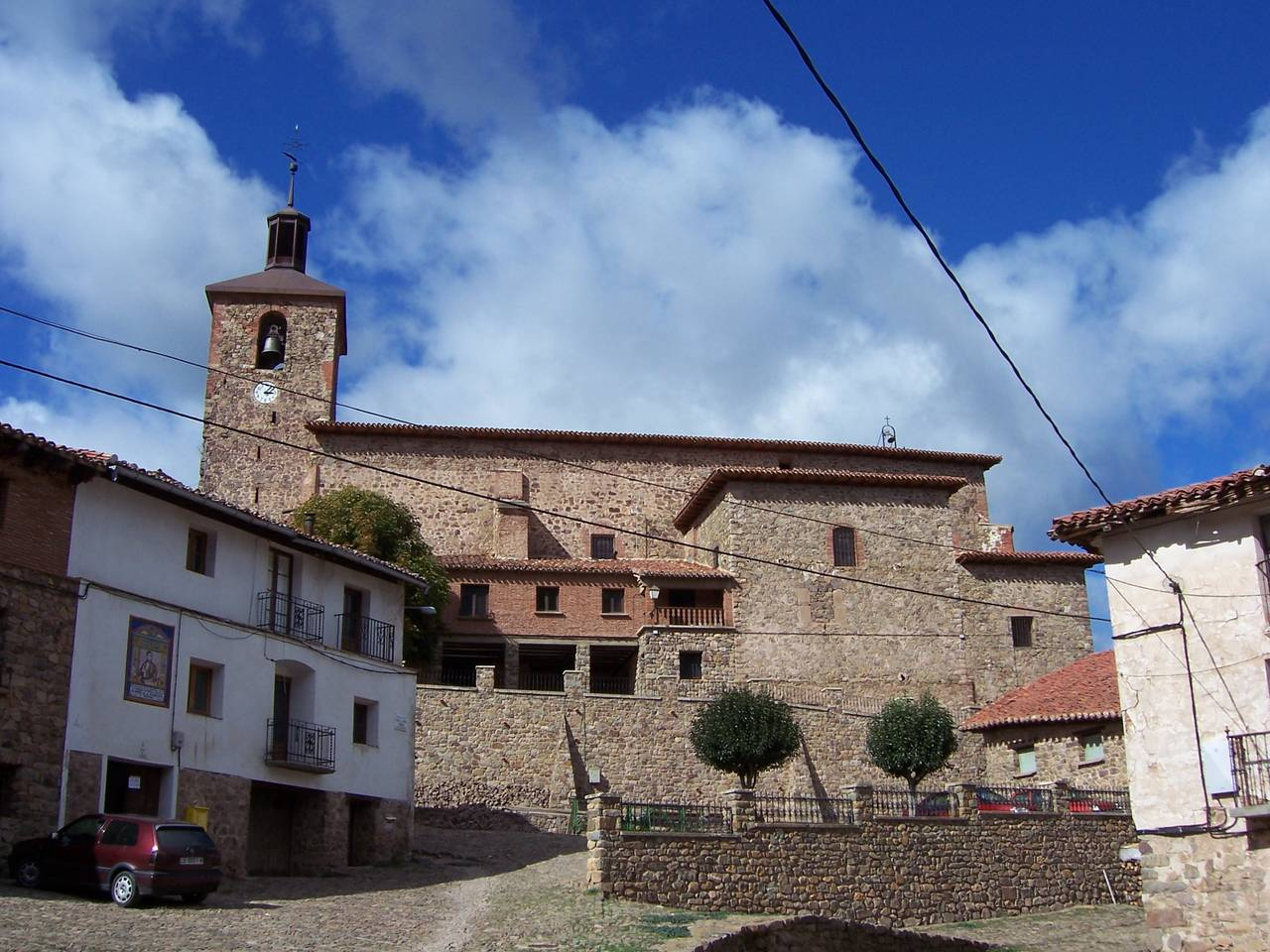
- Church of Laguna de Cameros

- Location within La Rioja, Spain Location within Spain
- Coordinates: 42°10′30″N 2°32′33″W
- Country: Spain
- Autonomous community: La Rioja
- Comarca: Cameros; Camero Viejo

Government
  - Mayor: Martín Íñiguez Fernández (PR+)

Area
  - Total: 41.60 km^{2} (16.06 sq mi)
- Elevation: 1,049 m (3,442 ft)

Population (2025-01-01)
  - Total: 109
- Demonym(s): laguchino, na
- Postal code: 26135

Laguna de Cameros is a village in the province and autonomous community of La Rioja, Spain. The municipality covers an area of 41.6 square kilometres (16.1 sq mi) and as of 2011 had a population of 143 people.
