= Terroba =

- Municipality
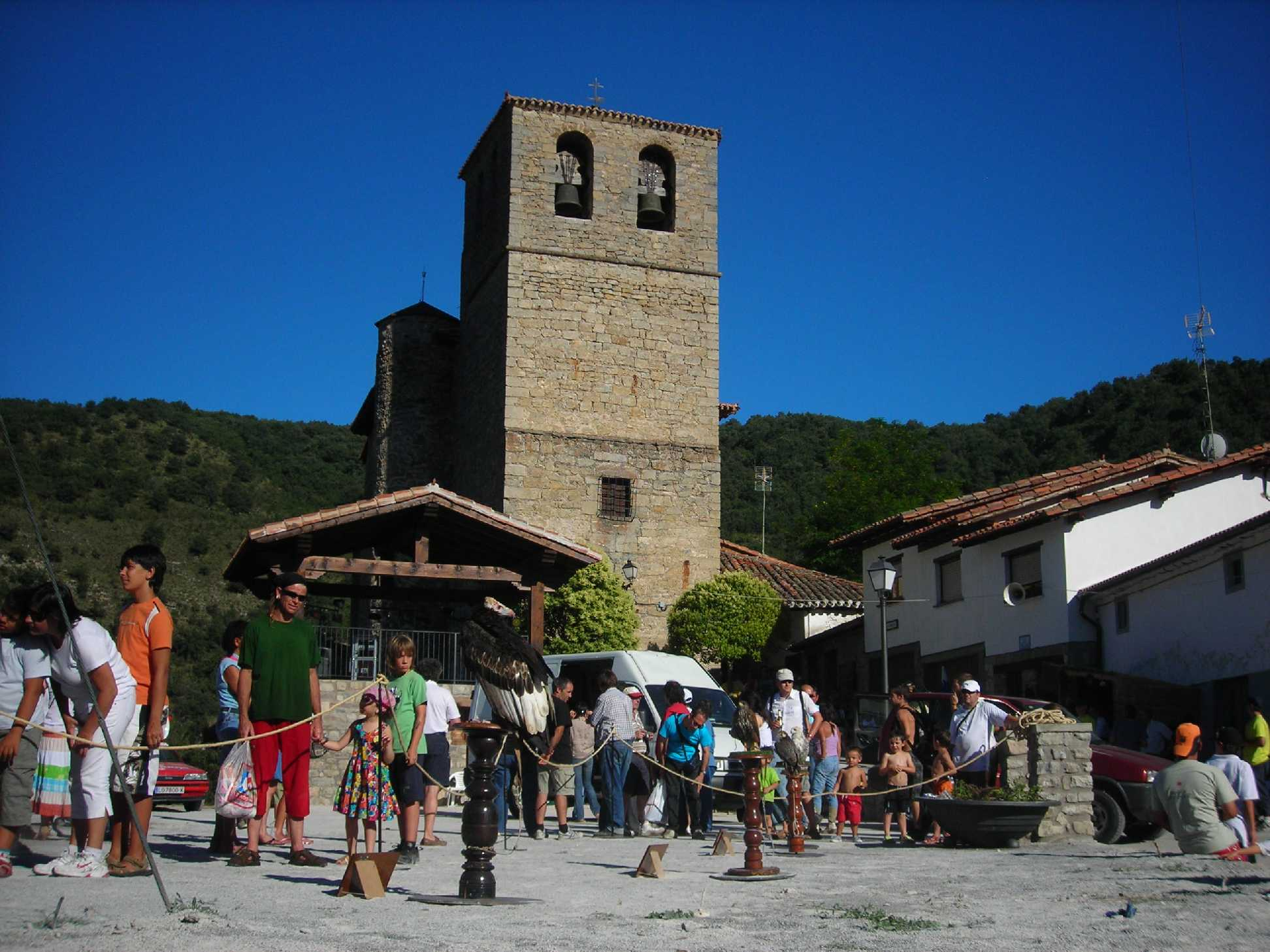
- Church of Iglesia de Santa Eulalia

- Location within La Rioja, Spain Location within Spain
- Coordinates: 42°15′30″N 2°26′38″W
- Country: Spain
- Autonomous community: La Rioja
- Comarca: Cameros; Camero Viejo

Government
  - Mayor: José Antonio Íñiguez Laorden (PR)

Area
  - Total: 8.84 km^{2} (3.41 sq mi)
- Elevation: 798 m (2,618 ft)

Population (2025-01-01)
  - Total: 31
- Demonym(s): terrobeño, ña
- Postal code: 26132

Terroba is a village in the province and autonomous community of La Rioja, Spain. The municipality covers an area of 8.84 square kilometres (3.41 sq mi) and as of 2011 had a population of 39 people.
