= Torre en Cameros =

- Municipality
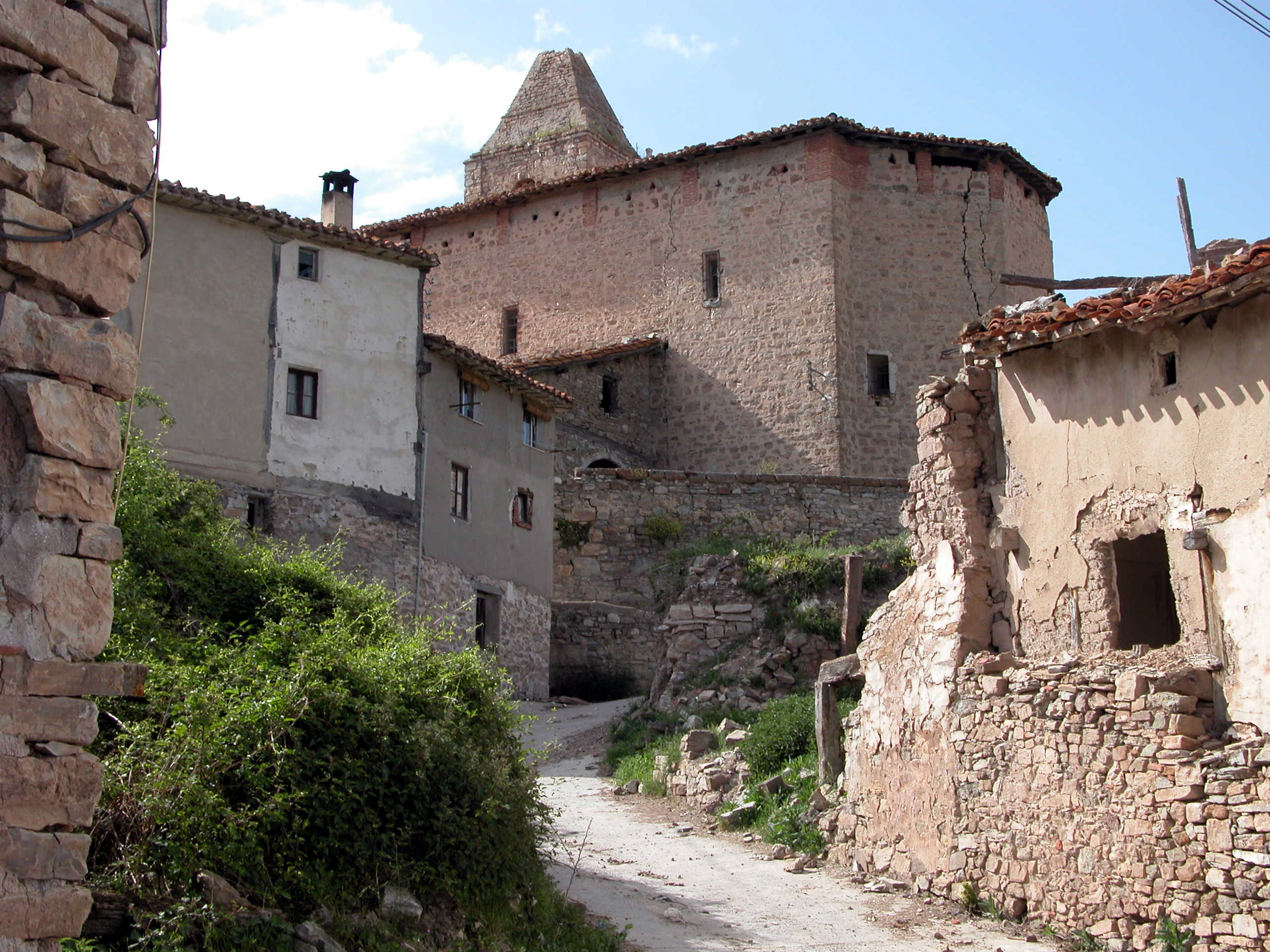
- Skyline of Torre en Cameros

- Location within La Rioja, Spain Location within Spain
- Coordinates: 42°14′29″N 2°31′05″W
- Country: Spain
- Autonomous community: La Rioja
- Comarca: Cameros; Camero Viejo

Government
  - Mayor: Óscar Sáenz Sáenz (PSOE)

Area
  - Total: 11.64 km^{2} (4.49 sq mi)
- Elevation: 1,153 m (3,783 ft)

Population (2025-01-01)
  - Total: 8
- Demonym(s): torreño, ña
- Postal code: 26134

Torre en Cameros is a village in the province and autonomous community of La Rioja, Spain. The municipality covers an area of 11.64 square kilometres (4.49 sq mi) and as of 2011 had a population of 12 people.

== Politics ==
List of mayors since the democratic elections of 1979
Term	Mayor	Political party
1979–1983	Simón Sáenz Jiménez	Grouping of electors
1983–1987	Simón Sáenz Jiménez	PSOE
1987–1991	Simón Sáenz Jiménez	PSOE
1991–1995	Simón Sáenz Jiménez	PSOE
1995–1999	Simón Sáenz Jiménez	PSOE
1999–2003	Simón Sáenz Jiménez	PSOE
2003–2007	Óscar Sáenz Sáenz	PSOE
2007–2011	Óscar Sáenz Sáenz	PSOE
2011–2015	Óscar Sáenz Sáenz	PSOE
2015–2019	Óscar Sáenz Sáenz	PSOE
2019–2023	n/d	n/d
2023–	n/d	n/d
