= Velilla, La Rioja =

Velilla
- Populated place
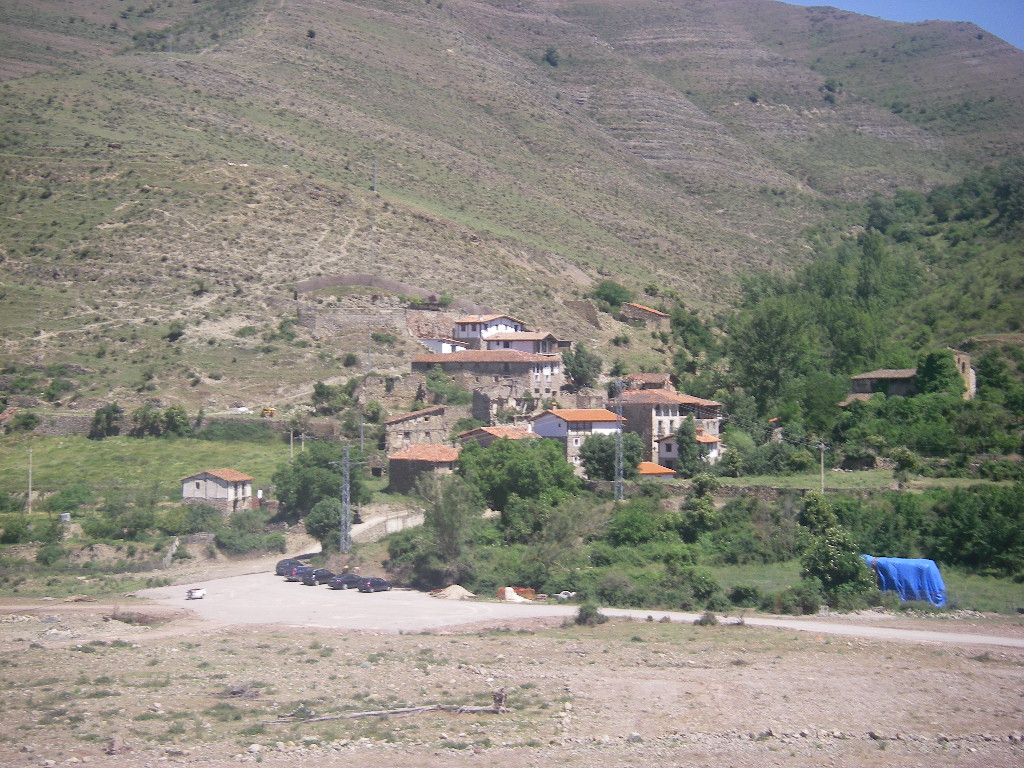

- Location within La Rioja, Spain Location within Spain
- Country: Spain
- Autonomous community: La Rioja
- Comarca: Camero Viejo

Population
  - Total: 4
- Postal code: 26133

Velilla is a village in the municipality of San Román de Cameros, in the province and autonomous community of La Rioja, Spain. As of 2018 had a population of 4 people.
