= Rabanera =

- Municipality
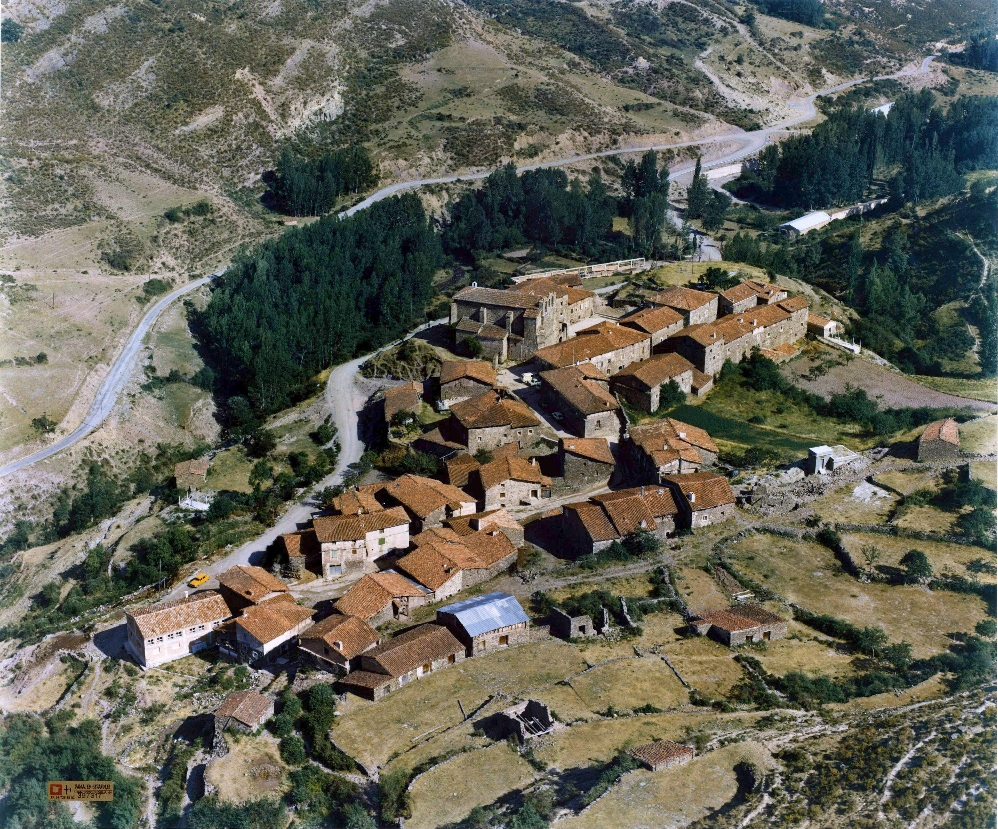
- Airview of Rabanera

- Location within La Rioja, Spain Location within Spain
- Coordinates: 42°11′22″N 2°29′12″W
- Country: Spain
- Autonomous community: La Rioja
- Comarca: Camero Viejo

Government
  - Mayor: Andrés Escolar López (PP)

Area
  - Total: 13.81 km^{2} (5.33 sq mi)
- Elevation: 974 m (3,196 ft)

Population (2025-01-01)
  - Total: 29
- Postal code: 26133

Rabanera is a village in the province and autonomous community of La Rioja, Spain. The municipality covers an area of 13.81 square kilometres (5.33 sq mi) and as of 2011 had a population of 68 people.

== Politics ==
List of mayors since the democratic elections of 1979
Term	Mayor	Political party
1979–1983	Laureano Escolar Escolar	UCD
1983–1987	Laureano Escolar Escolar	AP
1987–1991	Laureano Escolar Escolar	Independent
1991–1995	Laureano Escolar Escolar	PP
1995–1999	Laureano Escolar Escolar	Independent
1999–2003	Laureano Escolar Escolar	PSOE
2003–2007	Laureano Escolar Escolar	PP
2007–2011	Laureano Escolar Escolar	PP
2011–2015	Andrés Escolar López	PP
2015–2019	Andrés Escolar López	PP
2019–2023	n/d	n/d
2023–	n/d	n/d

== Literature ==
- Ernesto Reiner. Viaje por el Camero Viejo. 1984. ISBN 84-398-2054-2
- Various Authors in the '90s. 1991. ISBN 84-87209-34-3
