= Hornillos de Cameros =

- Municipality
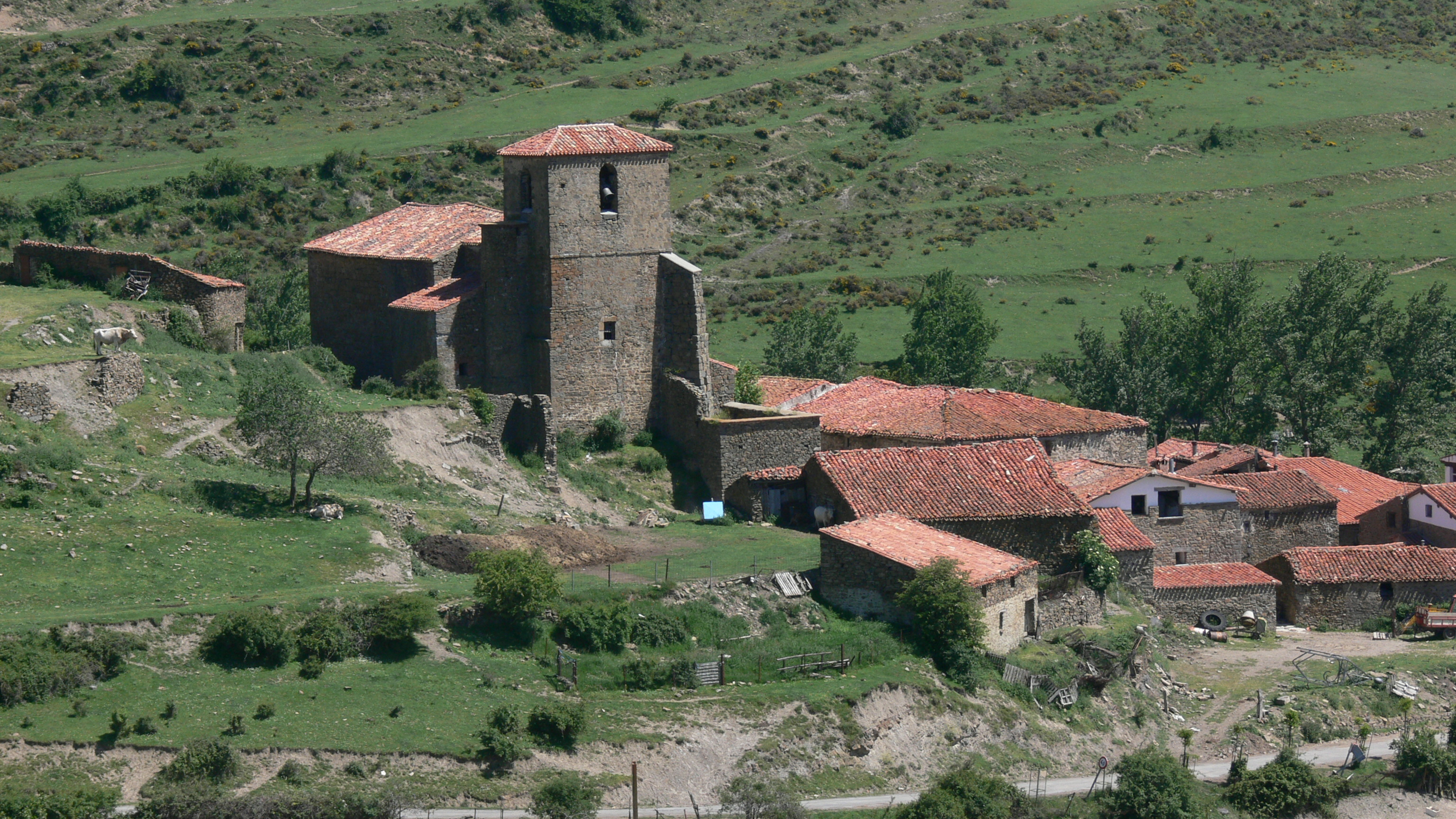
- Skyline of Hornillos de Cameros

- Location within La Rioja, Spain Location within Spain
- Coordinates: 42°12′36″N 2°25′10″W
- Country: Spain
- Autonomous community: La Rioja
- Comarca: Camero Viejo

Government
  - Mayor: Juan José Santos Martínez (PP)

Area
  - Total: 11.90 km^{2} (4.59 sq mi)
- Elevation: 1,145 m (3,757 ft)

Population (2025-01-01)
  - Total: 14
- Postal code: 26133

Hornillos de Cameros is a village in the province and autonomous community of La Rioja, Spain. The municipality covers an area of 11.9 square kilometres (4.6 sq mi) and as of 2011 had a population of 15 people.
