= Leza de Río Leza =

- Municipality
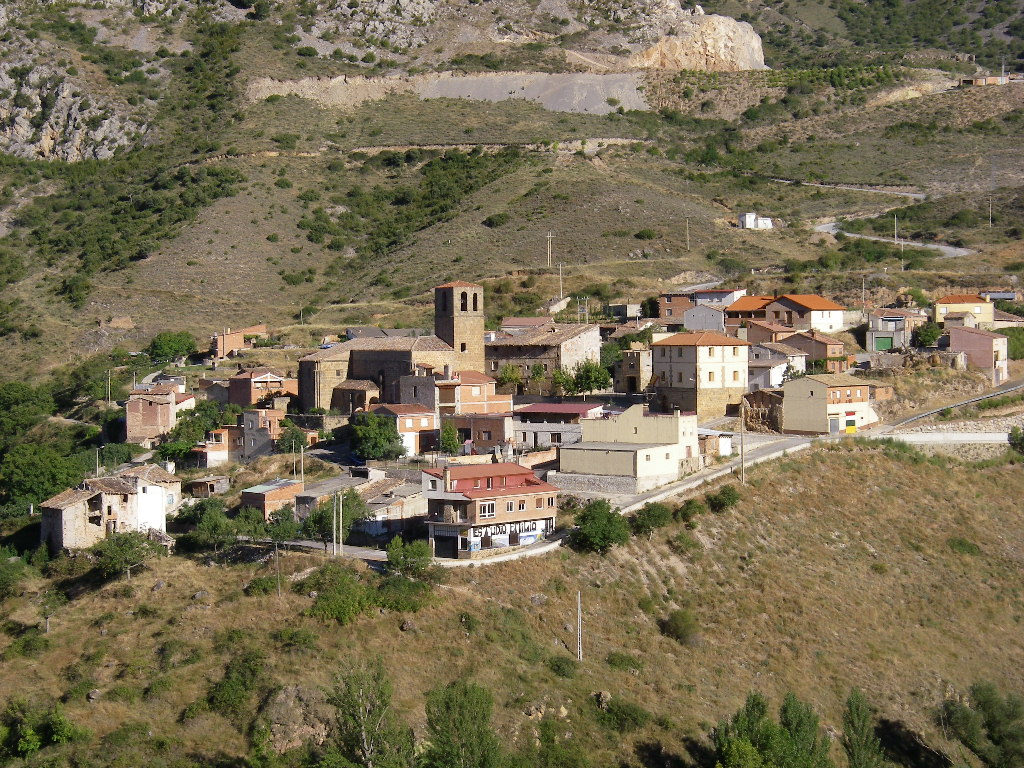
- Skyline of Leza de Río Leza

- Location within La Rioja, Spain Location within Spain
- Coordinates: 42°19′45″N 2°24′21″W
- Country: Spain
- Autonomous community: La Rioja
- Comarca: Camero Viejo

Government
  - Mayor: Juan Carlos Duarte Díez (PP)

Area
  - Total: 11.12 km^{2} (4.29 sq mi)
- Elevation: 571 m (1,873 ft)

Population (2025-01-01)
  - Total: 40
- Postal code: 26132

Leza de Río Leza is a village in the province and autonomous community of La Rioja, Spain. The municipality covers an area of 11.12 square kilometres (4.29 sq mi) and as of 2011 had a population of 49 people.
