= Soto en Cameros =

- Municipality
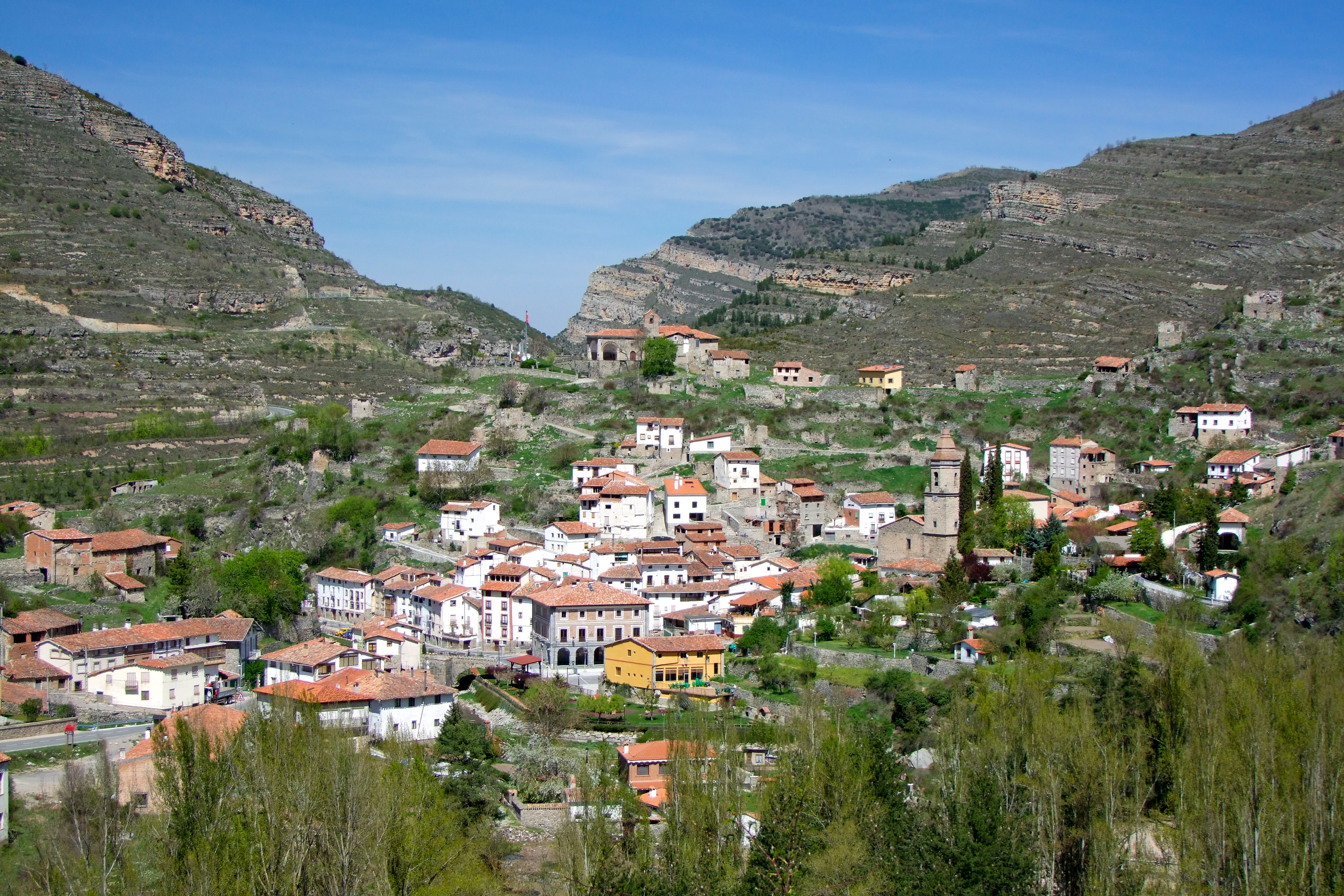
- Skyline of Soto en Cameros

- Location within La Rioja, Spain Location within Spain
- Coordinates: 42°17′10″N 2°25′30″W
- Country: Spain
- Autonomous community: La Rioja
- Comarca: Cameros; Camero Viejo

Government
  - Mayor: Pedro Elías Cristóbal Hernáez (PP)

Area
  - Total: 49.05 km^{2} (18.94 sq mi)
- Elevation: 719 m (2,359 ft)

Population (2025-01-01)
  - Total: 82
- Demonym(s): soteño, ña
- Postal code: 26132
- Website: Soto en Cameros

Soto en Cameros is a village in the province and autonomous community of La Rioja, Spain. The municipality covers an area of 49.05 square kilometres (18.94 sq mi) and as of 2011 had a population of 163 people. The city has an elevation of 2,510 feet.

A culinary stand out in Soto en Cameros are the marzipans, created using only almonds and sugar.

== Notable people ==
- Claudio Antón de Luzuriaga, was a Spanish lawyer and politician who served as Minister of State in 1854, in a cabinet headed by Baldomero Espartero, 1st Duke of la Victoria.
