= Muro en Cameros =

- Municipality
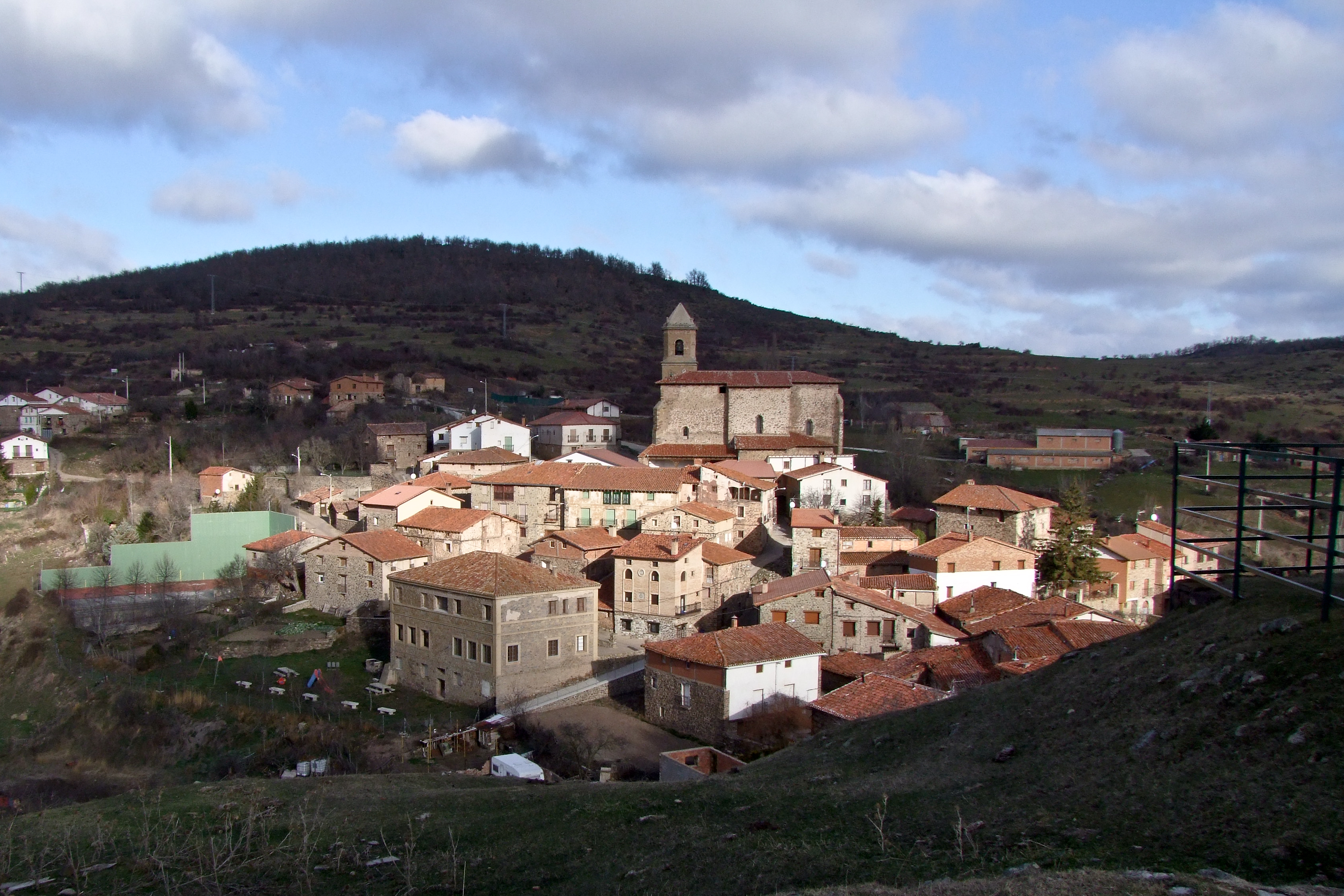
- Skyline of Muro en Cameros

- Location within La Rioja, Spain Location within Spain
- Coordinates: 42°14′N 2°32′W
- Country: Spain
- Autonomous community: La Rioja
- Comarca: Cameros; Camero Viejo

Government
  - Mayor: Luis Tejada Tejada (PP)

Area
  - Total: 15.99 km^{2} (6.17 sq mi)
- Elevation: 1,104 m (3,622 ft)

Population (2025-01-01)
  - Total: 40
- Postal code: 26134
- Website: www.muroencameros.org

Muro en Cameros is a village in the province and autonomous community of La Rioja, Spain. The municipality covers an area of 15.99 square kilometres (6.17 sq mi) and as of 2011 had a population of 48 people.
