= Camero Viejo =

Viejo
- Comarca
- Interactive map of Viejo
- Coordinates: 42.175705°N 2.672564°W
- Country: Spain

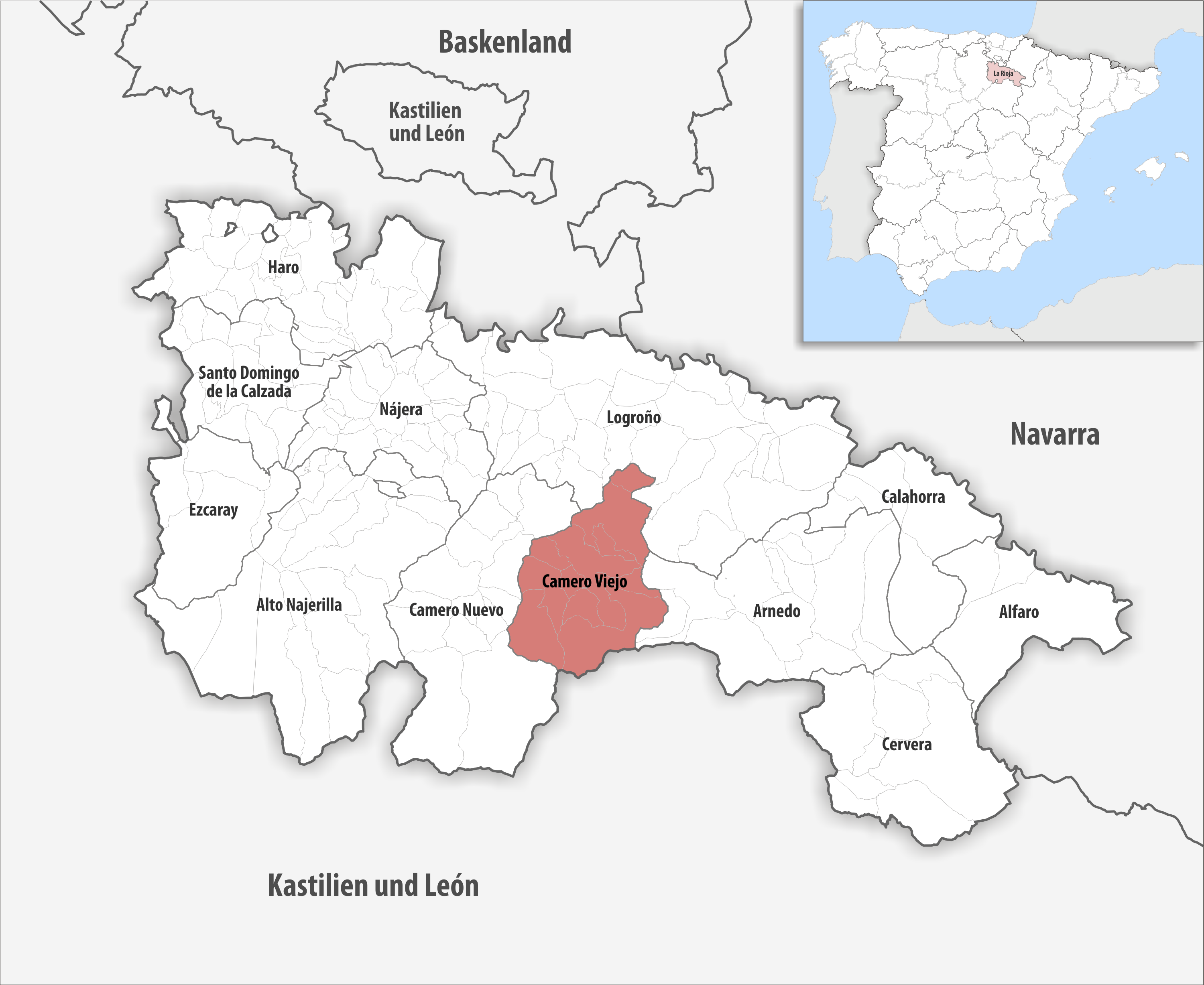
Camero Viejo region

Viejo is a comarca in La Rioja province in Spain.
