= Mansilla de la Sierra =

- Municipality
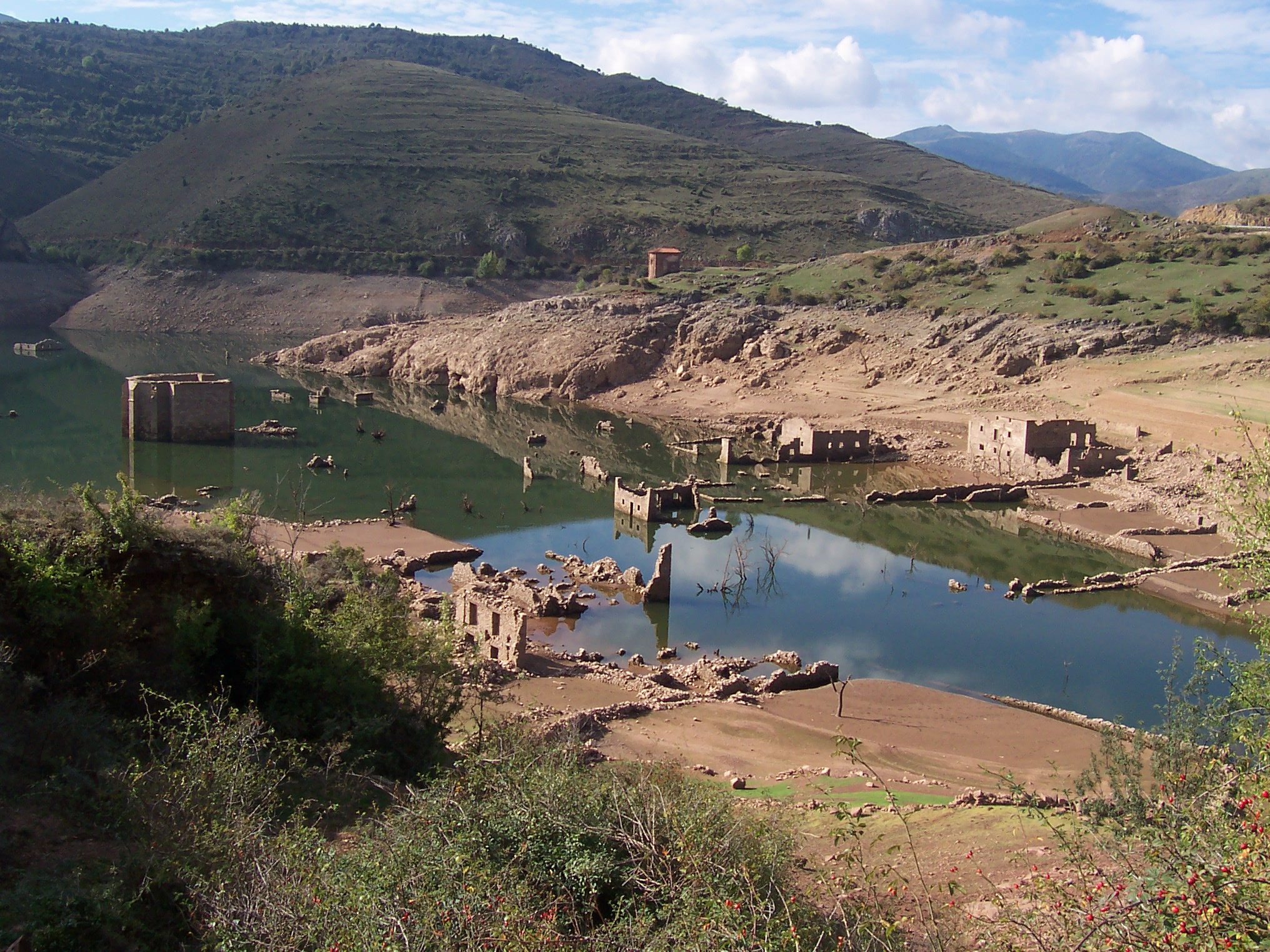
- Ruins of the old town

- Location within La Rioja, Spain Location within Spain
- Coordinates: 42°09′12″N 2°56′42″W
- Country: Spain
- Autonomous community: La Rioja
- Comarca: Anguiano

Government
  - Mayor: José Manuel Ballesteros Pablo (PSOE)

Area
  - Total: 84.76 km^{2} (32.73 sq mi)
- Elevation: 947 m (3,107 ft)

Population (2025-01-01)
  - Total: 57
- Postal code: 26329
- Website: www.mansilla.org

Mansilla de la Sierra is a village in the province and autonomous community of La Rioja, Spain. The municipality covers an area of 84.76 square kilometres (32.73 sq mi) and in 2011 had a population of 70.

The village was the model for the town described by Ana María Matute in her collection of stories Historias de la Artámila.

== Demographics ==
=== Population centres ===
- Mansilla de la Sierra
- Tabladas
