= Tabladas =

- Populated place
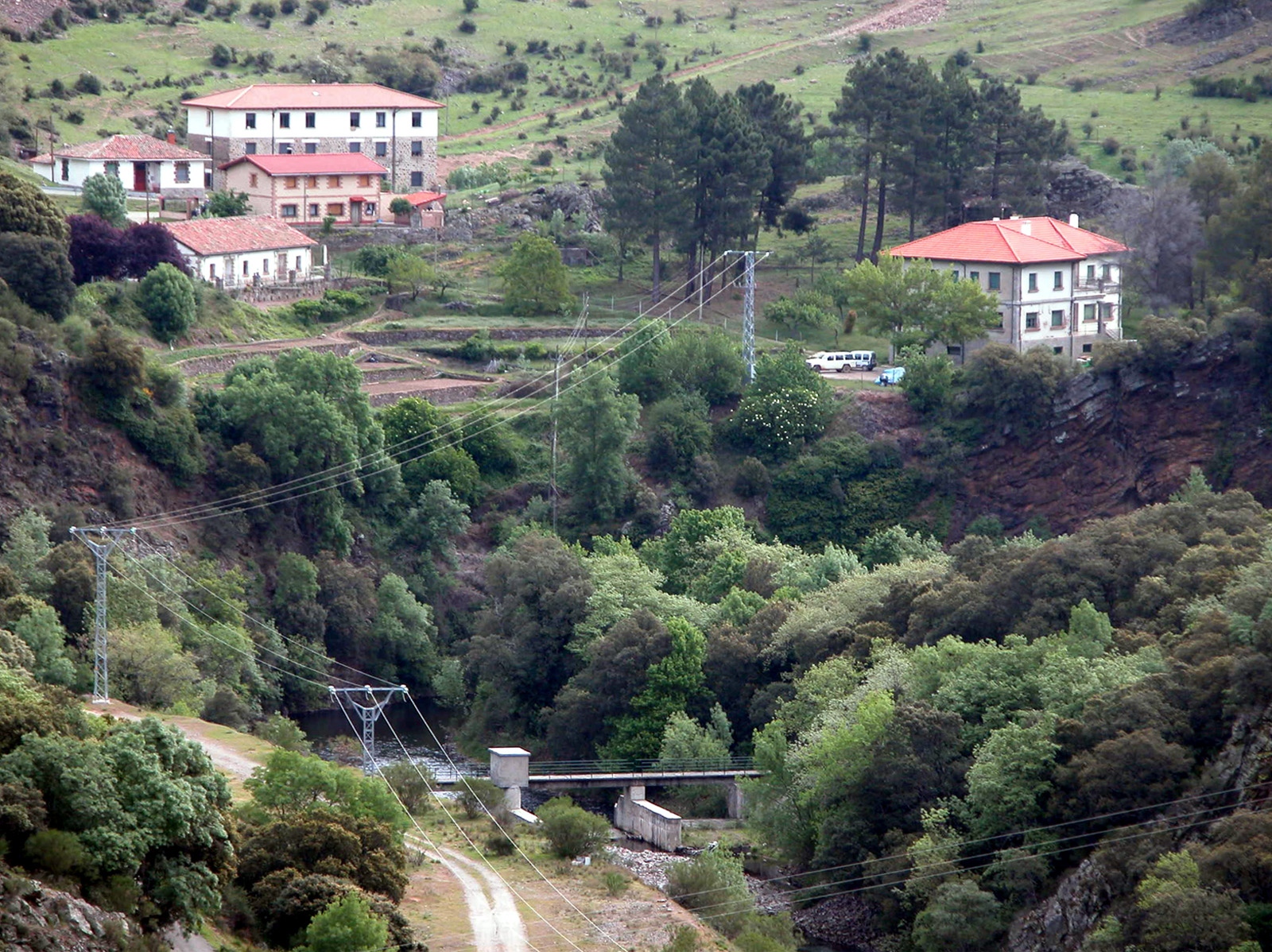
- View of Tabladas.

- Location within La Rioja, Spain Location within Spain
- Country: Spain
- Autonomous community: La Rioja
- Comarca: Logroño

Population
  - Total: 9
- Postal code: 26329

Tabladas is a village in the municipality of Mansilla de la Sierra, in the province and autonomous community of La Rioja, Spain. As of 2018 had a population of 9 people.
