= Alberto Bretón =

Spanish politician (born 1964)

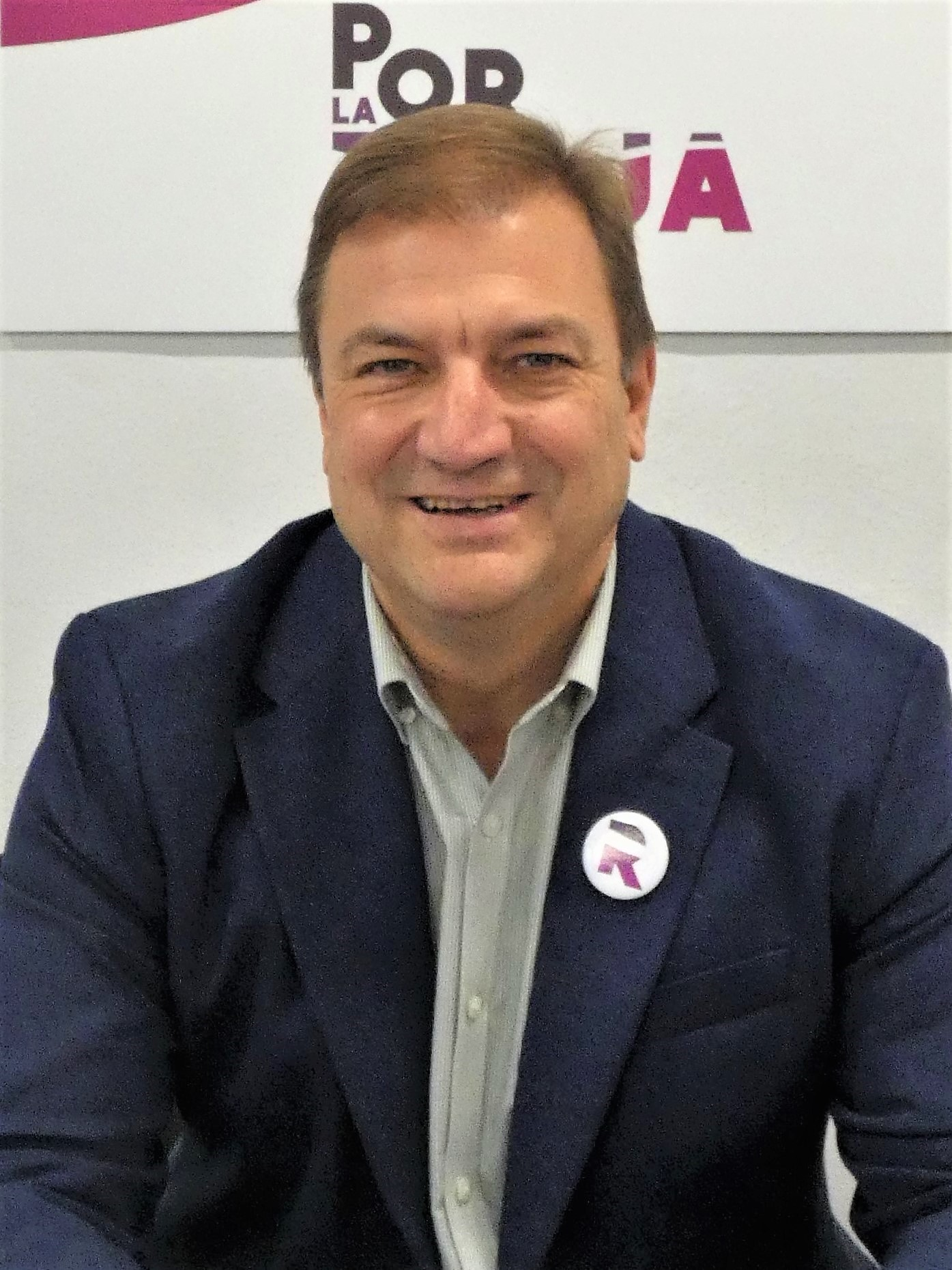

Alberto Bretón Rodríguez (born 12 September 1964) is a Spanish politician. As a member of the People's Party (PP), he served in the Parliament of La Rioja (2003; 2019–2023) and the Senate of Spain (2011). He was also a minister in the Government of La Rioja from 2003 to 2007, and again in 2019, as well as the government delegate to La Rioja from 2011 to 2018.

In 2023, he left the PP and founded Por La Rioja (PLRi). In the year's local elections, his party ranked third in La Rioja for mayors and councillors, but his run for mayor of Logroño resulted in no seats, nor did his party win a seat in the regional parliament. He left the party leadership later that year, while remaining a member.

== Biography ==
=== People's Party ===
Bretón was born in Logroño in La Rioja, and graduated in law from the University of Zaragoza. He joined the People's Party (PP) in 2002.

In the 2003 Riojan regional election, Bretón was elected to the Parliament of La Rioja, resigning his seat soon after to serve as minister of public administration in the government of Pedro Sanz until 2007. In Sanz's next government following re-election in 2007, he named Conrado Escobar in the position instead.

In July 2011, Bretón was named director general of judicial services, resigning two months later to lead the PP list for the Senate of Spain in the La Rioja constituency during the general election. He was elected, and resigned weeks later when he was named government delegate to La Rioja by the prime minister of Spain, Mariano Rajoy.

Bretón returned to the government of La Rioja in April 2019, as Minister of Social Policy, Family, Equality and Justice in the government of José Ignacio Ceniceros. He replaced Escobar, who was running for mayor of Logroño. He was named fifth on Ceniceros's PP list for the 2019 Riojan regional election. He was elected, while his party lost control of the government for the first time in 24 years.

=== Por La Rioja ===
Bretón quit his seat in the Parliament of La Rioja, and PP membership, in a dispute with Gonzalo Capellán being appointed the party's lead candidate for the 2023 Riojan regional election by the party'a national leadership. He announced the party Por La Rioja (PLRi) on 16 February 2023, and was joined by former members of the Riojan Party (PR+), who had left due to their party running a joint list with the Empty Spain platform. He was unanimously voted as secretary general of the new party.

Por La Rioja took five mayors' offices and 52 councillors in the 2023 Spanish local elections, ranking third in La Rioja behind the PP and the Spanish Socialist Workers' Party (PSOE). The party did not win a seat in the Parliament, nor in the city council of Logroño, where Bretón was running for mayor. He resigned as secretary general on 18 October while remaining a member; regional list leader Sonsoles Soriano replaced him.
