= Government of Gonzalo Capellán =

Government of the Spanish autonomous community of La Rioja

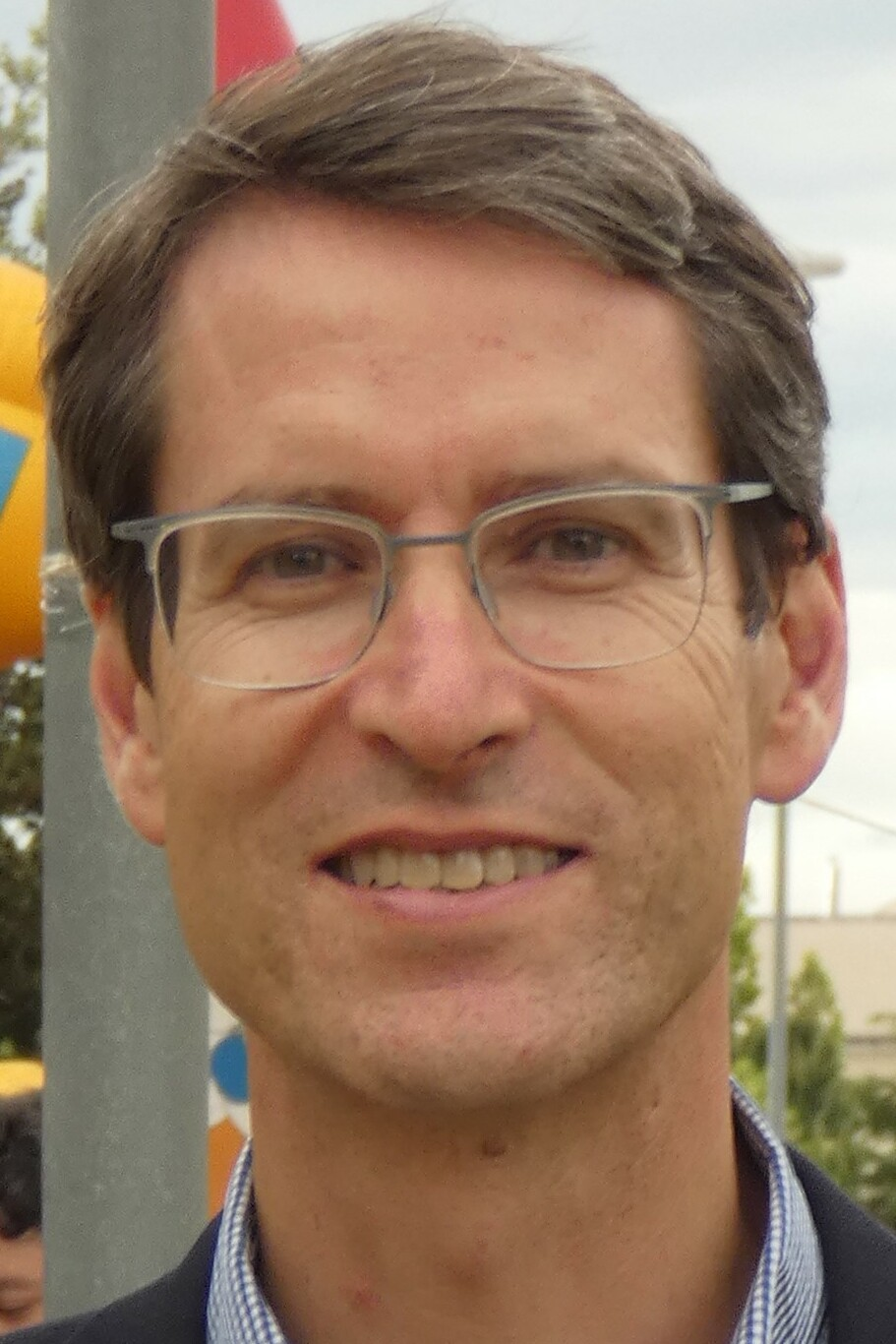

History
- Election: 2023 Riojan regional election

The Capellán Government (Spanish: Gobierno Capellán) is the government of the Spanish autonomous community of La Rioja since 2 July 2023.

It is led by the new conservative President of La Rioja Gonzalo Capellán, whose People's Party won an absolute majority in the 2023 Riojan regional election. It succeeded the minority coalition government of socialist Concha Andreu.

== History ==
This government is led by the new liberal-conservative president, Gonzalo Capellán. It is formed and supported by the People's Party (PP). Alone, he has 17 members out of 33, or 51.5% of the seats in the Parliament of La Rioja.

It was formed following the autonomous elections of 28 May 2023.

It therefore succeeds the Andreu government, made up of a minority coalition between the Spanish Socialist Workers' Party (PSOE) and Podemos, with the support without participation of United Left (IU).

=== Formation ===
In the autonomic elections, the Popular Party won the absolute majority of seats in the Parliament of La Rioja, having collected approximately 45% of the votes cast and almost 75,000 votes. Following the recount of the expatriates' vote, the distribution of seats, and therefore the possibility of the PP to govern alone, was confirmed. Gonzalo Capellán revealed on 9 June that the organization and composition of its executive had been decided.

On 23 June 2023, the new president of the Parliament, Marta Fernández Cornago, announced that she would be proposing the candidacy of Gonzalo Capellán for president of the autonomous community. She convened the investiture debate for the 27 and 28 June. Having delivered his general policy speech on 27 June, on 28 June he received the confidence of Parliament by 17 votes for and 16 votes against: the Popular Party voting in favour, the Socialist Party, Vox and Unidas Podemos (Podemos-IU) voting against.

The composition of the new executive is revealed on 1 July. The councillors took the oath and took office the next day.

== Composition ==
Office	Name	Party
President	Gonzalo Capellán de Miguel	PP
Finance, Public Governance and the Digital Society	Alfonso Domínguez Simón	PP
Health and Social Policies	María Purificación Martín Díez de Baldeón	PP
Education and Employment	Alberto Galiana García	PP
Culture, Tourism, Sports and Youth	José Luis Pérez Pastor	PP
Economy, Innovation, Businesses and Self-Employed Workers	María Belinda León Fernández	Ind.
Agriculture, Livestock, Rural World and Environment	Noemí Manzanos Martínez	PP
Local Policy, Infrastructure and the Fight against Depopulation	Daniel Osés Ramírez	PP
