= Julio Revuelta =

Spanish politician (1959–2026)

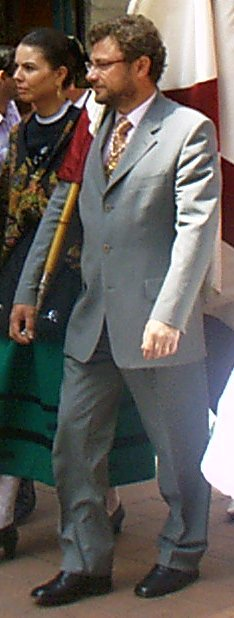
- Revuelta in 2005

Mayor of Logroño
- In office 11 October 2000 – 16 June 2007
- Preceded by: José Luis Bermejo
- Succeeded by: Tomás Santos

Personal details
- Born: 7 March 1959 Burgos, Spain
- Died: 1 July 2026 (aged 67)
- Party: Riojan Party (from 2012)
- Other political affiliations: Citizens of Logroño (2011–2012); People's Party (until 2011)
- Education: University of Navarra
- Profession: Architect

Julio Revuelta Altuna (7 March 1959 – 1 July 2026) was a Spanish architect and politician. As a member of the People's Party (PP), he was a city councillor in Logroño from 1991 to 2007, and the mayor from 2000 to 2007. During his time in office, he oversaw several architectural projects, and in 2024 he was awarded the Gold Medal of the City of Logroño.

Revuelta quit the PP and founded his own party ahead of the 2011 election, and his party was then absorbed into the Riojan Party (PR+). He was that party's lead candidate in the 2019 Riojan regional election, in which they did not win any seats.

== Early life ==
Revuelta was born in Burgos in Castile and León, on 7 March 1959. He graduated in architecture from the University of Navarre. He began working as a civil servant for the Government of La Rioja.

== Political career ==
In 1991, Revuelta was elected to the city council in Logroño, representing the People's Party (PP). From 1994, he led them in the chamber, and from 1995 to 2000 he was deputy mayor to José Luis Bermejo, and in charge of city planning. Bermejo left for a post in the Cortes Generales, and Revuelta succeeded him as mayor.

Revuelta's local cabinet included two future mayors of Logroño, Cuca Gamarra and Conrado Escobar. Works from his time as mayor included the Gran Vía Juan Carlos I thoroughfare. He worked with architect Rafael Moneo on two new sectors of the city, and his official painting portrayed him next to the Sagasta Bridge, which was constructed under his mandate. Parks and green spaces near the Ebro river were expanded. He fell out with the regional government, of the same party, due to disagreements about an urban development.

Revuelta's party won the plurality of seats in the 2007 election, but the Spanish Socialist Workers' Party (PSOE) and the Riojan Party (PR+) formed a pact and installed Tomás Santos as mayor; Revuelta resigned his council seat as a result.

In March 2011, in the run-up to local elections, Revuelta left the PP and founded Ciudadanos de Logroño. In his leaving letter, he accused the president of the People's Party of La Rioja and President of La Rioja, Pedro Sanz, of not attempting a pact that would have kept the party in control of the regional capital in 2007.

Ciudadanos de Logroño merged into PR+ in January 2012. In June 2017, former Ciudadanos de Logroño member Rubén Antoñanzas was elected president of PR+, and Revuelta was named secretary general. In the 2019 Riojan regional election, Antoñanzas declined to run as PR+'s list leader, instead opting to do so for the local election in Logroño, so Revuelta led the list at regional level. The party ran a joint list with Union, Progress and Democracy (UPyD). The list did not win a seat in the Parliament of La Rioja.

In November 2024, Revuelta was one of the previous four mayors to be awarded the Gold Medal of the City of Logroño.

== Personal life and death ==
Revuelta was married to Amaya, also an architect. They had two daughters.

After being diagnosed with cancer, Revuelta documented his experiences in regional newspaper La Rioja and on Televisión Rioja. He died on 1 July 2026, at the age of 67, after years of treatment for two successive cancers. Logroño city council declared three days of mourning. His funeral was held on 3 July at the Iglesia de Santiago el Real in the city.
