= César Luena =

Spanish politician (born 1980)

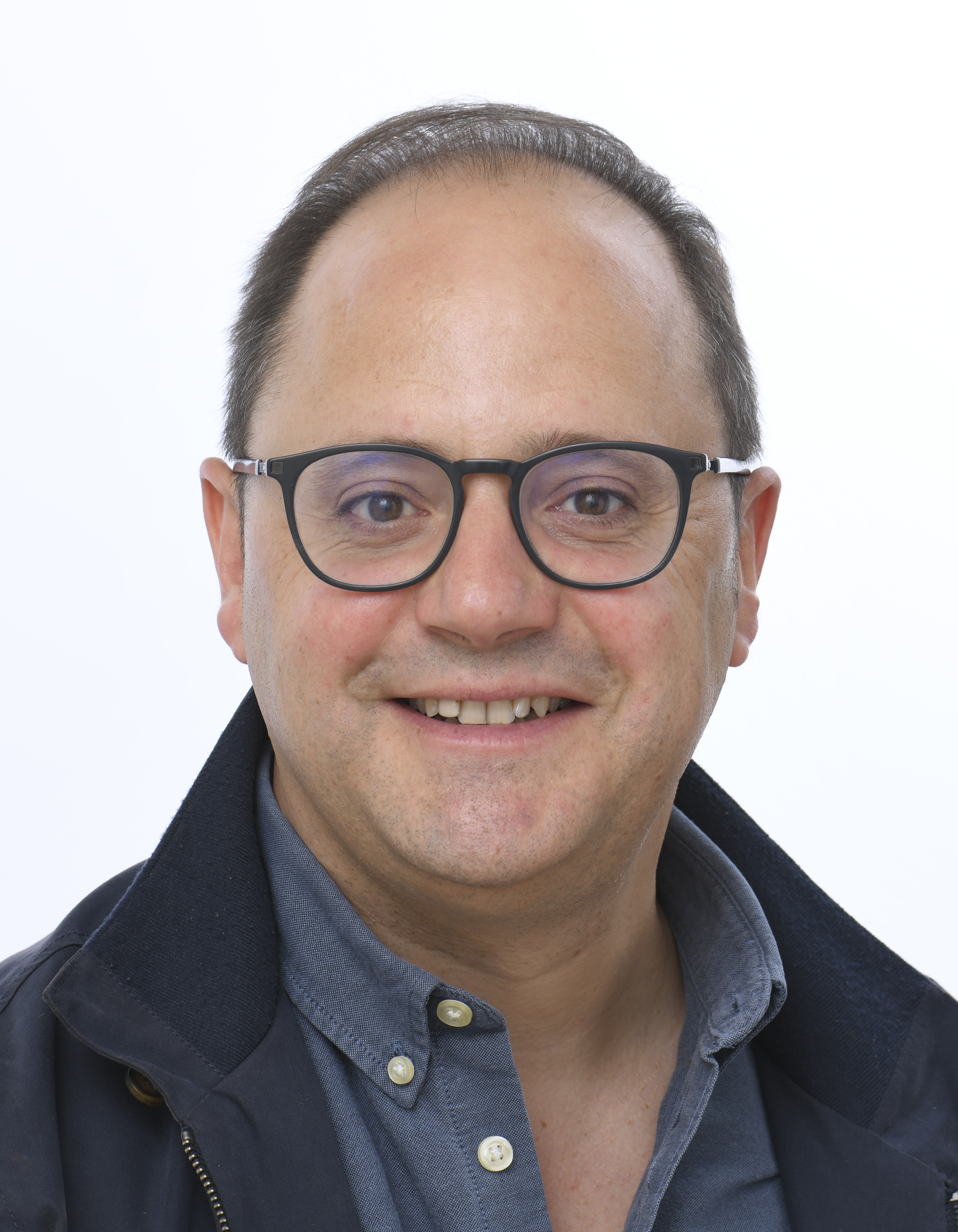

Member of the European Parliament
- Incumbent
- Assumed office 2 July 2019
- Constituency: Spain

Member of the Congress of Deputies
- In office 2008–2019
- Constituency: La Rioja

Member of the Parliament of La Rioja
- In office 2007–2008

Personal details
- Born: 29 October 1980 (age 45) Bobadilla, Spain
- Party: Spanish Socialist Workers' Party

César Luena López (pronounced [ˈθe.saɾ ˈlwe.na]; born 29 October 1980) is a Spanish politician of the Spanish Socialist Workers' Party (PSOE) who has been serving as Member of the European Parliament since 2019. He was a member of the 9th, 10th, 11th and 12th terms of the Congress of Deputies in representation of La Rioja.

== Early life and education ==
Luena was Born in the small town of Bobadilla, La Rioja, on 29 October 1980. He grew up in a working-class family, his father being a miller and his mother a housewife. After attending a rural school in his hometown, Luena undertook his high school education in Nájera. He earned a licentiate degree in Humanities at the University of La Rioja (UR) in 2003 and obtained his PhD in History from the same university in 2005. He became an Associate Professor in the Department of Social Sciences at the Carlos III University of Madrid in 2019.

== Political career ==
=== Early beginnings ===
Luena joined the Socialist Youth at age 17 and the Spanish Socialist Workers' Party (PSOE) when he was 20 years old.

After becoming Secretary General of the Socialist Youth of La Rioja region in 2002, Luena served as municipal councillor in Bobadilla from 2003 to 2007. Also active in college organizations at the national level, he was a member of the Federation of Progressive Students of Spain (2004–2007) and the Consejo Escolar del Estado (2006–2007).

Luena ran 13th in the PSOE list for the 2007 regional election in La Rioja and, elected, he served as member of the regional legislature from 2007 to 2008. He was designated as head of the PSOE list in La Rioja to the Lower House for the 2008 general election, becoming a member of the 9th term of the Congress of Deputies. He renovated his seat for the 10th, 11th and 12th terms.

In 2012, Luena was elected as the Secretary General of the regional branch of PSOE, the PSOE La Rioja. In March 2014, he earned a PhD at the UR reading a dissertation titled Antonio Larrea: el alma del Rioja ("Antonio Larrea: The Soul of La Rioja"), supervised by José Luis Gómez Urdáñez.

=== Career in national politics ===
After Pedro Sánchez became the PSOE leader in July 2014, the latter chose Luena as Secretary of Organization of the party. A member of Sánchez's inner circle during the later's first spell as party leader, he left the post after the political "defenestration" of Sánchez during the 2016 PSOE crisis in the Autumn of 2016 and the ensuing installation of an interim board; he was one of the sanchistas who distanced from their former leader, showing indifference towards Sánchez during the latter's intervention at the second investiture session of Mariano Rajoy as Prime Minister in October 2016.

Luena sided with Patxi López in regard of the May 2017 PSOE leadership election. He found himself on the losing side of the primary election after the unexpected win of Sánchez over Susana Díaz and López, and soon after, in July 2017, he was replaced as leader of the PSOE La Rioja by Francisco Ocón, thus his political clout was reduced to his deputy seat obtained at the June 2016 general election.

=== Member of the European Parliament, 2019–present ===
Sánchez found a place for his former right-hand in the 11th slot of the PSOE electoral list for the May 2019 European Parliament election in Spain with Luena being finally included in the 10th place of the list after Sami Naïr (prospective #3) was barred from contesting the election by the Junta Electoral Central. Elected as MEP,

In parliament, Luena is part of the Progressive Alliance of Socialists and Democrats (S&D) political group. He joined the Committee on the Environment, Public Health and Food Safety (ENVI). In this capacity, he was the parliament's rapporteur on the EU's strategy for biodiversity (2021), calling for legally binding measures to halve the use of chemical pesticides, cut fertilizer use by 20% and expand protected areas of land and sea by 2030, and nature restoration regulation (2023).

In addition to his committee assignments, Luena also became a member of the parliament's delegation for relations with the Korean Peninsula (DKOR), assuming a vice-chair role. He is also a member of the Spinelli Group.

Party political offices
Preceded by Francisco Martínez-Aldama	Secretary General of the PSOE La Rioja; 2012–2017	Succeeded by Francisco Ocón
Preceded by Óscar López Águeda	Secretary of Organization of the Spanish Socialist Workers' Party; 2014–2016	Succeeded by José Luis Ábalos
