= 1999 Riojan regional election =

Election in the Spanish region of La Rioja

- 13 June 1999

All 33 seats in the Parliament of La Rioja 17 seats needed for a majority
- Opinion polls
- Registered: 229,569 ▲5.1%
- Turnout: 157,623 (68.7%) ▼7.5 pp
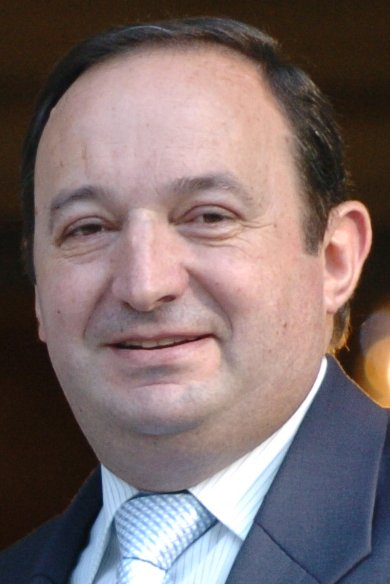

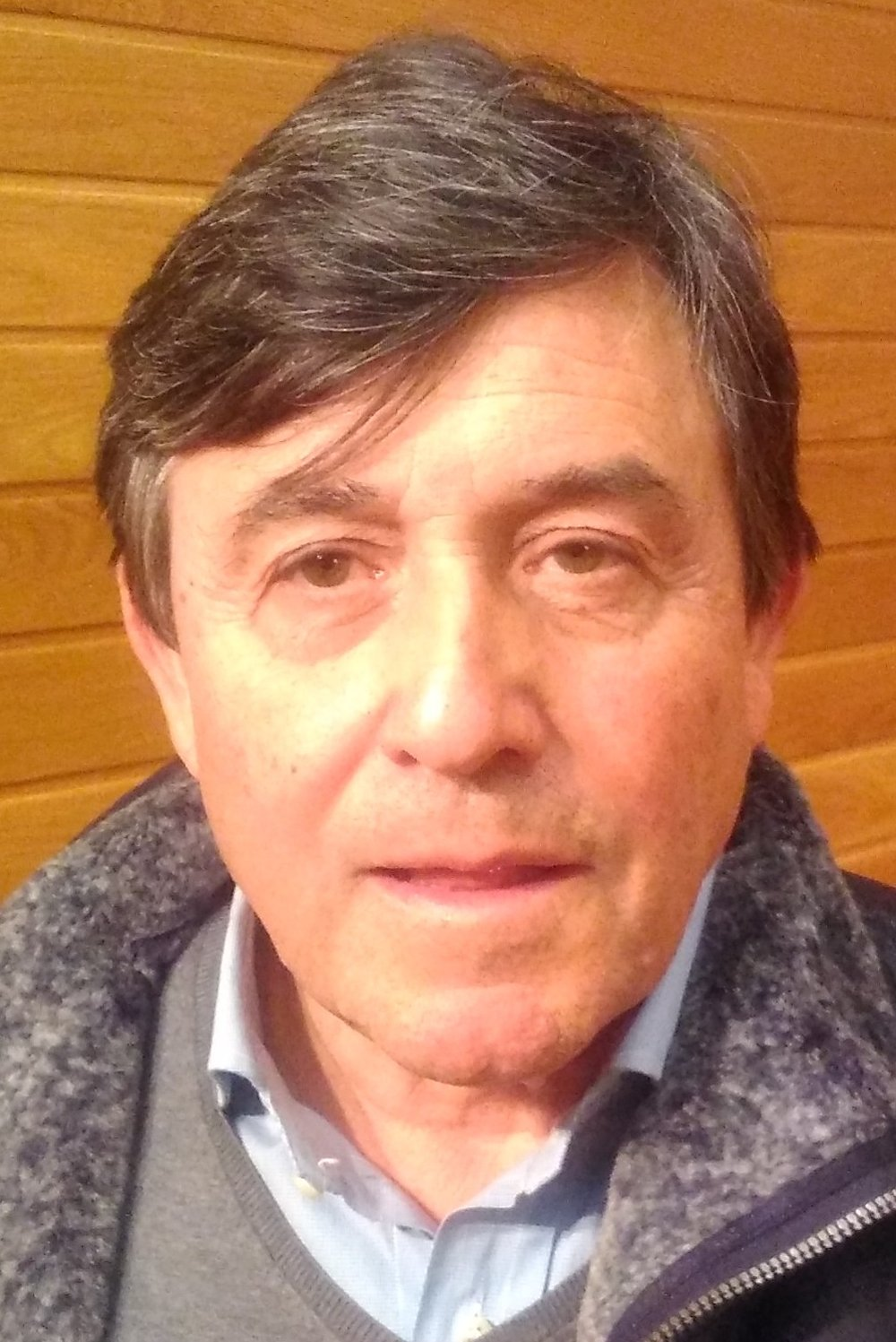

	First party	Second party	Third party
Leader	Pedro Sanz	José Ignacio Pérez Sáenz	Miguel González de Legarra
Party	PP	PSOE	PR+
Leader since	2 October 1993	1987	16 December 1995
Last election	17 seats, 49.4%	12 seats, 34.1%	2 seats, 6.7%
Seats won	18	13	2
Seat change	▲1	▲1	0
Popular vote	80,088	55,126	9,004
Percentage	51.3%	35.3%	5.8%
Swing	▲1.9 pp	▲1.2 pp	▼0.9 pp
President before election
Pedro Sanz
PP
Elected President
Pedro Sanz
PP

The 1999 Riojan regional election was held on 13 June 1999 to elect the 5th Parliament of the autonomous community of La Rioja. All 33 seats in the Parliament were up for election. It was held concurrently with regional elections in twelve other autonomous communities and local elections all throughout Spain, as well as the 1999 European Parliament election.

In a turnout below 69%, the People's Party (PP) under incumbent President Pedro Sanz was re-elected for a second term in office with an increased absolute majority. The Spanish Socialist Workers' Party (PSOE) under former president José Ignacio Pérez Sáenz saw a slight increase in support, but the new PP majority meant that the party would remain in opposition. United Left (IU) failed to reach the 5% electoral threshold, resulting in the loss of all its 2 seats, while the Riojan Party (PR) maintained its 2 seats.

== Overview ==
=== Electoral system ===
The Parliament of La Rioja was the devolved, unicameral legislature of the autonomous community of La Rioja, having legislative power in regional matters as defined by the Spanish Constitution and the Riojan Statute of Autonomy, as well as the ability to vote confidence in or withdraw it from a President of the Autonomous Community. Voting for the Parliament was on the basis of universal suffrage, which comprised all nationals over 18 years of age, registered in La Rioja and in full enjoyment of their political rights.

The 33 members of the Parliament of La Rioja were elected using the D'Hondt method and a closed list proportional representation, with an electoral threshold of five percent of valid votes—which included blank ballots—being applied regionally.

The electoral law provided that parties, federations, coalitions and groupings of electors were allowed to present lists of candidates. However, groupings of electors were required to secure the signature of at least 1 percent of the electors registered in La Rioja. Electors were barred from signing for more than one list of candidates. Concurrently, parties and federations intending to enter in coalition to take part jointly at an election were required to inform the relevant Electoral Commission within ten days of the election being called.

=== Election date ===
The term of the Parliament of La Rioja expired four years after the date of its previous election. Elections to the Parliament were fixed for the fourth Sunday of May every four years. Legal amendments introduced in 1998 allowed for these to be held together with European Parliament elections, provided that they were scheduled for within a four month-timespan. The previous election was held on 28 May 1995, setting the election date for the Parliament concurrently with a European Parliament election on 13 June 1999.

After legal amendments earlier in 1999, the President of the Autonomous Community was granted the prerogative to dissolve the Parliament of La Rioja and call a snap election, provided that no motion of no confidence was in process, no nationwide election was due and some time requirements were met: namely, that dissolution did not occur either during the first legislative session or within the legislature's last year ahead of its scheduled expiry, nor before one year has elapsed since a previous dissolution. In the event of an investiture process failing to elect a regional President within a two-month period from the first ballot, the Parliament was to be automatically dissolved and a fresh election called. Any snap election held as a result of these circumstances would not alter the period to the next ordinary election, with elected lawmakers serving the remainder of its original four-year term.

== Opinion polls ==
The table below lists voting intention estimates in reverse chronological order, showing the most recent first and using the dates when the survey fieldwork was done, as opposed to the date of publication. Where the fieldwork dates are unknown, the date of publication is given instead. The highest percentage figure in each polling survey is displayed with its background shaded in the leading party's colour. If a tie ensues, this is applied to the figures with the highest percentages. The "Lead" column on the right shows the percentage-point difference between the parties with the highest percentages in a poll. When available, seat projections determined by the polling organisations are displayed below (or in place of) the percentages in a smaller font; 17 seats were required for an absolute majority in the Parliament of La Rioja.

Polling firm/Commissioner	Fieldwork date	Sample size	Turnout	PP	PSOE	IU	PR	Lead
1999 regional election	13 Jun 1999	—N/a	68.7	51.3; 18	35.3; 13	3.9; 0	5.8; 2	16.0
Eco Consulting/ABC	24 May–2 Jun 1999	?	?	48.1; 16/17	35.9; 12/13	5.9; 2	7.3; 2	12.2
Demoscopia/El País	26 May–1 Jun 1999	?	71	53.5; 18/19	34.5; 12	6.2; 2	4.9; 0/1	19.0
Sigma Dos/El Mundo	18–24 May 1999	600	?	48.6; 16/18	37.5; 12/13	6.0; 2	5.4; 1/2	11.1
CIS	3–19 May 1999	398	73.5	54.2; 18/19	33.1; 11/12	6.1; 2	5.0; 1	21.1
1996 general election	3 Mar 1996	—N/a	80.9	49.4 (17)	36.6 (13)	8.7 (3)	3.4 (0)	12.8
1995 regional election	28 May 1995	—N/a	76.2	49.4; 17	34.1; 12	7.2; 2	6.7; 2	15.3

== Results ==
← Summary of the 13 June 1999 Parliament of La Rioja election results →
Parties and alliances	Popular vote			Seats	
Parties and alliances	Votes	%	±pp	Total	+/−
People's Party (PP)	80,088	51.26	+1.82	18	+1
Spanish Socialist Workers' Party (PSOE)	55,126	35.28	+1.19	13	+1
Riojan Party (PR)	9,004	5.76	−0.94	2	±0
United Left La Rioja (IU)	6,104	3.91	−3.30	0	−2
The Greens (LV)	1,971	1.26	New	0	±0
Movement for Humanist Socialism (MASH)	418	0.27	New	0	±0
Blank ballots	3,535	2.26	+0.53		
Total	156,246			33	±0
Valid votes	156,246	99.13	−0.17		
Invalid votes	1,377	0.87	+0.17		
Votes cast / turnout	157,623	68.66	−7.50		
Abstentions	71,946	31.34	+7.50		
Registered voters	229,569				

Popular vote
PP	51.26%
PSOE	35.28%
PR	5.76%
IU	3.91%
LV	1.26%
Others	0.27%
Blank ballots	2.26%

Seats
PP	54.55%
PSOE	39.39%
PR	6.06%

== Aftermath ==
Investiture; Pedro Sanz (PP)
Ballot →	9 July 1999
Required majority →	17 out of 33
Yes: • PP (18)	18 / 33
No: • PSOE (13); • PR (2)	15 / 33
Abstentions	0 / 33
Absentees	0 / 33
