= Government of José Ignacio Ceniceros =

Ceniceros government
- Government of La Rioja

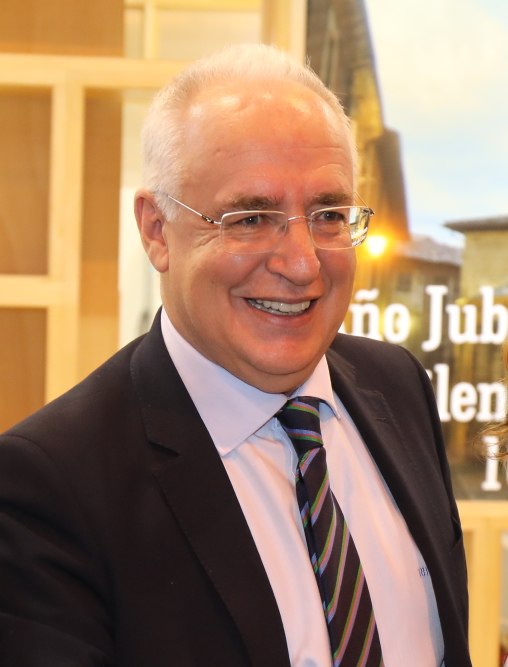
- Date formed: 6 July 2015
- Date dissolved: 29 August 2019

People and organisations
- Head of government: José Ignacio Ceniceros
- No. of ministers: 9
- Ministers removed: 3
- Total no. of members: 12
- Member party: People's Party
- Status in legislature: Minority government 15 / 33 (45%)
- Opposition party: Socialist Party
- Opposition leader: Concha Andreu

History
- Election: 24 May 2015
- Outgoing election: 26 May 2019
- Legislature term: 8th Parliament (2015–19)
- Predecessor: Sanz
- Successor: Andreu

The Ceniceros government was the regional government of La Rioja led by President José Ignacio Ceniceros. It was formed in July 2015 after the regional election and ended in August 2019 following the regional election.

== Government ==
Name	Portrait	Party	Office	Took office	Left office	^{Refs.}
José Ignacio Ceniceros		People's Party of La Rioja	President	6 July 2015	28 August 2019	
José Abel Bayo		People's Party of La Rioja	Minister of Education, Training and Employment	11 July 2015	3 November 2016	
Alberto Bretón		People's Party of La Rioja	Minister of Social Policies, Family, Equality and Justice	11 April 2019	29 August 2019	
Antonino Burgos		People's Party of La Rioja	Minister of Promotion and Territorial Policy	11 July 2015	18 March 2016	
Carlos Cuevas		People's Party of La Rioja	Minister of Promotion and Territorial Policy	18 March 2016	29 August 2019	
María Martín Díez		People's Party of La Rioja	Minister of Health	11 July 2015	29 August 2019	
Alfonso Domínguez		People's Party of La Rioja	Minister of Public Administration and Finance	11 July 2015	29 August 2019	
Conrado Escobar		People's Party of La Rioja	Minister of Social Policies, Family, Equality and Justice	11 July 2015	11 April 2019	
Alberto Galiana		People's Party of La Rioja	Minister of Education, Training and Employment	3 November 2016	29 August 2019	
Leonor González		People's Party of La Rioja	Minister of Economic Development and Innovation	11 July 2015	29 August 2019	
Begoña Martínez		People's Party of La Rioja	Minister of the Presidency, Institutional Relations and External Action	11 July 2015	29 August 2019	
Íñigo Nagore		People's Party of La Rioja	Minister of Agriculture, Livestock and Environment	11 July 2015	29 August 2019	
