= 2011 Riojan regional election =

Election in the Spanish region of La Rioja

- 22 May 2011

All 33 seats in the Parliament of La Rioja 17 seats needed for a majority
- Opinion polls
- Registered: 242,007 ▲1.8%
- Turnout: 168,826 (69.8%) ▼3.5 pp
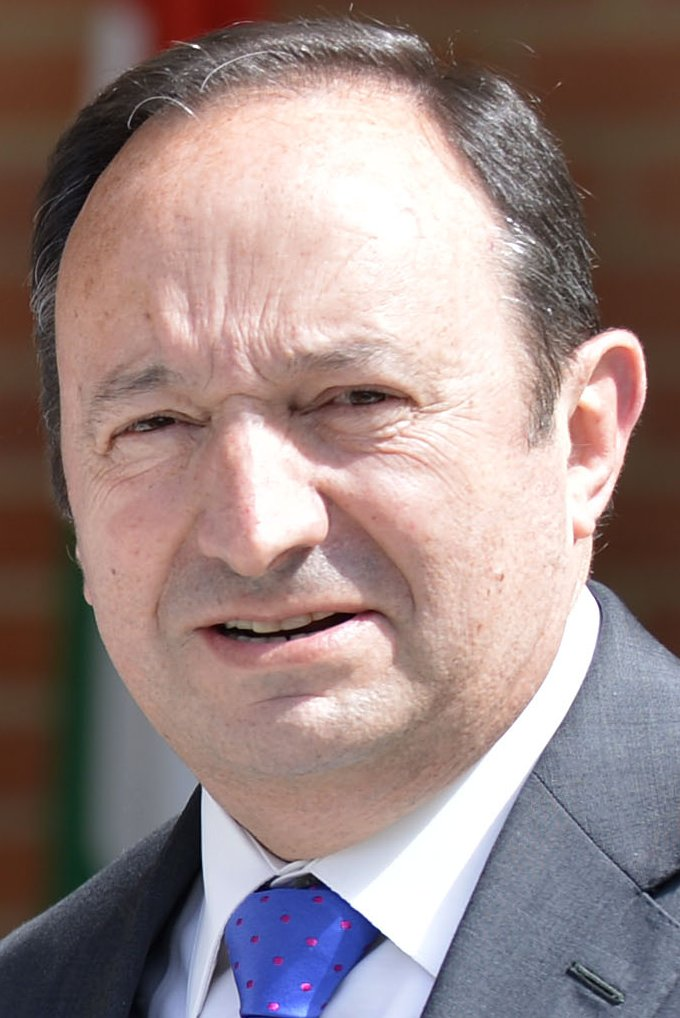

	First party	Second party	Third party
Leader	Pedro Sanz	Francisco Martínez-Aldama	Miguel González de Legarra
Party	PP	PSOE	PR+
Leader since	2 October 1993	30 July 2000	16 December 1995
Last election	17 seats, 48.8%	14 seats, 40.4%	2 seats, 6.0%
Seats won	20	11	2
Seat change	▲3	▼3	0
Popular vote	85,975	50,169	8,983
Percentage	52.0%	30.3%	5.4%
Swing	▲3.2 pp	▼10.1 pp	▼0.6 pp
President before election
Pedro Sanz
PP
Elected President
Pedro Sanz
PP

The 2011 Riojan regional election was held on 22 May 2011 to elect the 8th Parliament of the autonomous community of La Rioja. All 33 seats in the Parliament were up for election. It was held concurrently with regional elections in twelve other autonomous communities and local elections all throughout Spain.

The People's Party (PP) had formed the government of the region since the 1995 election, holding a majority of seats since then. As a result of the Spanish Socialist Workers' Party (PSOE) collapse at the national level, the PP increased its majority, gaining 3 seats and obtaining its best historical result in a regional election; the same 3 seats that were lost by the PSOE, which obtained its worst result ever. The Riojan Party (PR) held its 2 seats with a slightly reduced vote share.

== Overview ==
=== Electoral system ===
The Parliament of La Rioja was the devolved, unicameral legislature of the autonomous community of La Rioja, having legislative power in regional matters as defined by the Spanish Constitution and the Riojan Statute of Autonomy, as well as the ability to vote confidence in or withdraw it from a President of the Autonomous Community. Voting for the Parliament was on the basis of universal suffrage, which comprised all nationals over 18 years of age, registered in La Rioja and in full enjoyment of their political rights. Amendments to the electoral law in 2011 required for Riojans abroad to apply for voting before being permitted to vote, a system known as "begged" or expat vote (Spanish: Voto rogado).

The 33 members of the Parliament of La Rioja were elected using the D'Hondt method and a closed list proportional representation, with an electoral threshold of five percent of valid votes—which included blank ballots—being applied regionally.

The electoral law provided that parties, federations, coalitions and groupings of electors were allowed to present lists of candidates. However, groupings of electors were required to secure the signature of at least 1 percent of the electors registered in La Rioja. Electors were barred from signing for more than one list of candidates. Concurrently, parties and federations intending to enter in coalition to take part jointly at an election were required to inform the relevant Electoral Commission within ten days of the election being called.

=== Election date ===
The term of the Parliament of La Rioja expired four years after the date of its previous election. Elections to the Parliament were fixed for the fourth Sunday of May every four years. The previous election was held on 27 May 2007, setting the election date for the Parliament on 22 May 2011.

The President of the Autonomous Community had the prerogative to dissolve the Parliament of La Rioja and call a snap election, provided that no motion of no confidence was in process, no nationwide election was due and some time requirements were met: namely, that dissolution did not occur either during the first legislative session or within the legislature's last year ahead of its scheduled expiry, nor before one year has elapsed since a previous dissolution. In the event of an investiture process failing to elect a regional President within a two-month period from the first ballot, the Parliament was to be automatically dissolved and a fresh election called. Any snap election held as a result of these circumstances would not alter the period to the next ordinary election, with elected lawmakers serving the remainder of its original four-year term.

== Opinion polls ==
The table below lists voting intention estimates in reverse chronological order, showing the most recent first and using the dates when the survey fieldwork was done, as opposed to the date of publication. Where the fieldwork dates are unknown, the date of publication is given instead. The highest percentage figure in each polling survey is displayed with its background shaded in the leading party's colour. If a tie ensues, this is applied to the figures with the highest percentages. The "Lead" column on the right shows the percentage-point difference between the parties with the highest percentages in a poll. When available, seat projections determined by the polling organisations are displayed below (or in place of) the percentages in a smaller font; 17 seats were required for an absolute majority in the Parliament of La Rioja.

Polling firm/Commissioner	Fieldwork date	Sample size	Turnout	PP	PSOE	PR	IU	UPyD	Lead
2011 regional election	22 May 2011	—N/a	69.8	52.0; 20	30.3; 11	5.4; 2	3.7; 0	3.6; 0	21.7
NC Report/La Razón (Note: "El PP blinda sus feudos". La Razón (in Spanish). 16 May 2011. Archived from the original on 16 September 2011.)	3–10 May 2011	?	?	51.1; 17/18	34.5; 13/14	? 2	–	–	16.6
TNS Demoscopia/Antena 3 (Note: "Encuesta de TNS para Antena 3 y Onda Cero. Elecciones 22M. Expectativas electorales en La Rioja" (PDF). TNS Demoscopia (in Spanish). 7 May 2011. Archived from the original on 26 June 2012.)	4–5 May 2011	500	?	51.9; 19/20	31.2; 11/12	5.7; 2	4.1; 0	–	20.7
NC Report/La Razón (Note: "El PSOE se rinde al PP". La Razón (in Spanish). 25 April 2011. Archived from the original on 25 June 2011.)	25 Apr 2011	?	?	? 18	? 13	? 2	–	–	?
Celeste-Tel/Terra	13–20 Apr 2011	400	?	52.7; 19	32.1; 12	5.7; 2	4.6; 0	–	20.6
CIS	17 Mar–18 Apr 2011	784	?	50.9; 19	31.5; 12	6.7; 2	4.2; 0	1.5; 0	19.4
Sigma Dos/El Mundo (Note: "Sanz consolida su ventaja en La Rioja (El Mundo)". Electómetro (in Spanish). 25 April 2011. Archived from the original on 27 April 2011.)	12–15 Apr 2011	400	?	53.3; 19/20	35.4; 13	4.6; 0/1	–	–	17.9
Ikerfel/Vocento	10–12 Apr 2011	1,000	?	48.1; 17/18	37.9; 13/14	5.2; 1/2	–	–	10.2
GAD/ABC	10–16 Mar 2011	600	?	50.9; 18	36.9; 13	5.6; 2	–	–	14.0
Sigma Dos/El Mundo	7 Jan 2011	400	?	52.3; 18/19	33.8; 12/13	6.5; 2	–	–	18.5
Sigma Dos/El Mundo	25–26 May 2010	400	?	51.6; 18/20	36.6; 13/14	4.7; 0/1	3.2; 0	–	15.0
Sigma Dos/Diario La Rioja (Note: "El PP ganaría hasta 2 escaños más a costa de PSOE y PR (La Rioja)". Electómetro (in Spanish). 25 May 2010. Archived from the original on 3 June 2010.)	14–18 May 2010	1,000	?	50.7; 18/19	36.3; 13	5.2; 1/2	3.1; 0	–	14.4
Diario La Rioja (Note: "Un sondeo de larioja.com augura otra mayoría absoluta del PP en La Rioja". Electómetro (in Spanish). 22 April 2010. Archived from the original on 1 May 2010.)	3–24 Mar 2010	838	?	? 18	? 13	? 2	–	–	?
2009 EP election	7 Jun 2009	—N/a	50.4	50.7 (18)	40.6 (15)	–	1.9 (0)	3.0 (0)	10.1
2008 general election	9 Mar 2008	—N/a	79.3	49.5 (18)	43.6 (15)	1.5 (0)	1.9 (0)	1.3 (0)	5.9
2007 regional election	27 May 2007	—N/a	73.3	48.8; 17	40.4; 14	6.0; 2	3.1; 0	–	8.4

== Results ==
← Summary of the 22 May 2011 Parliament of La Rioja election results →
Parties and alliances	Popular vote			Seats	
Parties and alliances	Votes	%	±pp	Total	+/−
People's Party (PP)	85,975	51.98	+3.17	20	+3
Spanish Socialist Workers' Party (PSOE)	50,169	30.33	−10.08	11	−3
Riojan Party (PR)	8,983	5.43	−0.57	2	±0
United Left of La Rioja (IU)	6,114	3.70	+0.64	0	±0
Union, Progress and Democracy (UPyD)	5,891	3.56	New	0	±0
Greens of La Rioja–Ecolo (Ecolo–V)	2,041	1.23	New	0	±0
For a Fairer World (PUM+J)	697	0.42	New	0	±0
Anti-Bullfighting Party Against Mistreatment of Animals (PACMA)	567	0.34	New	0	±0
Communist Party of the Peoples of Spain (PCPE)	482	0.29	New	0	±0
Blank ballots	4,496	2.72	+1.00		
Total	165,415			33	±0
Valid votes	165,415	97.98	−1.23		
Invalid votes	3,411	2.02	+1.23		
Votes cast / turnout	168,826	69.76	−3.54		
Abstentions	73,181	30.24	+3.54		
Registered voters	242,007				

Popular vote
PP	51.98%
PSOE	30.33%
PR	5.43%
IU	3.70%
UPyD	3.56%
Ecolo–V	1.23%
Others	1.06%
Blank ballots	2.72%

Seats
PP	60.61%
PSOE	33.33%
PR	6.06%

== Aftermath ==
Investiture; Pedro Sanz (PP)
Ballot →	22 June 2011
Required majority →	17 out of 33
Yes: • PP (20)	20 / 33
No: • PSOE (11)	11 / 33
Abstentions: • PR (2)	2 / 33
Absentees	0 / 33
