= Diego Ubis =

Spanish politician (born 1977)

Diego Ubis López (born 13 June 1977) is a Spanish former politician. He led the Citizens group in the Parliament of La Rioja from 2015 to 2019.

== Biography ==
Born in Logroño in La Rioja, Ubis graduated in business and tourism from the University of Zaragoza, and has a master's degree in oenologic tourism from the University of La Rioja. Before taking office, he was the car park manager at the La Rioja Biomedical Research Centre.

In March 2015, Ubis was chosen as Citizens' lead candidate for the 2015 Riojan regional election. His party entered the Parliament of La Rioja for the first time with four seats, as did Podemos, while the People's Party (PP) lost their majority and the Riojan Party lost all its seats. His party abstained on the first vote for the President of La Rioja, which meant that a majority was not gained and it went to a second vote. By then, his party had reached an agreement with the PP to vote in favour of José Ignacio Ceniceros; this was not an agreement to form a coalition government.

In late 2018, Ubis took paternity leave for the birth of his second daughter, and spent the next ten weeks on half-days between parliament and home. This period corresponded with debates on the budget and the Statute of Autonomy. He said that his decision was independent of his party's agenda to promote paternal leave.

Ahead of the 2019 Riojan regional election, Ubis announced that he would not run, for personal reasons. In the November 2019 Spanish general election, he led the party's list to defend their one Senate of Spain seat in the La Rioja constituency, but the four seats went equally between the PP and Spanish Socialist Workers' Party. In early 2020, at Citizens' convention, he aligned with the sector critical of Inés Arrimadas.
