= Francisco Martínez-Aldama =

Spanish politician

Juan Francisco Martínez-Aldama Sáenz (born 4 October 1965) is a Spanish Socialist Workers' Party (PSOE) politician. He was a councillor in his hometown of Herce from 1995 to 2003. In 2000, he was elected secretary general of the PSOE in La Rioja, and led them in elections to the Parliament of La Rioja in 2003, 2007 and 2011, losing each time. In 2011, he was elected to the Senate of Spain, remaining there until 2019.

== Biography ==
Aldama was born in Herce in La Rioja. While his father was a supporter of the Union of the Democratic Centre (UCD), Aldama preferred the Spanish Socialist Workers' Party (PSOE) of Felipe González, having seen him on the television when he was 10.

Aldama studied a philosophy degree at the University of Zaragoza, where he began his political activism in the youth sector of the PSOE. Upon returning home, he joined regional chapter of the PSOE in November 1988, in Arnedo. From 1991–1994 he was a member of the regional party executive, and then vice secretary-general of the group in Arnedo.

From 1995 to 2003, Aldama was a member of the council in Herce. On 29 July 2000, he was elected secretary-general of the PSOE of La Rioja at their congress; on the same day, ETA assassinated PSOE politician Juan María Jáuregui and Aldama went to a demonstration against terrorism in San Sebastián the following day, meeting new PSOE national secretary-general and future prime minister of Spain, José Luis Rodríguez Zapatero. Aldama led the PSOE in elections to the Parliament of La Rioja in 2003, 2007 and 2011, losing all three times to the People's Party (PP), whose leader Pedro Sanz was President of La Rioja with an absolute majority each time. During Aldama's 12 years in charge of the regional party, his followers were known as "Kikistas", after his nickname, Kiko.

In the 2011 Spanish general election, Aldama was elected to the Senate of Spain by the La Rioja constituency; the PP took three seats and he took the other. He was re-elected in December 2015 and June 2016. He was not included on the PSOE list for the senate in the constituency in April 2019.

== Personal life ==
Aldama is married and has two children. His cousin Jesús Ibáñez Martínez-Aldama was elected mayor of Herce, also for the PSOE.
