= 2015 Riojan regional election =

Election in the Spanish region of La Rioja

- 24 May 2015

All 33 seats in the Parliament of La Rioja 17 seats needed for a majority
- Opinion polls
- Registered: 247,663 ▲2.3%
- Turnout: 166,649 (67.3%) ▼2.5 pp
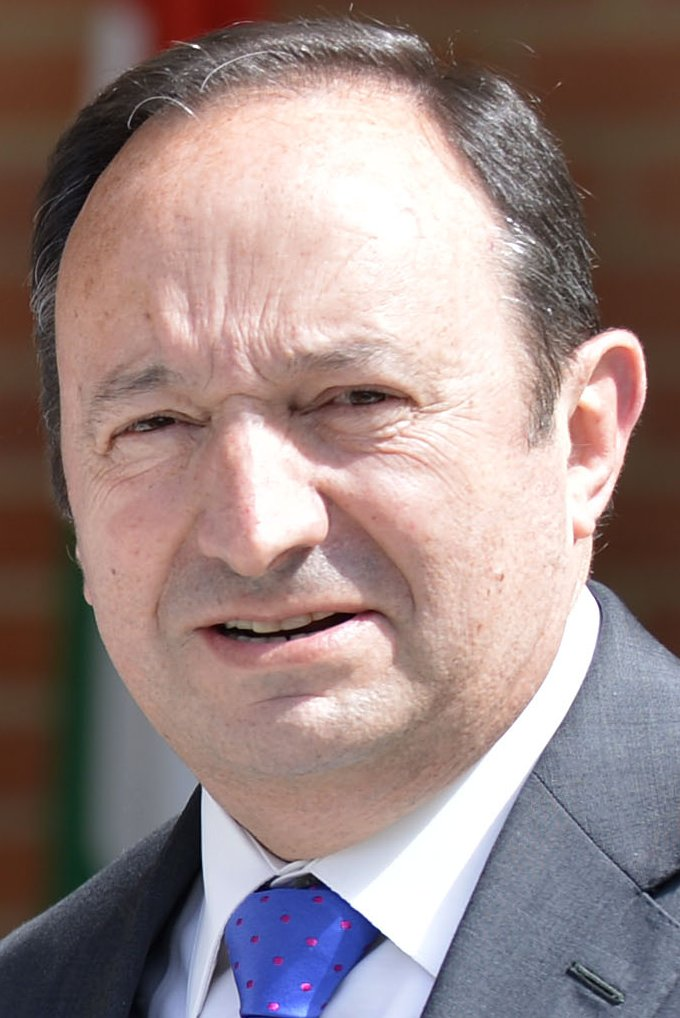

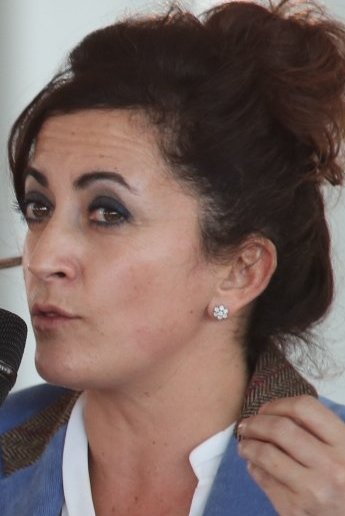

	First party	Second party	Third party
Leader	Pedro Sanz	Concha Andreu	Germán Cantabrana
Party	PP	PSOE	Podemos
Leader since	2 October 1993	19 October 2014	14 April 2015
Last election	20 seats, 52.0%	11 seats, 30.3%	Did not contest
Seats won	15	10	4
Seat change	▼5	▼1	▲4
Popular vote	63,094	43,689	18,319
Percentage	38.6%	26.7%	11.2%
Swing	▼13.4 pp	▼3.6 pp	New party
	Fourth party	Fifth party
Leader	Diego Ubis	Miguel González de Legarra
Party	C's	PR+
Leader since	8 March 2015	16 December 1995
Last election	Did not contest	2 seats, 5.4%
Seats won	4	0
Seat change	▲4	▼2
Popular vote	17,042	7,277
Percentage	10.4%	4.5%
Swing	New party	▼0.9 pp
President before election
Pedro Sanz
PP
Elected President
José Ignacio Ceniceros
PP

The 2015 Riojan regional election was held on 24 May 2015 to elect the 9th Parliament of the autonomous community of La Rioja. All 33 seats in the Parliament were up for election. It was held concurrently with regional elections in twelve other autonomous communities and local elections all throughout Spain.

Reflecting a national trend, the governing People's Party (PP) and the opposition Spanish Socialist Workers' Party (PSOE) both lost support, to the benefit of the new left-wing party Podemos (Spanish for "We can") and the centrist party Citizens (C's). The PP retained the largest number of seats, but lost its overall majority for the first time since 1995.

== Overview ==
=== Electoral system ===
The Parliament of La Rioja was the devolved, unicameral legislature of the autonomous community of La Rioja, having legislative power in regional matters as defined by the Spanish Constitution and the Riojan Statute of Autonomy, as well as the ability to vote confidence in or withdraw it from a President of the Autonomous Community. Voting for the Parliament was on the basis of universal suffrage, which comprised all nationals over 18 years of age, registered in La Rioja and in full enjoyment of their political rights. Additionally, Riojans abroad were required to apply for voting before being permitted to vote, a system known as "begged" or expat vote (Spanish: Voto rogado).

The 33 members of the Parliament of La Rioja were elected using the D'Hondt method and a closed list proportional representation, with an electoral threshold of five percent of valid votes—which included blank ballots—being applied regionally.

The electoral law provided that parties, federations, coalitions and groupings of electors were allowed to present lists of candidates. However, groupings of electors were required to secure the signature of at least 1 percent of the electors registered in La Rioja. Electors were barred from signing for more than one list of candidates. Concurrently, parties and federations intending to enter in coalition to take part jointly at an election were required to inform the relevant Electoral Commission within ten days of the election being called.

=== Election date ===
The term of the Parliament of La Rioja expired four years after the date of its previous election. Elections to the Parliament were fixed for the fourth Sunday of May every four years. The previous election was held on 22 May 2011, setting the election date for the Parliament on 24 May 2015.

The President of the Autonomous Community had the prerogative to dissolve the Parliament of La Rioja and call a snap election, provided that no motion of no confidence was in process, no nationwide election was due and some time requirements were met: namely, that dissolution did not occur either during the first legislative session or within the legislature's last year ahead of its scheduled expiry, nor before one year had elapsed since a previous dissolution. In the event of an investiture process failing to elect a regional President within a two-month period from the first ballot, the Parliament was to be automatically dissolved and a fresh election called. Any snap election held as a result of these circumstances would not alter the period to the next ordinary election, with elected lawmakers serving the remainder of its original four-year term.

== Opinion polls ==
The table below lists voting intention estimates in reverse chronological order, showing the most recent first and using the dates when the survey fieldwork was done, as opposed to the date of publication. Where the fieldwork dates are unknown, the date of publication is given instead. The highest percentage figure in each polling survey is displayed with its background shaded in the leading party's colour. If a tie ensues, this is applied to the figures with the highest percentages. The "Lead" column on the right shows the percentage-point difference between the parties with the highest percentages in a poll. When available, seat projections determined by the polling organisations are displayed below (or in place of) the percentages in a smaller font; 17 seats were required for an absolute majority in the Parliament of La Rioja.

Color key:

Poll conducted after legal ban on opinion polls

Polling firm/Commissioner	Fieldwork date	Sample size	Turnout	PP	PSOE	PR+	IU	UPyD	Podemos	C's	Lead
2015 regional election	24 May 2015	—N/a	67.3	38.6; 15	26.7; 10	4.5; 0	4.2; 0	1.2; 0	11.2; 4	10.4; 4	11.9
GAD3/Antena 3	11–22 May 2015	?	?	? 16/17	? 9/10	–	? 0/1	–	? 3/4	? 3/4	?
NC Report/La Razón	17 May 2015	300	?	42.8; 16/17	26.5; 10/11	4.9; 0	3.9; 0	1.4; 0	9.1; 3/4	9.5; 3/4	16.3
GAD3/Diario La Rioja	6–12 May 2015	1,002	?	41.3; 16/17	23.5; 9	3.9; 0	4.6; 0/1	1.9; 0	9.8; 3/4	10.3; 3/4	17.8
CIS	23 Mar–19 Apr 2015	774	?	38.7; 15/16	22.3; 8/9	4.6; 0	4.2; 0	1.7; 0	11.6; 4	13.1; 5	16.4
NC Report/La Razón	6–10 Apr 2015	300	?	44.1; 17/18	27.3; 10/11	4.7; 0	3.2; 0	2.1; 0	8.6; 3/4	7.2; 2/3	16.8
GAD3/Diario La Rioja	19–27 Jan 2015	1,000	?	44.2; 17/18	19.1; 7/8	4.2; 0/2	4.1; 0/2	3.6; 0	14.8; 5/6	3.9; 0	25.1
Llorente & Cuenca	31 Oct 2014	?	?	? 14/16	? 9/10	? 2	? 1/2	? 2	? 2/3	–	?
2014 EP election	25 May 2014	—N/a	47.5	38.4 (15)	23.7 (9)	–	8.1 (3)	9.0 (3)	7.5 (3)	2.3 (0)	14.7
Infortécnica	1 May 2014	334	?	51.2; 18/19	25.6; 8/9	4.7; 1/2	4.7; 0/2	14.0; 3/4	–	–	25.6
GAD3/ABC	17–28 Mar 2014	?	?	47.9; 19	26.3; 10	–	6.3; 2	6.7; 2	–	–	21.6
Celeste-Tel/PSOE	11–18 Dec 2013	1,000	65.7	46.3; 16/17	30.0; 10/11	8.2; 2/3	7.4; 2	5.6; 2	–	–	16.3
NC Report/La Razón (Note: "El PP ganaría de nuevo en 9 de 13 autonomías". La Razón (in Spanish). 18 November 2013. Archived from the original on 3 March 2016.)	15 Oct–12 Nov 2013	?	?	45.6; 17/18	27.0; 10	5.1; 1/2	7.3; 2	6.7; 1/2	–	–	18.6
GAD3/Diario La Rioja (Note: "EL PP conserva la mayoría absoluta en La Rioja (La Rioja)". Electómetro (in Spanish). 17 June 2013. Archived from the original on 20 June 2013.)	30 Apr–22 May 2013	1,000	?	46.6; 18	25.8; 10	4.1; 0	8.1; 3	6.8; 2	–	–	20.8
NC Report/La Razón	15 Apr–10 May 2013	200	?	45.3; 17/18	28.9; 10/11	? 2/3	? 2	? 1/2	–	–	16.4
2011 general election	20 Nov 2011	—N/a	72.8	54.7 (20)	31.1 (11)	–	4.6 (0)	6.0 (2)	–	–	23.6
2011 regional election	22 May 2011	—N/a	69.8	52.0; 20	30.3; 11	5.4; 2	3.7; 0	3.6; 0	–	–	21.7

== Results ==
← Summary of the 24 May 2015 Parliament of La Rioja election results →
Parties and alliances	Popular vote			Seats	
Parties and alliances	Votes	%	±pp	Total	+/−
People's Party (PP)	63,094	38.62	−13.36	15	−5
Spanish Socialist Workers' Party (PSOE)	43,689	26.74	−3.59	10	−1
We Can (Podemos)	18,319	11.21	New	4	+4
Citizens–Party of the Citizenry (C's)	17,042	10.43	New	4	+4
Riojan Party (PR+)	7,277	4.45	−0.98	0	−2
Change La Rioja–United Left–Equo (CR–IU–Equo)	6,797	4.16	+0.46	0	±0
Union, Progress and Democracy (UPyD)	2,005	1.23	−2.33	0	±0
Animalist Party Against Mistreatment of Animals (PACMA)	1,205	0.74	+0.40	0	±0
Blank Seats (EB)	525	0.32	New	0	±0
Communist Party of the Peoples of Spain (PCPE)	481	0.29	±0.00	0	±0
Blank ballots	2,933	1.80	−0.92		
Total	163,367			33	±0
Valid votes	163,367	98.03	+0.05		
Invalid votes	3,282	1.97	−0.05		
Votes cast / turnout	166,649	67.29	−2.47		
Abstentions	81,014	32.71	+2.47		
Registered voters	247,663				

Popular vote
PP	38.62%
PSOE	26.74%
Podemos	11.21%
C's	10.43%
PR+	4.45%
CR–IU–Equo	4.16%
UPyD	1.23%
Others	1.35%
Blank ballots	1.80%

Seats
PP	45.45%
PSOE	30.30%
Podemos	12.12%
C's	12.12%

== Aftermath ==
Investiture; José Ignacio Ceniceros (PP)
Ballot →	1 July 2015	3 July 2015
Required majority →	17 out of 33	Simple
Yes: • PP (15)	15 / 33	15 / 33
No: • PSOE (10); • Podemos (4)	14 / 33	14 / 33
Abstentions: • C's (4)	4 / 33	4 / 33
Absentees	0 / 33	0 / 33
