= 2003 Riojan regional election =

Election in the Spanish region of La Rioja

2003 Rioja regional election
- 25 May 2003

All 33 seats in the Parliament of La Rioja 17 seats needed for a majority
- Registered: 233,553 ▲1.7%
- Turnout: 175,401 (75.1%) ▲6.4 pp
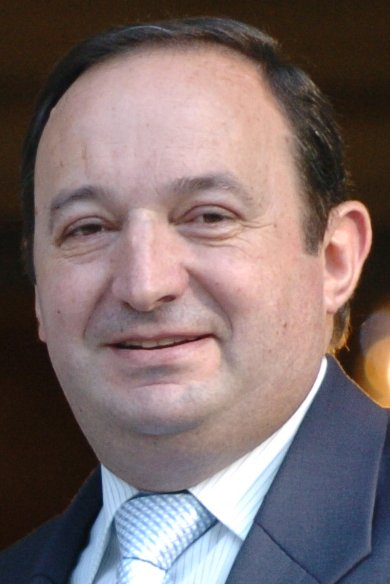

	First party	Second party	Third party
Leader	Pedro Sanz	Francisco Martínez-Aldama	Miguel González de Legarra
Party	PP	PSOE	PR+
Leader since	2 October 1993	30 July 2000	16 December 1995
Last election	18 seats, 51.3%	13 seats, 35.3%	2 seats, 5.8%
Seats won	17	14	2
Seat change	▼1	▲1	0
Popular vote	84,533	66,410	11,842
Percentage	48.6%	38.2%	6.8%
Swing	▼2.7 pp	▲2.9 pp	▲1.0 pp
President before election
Pedro Sanz
PP
Elected President
Pedro Sanz
PP

The 2003 Rioja regional election was held on 25 May 2003 to elect the 6th Parliament of the autonomous community of La Rioja. All 33 seats in the Parliament were up for election. It was held concurrently with regional elections in twelve other autonomous communities and local elections all throughout Spain.

== Overview ==
=== Electoral system ===
The Parliament of La Rioja was the devolved, unicameral legislature of the autonomous community of La Rioja, having legislative power in regional matters as defined by the Spanish Constitution and the Riojan Statute of Autonomy, as well as the ability to vote confidence in or withdraw it from a President of the Autonomous Community. Voting for the Parliament was on the basis of universal suffrage, which comprised all nationals over 18 years of age, registered in La Rioja and in full enjoyment of their political rights.

The 33 members of the Parliament of La Rioja were elected using the D'Hondt method and a closed list proportional representation, with an electoral threshold of five percent of valid votes—which included blank ballots—being applied regionally.

The electoral law provided that parties, federations, coalitions and groupings of electors were allowed to present lists of candidates. However, groupings of electors were required to secure the signature of at least 1 percent of the electors registered in La Rioja. Electors were barred from signing for more than one list of candidates. Concurrently, parties and federations intending to enter in coalition to take part jointly at an election were required to inform the relevant Electoral Commission within ten days of the election being called.

=== Election date ===
The term of the Parliament of La Rioja expired four years after the date of its previous election. Elections to the Parliament were fixed for the fourth Sunday of May every four years. The previous election was held on 13 June 1999, setting the election date for the Parliament on 25 May 2003.

The President of the Autonomous Community had the prerogative to dissolve the Parliament of La Rioja and call a snap election, provided that no motion of no confidence was in process, no nationwide election was due and some time requirements were met: namely, that dissolution did not occur either during the first legislative session or within the legislature's last year ahead of its scheduled expiry, nor before one year has elapsed since a previous dissolution. In the event of an investiture process failing to elect a regional President within a two-month period from the first ballot, the Parliament was to be automatically dissolved and a fresh election called. Any snap election held as a result of these circumstances would not alter the period to the next ordinary election, with elected lawmakers serving the remainder of its original four-year term.

== Opinion polls ==
The table below lists voting intention estimates in reverse chronological order, showing the most recent first and using the dates when the survey fieldwork was done, as opposed to the date of publication. Where the fieldwork dates are unknown, the date of publication is given instead. The highest percentage figure in each polling survey is displayed with its background shaded in the leading party's colour. If a tie ensues, this is applied to the figures with the highest percentages. The "Lead" column on the right shows the percentage-point difference between the parties with the highest percentages in a poll. When available, seat projections determined by the polling organisations are displayed below (or in place of) the percentages in a smaller font; 17 seats were required for an absolute majority in the Parliament of La Rioja.

Color key:

Exit poll

Polling firm/Commissioner	Fieldwork date	Sample size	Turnout	PP	PSOE	PR	IU	Lead
2003 regional election	25 May 2003	—N/a	75.1	48.6; 17	38.2; 14	6.8; 0	2.7; 2	10.4
Sigma Dos/Antena 3	25 May 2003	?	?	? 17/18	? 13/14	? 2	? 0	?
Ipsos–Eco/RTVE	25 May 2003	?	?	? 17/18	? 13/14	? 2	? 0	?
CIS	22 Mar–28 Apr 2003	608	73.5	48.5; 17	38.7; 14	5.8; 2	4.6; 0	9.8
CIS	9 Sep–9 Oct 2002	418	72.2	50.1	36.6	5.9	3.7	13.5
2000 general election	12 Mar 2000	—N/a	74.2	54.1 (20)	34.9 (13)	3.6 (0)	4.0 (0)	19.2
1999 regional election	13 Jun 1999	—N/a	68.7	51.3; 18	35.3; 13	5.8; 2	3.9; 0	16.0

== Results ==
← Summary of the 25 May 2003 Parliament of La Rioja election results →
Parties and alliances	Popular vote			Seats	
Parties and alliances	Votes	%	±pp	Total	+/−
People's Party (PP)	84,533	48.60	−2.66	17	−1
Spanish Socialist Workers' Party (PSOE)	66,410	38.18	+2.90	14	+1
Riojan Party (PR)	11,842	6.81	+1.05	2	±0
United Left La Rioja (IU)	4,729	2.72	−1.19	0	±0
The Greens of La Rioja (LV)	2,858	1.64	+0.38	0	±0
Movement for Humanist Socialism (MASH)	269	0.15	−0.12	0	±0
Blank ballots	3,308	1.90	−0.36		
Total	173,949			33	±0
Valid votes	173,949	99.17	+0.04		
Invalid votes	1,452	0.83	−0.04		
Votes cast / turnout	175,401	75.10	+6.44		
Abstentions	58,152	24.90	−6.44		
Registered voters	233,553				

Popular vote
PP	48.60%
PSOE	38.18%
PR	6.81%
IU	2.72%
LV	1.64%
Others	0.15%
Blank ballots	1.90%

Seats
PP	51.51%
PSOE	42.42%
PR	6.06%

== Aftermath ==
Investiture; Pedro Sanz (PP)
Ballot →	27 June 2003
Required majority →	17 out of 33
Yes: • PP (17)	17 / 33
No: • PSOE (14)	14 / 33
Abstentions: • PR (2)	2 / 33
Absentees	0 / 33
