= 1991 Riojan regional election =

Election in the Spanish region of La Rioja

- 26 May 1991

All 33 seats in the General Deputation of La Rioja 17 seats needed for a majority
- Opinion polls
- Registered: 210,080 ▲4.1%
- Turnout: 144,729 (68.9%) ▼3.6 pp
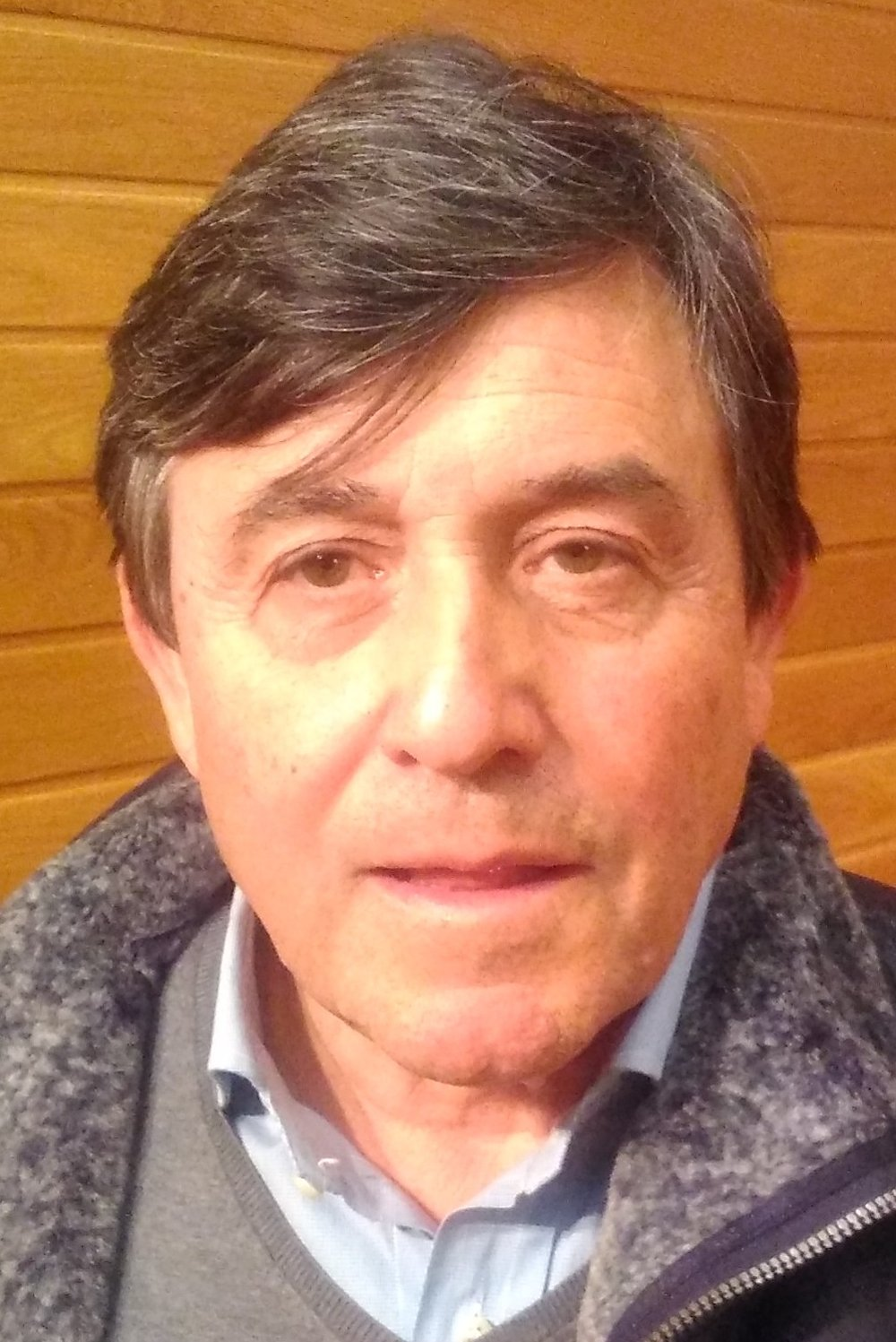

	First party	Second party	Third party
Leader	José Ignacio Pérez Sáenz	Joaquín Espert	Leopoldo Virosta
Party	PSOE	PP	PR+
Leader since	1987	1983	23 June 1990
Last election	14 seats, 39.6%	13 seats, 38.1% (Note: Results for AP (34.8%, 13 seats) and PDP (3.3%, 0 seats) in the 1987 election.)	2 seats, 6.4%
Seats won	16	15	2
Seat change	▲2	▲2	0
Popular vote	60,843	59,876	7,731
Percentage	42.4%	41.7%	5.4%
Swing	▲2.8 pp	▲3.6 pp	▼1.0 pp
President before election
José Ignacio Pérez Sáenz
PSOE
Elected President
José Ignacio Pérez Sáenz
PSOE

The 1991 Riojan regional election was held on 26 May 1991 to elect the 3rd General Deputation of the autonomous community of La Rioja. All 33 seats in the General Deputation were up for election. It was held concurrently with regional elections in twelve other autonomous communities and local elections all throughout Spain.

The ruling Spanish Socialist Workers' Party (PSOE) saw an increase in support and obtained 16 seats, one short of an overall majority. The newly founded People's Party (PP), whose leader Joaquín Espert had lost the regional government in 1990 to a motion of no confidence, won two additional seats compared to People's Alliance's results in 1987, for a total of 15. The Riojan Party (PR) was able to maintain its 2 seats after a convoluted legislature, while United Left remained 0.5 percentage points short of entering the General Deputation. The Democratic and Social Centre (CDS) did not reach the required 5% threshold either and lost all its seats.

As a result of the election, the incumbent PSOE–PR coalition, led by regional premier and PSOE leader José Ignacio Pérez Sáenz, was re-elected for a full term in office. This would be the last time that the PSOE would win a regional election and would be able to form a government in La Rioja until 2019.

== Overview ==
=== Electoral system ===
The General Deputation of La Rioja was the devolved, unicameral legislature of the autonomous community of La Rioja, having legislative power in regional matters as defined by the Spanish Constitution and the Riojan Statute of Autonomy, as well as the ability to vote confidence in or withdraw it from a President of the Autonomous Community. Voting for the General Deputation was on the basis of universal suffrage, which comprised all nationals over 18 years of age, registered in La Rioja and in full enjoyment of their political rights.

The 33 members of the General Deputation of La Rioja were elected using the D'Hondt method and a closed list proportional representation, with an electoral threshold of five percent of valid votes—which included blank ballots—being applied regionally.

The electoral law provided that parties, federations, coalitions and groupings of electors were allowed to present lists of candidates. However, groupings of electors were required to secure the signature of at least 1 percent of the electors registered in La Rioja. Electors were barred from signing for more than one list of candidates. Concurrently, parties and federations intending to enter in coalition to take part jointly at an election were required to inform the relevant Electoral Commission within ten days of the election being called.

=== Election date ===
The term of the General Deputation of La Rioja expired four years after the date of its previous election. Legal amendments earlier in 1991 established that elections to the General Deputation were to be fixed for the fourth Sunday of May every four years. The previous election was held on 10 June 1987, setting the election date for the General Deputation on 26 May 1991.

The General Deputation of La Rioja could not be dissolved before the expiration date of parliament except in the event of an investiture process failing to elect a regional President within a two-month period from the first ballot. In such a case, the General Deputation was to be automatically dissolved and a snap election called, with elected lawmakers serving the remainder of its original four-year term.

== Opinion polls ==
The table below lists voting intention estimates in reverse chronological order, showing the most recent first and using the dates when the survey fieldwork was done, as opposed to the date of publication. Where the fieldwork dates are unknown, the date of publication is given instead. The highest percentage figure in each polling survey is displayed with its background shaded in the leading party's colour. If a tie ensues, this is applied to the figures with the highest percentages. The "Lead" column on the right shows the percentage-point difference between the parties with the highest percentages in a poll. When available, seat projections determined by the polling organisations are displayed below (or in place of) the percentages in a smaller font; 17 seats were required for an absolute majority in the General Deputation of La Rioja.

Polling firm/Commissioner	Fieldwork date	Sample size	Turnout	PSOE	AP	CDS	PR	PDP	IU	PP	Lead
1991 regional election	26 May 1991	—N/a	68.9	42.4; 16	(Note: Within PP.)	4.4; 0	5.4; 2		4.5; 0	41.7; 15	0.7
Sigma Dos/El Mundo	18 May 1991	?	?	41.6; 15/16		6.3; 1/2	4.1; 0/1		6.6; 1/2	37.2; 13/14	4.4
Metra Seis/El Independiente	12 May 1991	?	?	37.5; 13/14		7.0; 2	5.8; 2		5.5; 1/2	39.1; 14/15	1.6
Demoscopia/El País	4–7 May 1991	300	?	36.9; 13/14		4.6; 0/1	5.6; 2		8.6; 3	39.2; 14	2.3
1989 general election	29 Oct 1989	—N/a	72.0	39.7 (14)		7.2 (2)	–		6.4 (2)	41.1 (15)	1.4
1989 EP election	15 Jun 1989	—N/a	58.6	38.7 (16)		7.6 (3)	2.1 (0)		3.7 (0)	33.0 (14)	5.7
1987 regional election	10 Jun 1987	—N/a	72.5	39.6; 14	34.8; 13	10.8; 4	6.4; 2	3.3; 0	2.4; 0	–	4.8

== Results ==
← Summary of the 26 May 1991 General Deputation of La Rioja election results →
Parties and alliances	Popular vote			Seats	
Parties and alliances	Votes	%	±pp	Total	+/−
Spanish Socialist Workers' Party (PSOE)	60,843	42.37	+2.73	16	+2
People's Party (PP)^{1}	59,876	41.70	+3.65	15	+2
Riojan Party (PR)	7,731	5.38	−1.01	2	±0
United Left (IU)	6,499	4.53	+2.12	0	±0
Democratic and Social Centre (CDS)	6,271	4.37	−6.47	0	−4
Blank ballots	2,373	1.65	−0.05		
Total	143,593			33	±0
Valid votes	143,593	99.22	+0.59		
Invalid votes	1,136	0.78	−0.59		
Votes cast / turnout	144,729	68.89	−3.61		
Abstentions	65,351	31.11	+3.61		
Registered voters	210,080				
Sources
Footnotes: ^{1} People's Party results are compared to People's Alliance totals in the 1987 election.

Popular vote
PSOE	42.37%
PP	41.70%
PR	5.38%
IU	4.53%
CDS	4.37%
Blank ballots	1.65%

Seats
PSOE	48.48%
PP	45.45%
PR	6.06%

== Aftermath ==
Investiture; José Ignacio Pérez Sáenz (PSOE)
Ballot →	28 June 1991
Required majority →	17 out of 33
Yes: • PSOE (16); • PR (2)	18 / 33
No: • PP (15)	15 / 33
Abstentions	0 / 33
Absentees	0 / 33
