= 1995 Riojan regional election =

Election in the Spanish region of La Rioja

- 28 May 1995

All 33 seats in the General Deputation of La Rioja 17 seats needed for a majority
- Opinion polls
- Registered: 218,519 ▲4.0%
- Turnout: 166,422 (76.2%) ▲7.3 pp
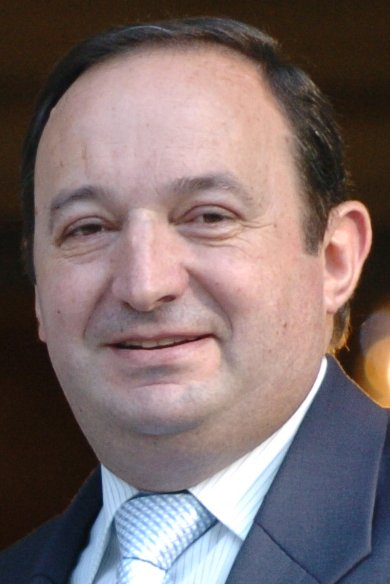

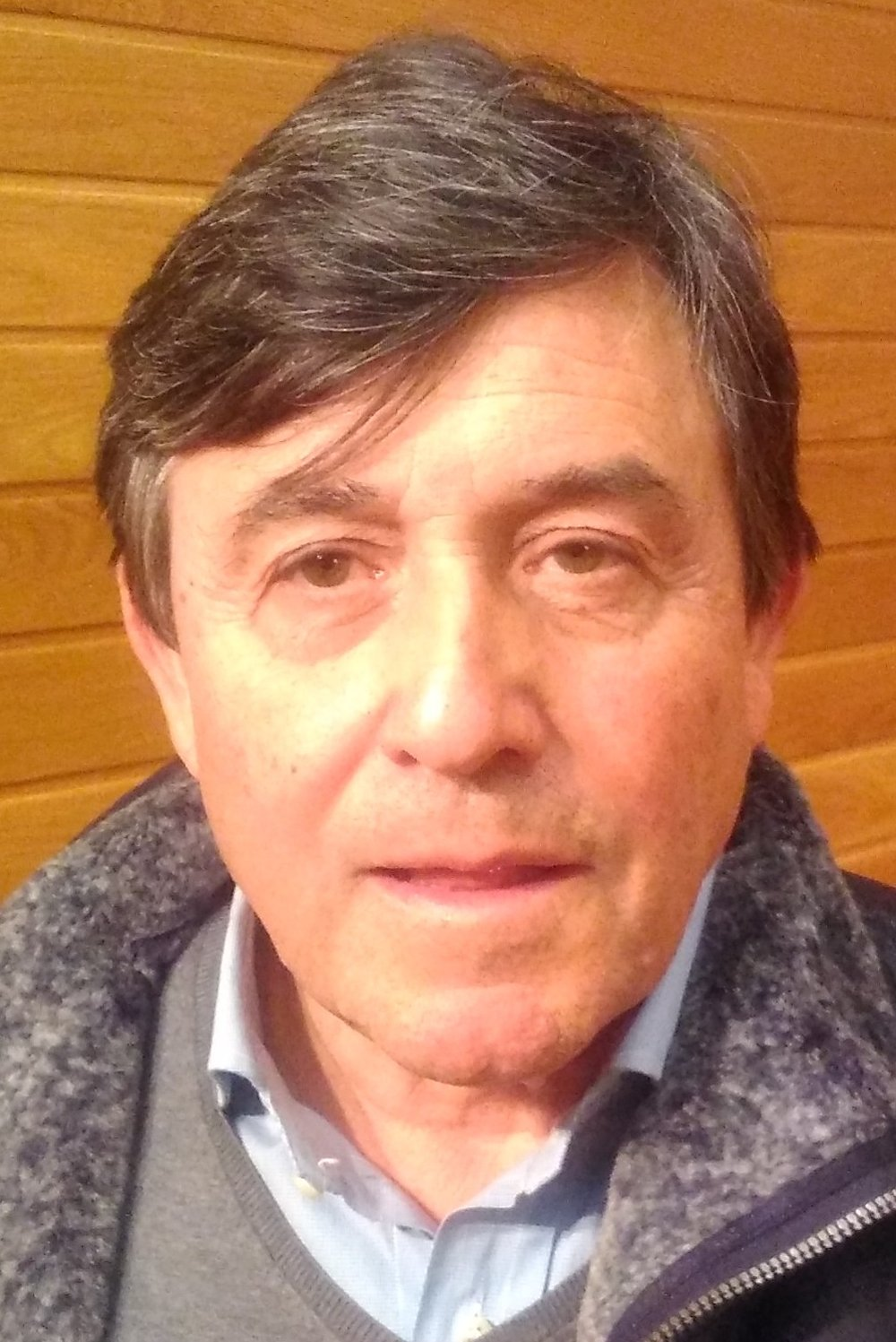

| | First party | Second party | Third party |
|---|---|---|---|
| Leader | Pedro Sanz | José Ignacio Pérez Sáenz | Jesús Rodríguez Rubio |
| Party | PP | PSOE | IU |
| Leader since | 2 October 1993 | 1987 | 1995 |
| Last election | 15 seats, 41.7% | 16 seats, 42.4% | 0 seats, 4.5% |
| Seats won | 17 | 12 | 2 |
| Seat change | ▲2 | ▼4 | ▲2 |
| Popular vote | 81,703 | 56,335 | 11,921 |
| Percentage | 49.4% | 34.1% | 7.2% |
| Swing | ▲7.7 pp | ▼8.3 pp | ▲2.7 pp |
| | Fourth party |
| Leader | Leopoldo Virosta |
| Party | PR+ |
| Leader since | 23 June 1990 |
| Last election | 2 seats, 5.4% |
| Seats won | 2 |
| Seat change | 0 |
| Popular vote | 11,069 |
| Percentage | 6.7% |
| Swing | ▲1.3 pp |
President before election
José Ignacio Pérez Sáenz
PSOE
Elected President
Pedro Sanz
PP

The 1995 Riojan regional election was held on 28 May 1995 to elect the 4th General Deputation of the autonomous community of La Rioja. All 33 seats in the General Deputation were up for election. It was held concurrently with regional elections in twelve other autonomous communities and local elections all throughout Spain.

For the first time, the People's Party (PP) emerged as the largest party in the General Deputation with an absolute majority of seats and almost 49% of the share, an increase of about eight percentage points from 1991. In contrast, the vote for the ruling Spanish Socialist Workers' Party (PSOE) fell to its lowest level up until that time, losing four of its previously 16 seats and remaining with 12. United Left (IU) benefited from the Socialist defeat and entered the General Deputation for the first time with 2 seats, whereas the Riojan Party (PR)—which had formed the regional government together with the PSOE since 1990—obtained its best result since 1983. Turnout, at 76.2%, was the highest to date for a regional election in La Rioja.

As a result of the election, PP leader Pedro Sanz became the new regional President, succeeding Socialist José Ignacio Pérez Sáenz.

== Overview ==
=== Electoral system ===
The General Deputation of La Rioja was the devolved, unicameral legislature of the autonomous community of La Rioja, having legislative power in regional matters as defined by the Spanish Constitution and the Riojan Statute of Autonomy, as well as the ability to vote confidence in or withdraw it from a President of the Autonomous Community. Voting for the General Deputation was on the basis of universal suffrage, which comprised all nationals over 18 years of age, registered in La Rioja and in full enjoyment of their political rights.

The 33 members of the General Deputation of La Rioja were elected using the D'Hondt method and a closed list proportional representation, with an electoral threshold of five percent of valid votes—which included blank ballots—being applied regionally.

The electoral law provided that parties, federations, coalitions and groupings of electors were allowed to present lists of candidates. However, groupings of electors were required to secure the signature of at least 1 percent of the electors registered in La Rioja. Electors were barred from signing for more than one list of candidates. Concurrently, parties and federations intending to enter in coalition to take part jointly at an election were required to inform the relevant Electoral Commission within ten days of the election being called.

=== Election date ===
The term of the General Deputation of La Rioja expired four years after the date of its previous election. Elections to the General Deputation were fixed for the fourth Sunday of May every four years. The previous election was held on 26 May 1991, setting the election date for the General Deputation on 28 May 1995.

The General Deputation of La Rioja could not be dissolved before the expiration date of parliament except in the event of an investiture process failing to elect a regional President within a two-month period from the first ballot. In such a case, the General Deputation was to be automatically dissolved and a snap election called, with elected lawmakers serving the remainder of its original four-year term.

== Opinion polls ==
The table below lists voting intention estimates in reverse chronological order, showing the most recent first and using the dates when the survey fieldwork was done, as opposed to the date of publication. Where the fieldwork dates are unknown, the date of publication is given instead. The highest percentage figure in each polling survey is displayed with its background shaded in the leading party's colour. If a tie ensues, this is applied to the figures with the highest percentages. The "Lead" column on the right shows the percentage-point difference between the parties with the highest percentages in a poll. When available, seat projections determined by the polling organisations are displayed below (or in place of) the percentages in a smaller font; 17 seats were required for an absolute majority in the General Deputation of La Rioja.

Color key:

Exit poll

| Polling firm/Commissioner | Fieldwork date | Sample size | Turnout | PSOE | PP | PR | IU | Lead |
|---|---|---|---|---|---|---|---|---|
| 1995 regional election | 28 May 1995 | —N/a | 76.2 | 34.1; 12 | 49.4; 17 | 6.7; 2 | 7.2; 2 | 15.3 |
| Eco Consulting/RTVE | 28 May 1995 | ? | ? | 29.2; 9/11 | 51.0; 17/19 | 8.3; 2/3 | 8.3; 2/3 | 21.8 |
| Demoscopia/El País | 10–15 May 1995 | 1,600 | ? | 28.3; 9 | 56.0; 19 | 6.2; 2 | 9.0; 3 | 27.7 |
| CIS | 24 Apr–10 May 1995 | 499 | 71.1 | 30.3 | 54.4 | 7.0 | 7.4 | 24.1 |
| 1994 EP election | 12 Jun 1994 | —N/a | 62.0 | 30.1 (11) | 53.1 (19) | – | 10.8 (3) | 23.0 |
| 1993 general election | 6 Jun 1993 | —N/a | 80.0 | 37.6 (14) | 46.3 (17) | 4.4 (0) | 7.0 (2) | 8.7 |
| 1991 regional election | 26 May 1991 | —N/a | 68.9 | 42.4; 16 | 41.7; 15 | 5.4; 2 | 4.5; 0 | 0.7 |

== Results ==
← Summary of the 28 May 1995 General Deputation of La Rioja election results →
| Parties and alliances | Popular vote | | | Seats | |
| Parties and alliances | Votes | % | ±pp | Total | +/− |
|---|---|---|---|---|---|
| People's Party (PP) | 81,703 | 49.44 | +7.74 | 17 | +2 |
| Spanish Socialist Workers' Party (PSOE) | 56,335 | 34.09 | −8.28 | 12 | −4 |
| United Left of La Rioja (IU) | 11,921 | 7.21 | +2.68 | 2 | +2 |
| Riojan Party (PR) | 11,069 | 6.70 | +1.32 | 2 | ±0 |
| Riojan Alternative (AR) | 1,368 | 0.83 | New | 0 | ±0 |
| Blank ballots | 2,856 | 1.73 | +0.08 | | |
| Total | 165,252 | | | 33 | ±0 |
| Valid votes | 165,252 | 99.30 | +0.08 | | |
| Invalid votes | 1,170 | 0.70 | −0.08 | | |
| Votes cast / turnout | 166,422 | 76.16 | +7.27 | | |
| Abstentions | 52,097 | 23.84 | −7.27 | | |
| Registered voters | 218,519 | | | | |

Popular vote
| PP | 49.44% |
| PSOE | 34.09% |
| IU | 7.21% |
| PR | 6.70% |
| Others | 0.83% |
| Blank ballots | 1.73% |

Seats
| PP | 51.51% |
| PSOE | 36.36% |
| IU | 6.06% |
| PR | 6.06% |

== Aftermath ==
Investiture; Pedro Sanz (PP)
| Ballot → | 30 June 1995 |
| Required majority → | 17 out of 33 |
| Yes: • PP (17) | 17 / 33 |
| No: • PSOE (12); • IU (2) | 14 / 33 |
| Abstentions: • PR (2) | 2 / 33 |
| Absentees | 0 / 33 |
