= Miguel González de Legarra =

Spanish politician

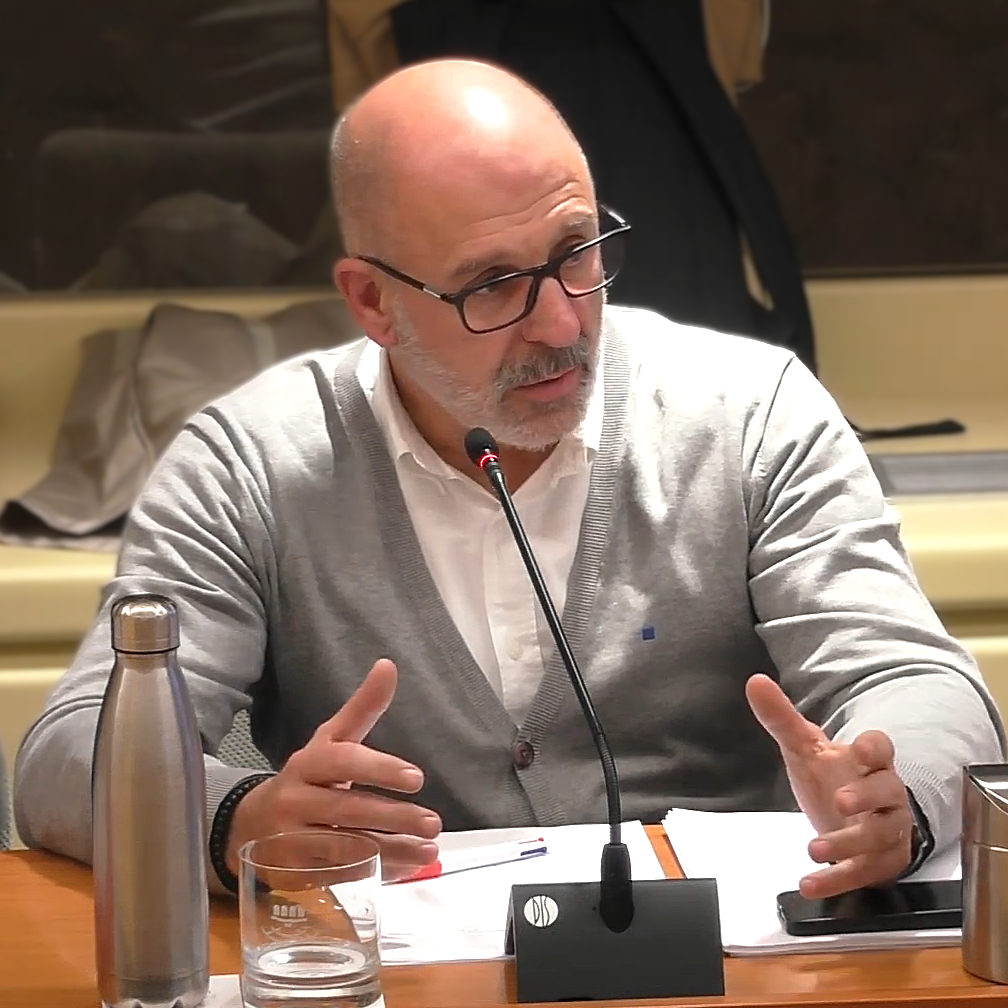

Miguel María González de Legarra (born 23 August 1962), also known under the first name Mikel, is a Spanish politician. As a member of the Riojan Party (PR+), he sat in the Parliament of La Rioja from 1991 to 2015. He left the party in 2017 and was elected back to parliament in 2023 as a member of the Spanish Socialist Workers' Party (PSOE).

== Biography ==
González de Legarra was born in Logroño in La Rioja. He began his activism in the youth wing of the Union of the Democratic Centre (UCD) before participating in the foundation of the Riojan Party (PR+) in 1982; he was made president of the youth wing of the latter.

González de Legarra was elected to the Parliament of La Rioja in 1991, and in 1995 he became the president of PR+. He maintained the party at two out of 33 seats until the 2015 Riojan regional election, when they lost both their seats; he then declined to present a candidacy at their 14th congress in July. He left the party in 2017, though this was not publicised until 2023.

González de Legarra made a return to politics when he was added to the Spanish Socialist Workers' Party (PSOE) list of incumbent President of La Rioja Concha Andreu in 2023. He said that there was a need to united progressive voices against the far right. He was placed 10th on their regional list, and was elected as they won 12 seats; the People's Party (PP) led by Gonzalo Capellán took the absolute majority of 17.
