= Marta Fernández Cornago =

Spanish politician (born 1993)

President of the Parliament of La Rioja
- Incumbent
- Assumed office 22 June 2023
- Preceded by: Jesús María García

Personal details
- Born: 25 January 1993 (age 33)
- Party: People's Party (since 2011)

Marta Fernández Cornago (born 25 January 1993) is a Spanish politician serving as a member of the Parliament of La Rioja since 2023. She has served as president of the parliament since 2023.
