= José Luis Pérez Pastor =

Spanish politician (born 1978)

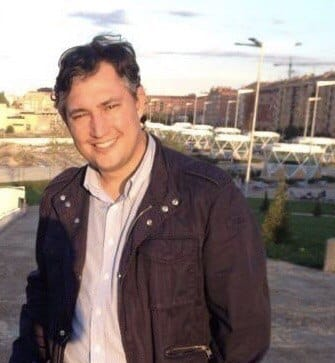
- Pérez in 2020

Member of the Senate
- In office 13 January 2016 – 21 May 2019
- Constituency: La Rioja

Personal details
- Born: 22 December 1978 (age 47)
- Party: People's Party

José Luis Pérez Pastor (born 22 December 1978) is a Spanish politician serving as minister of culture, tourism, sports and youth of La Rioja since 2023. From 2016 to 2019, he was a member of the Senate.
