= President of La Rioja =

Spanish community head of government

- Flag of La Rioja

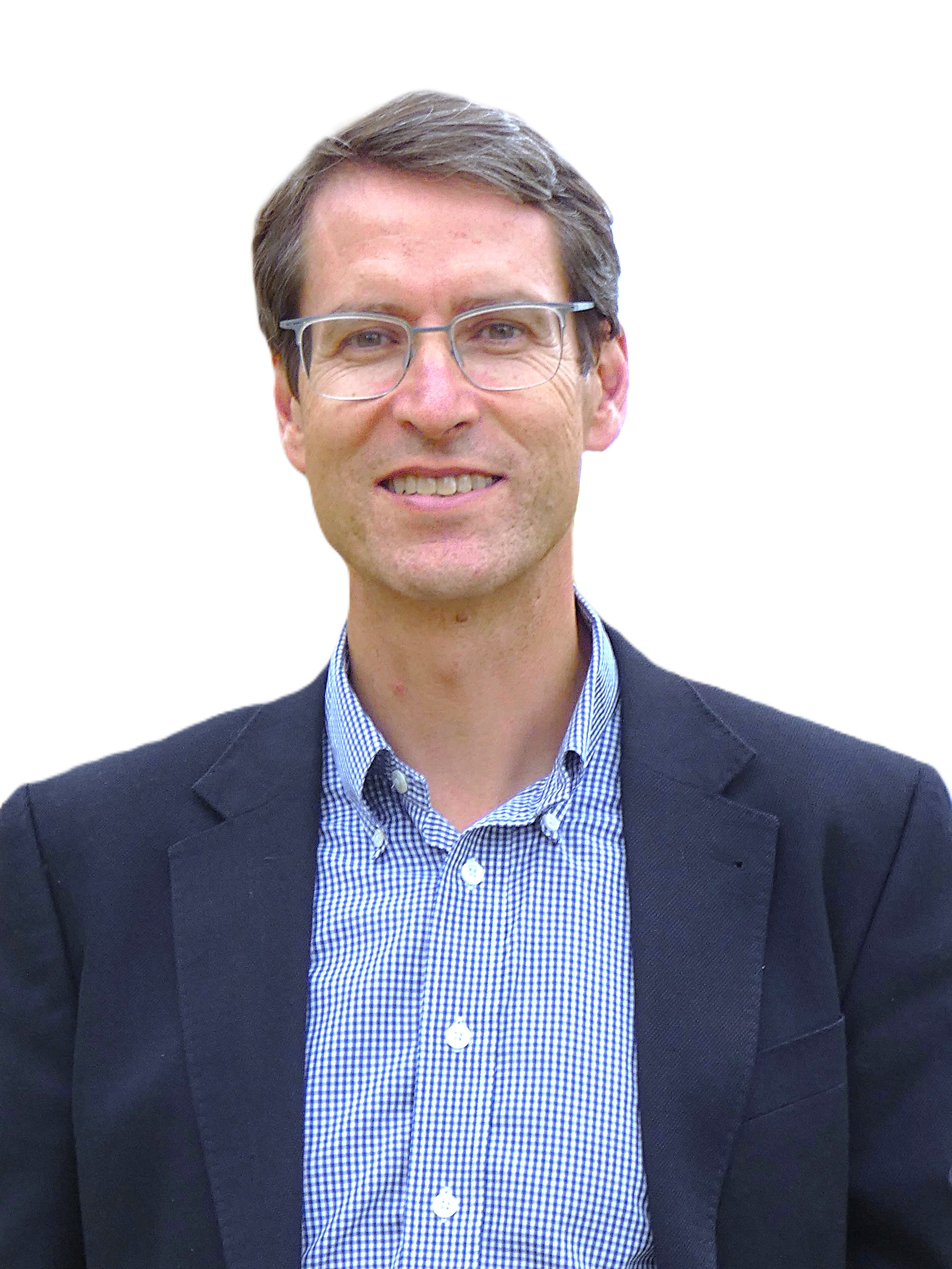
- Incumbent; Gonzalo Capellán since 29 June 2023
- Nominator: Parliament of La Rioja
- Appointer: The Monarch countersigned by the Prime Minister
- Inaugural holder: Luis Javier Rodríguez Moroy
- Formation: 27 August 1982

The president of La Rioja is the head of government of the Spanish autonomous community of La Rioja. The current incumbent is Gonzalo Capellán of the PP, who has held the office since 29 June 2023.

== List of presidents (1982–present) ==
Portrait	Name (Birth–Death)	Term of office			Party	Government Composition	Election	Monarch (Reign)	Ref.
Portrait	Name (Birth–Death)	Took office	Left office	Duration	Party	Government Composition	Election	Monarch (Reign)	Ref.
	Luis Javier Rodríguez Moroy (born 1944)	27 August 1982	28 January 1983	154 days	Independent		N/A	King; Juan Carlos I (1975–2014)	
	Luis Javier Rodríguez Moroy (born 1944)	27 August 1982	28 January 1983	154 days	PRP		N/A	King; Juan Carlos I (1975–2014)	
	Antonio Rodríguez Basulto (born 1945)	28 January 1983	3 June 1983	126 days	PSOE		N/A	King; Juan Carlos I (1975–2014)	
	José María de Miguel (born 1950)	3 June 1983	29 July 1987	4 years and 56 days	PSOE	de Miguel; PSOE	1983	King; Juan Carlos I (1975–2014)	
	Joaquín Espert (1938–2023)	29 July 1987	8 January 1990 (censured)	2 years and 163 days	AP	Espert; AP–PRP until Jan 1989; PP from Jan 1989	1987	King; Juan Carlos I (1975–2014)	
	Joaquín Espert (1938–2023)	29 July 1987	8 January 1990 (censured)	2 years and 163 days	PP	Espert; AP–PRP until Jan 1989; PP from Jan 1989	1987	King; Juan Carlos I (1975–2014)	
	José Ignacio Pérez Sáenz (born 1951)	10 January 1990	4 July 1991	5 years and 177 days	PSOE	Pérez Sáenz I PSOE–PRP	1987	King; Juan Carlos I (1975–2014)	
	José Ignacio Pérez Sáenz (born 1951)	4 July 1991	6 July 1995	5 years and 177 days	PSOE	Pérez Sáenz II; PSOE–PR	1991	King; Juan Carlos I (1975–2014)	
	Pedro Sanz (born 1953)	6 July 1995	13 July 1999	20 years and 1 day	PP	Sanz I PP	1995	King; Juan Carlos I (1975–2014)	
	Pedro Sanz (born 1953)	13 July 1999	1 July 2003	20 years and 1 day	PP	Sanz II; PP	1999	King; Juan Carlos I (1975–2014)	
	Pedro Sanz (born 1953)	1 July 2003	30 June 2007	20 years and 1 day	PP	Sanz III; PP	2003	King; Juan Carlos I (1975–2014)	
	Pedro Sanz (born 1953)	30 June 2007	25 June 2011	20 years and 1 day	PP	Sanz IV; PP	2007	King; Juan Carlos I (1975–2014)	
	Pedro Sanz (born 1953)	25 June 2011	7 July 2015	20 years and 1 day	PP	Sanz V PP	2011	King; Felipe VI (2014–present)	
	José Ignacio Ceniceros (born 1956)	7 July 2015	29 August 2019	4 years and 53 days	PP	Ceniceros; PP	2015	King; Felipe VI (2014–present)	
	Concha Andreu (born 1967)	29 August 2019	29 June 2023	3 years and 304 days	PSOE	Andreu; PSOE–Podemos	2019	King; Felipe VI (2014–present)	
	Gonzalo Capellán (born 1972)	29 June 2023	Incumbent	3 years and 70 days	PP	Capellán; PP	2023	King; Felipe VI (2014–present)	
