= Socialist Party of La Rioja =

Socialist Party of La Rioja Partido Socialista de La Rioja
- President: José Ignacio Pérez Sáenz
- Secretary-General: Francisco Ocón
- Headquarters: Calle Francisco Martínez Zaporta, 7, 26001 Logroño, La Rioja
- Youth wing: Socialist Youth of La Rioja
- Membership (2017): 1,151
- Ideology: Social democracy
- Political position: Centre-left
- National affiliation: Spanish Socialist Workers' Party
- Congress of Deputies: 2 / 4 (Riojan seats)
- Spanish Senate: 3 / 5 (Riojan seats)
- Parliament of La Rioja: 15 / 33
- Mayors (2015-2019): 45 / 174
- Local seats (2015-2019): 337 / 1,046

Website
- www.psoelarioja.es

The Socialist Party of La Rioja (Spanish: Partido Socialista de La Rioja, PSOE La Rioja) is the Riojan of the Spanish Socialist Workers' Party (PSOE), the main centre-left party in Spain since the 1970s.

== Electoral performance ==
=== Parliament of La Rioja ===
Parliament of La Rioja
Election	Votes	%	#	Seats	+/–	Leading candidate	Status
1983	63,848	47.17%	1st	18 / 35	—	José María de Miguel	Government
1987	57,178	39.64%	1st	14 / 33	4	Alicia Izaguirre	Opposition (1987–90)
1987	57,178	39.64%	1st	14 / 33	4	Alicia Izaguirre	Coalition (1990–91)
1991	60,843	42.37%	1st	16 / 33	2	José Ignacio Pérez Sáenz	Coalition
1995	56,335	34.09%	2nd	12 / 33	4	José Ignacio Pérez Sáenz	Opposition
1999	55,126	35.28%	2nd	13 / 33	1	José Ignacio Pérez Sáenz	Opposition
2003	66,410	38.18%	2nd	14 / 33	1	Francisco Martínez-Aldama	Opposition
2007	69,858	40.41%	2nd	14 / 33	0	Francisco Martínez-Aldama	Opposition
2011	50,169	30.33%	2nd	11 / 33	3	Francisco Martínez-Aldama	Opposition
2015	43,689	26.74%	2nd	10 / 33	1	Concha Andreu	Opposition
2019	63,068	38.67%	1st	15 / 33	5	Concha Andreu	Coalition
2023	53,562	31.90%	2nd	12 / 33	3	Concha Andreu	Opposition

=== Cortes Generales ===
Cortes Generales
Election	La Rioja						
Election	Congress					Senate	
Election	Votes	%	#	Seats	+/–	Seats	+/–
1977	36,186	26.29%	2nd	1 / 4	—	0 / 4	—
1979	39,245	29.13%	2nd	1 / 4	0	1 / 4	1
1982	67,781	43.45%	1st	2 / 4	1	3 / 4	2
1986	65,151	43.92%	1st	2 / 4	0	3 / 4	0
1989	58,678	39.70%	2nd	2 / 4	0	1 / 4	2
1993	64,037	37.60%	2nd	2 / 4	0	1 / 4	0
1996	65,311	36.65%	2nd	2 / 4	0	1 / 4	0
2000	59,171	34.87%	2nd	1 / 4	1	1 / 4	0
2004	81,390	43.97%	2nd	2 / 4	1	1 / 4	0
2008	82,032	43.63%	2nd	2 / 4	0	1 / 4	0
2011	54,066	31.09%	2nd	1 / 4	1	1 / 4	0
2015	41,973	23.69%	2nd	1 / 4	0	1 / 4	0
2016	42,010	24.29%	2nd	1 / 4	0	1 / 4	0
2019 (Apr)	57,307	31.69%	1st	2 / 4	1	3 / 4	2
2019 (Nov)	57,485	34.85%	1st	2 / 4	0	2 / 4	1

=== European Parliament ===
European Parliament
Election	La Rioja		
Election	Votes	%	#
1987	57,439	39.96%	1st
1989	45,965	38.67%	1st
1994	39,430	30.13%	2nd
1999	57,192	36.81%	2nd
2004	55,410	43.85%	2nd
2009	48,898	40.56%	2nd
2014	27,166	23.69%	2nd
2019	60,229	37.37%	1st
