= Riojan Party =

Riojan Party Partido Riojano
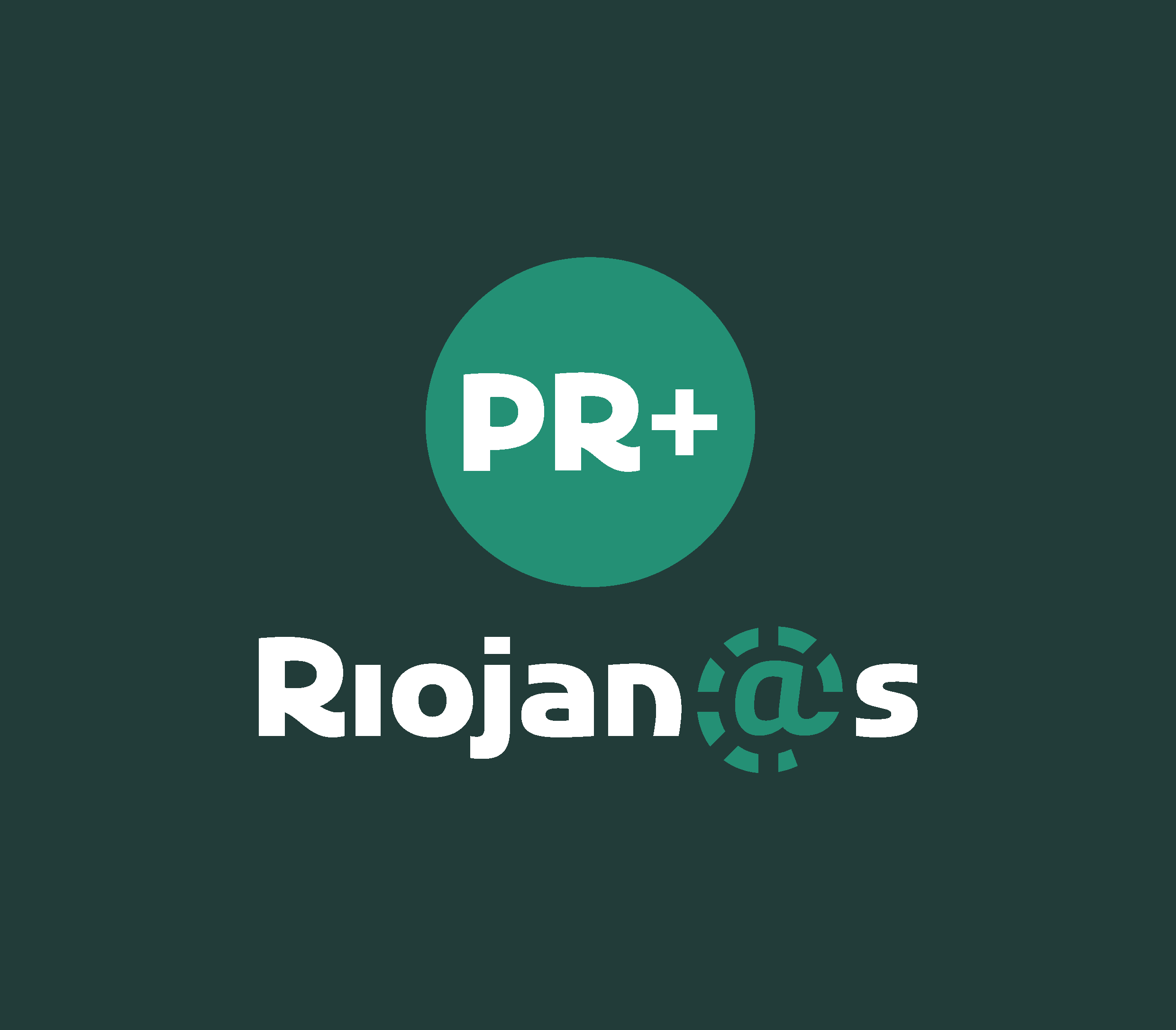
- President: Rita Beltrán
- Secretary-General: Iván Herrero
- Founded: 1982
- Split from: Union of the Democratic Centre
- Headquarters: Calle de los Portales, 17, 26001 Logroño, La Rioja
- Youth wing: Riojan Youth
- Ideology: Progressivism; Riojan regionalism Federalism
- Political position: Centre
- Colours: Teal; Green (customary)
- Parliament of La Rioja: 0 / 33
- Mayors (2023-2027): 1 / 174
- Local Government (2023-2027): 16 / 1,029

Website
- www.partidoriojano.es

The Riojan Party (Spanish: Partido Riojano; now rebranded as PR+ Riojan@s) is a Spanish regionalist political party operating in the autonomous community of La Rioja. The party was formed as the Progressive Riojan Party (Spanish: Partido Riojano Progresista) on 6 December 1982 with the stated aim of occupying the progressive centre in La Rioja.

== History ==
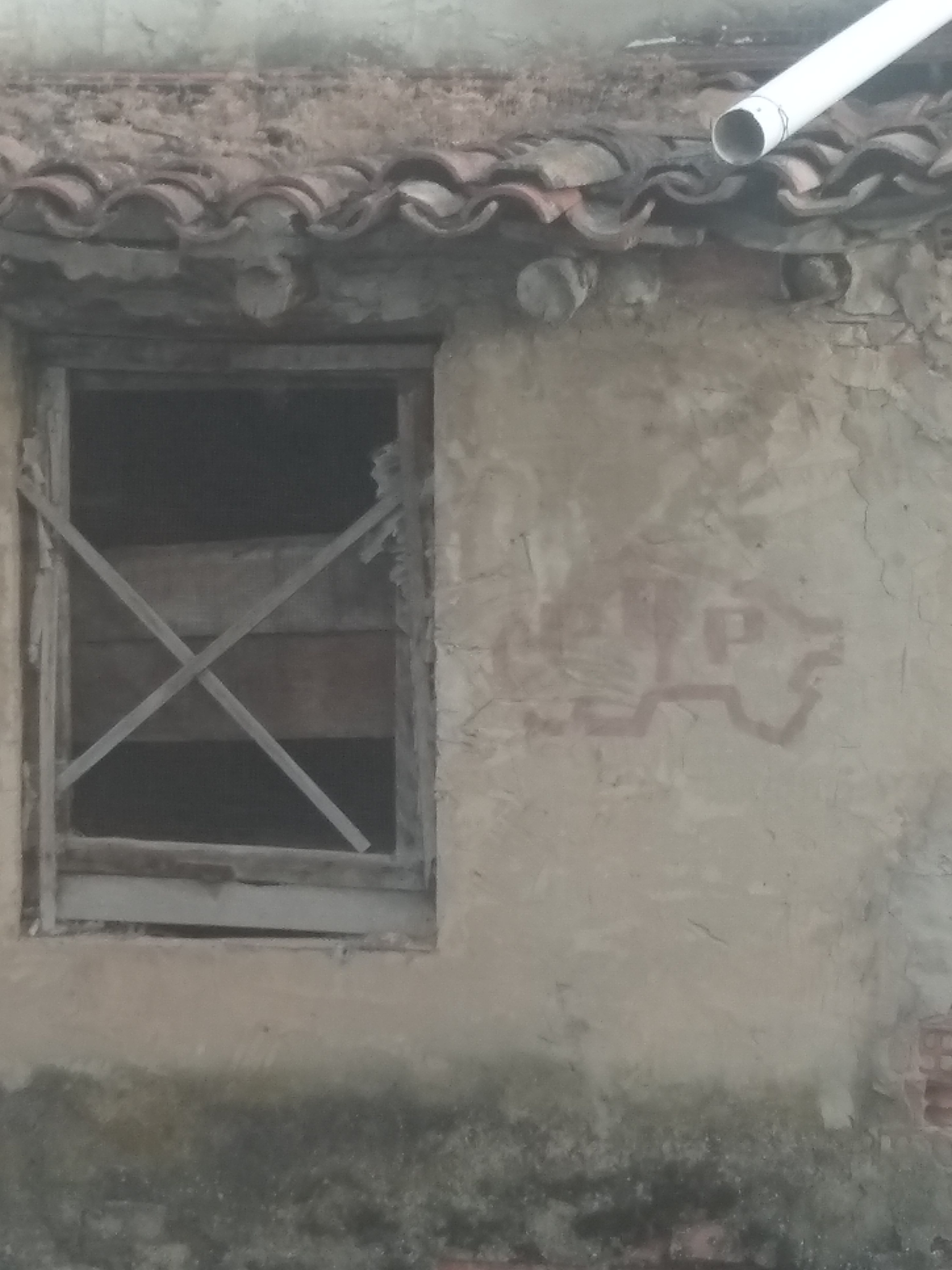
Graffiti in Nalda of the old Progressive Riojan Party (PRP) logo.

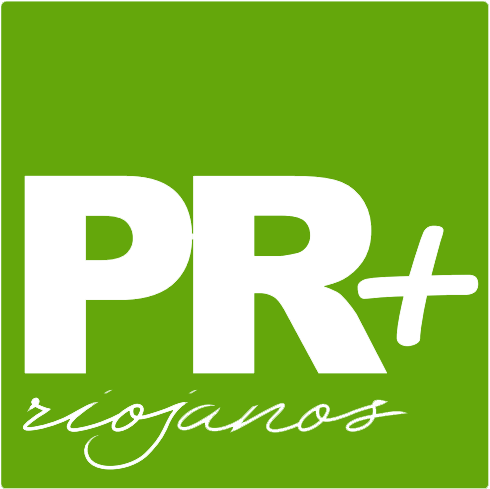
Old PR+ logo (before 2025).

Initially the party was led by Luis Javier Rodriguez Moroy, a former MP in the Spanish Congress of Deputies. Like Rodriguez, many members of the new party came from the Union of the Democratic Centre (UCD), the former governing coalition of Spain which disbanded in February 1983. Rubén García Marañón succeeded Rodriguez as Party President in February 1984 and the party adopted its current name in 1991.

In elections to the Parliament of La Rioja, held every four years from 1983 onwards, the party has usually polled between 6% and 7% and won two deputies out of the thirty three seats available at each election, with Miguel González de Legarra amongt them, until 2015 when it lost its seats. In elections to the Spanish Congress, the party's highest share was 4.4% in the 1993 election.

In the 2007 local elections, the party polled 6.6% and won 43 council seats, down from the 65 seats and 7.5% that it had polled in 2003.

=== Presidency of Rubén Antoñanzas (2017–2025) ===
In June 2017, Rubén Antoñanzas, the party's only representative on Logroño City Council, was elected party president with 90.9% of the vote, while Julio Revuelta became secretary general. In the 2019 local elections, he kept his seat, and supported Pablo Hermoso de Mendoza González of the Spanish Socialist Workers' Party as mayor, subsequently being put in charge of sports in the local administration. In the concurrent regional election, Antoñanzas declined to lead the party's nomination, with Revuelta running instead and winning no seats.

Antoñanzas ran unopposed and was re-elected party president in December 2022. For the 2023 Riojan regional election, he formed a pact with Empty Spain, in which their leader Inmaculada Sáenz would lead the list and he was in second. Dissenting members of the Riojan Party left and formed a new party with former members of the People's Party, naming it Por La Rioja (PLRi). Neither the Riojan Party nor Por La Rioja won a seat in the Parliament of La Rioja. Pablo Álvarez of regional newspaper La Rioja wrote that three parties – also including Vinea – were competing for the same political space as conservative regionalists, while that space that was becoming smaller due to polarisation around the country.

=== Presidency of Rita Beltrán (2025–present) ===
Antoñanzas resigned as president of the Riojan Party in July 2025, five months before the next party congress, and named Arnedo councillor Rita Beltrán as acting president. He said that two terms were enough and that parties should change leaders. In December, the congress named Beltrán as the new president, the first woman in the role; she called for a merger with Vinea.

In January 2026, the party rebranded as PR+Riojan@s, with a new logo using the shade of green associated with the party in the 1990s, and the "@" being composed of seven dashes to represent the seven valleys of the region. On 9 February, Vinea was absorbed into the party.

== Election results ==
=== Local councils ===
Municipal elections
Election	La Rioja			
Election	Votes	%	Seats won (local councils)	Mayors elected
2023	6,297	3.8	16 / 1,037	1 / 174
2019	8,373	5.1	43 / 1,039	5 / 174
2015	9,704	5.9	61 / 1,029	9 / 174
2011	9,197	5.5	56 / 1,064	6 / 174
2007	11,085	6.4	43 / 966	7 / 174
2003	12,667	7.3	65 / 948	9 / 174
1999	9,669	6.2	58 / 953	10 / 174
1995	11,842	7.2	103 / 982	19 / 174
1991	8,461	5.9	82 / 984	25 / 174
1987	7,125	5.0	51 / 941	11 / 174
1983	9,026	6.8	98 / 1,134	19 / 163

=== Regional elections ===
Parliament of La Rioja
Election	Votes	%	Seats	+/–	Leading candidate	Government
1983	10,102	7.46 (#3)	2 / 35	—	Luis Javier Rodríguez Moroy	Opposition
1987	9,212	6.39 (#4)	2 / 33	0	Luis Javier Rodríguez Moroy	Opposition (1987–1989)
1987	9,212	6.39 (#4)	2 / 33	0	Luis Javier Rodríguez Moroy	Coalition (1989–1991)
1991	7,731	5.38 (#3)	2 / 33	0	Leopoldo Virosta	Coalition
1995	11,069	6.70 (#4)	2 / 33	0	Leopoldo Virosta	Opposition
1999	9,004	5.76 (#3)	2 / 33	0	Miguel González de Legarra	Opposition
2003	11,842	6.81 (#3)	2 / 33	0	Miguel González de Legarra	Opposition
2007	10,369	6.00 (#3)	2 / 33	0	Miguel González de Legarra	Opposition
2011	8,983	5.43 (#3)	2 / 33	0	Miguel González de Legarra	Opposition
2015	7,277	4.45 (#5)	0 / 33	2	Miguel González de Legarra	No seats
2019	7,512	4.61 (#5)	0 / 33	0	Julio Revuelta	No seats
2023	6,016	3.58 (#5)	0 / 33	0	Inmaculada Sáenz (Empty Spain)	No seats
