= People's Party of La Rioja =

People's Party of La Rioja Partido Popular de La Rioja
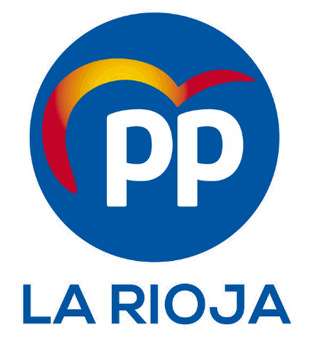
- President: José Ignacio Ceniceros
- Secretary-General: María Martín Díez de Baldeón
- Founded: 1989
- Headquarters: C/ Duquesa de la Victoria 3 Logroño, La Rioja
- Ideology: Liberal conservatism Christian democracy
- Political position: Centre-right to right-wing
- National affiliation: People's Party
- Parliament of La Rioja: 17 / 33
- Congress of Deputies (Riojan seats): 2 / 4
- Senate (Riojan seats): 2 / 5

Website
- www.pplarioja.es

The People's Party of La Rioja (Spanish: Partido Popular de La Rioja, PP) is the regional section of the People's Party of Spain (PP) in La Rioja. It was formed in 1989 from the re-foundation of the People's Alliance.

== Electoral performance ==
=== Parliament of La Rioja ===
Parliament of La Rioja
Election	Votes	%	#	Seats	+/–	Leading candidate	Status
1991	59,876	41.70%	2nd	15 / 33	2 (Note: Compared to People's Alliance totals in the 1987 regional election.)	Joaquín Espert	Opposition
1995	81,703	49.44%	1st	17 / 33	2	Pedro Sanz	Government
1999	80,088	51.26%	1st	18 / 33	1	Pedro Sanz	Government
2003	84,533	48.60%	1st	17 / 33	1	Pedro Sanz	Government
2007	84,382	48.81%	1st	17 / 33	0	Pedro Sanz	Government
2011	85,975	51.98%	1st	20 / 33	3	Pedro Sanz	Government
2015	63,094	38.62%	1st	15 / 33	5	Pedro Sanz	Government
2019	53,925	33.06%	2nd	12 / 33	3	José Ignacio Ceniceros	Opposition
2023	76,205	45.38%	1st	17 / 33	5	Gonzalo Capellán	Government

=== Cortes Generales ===
Cortes Generales
Election	La Rioja						
Election	Congress					Senate	
Election	Votes	%	#	Seats	+/–	Seats	+/–
1989	60,737	41.09%	1st	2 / 4	0	3 / 4	2
1993	78,792	46.26%	1st	2 / 4	0	3 / 4	0
1996	88,069	49.41%	1st	2 / 4	0	3 / 4	0
2000	91,810	54.10%	1st	3 / 4	1	3 / 4	0
2004	92,441	49.94%	1st	2 / 4	1	3 / 4	0
2008	93,104	49.51%	1st	2 / 4	0	3 / 4	0
2011	95,124	54.70%	1st	3 / 4	1	3 / 4	0
2015	67,941	38.34%	1st	2 / 4	1	3 / 4	0
2016	73,708	42.61%	1st	2 / 4	0	3 / 4	0
2019 (Apr)	47,947	26.51%	2nd	1 / 4	1	1 / 4	2
2019 (Nov)	56,450	34.23%	2nd	2 / 4	1	2 / 4	1

=== European Parliament ===
European Parliament
Election	La Rioja		
Election	Votes	%	#
1989	39,274	33.04%	2nd
1994	69,520	53.12%	1st
1999	83,196	53.55%	1st
2004	64,795	51.27%	1st
2009	61,098	50.67%	1st
2014	44,093	38.45%	1st
2019	50,124	31.10%	2nd
