= José Ignacio Pérez Sáenz =

Spanish politician

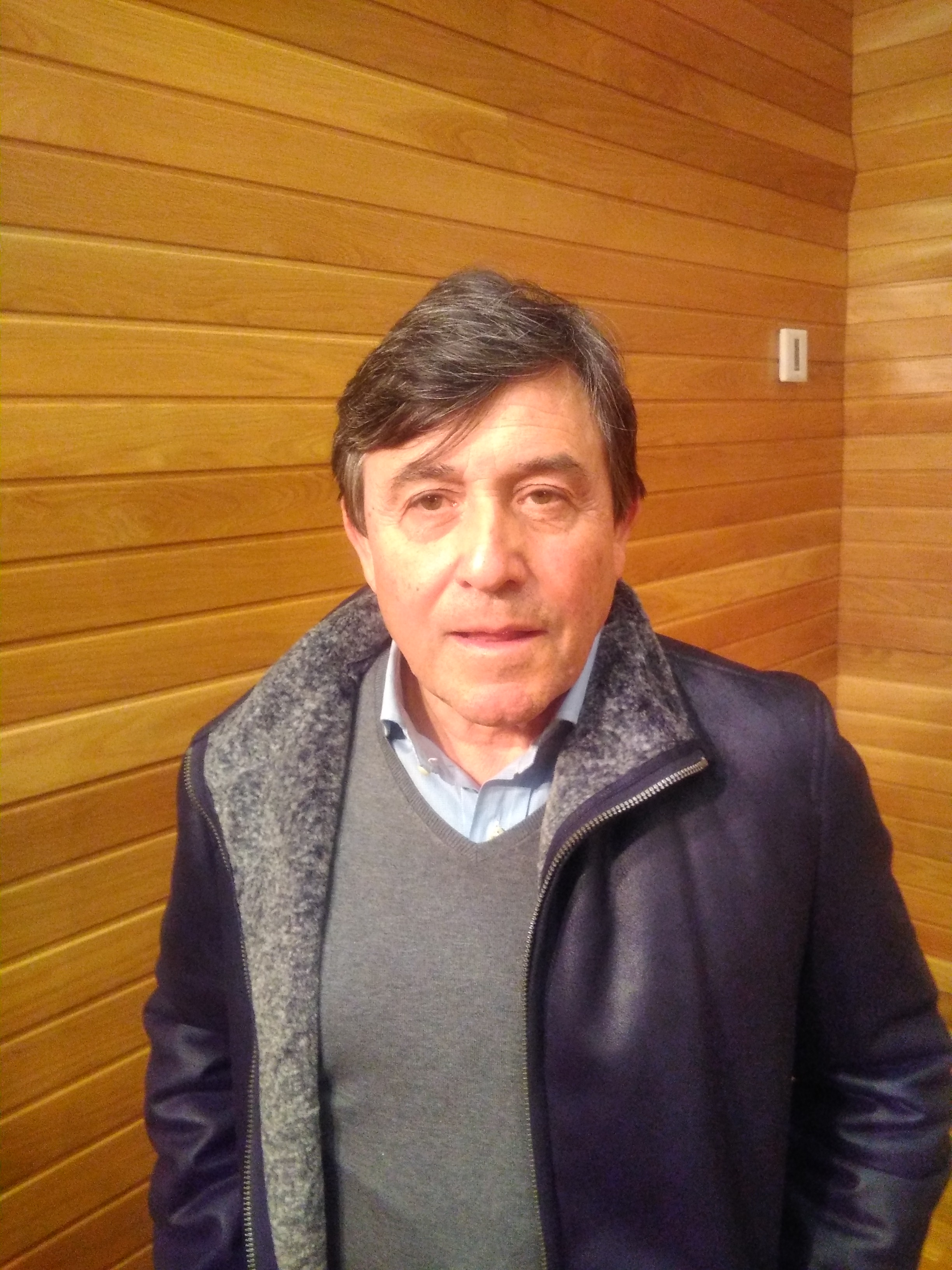

President of La Rioja
- In office 8 January 1990 – 30 June 1995
- Preceded by: Joaquín Espert
- Succeeded by: Pedro Sanz

Personal details
- Born: José Ignacio Pérez Sáenz; 7 November 1951 (age 74) Calahorra, La Rioja, Spain
- Party: Spanish Socialist Workers' Party

José Ignacio Pérez Sáenz (born 7 November 1951) is a Spanish politician and former President of La Rioja between 1990 and 1995.
