= Parliament of La Rioja =

Parliament of La Rioja Parlamento de La Rioja
- La Rioja unicameral legislature

Type
- Type: Spanish regional legislature
- Houses: Unicameral

Leadership
- President: Marta Fernández Cornago, PP since 22 June 2023
- Vice President: María Teresa Antoñanzas, PP since 22 June 2023
- Second Vice President: Jesús María García, PSOE since 22 June 2023

Structure
- Seats: 33
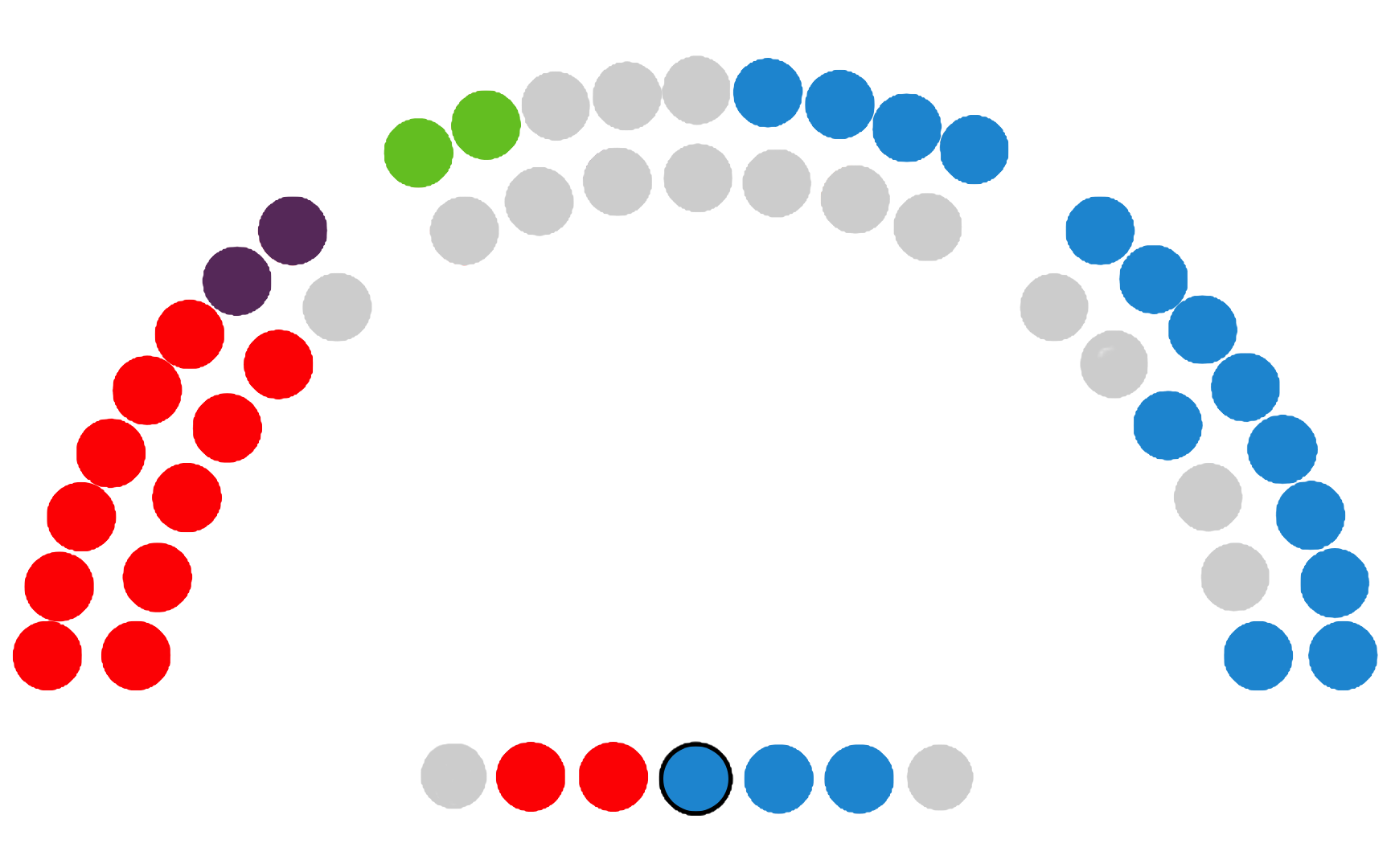
- Political groups: Government (17): PP (17); Opposition (16): PSOE (12); Vox (2); Podemos (1); IU (1)
- Length of term: 4 years

Elections
- Last election: 28 May 2023

Meeting place
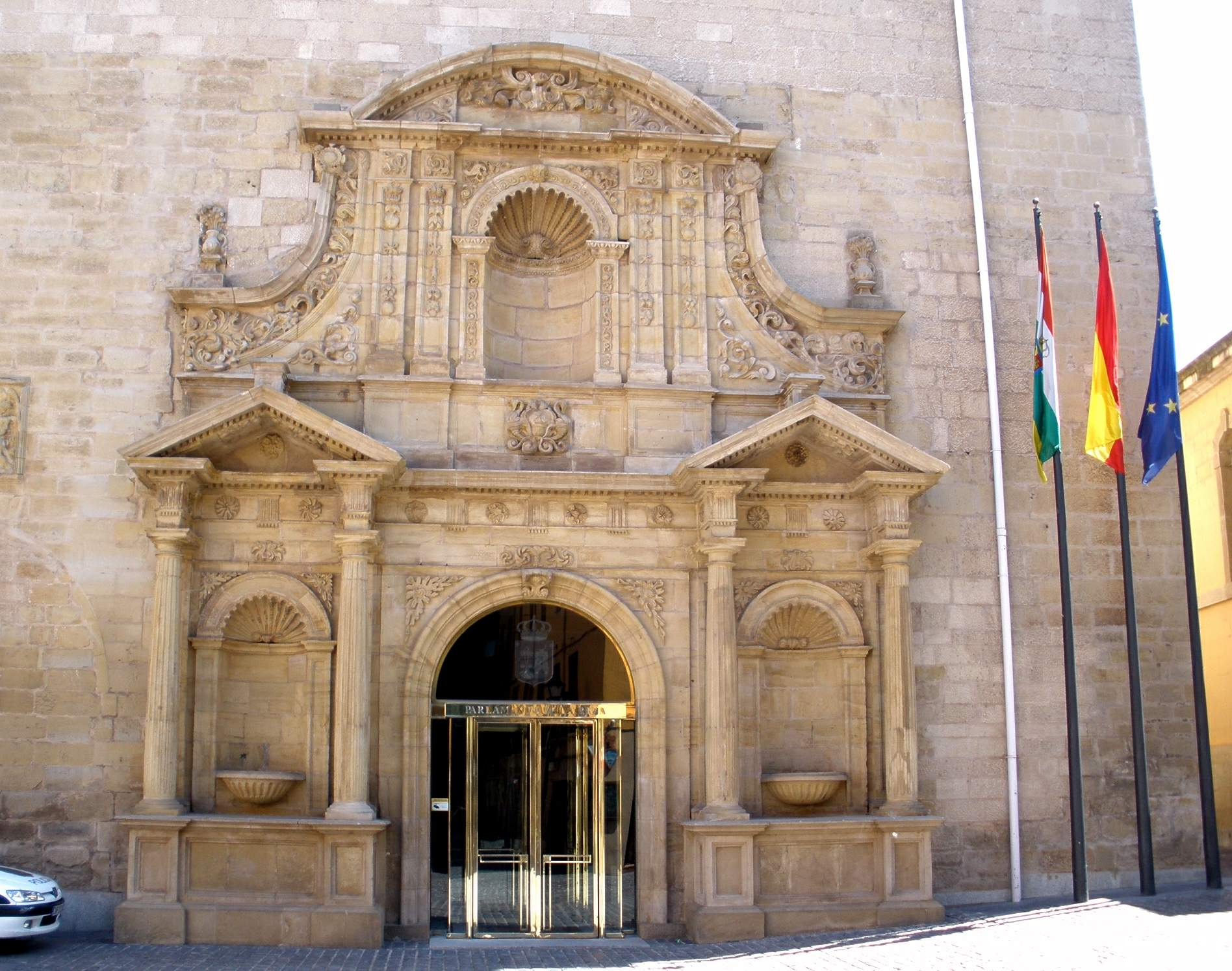
- The entrance to the Parliament of La Rioja, housed in the former Monastery of La Merced in Logroño.

The Parliament of La Rioja (Spanish: Parlamento de La Rioja) is the unicameral autonomous parliament of La Rioja, one of the autonomous communities of Spain. The parliament, composed of 33 elected seats, is located in the former Monastery of La Merced in Logroño, the capital city of La Rioja.

== Membership ==
=== Results of the elections to the Parliament of La Rioja ===
The representatives of the Parliament of La Rioja are elected every four years under a system of party-list proportional representation.

Deputies in Regional Assembly of Murcia since 1983
Key to parties Unidas Podemos Podemos IU PSOE Cs PRP CDS PP CP AP Vox
Election	Distribution	President
1983	18 / 2 / 15	José María de Miguel (PSOE)
1987	14 / 2 / 4 / 13	Joaquín Espert (AP)
1991	16 / 2 / 15	José Ignacio Pérez (PSOE)
1995	2 / 12 / 2 / 17	Pedro Sanz (PP)
1999	13 / 2 / 18	Pedro Sanz (PP)
2003	14 / 2 / 17	Pedro Sanz (PP)
2007	14 / 2 / 17	Pedro Sanz (PP)
2011	11 / 2 / 20	Pedro Sanz (PP)
2015	4 / 10 / 4 / 15	José Ignacio Ceniceros (PP)
2019	2 / 15 / 4 / 12	Concha Andreu (PSOE)
2023	2 / 12 / 17 / 2	Gonzalo Capellán (PP)

== See also ==
- List of presidents of the Parliament of La Rioja
