= Pedro Sanz =

Spanish politician

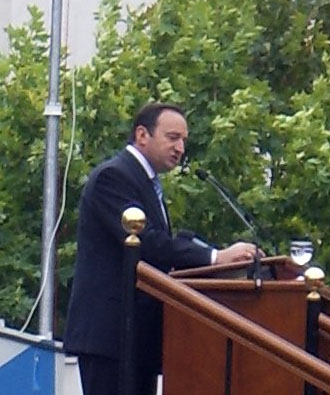
Pedro Sanz Alonso

Pedro Sanz Alonso (born Igea, La Rioja, 27 December 1953), is a Spanish politician, President of the autonomous community of La Rioja from 1995 to 2015 and member of the centre-right People's Party.

He was a school teacher in the neighbouring Basque Country until 1981. In 1990 he became Secretary of the People's Party in La Rioja until 1993 when he was elected regional president of the party.
