= 2027 Riojan regional election =

Election in the Spanish region of La Rioja

- 23 May 2027

All 33 seats in the Parliament of La Rioja 17 seats needed for a majority
- Opinion polls
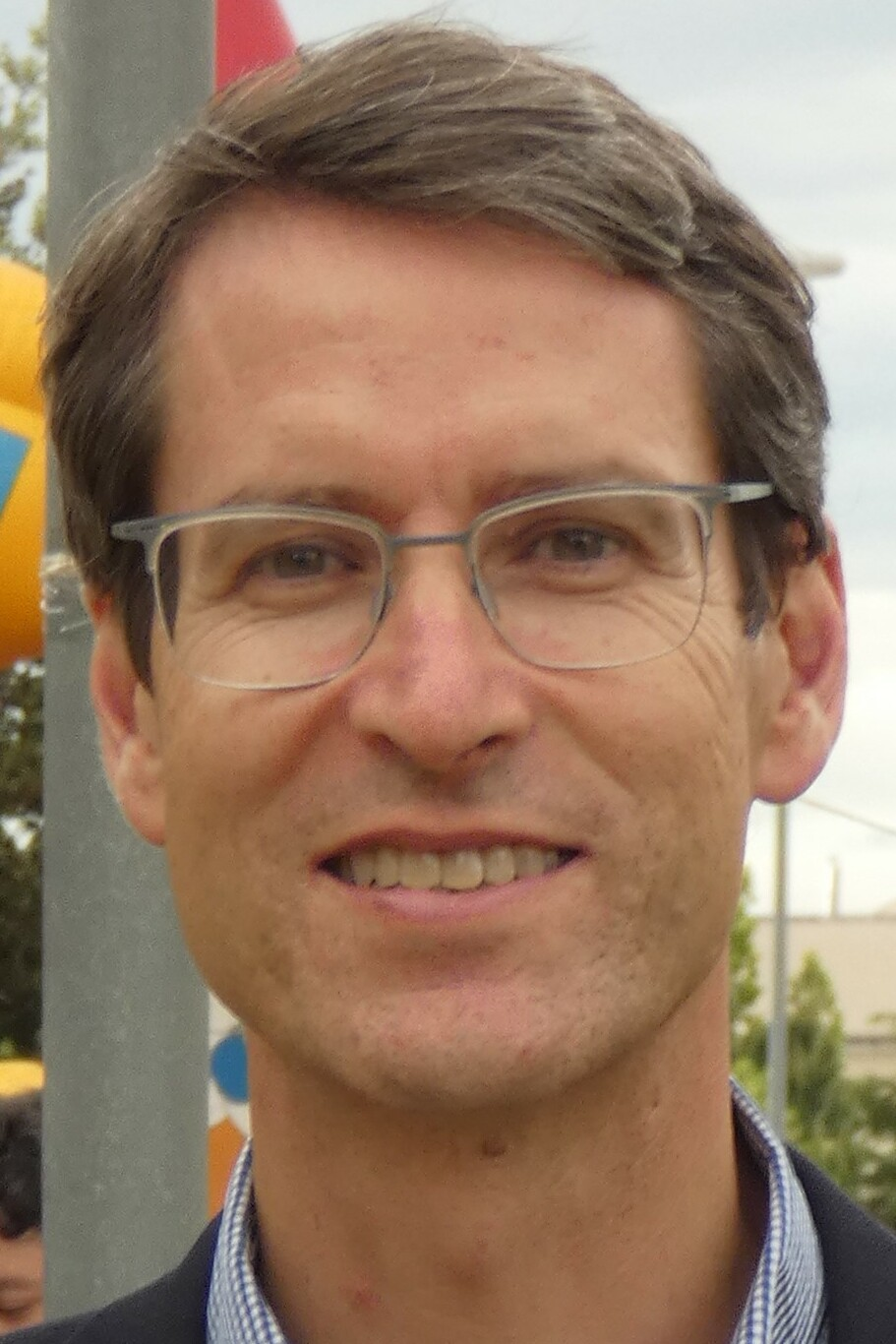

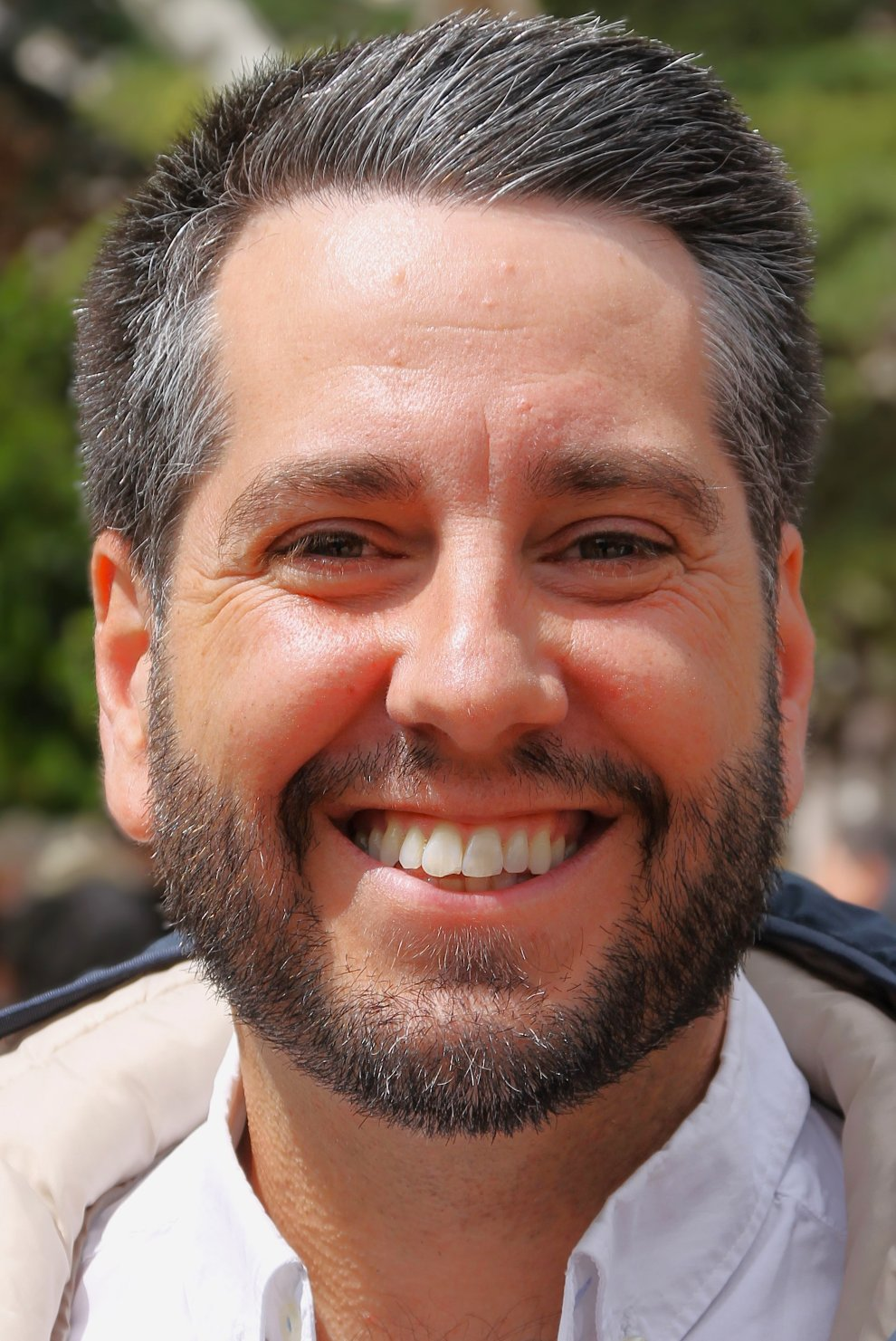

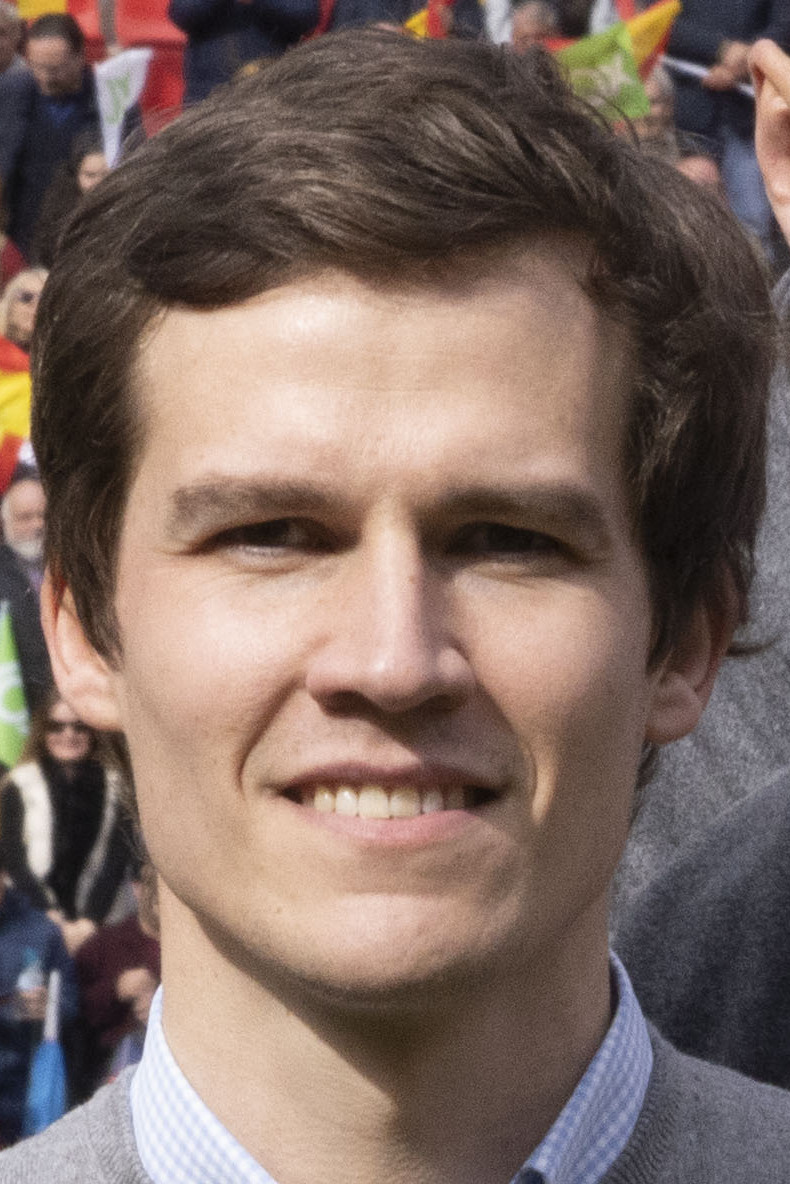

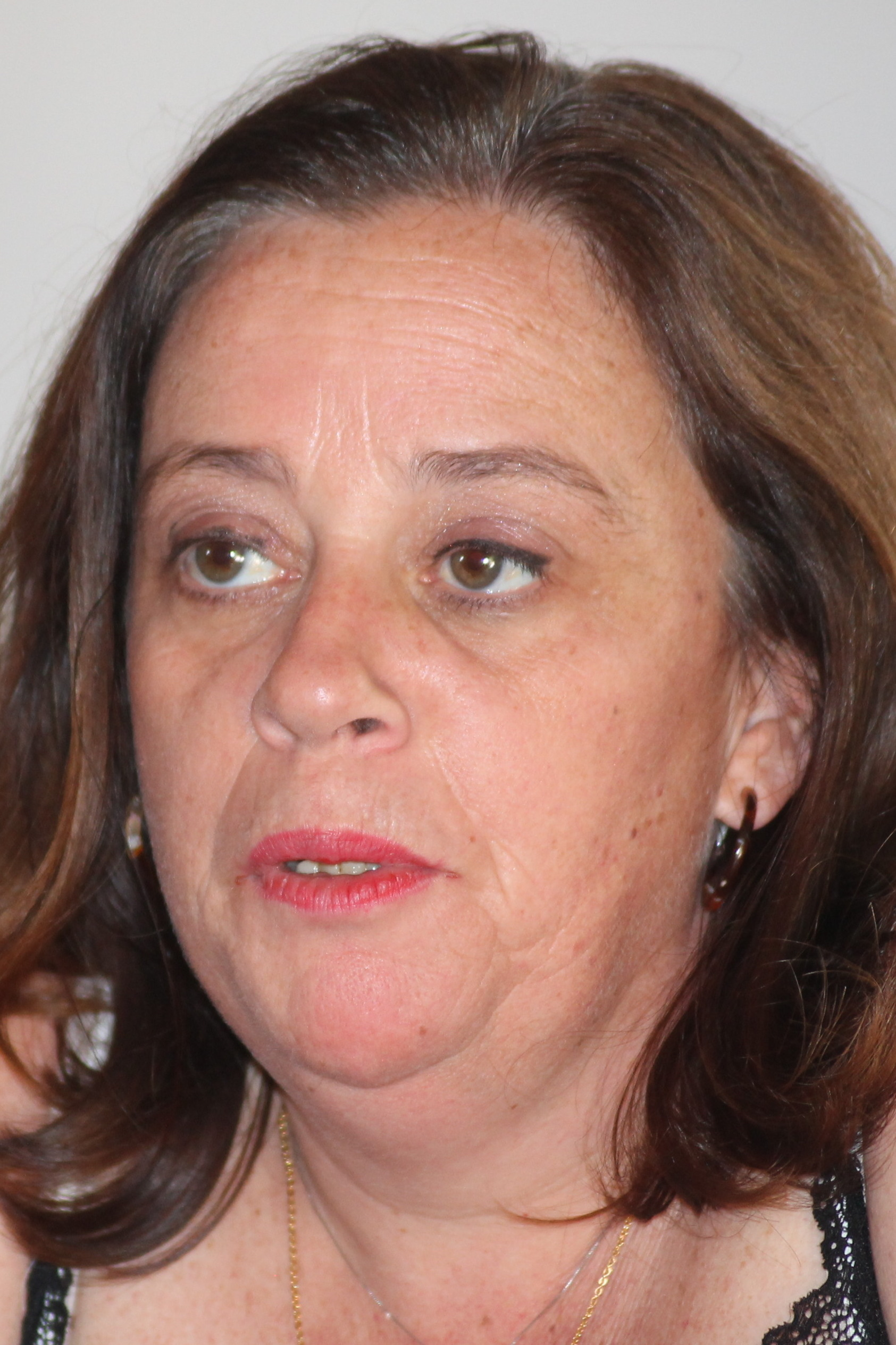
Leader	Gonzalo Capellán	Javier García	Ángel Alda
Party	PP	PSOE	Vox
Leader since	13 October 2022	16 December 2024	13 February 2023
Last election	17 seats, 45.4%	12 seats, 31.9%	2 seats, 7.6%
Current seats	17	12	2
Seats needed	In majority	▲5	▲15
Leader	Henar Moreno
Party	Podemos–IU
Leader since	5 April 2022
Last election	2 seats, 5.1%
Current seats	2
Seats needed	▲15
Incumbent President
Gonzalo Capellán
PP

A regional election will be held in La Rioja on 23 May 2027 to elect the 12th Parliament of the autonomous community. All 33 seats in the Parliament will be up for election. It will be held concurrently with regional elections in at least six other autonomous communities and local elections all across Spain.

== Overview ==
=== Electoral system ===
The Parliament of La Rioja is the devolved, unicameral legislature of the autonomous community of La Rioja, having legislative power in regional matters as defined by the Spanish Constitution and the Riojan Statute of Autonomy, as well as the ability to vote confidence in or withdraw it from a regional president. Voting for the Parliament is on the basis of universal suffrage, which comprises all nationals over 18 years of age, registered in La Rioja and in full enjoyment of their political rights.

The 33 members of the Parliament of La Rioja are elected using the D'Hondt method and a closed list proportional representation, with an electoral threshold of five percent of valid votes—which includes blank ballots—being applied regionally.

=== Election date ===
The term of the Parliament of La Rioja expires four years after the date of its previous election. Elections to the Parliament are fixed for the fourth Sunday of May every four years. The previous election was held on 28 May 2023, setting the election date for the Parliament on 23 May 2027.

The president has the prerogative to dissolve the Parliament of La Rioja and call a snap election, provided that no motion of no confidence is in process, no nationwide election is due and some time requirements are met: namely, that dissolution does not occur either during the first legislative session or within the legislature's last year ahead of its scheduled expiry, nor before one year has elapsed since a previous dissolution. In the event of an investiture process failing to elect a regional president within a two-month period from the first ballot, the Parliament shall be automatically dissolved and a fresh election called. Any snap election held as a result of these circumstances will not alter the period to the next ordinary election, with elected lawmakers serving the remainder of its original four-year term.

== Parties and candidates ==
The electoral law allows for parties and federations registered in the interior ministry, coalitions and groupings of electors to present lists of candidates. Parties and federations intending to form a coalition ahead of an election are required to inform the relevant Electoral Commission within ten days of the election call, whereas groupings of electors need to secure the signature of at least one percent of the electorate in La Rioja, disallowing electors from signing for more than one list of candidates.

Below is a list of the main parties and electoral alliances which will likely contest the election:

Candidacy	Parties and alliances	Leading candidate	Ideology	Previous result		Gov.	Ref.
Candidacy	Parties and alliances	Leading candidate	Ideology	Vote %	Seats	Gov.	Ref.
PP	List: People's Party (PP)	Gonzalo Capellán	Conservatism; Christian democracy	45.4%	17	Yes	
PSOE	List: Spanish Socialist Workers' Party (PSOE)	Javier García	Social democracy	31.9%	12	No	
Vox	List: Vox (Vox)	Ángel Alda	Right-wing populism Ultranationalism; National conservatism	7.6%	2	No	
Podemos–IU	List: We Can (Podemos); United Left (IU) – Communist Party of La Rioja (PCE–LR) – The Dawn Marxist Organization (La Aurora (OM)) – Republican Left (IR)	Henar Moreno	Left-wing populism Direct democracy Democratic socialism	5.1%	2	No	
PR+EV	List: Riojan Party (PR+); Empty Spain (EV)	Inmaculada Sáenz	Regionalism; Progressivism	3.6%	0	No	

== Opinion polls ==
The tables below list opinion polling results in reverse chronological order, showing the most recent first and using the dates when the survey fieldwork was done, as opposed to the date of publication. Where the fieldwork dates are unknown, the date of publication is given instead. The highest percentage figure in each polling survey is displayed with its background shaded in the leading party's colour. If a tie ensues, this is applied to the figures with the highest percentages. The "Lead" column on the right shows the percentage-point difference between the parties with the highest percentages in a poll.

=== Voting intention estimates ===
The table below lists weighted voting intention estimates. Refusals are generally excluded from the party vote percentages, while question wording and the treatment of "don't know" responses and those not intending to vote may vary between polling organisations. When available, seat projections determined by the polling organisations are displayed below (or in place of) the percentages in a smaller font; 17 seats are required for an absolute majority in the Parliament of La Rioja.

Polling firm/Commissioner	Fieldwork date	Sample size	Turnout	PP	PSOE	Vox	Podemos	PR+	Sumar	SALF	Lead
EM-Analytics/Electomanía	15 Aug–29 Sep 2026	1,235	?	43.4; 17	25.2; 9	19.2; 7	2.1; 0	2.2; 0	2.6; 0	–	18.2
Sigma Dos/El Mundo	28 May–4 Jun 2026	1,007	?	46.0; 16/17	26.9; 9/10	13.5; 4/5	6.8; 1/2	–	–	–	19.1
EM-Analytics/Electomanía	29 Jul–29 Aug 2025	1,235	?	44.7; 18	32.2; 12	8.5; 3	1.0; 0	3.8; 0	2.5; 0	–	12.5
NC Report/La Razón	16–31 May 2025	300	64.9	? 17	? 11	? 3	? 2	–	–	–	?
Sigma Dos/El Mundo	19–28 May 2025	1,051	?	46.8; 17/18	32.6; 11/12	10.1; 2/3	5.8; 1/2	2.4; 0	–	–	14.2
CIS (NueveCuatroUno) (Note: Alternative projection based on raw CIS data.)	7–31 Mar 2025	392	?	48.0; 18	34.0; 12	9.5; 3	2.7; 0	2.3; 0	–	–	14.0
2024 EP election	9 Jun 2024	—N/a	49.1	44.6 (17)	32.6 (13)	8.8 (3)	2.4 (0)	–	3.3 (0)	3.7 (0)	12.0
2023 general election	23 Jul 2023	—N/a	70.2	45.6 (16)	35.7 (12)	9.8 (3)	(Note: Within Sumar.)	–	6.6 (2)	–	9.9
2023 regional election	28 May 2023	—N/a	67.8	45.4; 17	31.9; 12	7.6; 2	5.1; 2	3.6; 0	–	–	13.5

=== Voting preferences ===
The table below lists raw, unweighted voting preferences.

Polling firm/Commissioner	Fieldwork date	Sample size	PP	PSOE	Vox	Podemos	PR+	Sumar	SALF	Question	X mark	Lead
CIS	7–31 Mar 2025	392	34.5	27.6	4.8	1.0	0.7	2.2	0.6	17.3	5.1	6.9
2024 EP election (Note: Does not include non-resident citizens.)	9 Jun 2024	—N/a	23.3	17.0	4.6	1.2	–	1.7	1.9	—N/a	47.5	6.3
2023 general election	23 Jul 2023	—N/a	33.8	26.4	7.2		–	4.8	–	—N/a	25.1	7.4
2023 regional election	28 May 2023	—N/a	32.4	22.8	5.4	3.6	2.6	–	–	—N/a	27.5	9.6

=== Preferred President ===
The table below lists opinion polling on leader preferences to become president of La Rioja.

Polling firm/Commissioner	Fieldwork date	Sample size					Other/ None/ Not care	Question	Lead
Polling firm/Commissioner	Fieldwork date	Sample size	Capellán PP	García PSOE	Alda Vox	Moreno IU	Other/ None/ Not care	Question	Lead
CIS (Note: Responses denoting a party's generic candidate are aggregated to that party's main candidate/leader at the time of the poll.)	7–31 Mar 2025	392	34.0	17.7	1.7	1.5	5.4	39.9	16.3
