= Henar Moreno =

Spanish politician

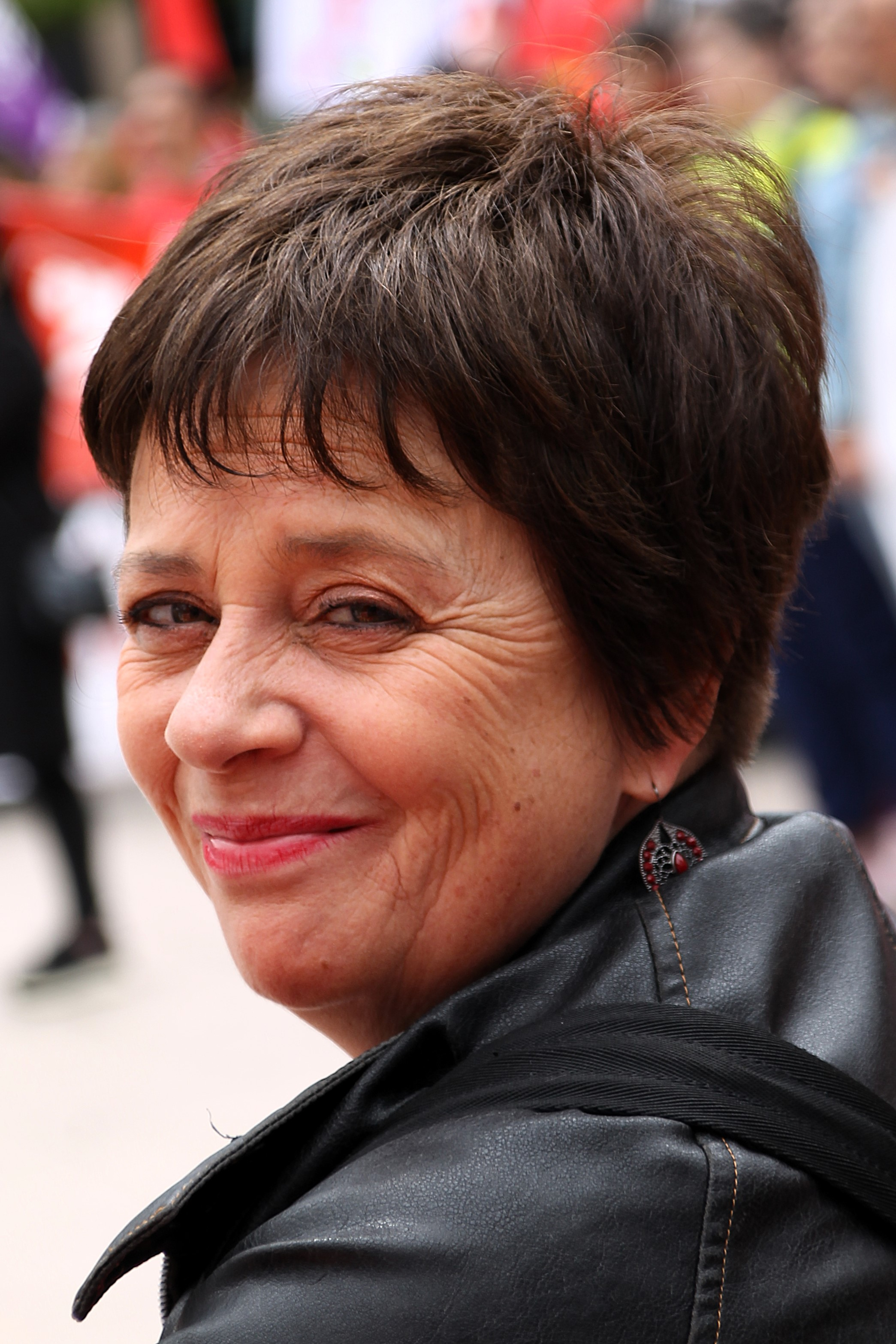

Henar Moreno Martínez (born 12 January 1973) is a Spanish politician of the United Left (IU). She was elected to the Parliament of La Rioja in 2019 on the leader of the IU-Podemos list, and was re-elected in 2023 as the list's leader.

== Biography ==
Born in Logroño in La Rioja, Moreno graduated in law, and began practising law in 1998, specialising in family mediation.

In 1991, she joined the Communist Party of Spain (PCE) and its formation the United Left (IU). She was the coordinator of the United Left La Rioja from 2008 to 2016, and a member of the secretariat of the Party of the European Left (2015–2019).

Moreno was placed second on the IU-Podemos list in the 2019 Riojan regional election. The list had two deputies elected to the Parliament of La Rioja, namely Raquel Romero of Podemos, and Moreno. Moreno gave her vote for Concha Andreu of the Spanish Socialist Workers' Party (PSOE) to be president of the regional government, while Romero initially cast the crucial vote against; Moreno reacted by accusing Romero of betrayal of the left. Romero later cast the decisive vote and was named a minister in the government of Concha Andreu.

Moreno was elected unopposed as the lead candidate for the IU in the 2023 Riojan regional election. In April, near the deadline, Podemos was again added to the list, with that party receiving 60% of funds. The grouping retained its two seats in parliament, while the People's Party (PP) took the absolute majority of 17 out of 33.

In the 2024 European Parliament election in Spain, Moreno stood in 24th place on the Sumar list. The list took three seats, none of which were IU members.
