= Rubén Antoñanzas =

Spanish politician (born 1972)

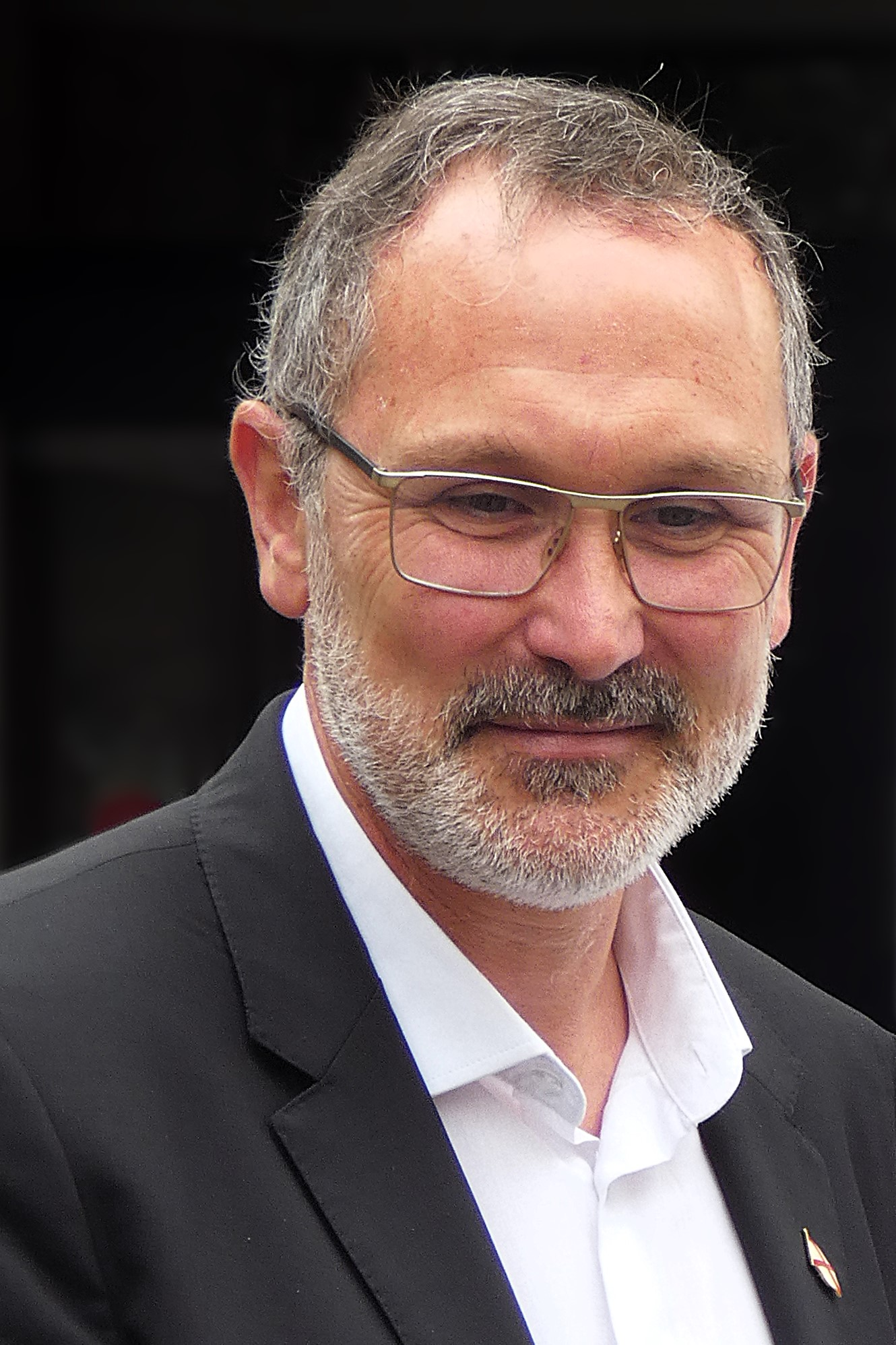

Rubén Antoñanzas Blanco (born 20 March 1972) is a Spanish politician of the Riojan Party (PR+). He was elected to the city council in Logroño in 2015 and was president of his party from 2017 to 2025.

Antoñanzas gave his support to a Spanish Socialist Workers' Party-led government in Logroño in 2019, and was named as the councillor in charge of sports. During his leadership of PR+, the party failed to win a seat in the Parliament of La Rioja in 2019 or 2023, the latter on a joint list with Empty Spain.

== Biography ==
Antoñanzas was born in Logroño in La Rioja. He has long been involved in scouting, and led the Scout Association in his home region. He is an insurance specialist.

In the 2011 Spanish local elections, Antoñanzas was placed third on the list in Logroño for Ciudadanos de Logroño, a party founded by former mayor Julio Revuelta after his exit from the People's Party (PP). The party fused into the Riojan Party (PR+).

Antoñanzas was chosen as the PR+ candidate for mayor of Logroño in the 2015 Spanish local elections, having run unopposed. He was the only party member elected to the city council.

On 3 June 2017, the 15th Congress of the Riojan Party was held at the University of La Rioja. Antoñanzas was elected party president with 90.9% of the vote, and named Revuelta as secretary general. He was again his party's only representative on the city council in the regional capital in 2019, and struck an agreement to support the 11 councillors of the Spanish Socialist Workers' Party (PSOE) and install their leader Pablo Hermoso de Mendoza González as mayor, ending eight years of PP government. In the local government, he was put in charge of sports.

Antoñanzas declined the opportunity to be the lead PR+ candidate in the 2019 Riojan regional election, a role that was taken by Revuelta. The list did not win a seat in the Parliament of La Rioja.

In December 2022, having run unopposed, Antoñanzas was re-elected as leader of PR+ at the 16th Congress. He formed a pact with Empty Spain (EV) for the 2023 Riojan regional election, in which their leader Inmaculada Sáenz would lead and he would be second on the list. The decision led to some PR+ figures leaving and forming a new party with ex-PP members, naming it Por La Rioja (PLRi). Neither regionalist party won a seat in the Parliament of La Rioja.

On 15 July 2025, with the 17th party congress to be held in November, Antoñanzas resigned as president of PR+ and named Rita Beltrán as acting president. Antoñanzas, who had retained the party's only seat in Logroño in the 2023 Spanish local elections, said that two terms were enough and that parties should change their leaderships.
