= Raquel Romero =

Spanish journalist and former politician (born 1982)

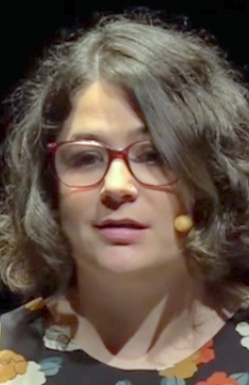

Raquel Romero Alonso (born 8 July 1982) is a Spanish journalist and former politician.

A member of Podemos, she led a joint list with the United Left (IU) that won two seats in the Parliament of La Rioja in the 2019 Riojan regional election. She twice cast the crucial vote against the election of Concha Andreu of the Spanish Socialist Workers' Party (PSOE) as President of La Rioja, making the ultimatum that Podemos should hold ministries in her government. The coalition was eventually formed and she was made Minister of Participation, Human Rights and Cooperation.

In 2022, Romero was expelled from Podemos for non-payment of dues, and from the parliamentary group she had made with Henar Moreno of the IU. She did not run in the 2023 Riojan regional election.

== Biography ==
Born in Logroño in La Rioja, Romero graduated in journalism from the University of the Basque Country. She was the editor of the Rioja edition of the Basque-based newspaper El Correo. In 2007, she moved to Berlin, where she joined the overseas sector of Podemos in 2015, taking part in its first abroad convention in Paris that September.

On 16 March 2019, Romero was confirmed as Podemos's lead candidate in the 2019 Riojan regional election, on the decision of the party's national leader, Pablo Iglesias. The decision to not run a primary was unusual for the party, and the previous list leader Germán Cantabrana sued the party, eventually receiving €160,000 in 2021. Running a joint list with the United Left, Romero was elected to the Parliament of La Rioja alongside the latter's leader, Henar Moreno; the group fell from four seats to two.

The support of Romero and Moreno would be needed for a left-wing majority of 17 seats out of 33 and to install Concha Andreu of the Spanish Socialist Workers' Party (PSOE) as President of La Rioja, but Romero voted against twice. Negotiating alongside Podemos consultants from Castilla–La Mancha, she demanded that the party hold several ministries in Andreu's government, including vice-presidency for herself. Moreno accused Romero of "betrayal" of the chance to end 24 years of People's Party governance in La Rioja, and asked Podemos to put the decision up to a referendum of its members. Podemos national leader Iglesias was also critical of Romero, saying "you can't ask for more than your votes gave you".

On 29 August 2019, Romero was named Minister of Participation, Human Rights and Cooperation in the government of Concha Andreu. Podemos had initially named Nazaret Martín, its secretary in Logroño City Council, as the minister, but she resigned for personal reasons.

Romero was expelled from Podemos on 18 March 2022 for failure to abide by a party rule requiring any part of a public salary over €2,100 per month – three times the national minimum wage – to be paid back to the party. On 28 April, the parliamentary board agreed to expel her from the Mixed Group she had set up with Moreno; the proposal had been tabled by Moreno, on the request of Podemos. Romero announced she would not run in the 2023 Riojan regional election.
