= Government of Concha Andreu =

Government in La Rioja, Spain

Andreu government
- Government of La Rioja

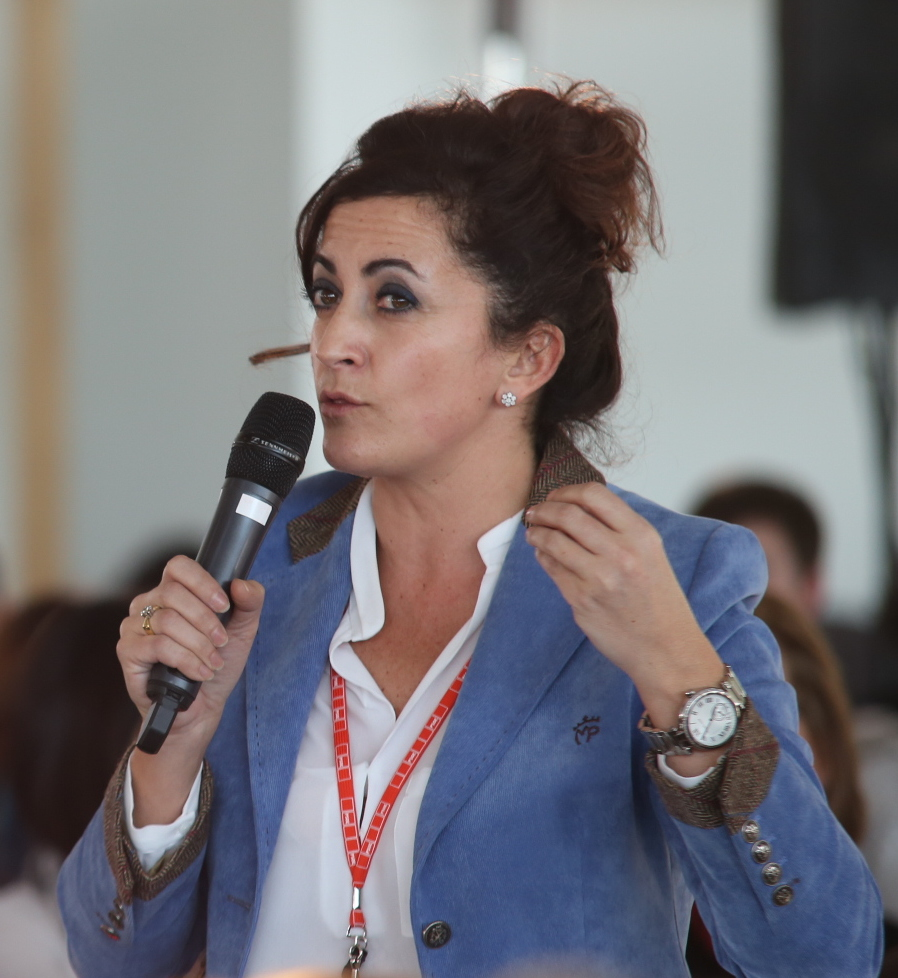
- Date formed: 30 August 2019
- Date dissolved: 2023

People and organisations
- Head of state: Felipe VI
- Head of government: Concha Andreu
- No. of ministers: 10
- Ministers removed: 0
- Total no. of members: 10
- Member party: Socialist Party; Podemos
- Status in legislature: Minority coalition 16 / 33 (48%)
- Opposition party: People's Party
- Opposition leader: José Ignacio Ceniceros

History
- Election: 26 May 2019
- Outgoing election: 2023
- Legislature terms: 10th Parliament of La Rioja (2019–2023)
- Predecessor: Ceniceros
- Successor: Capellán

The government of Concha Andreu was the incumbent regional government of La Rioja led by President Concha Andreu. It was formed in August 2019 after the regional election, and lasted until after the 2023 Riojan regional election.

== Government ==
Name	Portrait	Party	Office	Took office	Left office	^{Refs.}
Concha Andreu		Socialist Party of La Rioja	President	29 August 2019		
Sara Alba		Socialist Party of La Rioja	Minister of Health	30 August 2019		
Luis Cacho		Independent	Minister of Education and Culture	30 August 2019		
José Ignacio Castresana		Independent	Minister of Regional Development	30 August 2019		
Celso González		Socialist Party of La Rioja	Minister of Finance	30 August 2019		
Eva Hita		Independent	Minister of Agriculture, Livestock, Rural World, Territory and Population	30 August 2019		
Francisco Ocón		Socialist Party of La Rioja	Minister of Public Governance	30 August 2019		
Raquel Romero		Podemos	Minister of Participation, Cooperation and Human Rights	30 August 2019		
José Luis Rubio		Socialist Party of La Rioja	Minister of Sustainability and Ecological Transition	30 August 2019		
Ana Santos		Socialist Party of La Rioja	Minister of Social Services and Citizenship	30 August 2019		
