= Vinea (political party) =

- Founded: September 2019
- Merger of: 9 February 2026
- Split from: Vox
- Merged into: Riojan Party
- Ideology: Regionalism
- Municipal councillors in La Rioja: 3 / 1,030

Website
- vinealarioja.com (archived)

Vinea (sometimes stylised in all capitals) was a Spanish political party in the autonomous community of La Rioja. Founded in 2019, it won four seats in the 2023 local elections, including two in Cervera del Río Alhama where it was part of the local government until 2025. The party merged into the Riojan Party in 2026.

== History ==
Vinea launched its online presence in September 2019, stating that it is a regionalist party of the centre or centre-right. Its name is Latin for "the vine", in reference to the wine industry in La Rioja. It was founded by former members of Vox, who had left following the 2019 Riojan regional election. Founding president Fernando Martínez Soldevilla was the deputy leader of Vox in Calahorra.

In the 2023 Spanish local elections, Vinea won four seats in municipalities of La Rioja. According to Pablo Álvarez in regional newspaper La Rioja, there were three parties – Vinea, the Riojan Party (PR+) and its offshoot Por La Rioja (PLRi) – who were competing for the same political space as conservative regionalists, a space that was shrinking due to political polarisation throughout Spain.

One of Vinea's seats was in the major town of Haro. The councillor, Laura Vidaurre Treviño, formed a coalition government led by the seven members of the People's Party (PP), who with Vidaurre and the member from Citizens (Cs), held a majority of the 17-seat council. In August 2024, Vidaurre was removed from the governing coalition due to disagreements with projects, and was replaced with the councillor from PLRi. In June 2025, she quit the party and continued to sit as an independent, stating that Vinea had taken a different course as a party from what had been expected.

In Cervera del Río Alhama, the two Vinea councillors governed with the five from the PP in the 11-seat council. In May 2025, Vinea left the local government, alleging that pact promises had been broken.

Vinea also took part in the 2023 Riojan regional election, with Fernando Martínez Soldevilla as candidate for regional president. The party list was the second least voted, with 0.57%, and took no seats in the Parliament of La Rioja.

On 9 February 2026, Vinea merged into the Riojan Party in an effort to unify regionalism.
