= Por La Rioja =

- General Secretary: Sonsoles Soriano
- Founder: Alberto Bretón
- Founded: 22 February 2023
- Split from: People's Party of La Rioja, Riojan Party
- Ideology: Regionalism
- Mayors in La Rioja: 6 / 177
- Municipal councillors in La Rioja: 53 / 1,030

Website
- https://porlarioja.com/

Por La Rioja (PLRi; lit. 'For La Rioja') is a Spanish political party in the autonomous community of La Rioja. Founded in 2023, the party won the third-most councillors and mayors in the region in the year's local elections.

== History ==
Por La Rioja was announced on 16 February 2023. Among its founders were Alberto Bretón, a former secretary general of the People's Party of La Rioja (PP), who had been a member of the Parliament of La Rioja and a minister in the Government of La Rioja. He quit the PP over Gonzalo Capellán being appointed solely by the national leadership as lead candidate in the 2023 Riojan regional election. He was joined by former members of the Riojan Party, who had left over disagreement with the party running a joint list with the Empty Spain platform.

Por La Rioja was launched on 22 February 2023 in the regional capital Logroño. Bretón was unanimously elected secretary general of the new party and held an extraordinary congress on 18 March, in which he criticised the PP for a lack of internal democracy, called government partners Podemos and the United Left extremist parties, and said that the party would not support Vox due to the latter's support of centralisation.

In the 2023 Spanish local elections in La Rioja, the party took five out of 174 mayors' offices in the region, behind 108 of the PP and 47 for the Spanish Socialist Workers' Party (PSOE). The five were Hormilla, Laguna de Cameros, Pazuengos, Santa Engracia del Jubera and Sotés. It won 52 councillors, third behind the 537 of the PP and 340 of the PSOE, but did not take seats in the major cities nor in the Parliament. A sixth mayor's office and additional councillor was added in October 2023 in Pinillos after the death of the PP incumbent and resignation of his successor. In August 2024, the party's one councillor in Haro joined the PP-led local government, replacing the one from another new regionalist party, Vinea.

On 17 October 2023, Bretón, who had won no seats in his campaign for mayor of Logroño, left the secretary-general position while remaining within the party. He was succeeded by Sonsoles Soriano, who had been the lead parliamentary candidate.

== Ideology ==
On its launch, the party outlined five fundamental points:

1. Improvement of public services
2. Protection and sustainable development of rural areas, action against depopulation
3. Action on employment and development, and the role of the University of La Rioja
4. Support of the industrial and agricultural sectors, including the wine industry
5. Promotion of La Rioja's history, culture and traditions
