= Pablo Baena =

Spanish politician

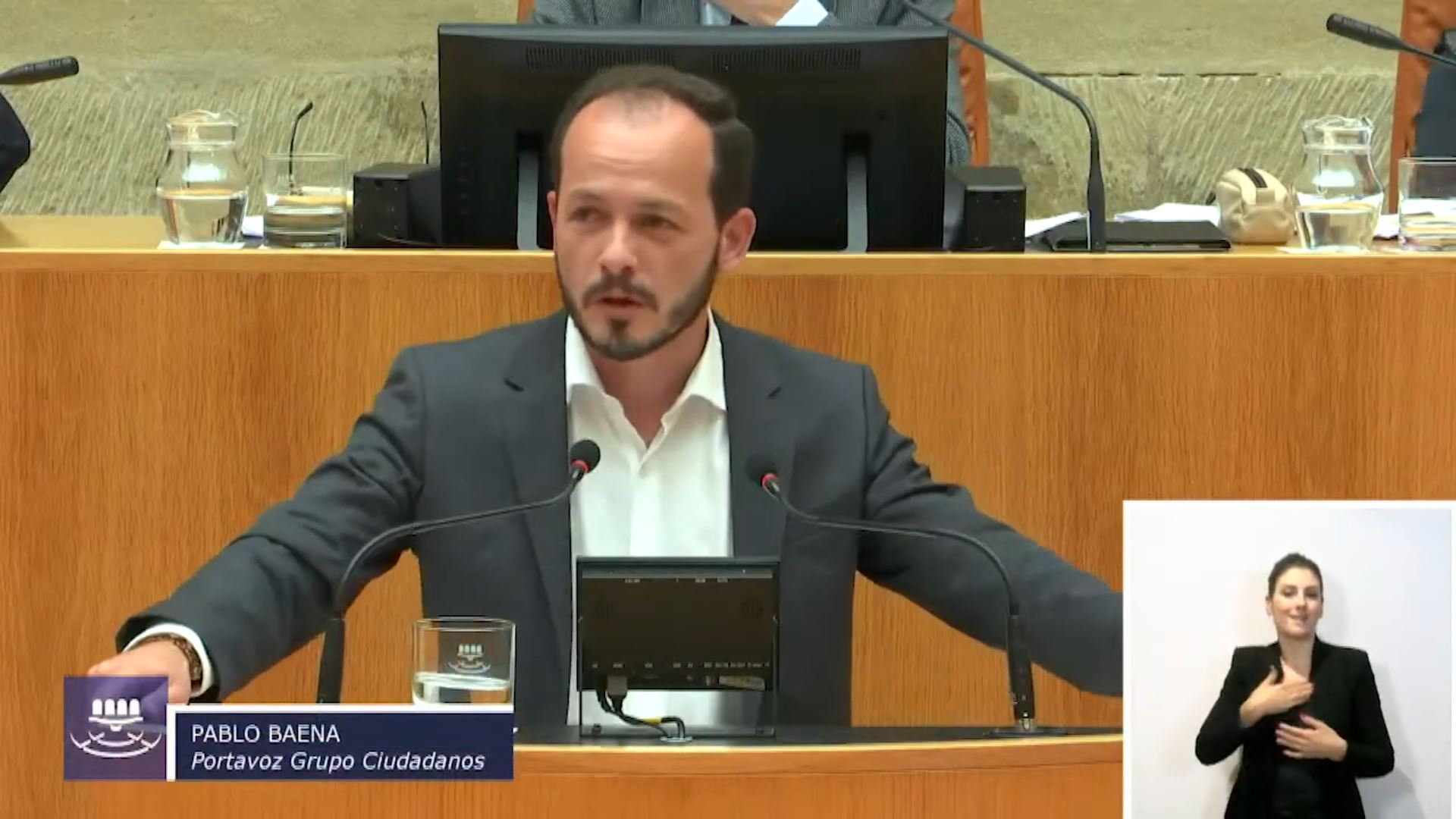

Pablo Baena Pedrosa (born 20 September 1984) is a Spanish former politician. He led the party Citizens in the Parliament of La Rioja from 2019 to 2022. He quit his seat and his party membership due to ideological differences.

== Biography ==
Baena was born in Burgos in Castile and León and grew up in Calahorra in La Rioja, before moving to Logroño, capital of the latter autonomous community. He has a master's degree in real estate and a diploma in tourism from the University of La Rioja. Before his political career, he had lived in countries in Europe and Africa, and spent two years with Spanish companies in equatorial Africa up to the end of 2014.

Baena won the primary to be Citizens' lead candidate in the La Rioja congressional constituency in the 2015 Spanish general election. David García, the founder and coordinator of the party's branch in La Rioja, came last of three. Baena did not win a seat in the Congress of Deputies, nor six months later in the next election, taking around 15% of the vote in both.

In February 2017, Baena became the first Riojan to be elected into Citizens' General Council. In October that year, he was named the party's spokesperson in La Rioja.

Baena ran unopposed to be Citizens' lead candidate in the 2019 Riojan regional election. His party came third, maintaining four seats in the Parliament of La Rioja, but the balance of power swung to parties of the left with 17 out of 33 seats.

Citizens' national leader Inés Arrimadas named Baena to the party's National Executive Committee in March 2021. In October that year, elDiario.es reported that Baena would likely be the party's candidate in the 2023 Riojan regional election, due to his alignment with Arrimadas amid internal disputes. On 22 October 2022, however, hequit his parliamentary seat and all involvement with the party. In his communication, he accused the party of drifting from liberalism to the far left, citing its support for gender self-identification, euthanasia and surrogacy as incompatible with his beliefs. In the election, the party lost all its seats and took only 0.78% of the vote.
