= Ángel Alda =

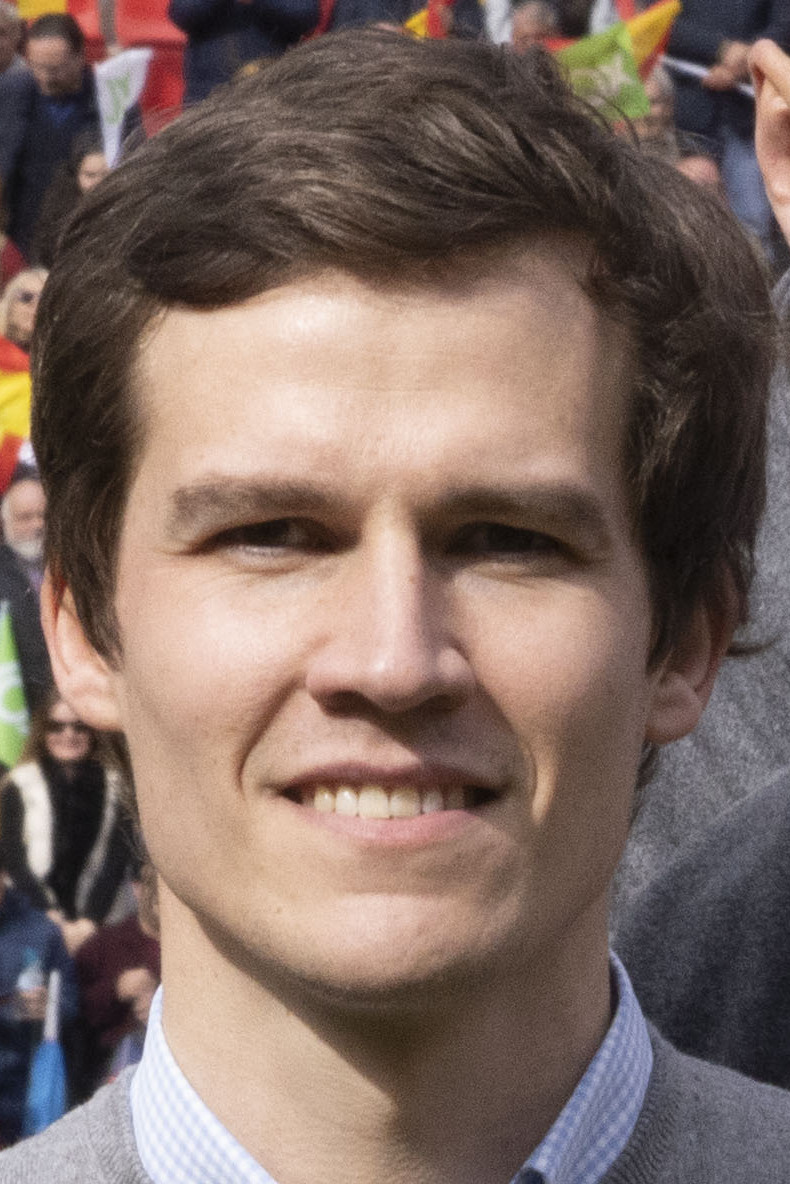

Ángel Alda Pérez (born 12 April 1991) is a Spanish politician of the party Vox. He was elected to the Parliament of La Rioja in 2023, as his party's leader.

== Biography ==
Born in Logroño in La Rioja, Alda graduated in 2014 from the Comillas Pontifical University in 2014 with a degree in law and political sciences. He then obtained a master's degree in law from the International University of La Rioja. He moved to Madrid in 2016 to lead the legal department of the Spanish Association of Peugeot Dealers, returning to his hometown the following year to co-manage the lottery that his grandmother had founded in 1973.

In December 2022, Alda was named Vox's president in La Rioja, as well as its lead candidate in the 2023 Riojan regional election. While People's Party (PP) candidate Gonzalo Capellán said that Vox would never enter his government, Alda said that he would support any outcome that would remove Concha Andreu of the Spanish Socialist Workers' Party (PSOE) from the regional presidency. Vox came third, taking its first two of 33 seats in the Parliament of La Rioja. He congratulated the PP for ending the PSOE-led and Unidas Podemos-assisted government by winning a majority of seats, and said that Vox's role would be to ensure that the new government stayed on the right.

== Personal life ==
In 2023, Alda listed his hobbies as golf, running and travel. He attended school and university with Juan García-Gallardo, who led Vox in Castile and León, and considered the PP-Vox government there as a model for La Rioja.
