= Germán Cantabrana =

Germán Cantabrana González (born 12 February 1974) is a Spanish former politician. He led Podemos in the Parliament of La Rioja from 2015 to 2019. After being excluded from his party's primaries for the 2019 Riojan regional election, he sued and was awarded €160,231 for violation of the right to political participation. He was expelled from Podemos in 2021 for self-proclaiming a rival leadership body.

== Biography ==
Born in Logroño in La Rioja, Cantabrana set up his own information technology company around 2005. He ran on local election lists for the Riojan Party (PR+) in his hometown and in Alberite.

At the start of 2015, Cantabrana took 55% of the vote to be the secretary general of Podemos in his hometown. On 14 April that year, the party's secretary general at regional level, Raúl Ausejo, was suspended from leading Podemos in the 2015 Riojan regional election due to alleged fraud, and was replaced by Cantabrana. Both Podemos and Citizens entered the Parliament of La Rioja for the first time, with four seats each.

In October 2018, Cantabrana was not accepted for the Podemos primaries for lead candidate in the 2019 Riojan regional election, over alleged lack of payment. The following month, a judge paused the primaries, due to Cantabrana's complaint over violation of his right to political participation. The court found in Cantabrana's favour and Podemos appealed, before unilaterally appointing Raquel Romero as lead candidate in March 2019.

Cantabrana joined forces with Sara Carreño, another unsuccessful candidate from the 2019 Podemos regional primaries, to allege fraud in the party leadership; they self-proclaimed their own leadership body in June 2020. They were among 13 members expelled for this action in April 2021. In October 2021, Cantabrana's lawsuit against Podemos for impeding his candidacy concluded; he was awarded €160,231 for violation of his rights.

In March 2022, Cantabrana launched Ganar La Rioja. He said that the new organisation was modelled on Teruel Existe and Soria ¡Ya!
