= Bucesta =

- Populated place
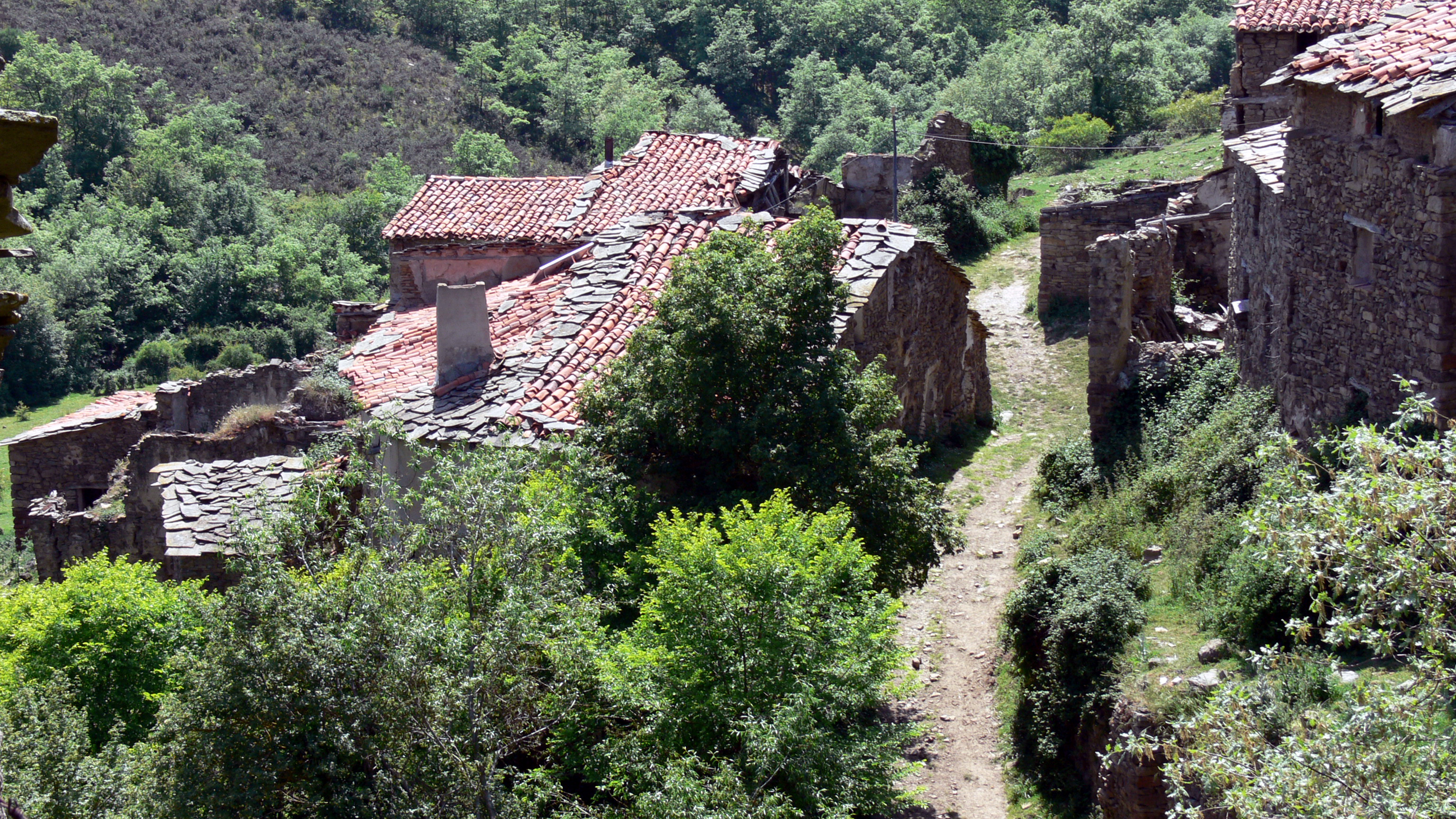
- Street of Bucesta.

- Location within La Rioja, Spain Location within Spain
- Country: Spain
- Autonomous community: La Rioja
- Comarca: Logroño

Population
  - Total: 2
- Postal code: 26131

Bucesta is a village in the municipality of Santa Engracia del Jubera, in the province and autonomous community of La Rioja, Spain. As of 2018 had a population of two people.
