= Sara Alba =

Spanish politician (born 1968)

Sara Alba (born 1968) is a Spanish politician from the Socialist Party of La Rioja. A member of the Socialist Party, she served as Minister of Health in the Government of Concha Andreu from 30 August 2019 until her dismissal in January 2022.
