= Javier García (politician, born 1982) =

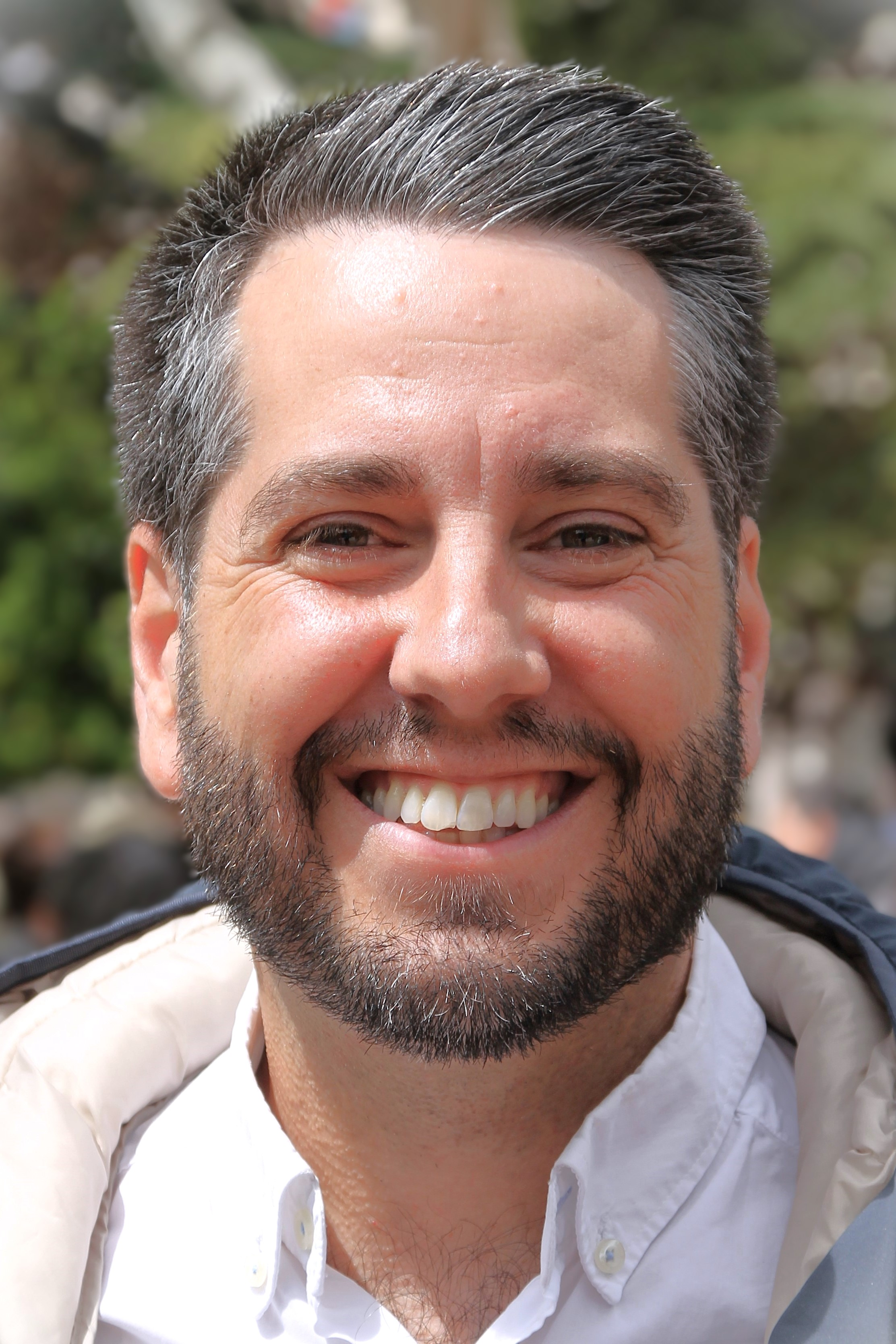

Javier García Ibáñez (born 14 August 1982) is a Spanish Socialist Workers' Party politician. He was a councillor (2003–2025) and the mayor (2015–2025) of Arnedo in La Rioja. He was elected to the Parliament of La Rioja in 2023 and became secretary general of the PSOE in the region in 2025.

== Biography ==
Born in Calahorra in La Rioja, García was elected to the council in Arnedo in 2003. In April 2012, he was elected as leader of the Spanish Socialist Workers' Party (PSOE) in the town, with 50.6% of the vote. In 2015, he was elected mayor, ending 12 years of Juan Antonio Abad Pérez of the People's Party. He was elected to lead the 17-member council by the eight members of his party and the one from the United Left. Four years later, his party won an absolute majority with ten seats.

García was named spokesperson of the governing board of the Spanish Federation of Municipalities and Provinces (FEMP) in May 2016, replacing another Socialist mayor in La Rioja, Laura Rivado of Haro. He was named in the executive of the regional PSOE by secretary general Concha Andreu in June 2021, becoming secretary of institutional relations.

In 2023, García won a third term as mayor, as well as being elected to the Parliament of La Rioja, where he was made the party's spokesperson. On 16 December 2024, having run unopposed, he became the new secretary general of the PSOE in La Rioja. The following 26 February he left his office as mayor of Arnedo, ceding it to Rosa María Herce, who also inherited his office as leader of the local party branch in June.
