= Santa Engracia del Jubera =

- Municipality
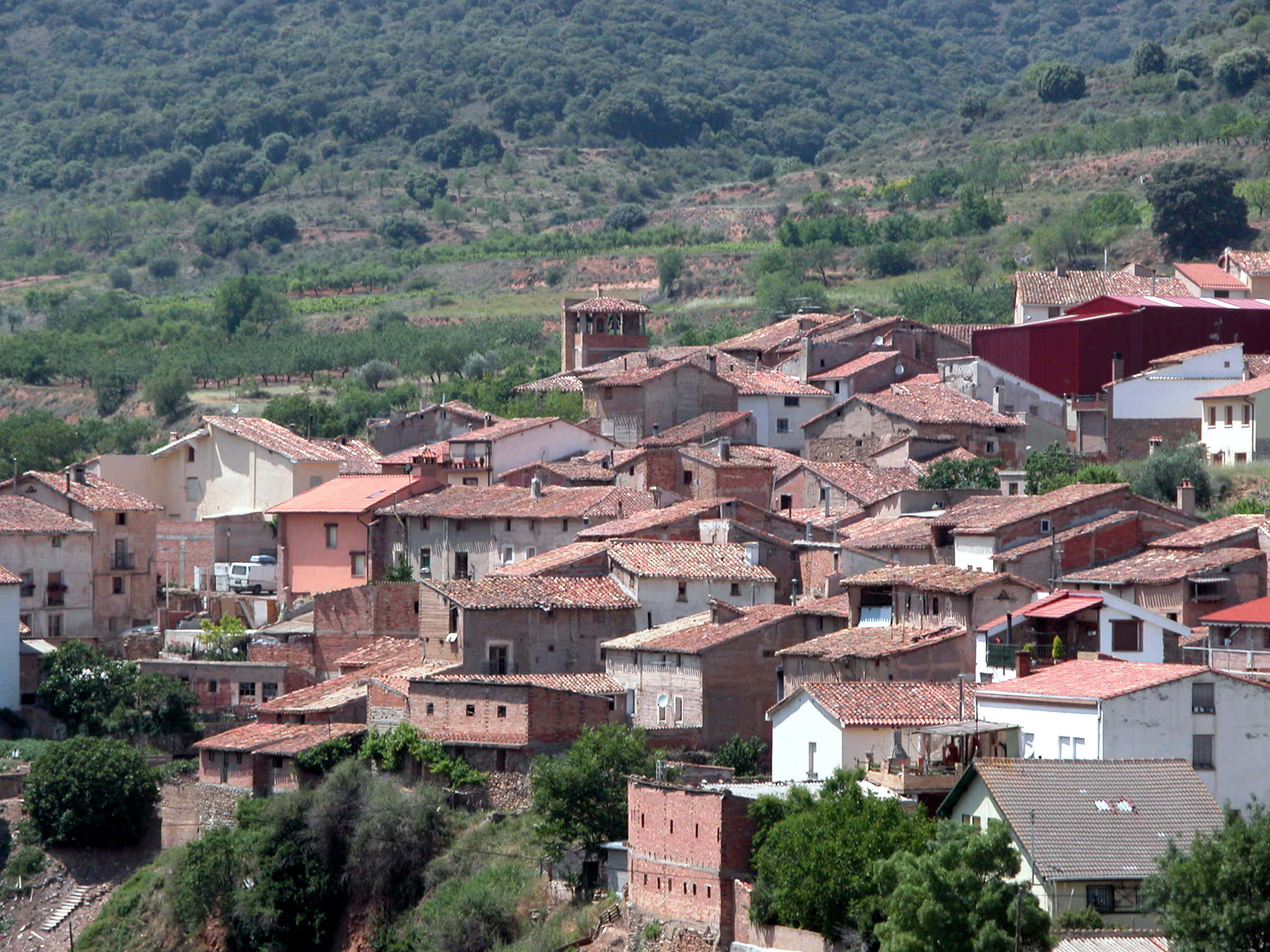
- Skyline of Santa Engracia del Jubera

- Location within La Rioja, Spain Location within Spain
- Coordinates: 42°18′53″N 2°18′22″W
- Country: Spain
- Autonomous community: La Rioja
- Comarca: Logroño

Government
  - Mayor: Óscar Fernández Fernández (PP)

Area
  - Total: 86.07 km^{2} (33.23 sq mi)
- Elevation: 655 m (2,149 ft)

Population (2025-01-01)
  - Total: 188
- Postal code: 26131

Santa Engracia del Jubera is a village in the province and autonomous community of La Rioja, Spain. The municipality covers an area of 86.07 square kilometres (33.23 sq mi) and as of 2011 had a population of 186 people.

== Demographics ==
=== Population centres ===
- Santa Engracia del Jubera
- Bucesta
- El Collado
- Jubera
- Reinares
- San Bartolomé
- San Martín
- Santa Cecilia
- Santa Marina
