= 2023 Riojan regional election =

Election in the Spanish region of La Rioja

- 28 May 2023

All 33 seats in the Parliament of La Rioja 17 seats needed for a majority
- Opinion polls
- Registered: 251,919 ▲0.8%
- Turnout: 170,779 (67.8%) ▲1.9 pp
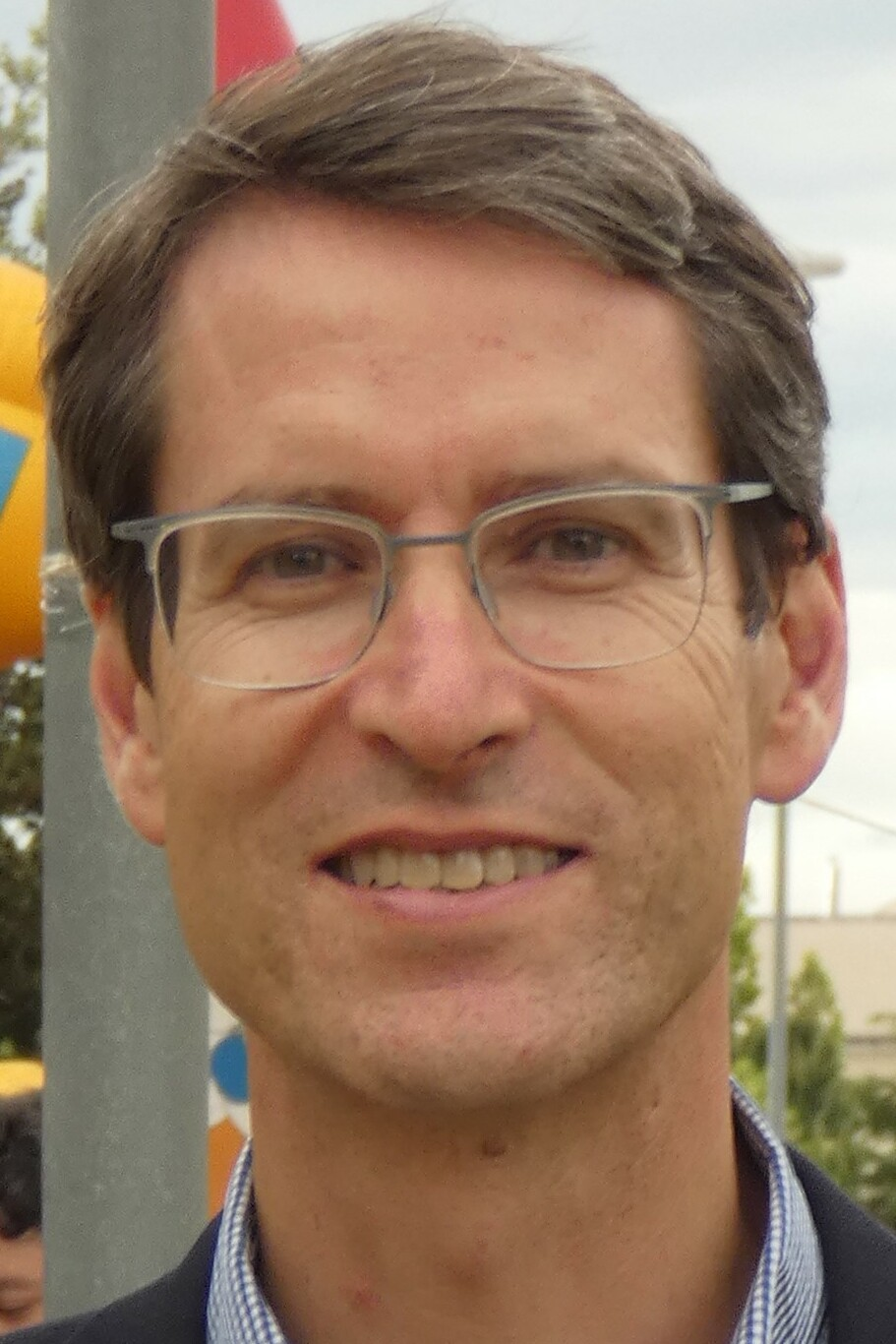

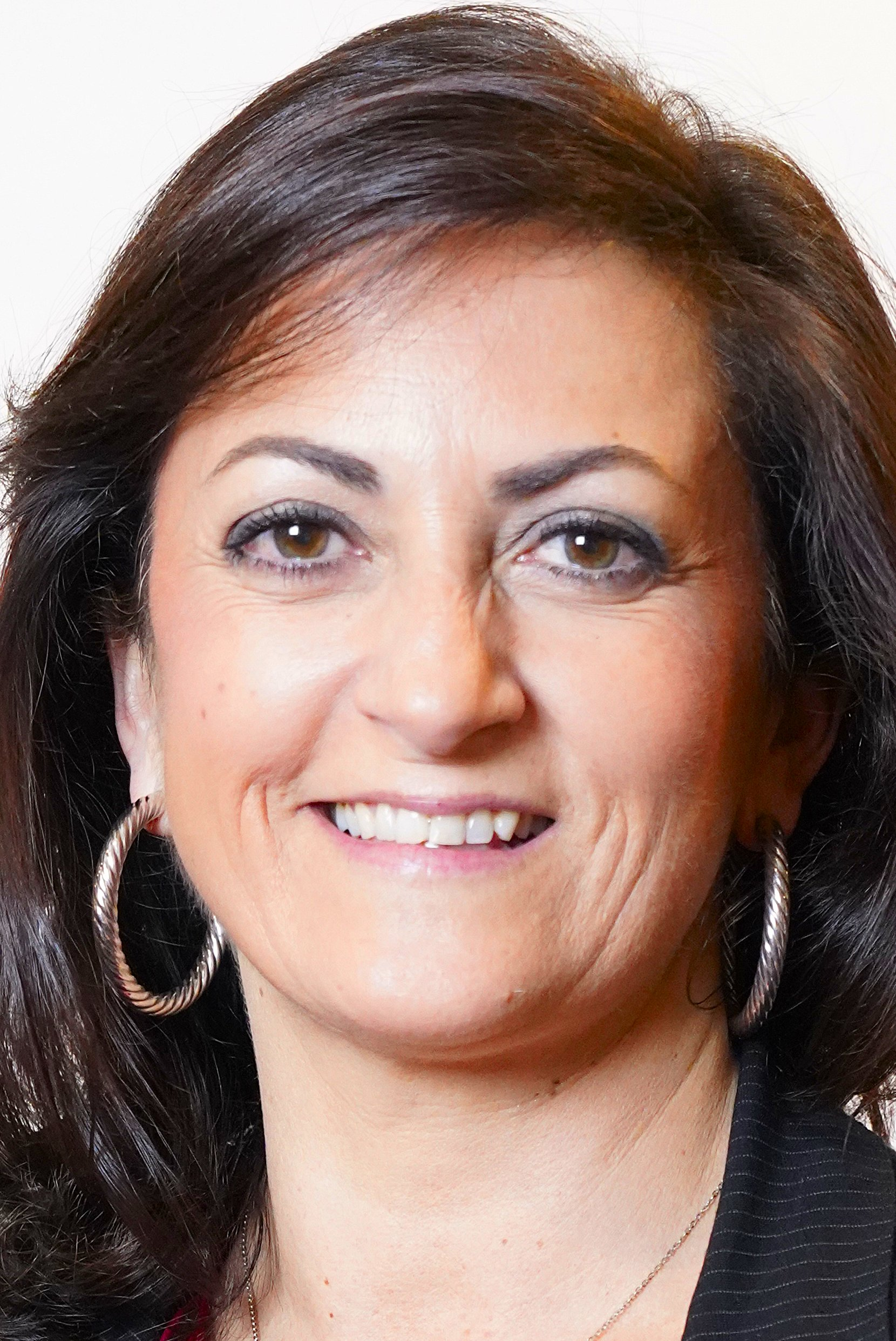

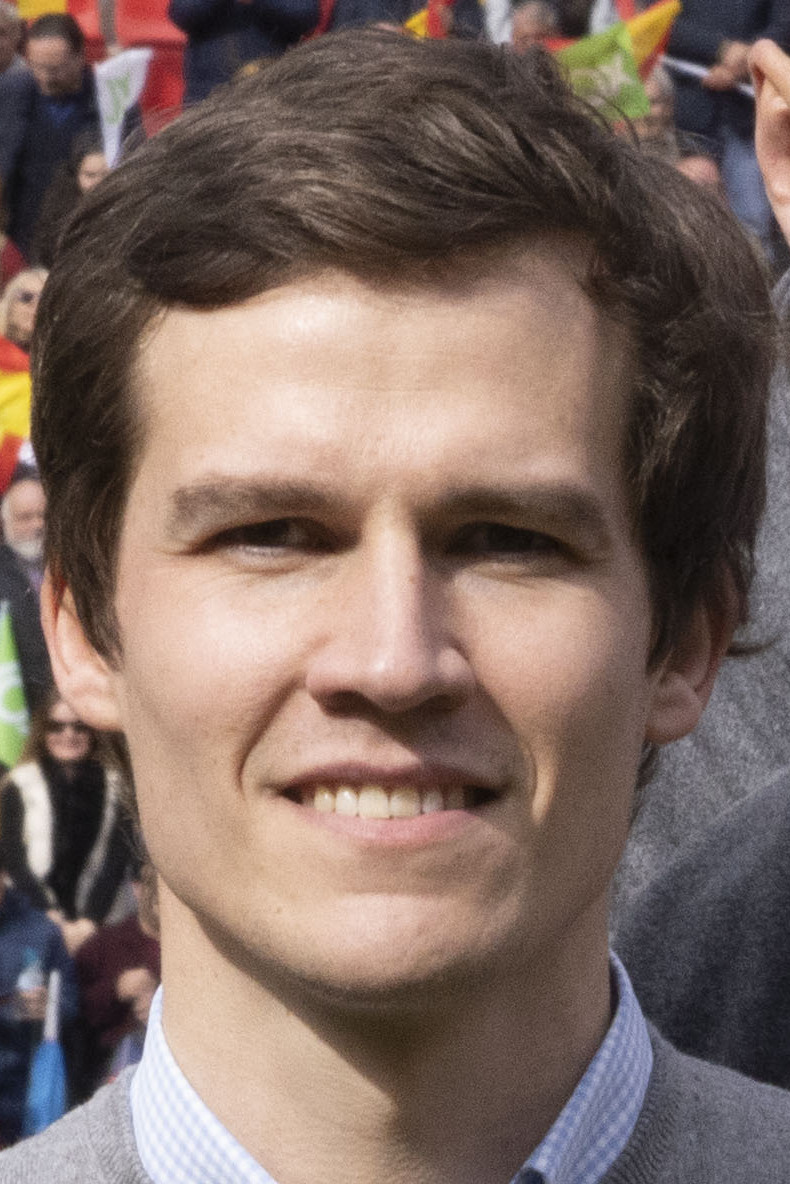

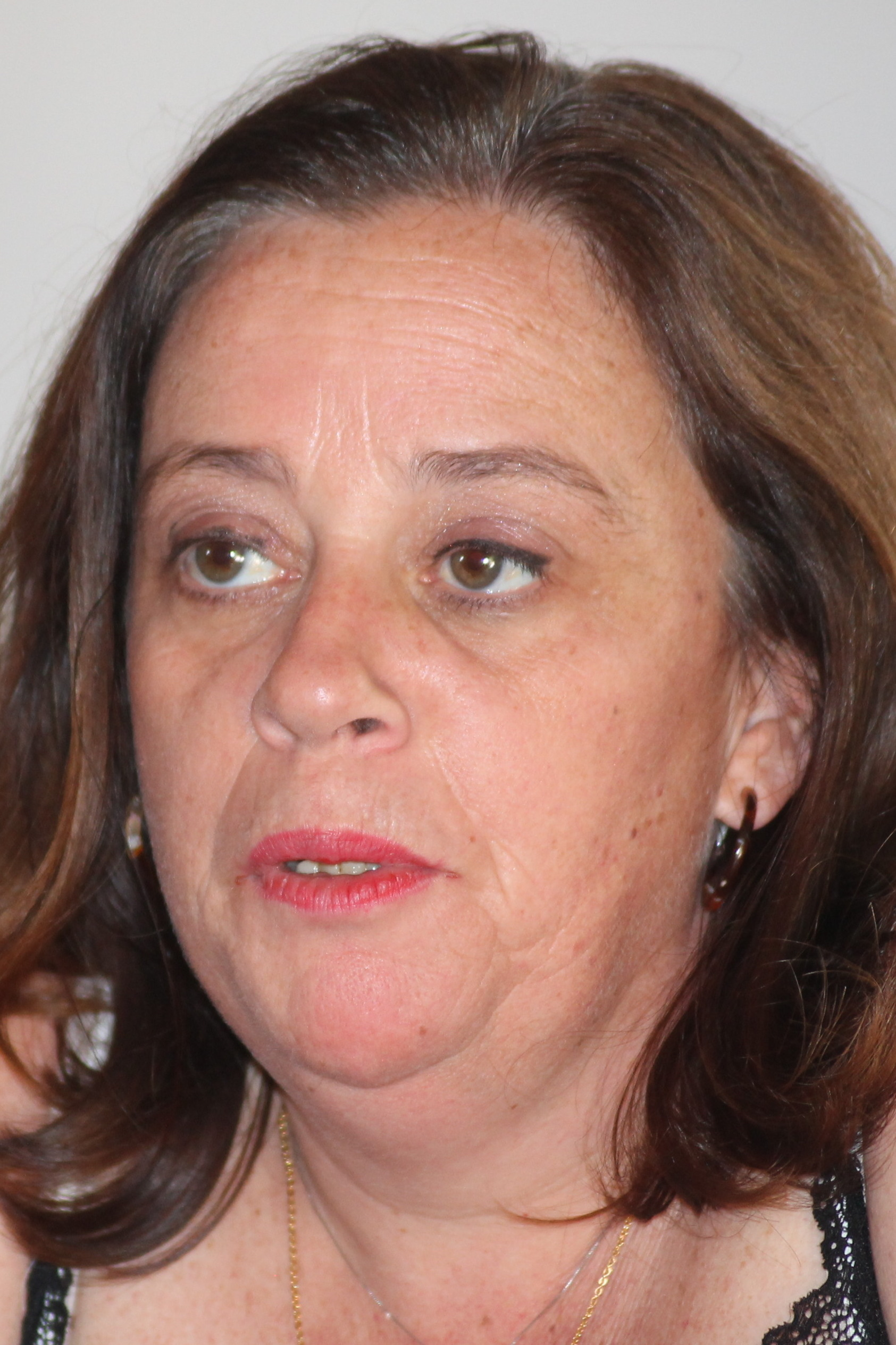

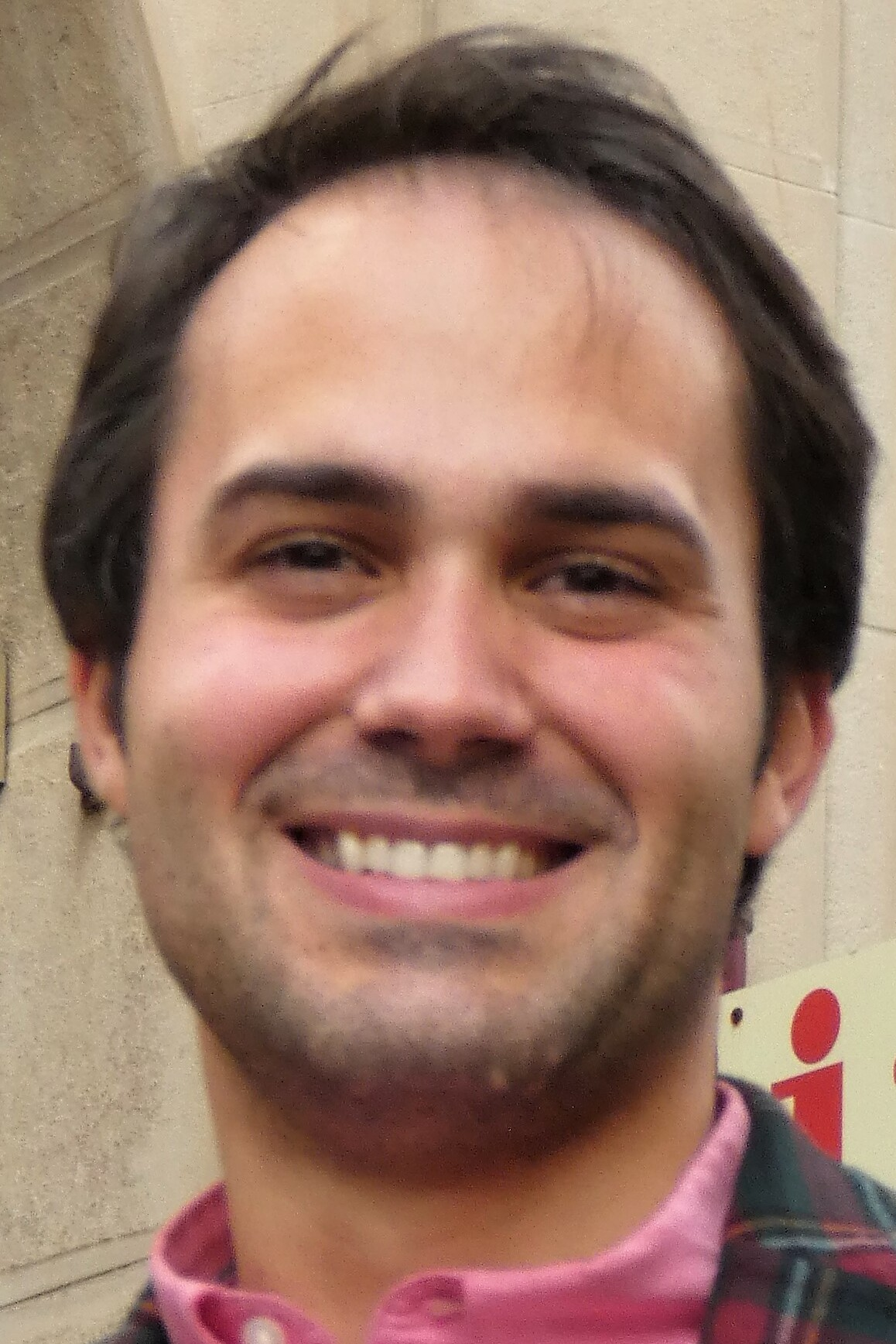
	First party	Second party	Third party
Leader	Gonzalo Capellán	Concha Andreu	Ángel Alda
Party	PP	PSOE	Vox
Leader since	13 October 2022	19 October 2014	13 February 2023
Last election	12 seats, 33.1%	15 seats, 38.7%	0 seats, 3.9%
Seats won	17	12	2
Seat change	▲5	▼3	▲2
Popular vote	76,205	53,562	12,773
Percentage	45.4%	31.9%	7.6%
Swing	▲12.3 pp	▼6.8 pp	▲3.7 pp
	Fourth party	Fifth party
Leader	Henar Moreno	Ángel Daniel Íñiguez
Party	Podemos–IU	CS
Leader since	5 April 2022	13 February 2023
Last election	2 seats, 6.6%	4 seats, 11.5%
Seats won	2	0
Seat change	0	▼4
Popular vote	8,543	1,473
Percentage	5.1%	0.9%
Swing	▼1.5 pp	▼10.6 pp
President before election
Concha Andreu
PSOE
Elected President
Gonzalo Capellán
PP

The 2023 Riojan regional election was held on 28 May 2023 to elect the 11th Parliament of the autonomous community of La Rioja. All 33 seats in the Parliament were up for election. It was held concurrently with regional elections in eleven other autonomous communities and local elections all throughout Spain.

The election saw the People's Party (PP) winning an absolute majority of seats which, under Gonzalo Capellán, ousted the incumbent coalition government of the Spanish Socialist Workers' Party (PSOE) and Unidas Podemos led by Concha Andreu. The election also saw the entry into parliament of far-right Vox, which secured more votes than required to reach the election threshold of five percent, whereas the Riojan Party (PR) failed to secure the threshold for the third time in a row.

== Overview ==
=== Electoral system ===
The Parliament of La Rioja was the devolved, unicameral legislature of the autonomous community of La Rioja, having legislative power in regional matters as defined by the Spanish Constitution and the Riojan Statute of Autonomy, as well as the ability to vote confidence in or withdraw it from a regional president. Voting for the Parliament was on the basis of universal suffrage, which comprised all nationals over 18 years of age, registered in La Rioja and in full enjoyment of their political rights. Amendments to the electoral law in 2022 abolished the "begged" or expat vote system (Spanish: Voto rogado), under which Spaniards abroad were required to apply for voting before being permitted to vote. The expat vote system was attributed responsibility for a major decrease in the turnout of Spaniards abroad during the years it had been in force.

The 33 members of the Parliament of La Rioja were elected using the D'Hondt method and a closed list proportional representation, with an electoral threshold of five percent of valid votes—which included blank ballots—being applied regionally.

=== Election date ===
The term of the Parliament of La Rioja expired four years after the date of its previous election. Elections to the Parliament were fixed for the fourth Sunday of May every four years. The previous election was held on 26 May 2019, setting the election date for the Parliament on 28 May 2023.

The president had the prerogative to dissolve the Parliament of La Rioja and call a snap election, provided that no motion of no confidence was in process, no nationwide election was due and some time requirements were met: namely, that dissolution did not occur either during the first legislative session or within the legislature's last year ahead of its scheduled expiry, nor before one year had elapsed since a previous dissolution. In the event of an investiture process failing to elect a regional president within a two-month period from the first ballot, the Parliament was to be automatically dissolved and a fresh election called. Any snap election held as a result of these circumstances would not alter the period to the next ordinary election, with elected lawmakers serving the remainder of its original four-year term.

The election to the Parliament of La Rioja was officially triggered on 4 April 2023 after the publication of the election decree in the Official Gazette of La Rioja (BOR), scheduling for the chamber to convene on 22 June.

== Parties and candidates ==
The electoral law allowed for parties and federations registered in the interior ministry, coalitions and groupings of electors to present lists of candidates. Parties and federations intending to form a coalition ahead of an election were required to inform the relevant Electoral Commission within ten days of the election call, whereas groupings of electors needed to secure the signature of at least one percent of the electorate in La Rioja, disallowing electors from signing for more than one list of candidates.

Below is a list of the main parties and electoral alliances which contested the election:

Candidacy	Parties and alliances	Leading candidate	Ideology	Previous result		Gov.	Ref.
Candidacy	Parties and alliances	Leading candidate	Ideology	Vote %	Seats	Gov.	Ref.
PSOE	List: Spanish Socialist Workers' Party (PSOE)	Concha Andreu	Social democracy	38.7%	15	Yes	
PP	List: People's Party (PP)	Gonzalo Capellán	Conservatism; Christian democracy	33.1%	12	No	
CS	List: Citizens–Party of the Citizenry (CS)	Ángel Daniel Íñiguez	Liberalism	11.5%	4	No	
Podemos–IU	List: We Can (Podemos); United Left (IU) – Communist Party of La Rioja (PCE–LR) – The Dawn Marxist Organization (La Aurora (OM)) – Republican Left (IR)	Henar Moreno	Left-wing populism Direct democracy Democratic socialism	6.6%	2	Yes	
PR+EV	List: Riojan Party (PR+); Empty Spain (EV)	Inmaculada Sáenz	Regionalism; Progressivism	4.6%	0	No	
Vox	List: Vox (Vox)	Ángel Alda	Right-wing populism Ultranationalism; National conservatism	3.9%	0	No	

== Campaign ==
=== Debates ===
2023 Riojan regional election debates
Date	Organizer(s)	Moderator(s)	P Present (Note: Denotes a main invitee attending the event.)								
Date	Organizer(s)	Moderator(s)	PSOE	PP	CS	UP	PR+EV	Vox	PLRi	Audience	Ref.
24 May	TVR	Carlos Santamaría	P Andreu	P Capellán	P Íñiguez	P Moreno	P Sáenz	P Alda	P Soriano	TBD	

== Opinion polls ==
The tables below list opinion polling results in reverse chronological order, showing the most recent first and using the dates when the survey fieldwork was done, as opposed to the date of publication. Where the fieldwork dates are unknown, the date of publication is given instead. The highest percentage figure in each polling survey is displayed with its background shaded in the leading party's colour. If a tie ensues, this is applied to the figures with the highest percentages. The "Lead" column on the right shows the percentage-point difference between the parties with the highest percentages in a poll.

=== Graphical summary ===
Local regression trend line of poll results from 26 May 2019 to 28 May 2023, with each line corresponding to a political party.

=== Voting intention estimates ===
The table below lists weighted voting intention estimates. Refusals are generally excluded from the party vote percentages, while question wording and the treatment of "don't know" responses and those not intending to vote may vary between polling organisations. When available, seat projections determined by the polling organisations are displayed below (or in place of) the percentages in a smaller font; 17 seats were required for an absolute majority in the Parliament of La Rioja.

Polling firm/Commissioner	Fieldwork date	Sample size	Turnout	PSOE	PP	CS	Unidas Podemos	PR+	Vox	PLRi	Lead
2023 regional election	28 May 2023	—N/a	67.8	31.9; 12	45.4; 17	0.9; 0	5.1; 2	3.6; 0	7.6; 2	2.6; 0	13.5
NC Report/La Razón	22 May 2023	?	?	33.8; 12	43.1; 15/16	–	5.4; 1/2	6.0; 2	6.7; 2	–	9.3
KeyData/Público	18 May 2023	?	69.7	34.8; 13	42.5; 15/16	2.2; 0	5.5; 2	4.9; 0/1	6.5; 2	–	7.7
EM-Analytics/El Plural	11–17 May 2023	600	?	37.0; 14	39.7; 15	2.1; 0	5.2; 1	5.2; 1	6.8; 2	3.0; 0	2.7
EM-Analytics/El Plural	4–10 May 2023	600	?	37.3; 14	39.3; 15	2.3; 0	5.3; 1	5.5; 1	6.7; 2	3.1; 0	2.0
SW Demoscopia/Cadena SER (Note: Vote+Simpathy figures with undecided and/or abstentionists excluded.)	24 Apr–5 May 2023	1,741	?	39.7	39.9	1.1	5.5	3.6	5.9	1.1	0.2
GAD3/ABC	28 Apr–3 May 2023	1,004	?	34.0; 12/13	42.1; 15/16	–	5.5; 2	5.1; 0/1	7.9; 2/3	–	8.1
EM-Analytics/El Plural	26 Apr–3 May 2023	600	?	37.6; 13	42.0; 15	2.4; 0	5.4; 1	5.5; 2	6.1; 2	2.9; 0	4.4
Simple Lógica/elDiario.es	18–26 Apr 2023	457	?	35.6; 13/14	41.2; 14/15	1.4; 0	6.8; 2	5.4; 1	7.1; 2	–	5.6
CIS	10–26 Apr 2023	466	?	36.8; 13/14	39.2; 14/15	2.5; 0	9.9; 2/4	3.6; 0	5.6; 1/2	–	2.4
EM-Analytics/El Plural	19–25 Apr 2023	600	?	36.1; 13	40.8; 15	2.5; 0	5.2; 1	5.4; 2	5.9; 2	3.7; 0	4.7
EM-Analytics/El Plural	12–18 Apr 2023	600	?	36.2; 13	41.6; 15	2.5; 0	5.4; 2	5.3; 1	5.9; 2	2.9; 0	5.4
EM-Analytics/El Plural	5–11 Apr 2023	600	?	36.5; 13	41.1; 15	2.3; 0	6.0; 2	5.2; 1	6.0; 2	2.8; 0	4.6
EM-Analytics/El Plural	27 Mar–4 Apr 2023	600	?	37.4; 13	42.5; 15	2.8; 0	5.8; 2	5.4; 1	6.0; 2	–	5.1
KeyData/Público	3 Apr 2023	?	69.7	34.6; 13	42.6; 16	2.6; 0	5.4; 1	5.7; 1	6.3; 2	–	8.0
Sigma Dos/PP	14–23 Mar 2023	1,300	?	32.8; 12	41.6; 15/16	2.0; 0	5.7; 2	5.3; 1/2	6.9; 2	1.5; 0	8.8
NC Report/La Razón	27 Feb–3 Mar 2023	?	66.3	34.3; 12	43.3; 16	2.5; 0	5.3; 1	6.6; 2	5.9; 2	–	9.0
Sigma Dos/El Mundo	20–26 Jan 2023	730	?	34.2; 12/13	41.8; 15/16	2.8; 0	6.1; 2	4.3; 0/1	7.4; 2/3	–	7.6
GAD3/PP	19–25 Jan 2023	1,357	?	35.4; 13	43.3; 16	2.8; 0	4.7; 0/1	5.4; 1/2	6.3; 2	–	7.9
SW Demoscopia/PSOE	14 Dec–12 Jan 2023	1,750	?	41.9	39.3	0.8	3.0	2.2	5.2	–	2.6
EM-Analytics/Electomanía	30 Oct–13 Dec 2022	91	?	39.8; 15	39.5; 14	3.0; 0	7.2; 2	4.3; 0	6.2; 2	–	0.3
CIS	17 Nov–2 Dec 2022	191	?	44.9; 14/19	32.7; 12/15	0.6; 0/1	6.3; 0/4	0.6; 0	5.7; 0/3	–	12.2
NueveCuatroUno	1 May 2022	?	?	31.0; 11	47.0; 17	3.9; 0	5.4; 1	6.5; 2	6.3; 2	–	16.0
EM-Analytics/Electomanía	31 Jan–14 Mar 2022	?	?	40.1; 14	34.8; 13	2.9; 0	8.1; 3	4.4; 0	8.4; 3	–	5.3
EM-Analytics/Electomanía	2 Feb 2022	?	?	39.7; 15	36.7; 14	3.1; 0	7.7; 2	4.3; 0	7.7; 2	–	3.0
NueveCuatroUno	12 Dec 2021	?	?	35.8; 13	35.3; 13	4.0; 0	6.6; 2	5.1; 1	11.6; 4	–	0.5
EM-Analytics/Electomanía	3 Aug–12 Sep 2021	?	?	40.5; 15	38.1; 14	3.8; 0	5.6; 2	4.4; 0	6.1; 2	–	2.4
EM-Analytics/Electomanía	16 Jun–23 Jul 2021	?	?	39.8; 15	38.9; 15	2.9; 0	5.1; 1	4.6; 0	7.3; 2	–	0.9
SyM Consulting	22–23 Mar 2021	741	68.7	41.5; 15/16	35.1; 13/14	4.6; 0	5.3; 2	4.3; 0	5.6; 2	–	6.4
ElectoPanel/Electomanía	31 Jan 2021	850	?	37.5; 13	35.4; 13	6.3; 2	6.3; 2	4.9; 0	8.3; 3	–	2.1
SyM Consulting	1–3 Jun 2020	793	69.5	33.5; 12	37.1; 13/14	5.9; 2	7.8; 2/3	4.2; 0	9.1; 3	–	3.6
ElectoPanel/Electomanía	1 Apr–15 May 2020	?	?	42.9; 16	34.8; 13	6.4; 2	4.7; 0	4.7; 0	5.5; 2	–	8.1
NueveCuatroUno	5–6 May 2020	1,375	?	30.0; 11	34.8; 13	7.9; 3	6.0; 2	5.8; 2	6.0; 2	–	4.8
November 2019 general election	10 Nov 2019	—N/a	67.0	34.9 (12)	34.2 (12)	7.1 (2)	9.9 (3)	–	11.5 (4)	–	0.7
2019 regional election	26 May 2019	—N/a	65.9	38.7; 15	33.1; 12	11.5; 4	6.6; 2	4.6; 0	3.9; 0	–	5.6

=== Voting preferences ===
The table below lists raw, unweighted voting preferences.

Polling firm/Commissioner	Fieldwork date	Sample size	PSOE	PP	CS	Unidas Podemos	PR+	Vox	Question	X mark	Lead
2023 regional election	28 May 2023	—N/a	22.8	32.4	0.6	3.6	2.6	5.4	—N/a	27.5	9.6
SW Demoscopia/Cadena SER	24 Apr–5 May 2023	1,741	27.6	27.8	0.8	3.8	2.5	4.1	20.4	10.0	0.2
CIS	10–26 Apr 2023	466	26.5	26.2	1.3	5.9	2.2	4.3	25.1	4.4	0.3
SW Demoscopia/PSOE	14 Dec–12 Jan 2023	1,750	30.4	28.5	0.6	2.2	1.6	3.8	23.9	3.5	1.9
CIS	17 Nov–2 Dec 2022	191	26.0	21.5	0.5	3.8	0.5	3.6	32.5	5.9	4.5
November 2019 general election	10 Nov 2019	—N/a	24.5	24.0	5.0	6.9	–	8.0	—N/a	28.7	0.5
2019 regional election	26 May 2019	—N/a	26.9	23.0	8.0	4.6	3.2	2.7	—N/a	29.7	3.9

=== Preferred President ===
The table below lists opinion polling on leader preferences to become president of La Rioja.

Polling firm/Commissioner	Fieldwork date	Sample size									Other/ None/ Not care	Question	Lead
Polling firm/Commissioner	Fieldwork date	Sample size	Andreu PSOE	Capellán PP	León CS	Íñiguez CS	Moreno UP	Pérez UP	Sáenz PR+EV	Alda Vox	Other/ None/ Not care	Question	Lead
SW Demoscopia/Cadena SER	24 Apr–5 May 2023	1,741	29.4	28.5	–	1.0	4.0	–	3.2	3.9	3.5	26.5	0.9
SW Demoscopia/PSOE	14 Dec–12 Jan 2023	1,750	31.3	26.5	0.4	–	2.6	0.6	1.5	2.5	9.1	25.3	4.8

== Results ==
← Summary of the 28 May 2023 Parliament of La Rioja election results →
Parties and alliances	Popular vote			Seats	
Parties and alliances	Votes	%	±pp	Total	+/−
People's Party (PP)	76,205	45.38	+12.32	17	+5
Spanish Socialist Workers' Party (PSOE)	53,562	31.90	−6.77	12	−3
Vox (Vox)	12,773	7.61	+3.74	2	+2
We Can–United Left (Podemos–IU)	8,543	5.09	−1.56	2	±0
Riojan Party+Empty Spain (PR+EV)	6,016	3.58	−1.03	0	±0
For La Rioja (PLRi)	4,349	2.59	New	0	±0
Citizens–Party of the Citizenry (CS)	1,473	0.88	−10.65	0	−4
Animalist Party with the Environment (PACMA)^{1}	1,065	0.63	−0.03	0	±0
VINEA La Rioja (VINEA)	954	0.57	New	0	±0
Blank Seats to Leave Empty Seats (EB)	619	0.37	New	0	±0
Blank ballots	2,360	1.41	+0.46		
Total	167,919			33	±0
Valid votes	167,919	98.32	−0.67		
Invalid votes	2,860	1.68	+0.67		
Votes cast / turnout	170,779	67.79	+1.85		
Abstentions	81,140	32.21	−1.85		
Registered voters	251,919				
Sources
Footnotes: ^{1} Animalist Party with the Environment results are compared to Animalist Party Against Mistreatment of Animals totals in the 2019 election.

Popular vote
PP	45.38%
PSOE	31.90%
Vox	7.61%
Podemos–IU	5.09%
PR+EV	3.58%
PLRi	2.59%
Others	2.45%
Blank ballots	1.41%

Seats
PP	51.51%
PSOE	36.36%
Vox	6.06%
Podemos–IU	6.06%

== Aftermath ==
Investiture; Gonzalo Capellán (PP)
Ballot →	28 June 2023
Required majority →	17 out of 33
Yes: • PP (17)	17 / 33
No: • PSOE (12); • Vox (2); • Podemos–IU (2)	16 / 33
Abstentions	0 / 33
Absentees	0 / 33
