= Communist Party of La Rioja =

Communist Party of La Rioja Partido Comunista de La Rioja
- Youth wing: Communist Youth of La Rioja (UJCE)
- Ideology: Communism; Republicanism
- Political position: Left-wing to Far-left
- National affiliation: United Left La Rioja (1986–present)
- Colours: Red

Website
- www.pce.es/larioja

The Communist Party of La Rioja (in Spanish: Partido Comunista de La Rioja) is the federation of the Communist Party of Spain (PCE) in La Rioja. The party was registered with the Spanish Ministry of Interior on November 13, 1986.

The general secretary of the party is Montserrat García.
