= 2019 Riojan regional election =

Election in the Spanish region of La Rioja

- 26 May 2019

All 33 seats in the Parliament of La Rioja 17 seats needed for a majority
- Opinion polls
- Registered: 249,863 ▲0.9%
- Turnout: 164,765 (65.9%) ▼1.4 pp
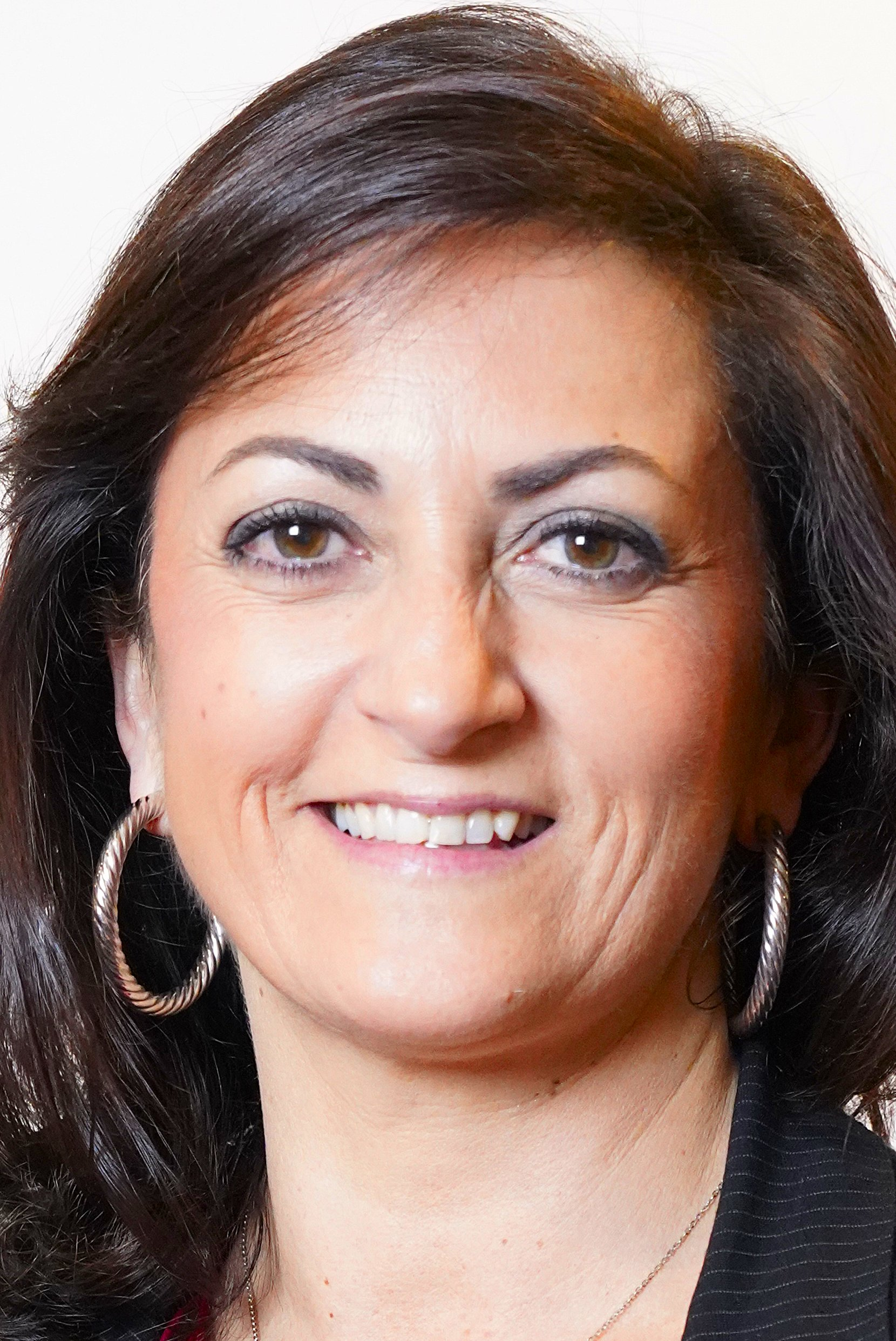

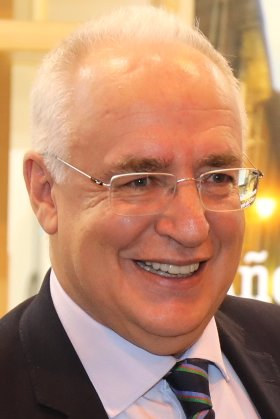

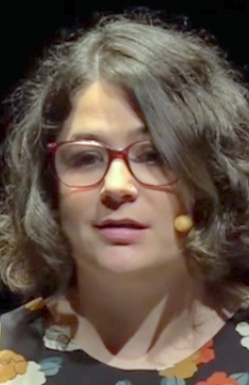
| | First party | Second party | Third party |
|---|---|---|---|
| Leader | Concha Andreu | José Ignacio Ceniceros | Pablo Baena |
| Party | PSOE | PP | Cs |
| Leader since | 19 October 2014 | 8 July 2015 | 9 March 2019 |
| Last election | 10 seats, 26.7% | 15 seats, 38.6% | 4 seats, 10.4% |
| Seats won | 15 | 12 | 4 |
| Seat change | ▲5 | ▼3 | 0 |
| Popular vote | 63,068 | 53,925 | 18,807 |
| Percentage | 38.7% | 33.1% | 11.5% |
| Swing | ▲12.0 pp | ▼5.5 pp | ▲1.1 pp |
| | Fourth party |
| Leader | Raquel Romero |
| Party | Podemos–IU–Equo |
| Leader since | 16 March 2019 |
| Last election | 4 seats, 15.4% (Note: Results for Podemos (11.2%, 4 seats) and CR–IU–Equo (4.2%, 0 seats) in the 2015 election.) |
| Seats won | 2 |
| Seat change | ▼2 |
| Popular vote | 10,844 |
| Percentage | 6.6% |
| Swing | ▼8.8 pp |
President before election
José Ignacio Ceniceros
PP
Elected President
Concha Andreu
PSOE

The 2019 Riojan regional election was held on 26 May 2019 to elect the 10th Parliament of the autonomous community of La Rioja. All 33 seats in the Parliament were up for election. It was held concurrently with regional elections in eleven other autonomous communities and local elections all throughout Spain, as well as the 2019 European Parliament election.

The election saw the Spanish Socialist Workers' Party (PSOE) becoming the most-voted political force in a regional election in La Rioja for the first time since 1991, allowing the party to elect her candidate, Concha Andreu, as new regional president through an alliance with Unidas Podemos. The ruling People's Party (PP), which had governed the region without interruption since 1995, obtained the worst result in its history.

== Overview ==
=== Electoral system ===
The Parliament of La Rioja was the devolved, unicameral legislature of the autonomous community of La Rioja, having legislative power in regional matters as defined by the Spanish Constitution and the Riojan Statute of Autonomy, as well as the ability to vote confidence in or withdraw it from a regional president. Voting for the Parliament was on the basis of universal suffrage, which comprised all nationals over 18 years of age, registered in La Rioja and in full enjoyment of their political rights. Additionally, Riojans abroad were required to apply for voting before being permitted to vote, a system known as "begged" or expat vote (Spanish: Voto rogado).

The 33 members of the Parliament of La Rioja were elected using the D'Hondt method and a closed list proportional representation, with an electoral threshold of five percent of valid votes—which included blank ballots—being applied regionally.

=== Election date ===
The term of the Parliament of La Rioja expired four years after the date of its previous election. Elections to the Parliament were fixed for the fourth Sunday of May every four years. The previous election was held on 24 May 2015, setting the election date for the Parliament on 26 May 2019.

The president had the prerogative to dissolve the Parliament of La Rioja and call a snap election, provided that no motion of no confidence was in process, no nationwide election was due and some time requirements were met: namely, that dissolution did not occur either during the first legislative session or within the legislature's last year ahead of its scheduled expiry, nor before one year had elapsed since a previous dissolution. In the event of an investiture process failing to elect a regional president within a two-month period from the first ballot, the Parliament was to be automatically dissolved and a fresh election called. Any snap election held as a result of these circumstances would not alter the period to the next ordinary election, with elected lawmakers serving the remainder of its original four-year term.

The election to the Parliament of La Rioja was officially triggered on 2 April 2019 after the publication of the election decree in the Official Gazette of La Rioja (BOR), scheduling for the chamber to convene on 20 June.

== Parties and candidates ==
The electoral law allowed for parties and federations registered in the interior ministry, coalitions and groupings of electors to present lists of candidates. Parties and federations intending to form a coalition ahead of an election were required to inform the relevant Electoral Commission within ten days of the election call, whereas groupings of electors needed to secure the signature of at least one percent of the electorate in La Rioja, disallowing electors from signing for more than one list of candidates.

Below is a list of the main parties and electoral alliances which contested the election:

| Candidacy | Parties and alliances | Leading candidate | Ideology | Previous result | | Gov. | Ref. |
| Candidacy | Parties and alliances | Leading candidate | Ideology | Vote % | Seats | Gov. | Ref. |
|---|---|---|---|---|---|---|---|
| PP | List: People's Party (PP) | José Ignacio Ceniceros | Conservatism; Christian democracy | 38.6% | 15 | Yes | |
| PSOE | List: Spanish Socialist Workers' Party (PSOE) | Concha Andreu | Social democracy | 26.7% | 10 | No | |
| Podemos– IU–Equo | List: We Can (Podemos); United Left (IU) – Communist Party of La Rioja (PCE–LR) – The Dawn Marxist Organization (La Aurora (OM)) – Republican Left (IR) – Feminist Party of Spain (PFE); Equo (Equo) | Raquel Romero | Left-wing populism Direct democracy Democratic socialism | 15.4% | 4 | No | |
| Cs | List: Citizens–Party of the Citizenry (Cs) | Pablo Baena | Liberalism | 10.4% | 4 | No | |
| PR+ | List: Riojan Party (PR+) | Julio Revuelta | Regionalism; Progressivism | 4.5% | 0 | No | |
| Vox | List: Vox (Vox) | Ignacio Asín | Right-wing populism Ultranationalism; National conservatism | —N/a | | No | |

== Opinion polls ==
The table below lists voting intention estimates in reverse chronological order, showing the most recent first and using the dates when the survey fieldwork was done, as opposed to the date of publication. Where the fieldwork dates are unknown, the date of publication is given instead. The highest percentage figure in each polling survey is displayed with its background shaded in the leading party's colour. If a tie ensues, this is applied to the figures with the highest percentages. The "Lead" column on the right shows the percentage-point difference between the parties with the highest percentages in a poll. When available, seat projections determined by the polling organisations are displayed below (or in place of) the percentages in a smaller font; 17 seats were required for an absolute majority in the Parliament of La Rioja.

Color key:

Poll conducted after legal ban on opinion polls

| Polling firm/Commissioner | Fieldwork date | Sample size | Turnout | PP | PSOE | Podemos | Cs | PR+ | IU | Unidas Podemos | Vox | Lead |
|---|---|---|---|---|---|---|---|---|---|---|---|---|
| 2019 regional election | 26 May 2019 | —N/a | 65.9 | 33.1; 12 | 38.7; 15 | (Note: Within Unidas Podemos.) | 11.5; 4 | 4.6; 0 | | 6.6; 2 | 3.9; 0 | 5.6 |
| ElectoPanel/Electomanía | 22–23 May 2019 | ? | ? | 25.3; 9 | 32.4; 12 | | 16.7; 6 | 6.3; 2 | | 10.6; 3 | 5.4; 1 | 7.1 |
| ElectoPanel/Electomanía | 21–22 May 2019 | ? | ? | 25.6; 9 | 32.6; 12 | | 16.4; 6 | 6.4; 2 | | 10.4; 3 | 5.2; 1 | 7.0 |
| ElectoPanel/Electomanía | 20–21 May 2019 | ? | ? | 25.9; 9 | 32.2; 12 | | 16.0; 6 | 6.7; 2 | | 10.6; 3 | 5.2; 1 | 6.3 |
| ElectoPanel/Electomanía | 19–20 May 2019 | ? | ? | 25.4; 9 | 32.1; 11 | | 16.1; 6 | 7.0; 2 | | 10.9; 4 | 5.1; 1 | 6.7 |
| NC Report/La Razón | 19 May 2019 | ? | ? | 26.2; 9 | 32.1; 11 | | ? 5 | ? 2 | | ? 4 | ? 2 | 5.9 |
| ElectoPanel/Electomanía | 16–19 May 2019 | ? | ? | 25.2; 9 | 32.2; 11 | | 16.5; 6 | 6.8; 2 | | 11.1; 4 | 4.9; 1 | 7.0 |
| ElectoPanel/Electomanía | 13–16 May 2019 | ? | ? | 23.6; 8 | 30.9; 11 | | 18.3; 6 | 6.7; 2 | | 12.0; 4 | 6.0; 2 | 7.3 |
| GAD3/Diario La Rioja | 14–15 May 2019 | 800 | ? | 29.2; 10/11 | 37.5; 13/14 | | 11.5; 3/4 | 5.6; 1/2 | | 7.8; 2/3 | 6.0; 1/2 | 8.3 |
| ElectoPanel/Electomanía | 10–13 May 2019 | ? | ? | 22.8; 8 | 29.7; 10 | | 19.2; 7 | 6.6; 2 | | 12.6; 4 | 6.6; 2 | 6.9 |
| ElectoPanel/Electomanía | 7–10 May 2019 | ? | ? | 22.0; 7 | 30.3; 11 | | 19.9; 7 | 6.3; 2 | | 12.4; 4 | 6.1; 2 | 8.3 |
| ElectoPanel/Electomanía | 4–7 May 2019 | ? | ? | 21.3; 7 | 29.8; 11 | | 20.9; 7 | 5.5; 2 | | 12.5; 4 | 6.4; 2 | 8.5 |
| NueveCuatroUno | 29 Apr–5 May 2019 | 800 | ? | 29.5– 30.0; 11 | 32.0– 34.0; 13 | | 10.5– 11.2; 4 | 6.8– 7.4; 2 | | 9.5– 11.0; 3 | 3.7; 0 | 2.5– 4.0 |
| ElectoPanel/Electomanía | 29 Apr–4 May 2019 | ? | ? | 22.3; 8 | 29.8; 11 | | 20.9; 7 | 5.1; 1 | | 12.5; 4 | 5.8; 2 | 7.5 |
| April 2019 general election | 28 Apr 2019 | —N/a | 73.4 | 26.5 (9) | 31.7 (11) | | 17.8 (6) | 1.2 (0) | | 11.8 (4) | 9.0 (3) | 5.2 |
| CIS | 21 Mar–23 Apr 2019 | 295 | ? | 30.9; 11/13 | 36.0; 12/14 | | 10.5; 3/4 | 7.4; 2/3 | | 7.8; 2/3 | 2.3; 0 | 5.1 |
| ElectoPanel/Electomanía | 31 Mar–7 Apr 2019 | ? | ? | 21.0; 8 | 27.4; 10 | | 14.9; 5 | 6.3; 2 | | 12.2; 4 | 11.7; 4 | 6.4 |
| ElectoPanel/Electomanía | 24–31 Mar 2019 | ? | ? | 20.3; 7 | 27.5; 10 | | 15.6; 6 | 6.6; 2 | | 12.1; 4 | 11.8; 4 | 7.2 |
| ElectoPanel/Electomanía | 17–24 Mar 2019 | ? | ? | 20.6; 7 | 28.3; 10 | | 15.7; 6 | 6.4; 2 | | 11.7; 4 | 11.5; 4 | 7.7 |
| ElectoPanel/Electomanía | 10–17 Mar 2019 | ? | ? | 21.1; 7 | 26.8; 10 | | 14.9; 5 | 6.0; 2 | | 11.8; 4 | 13.6; 5 | 5.7 |
| ElectoPanel/Electomanía | 3–10 Mar 2019 | ? | ? | 20.7; 7 | 26.4; 10 | | 15.6; 5 | 6.1; 2 | | 12.0; 4 | 13.5; 5 | 5.7 |
| ElectoPanel/Electomanía | 22 Feb–3 Mar 2019 | ? | ? | 20.3; 7 | 26.2; 9 | | 16.1; 6 | 6.2; 2 | | 12.1; 4 | 13.2; 5 | 5.9 |
| SyM Consulting | 3–6 May 2018 | 1,300 | 72.5 | 34.7; 13/14 | 23.6; 9 | 10.2; 3/4 | 18.6; 7 | 4.8; 0 | 4.5; 0 | – | – | 11.1 |
| NueveCuatroUno | 2–6 May 2018 | 973 | ? | 30.0; 10 | 27.4; 10 | 8.2; 3 | 25.5; 9 | 5.1; 1 | – | – | – | 2.6 |
| NueveCuatroUno | 8–13 May 2017 | 448 | ? | 38.8; 13/14 | 24.8; 8 | 11.7; 4 | 11.2; 4 | 8.6; 3 | 4.8; 0/1 | – | – | 14.0 |
| 2016 general election | 26 Jun 2016 | —N/a | 70.6 | 42.6 (15) | 24.3 (8) | | 14.0 (5) | – | | 16.6 (5) | 0.2 (0) | 18.3 |
| 2015 general election | 20 Dec 2015 | —N/a | 72.4 | 38.3 (14) | 23.7 (8) | 15.8 (6) | 15.1 (5) | – | 4.2 (0) | – | – | 14.6 |
| 2015 regional election | 24 May 2015 | —N/a | 67.3 | 38.6; 15 | 26.7; 10 | 11.2; 4 | 10.4; 4 | 4.5; 0 | 4.2; 0 | – | – | 11.9 |

== Results ==
← Summary of the 26 May 2019 Parliament of La Rioja election results →
| Parties and alliances | Popular vote | | | Seats | |
| Parties and alliances | Votes | % | ±pp | Total | +/− |
|---|---|---|---|---|---|
| Spanish Socialist Workers' Party (PSOE) | 63,068 | 38.67 | +11.93 | 15 | +5 |
| People's Party (PP) | 53,925 | 33.06 | −5.56 | 12 | −3 |
| Citizens–Party of the Citizenry (Cs) | 18,807 | 11.53 | +1.10 | 4 | ±0 |
| United We Can–United Left–Equo (Podemos–IU–Equo)^{1} | 10,844 | 6.65 | −8.72 | 2 | −2 |
| Riojan Party (PR+) | 7,512 | 4.61 | +0.16 | 0 | ±0 |
| Vox (Vox) | 6,314 | 3.87 | New | 0 | ±0 |
| Animalist Party Against Mistreatment of Animals (PACMA) | 1,078 | 0.66 | −0.08 | 0 | ±0 |
| Blank ballots | 1,555 | 0.95 | −0.85 | | |
| Total | 163,103 | | | 33 | ±0 |
| Valid votes | 163,103 | 98.99 | +0.96 | | |
| Invalid votes | 1,662 | 1.01 | −0.96 | | |
| Votes cast / turnout | 164,765 | 65.94 | −1.35 | | |
| Abstentions | 85,098 | 34.06 | +1.35 | | |
| Registered voters | 249,863 | | | | |
Sources
Footnotes: ^{1} United We Can–United Left–Equo results are compared to the combined totals of We Can and Change La Rioja–United Left–Equo in the 2015 election.

Popular vote
| PSOE | 38.67% |
| PP | 33.06% |
| Cs | 11.53% |
| Unidas Podemos | 6.65% |
| PR+ | 4.61% |
| Vox | 3.87% |
| PACMA | 0.66% |
| Blank ballots | 0.95% |

Seats
| PSOE | 45.45% |
| PP | 36.36% |
| Cs | 12.12% |
| Unidas Podemos | 6.06% |

== Aftermath ==
Investiture; Concha Andreu (PSOE)
| Ballot → | 16 July 2019 | 18 July 2019 |
| Required majority → | 17 out of 33 | Simple |
| Yes: • PSOE (15); • IU (1) | 16 / 33 | 16 / 33 |
| No: • PP (12); • Cs (4); • Podemos (1) | 17 / 33 | 17 / 33 |
| Abstentions | 0 / 33 | 0 / 33 |
| Absentees | 0 / 33 | 0 / 33 |

Investiture; Concha Andreu (PSOE)
| Ballot → | 27 August 2019 |
| Required majority → | 17 out of 33 |
| Yes: • PSOE (15); • IU (1); • Podemos (1) | 17 / 33 |
| No: • PP (12); • Cs (4) | 16 / 33 |
| Abstentions | 0 / 33 |
| Absentees | 0 / 33 |
