= Gonzalo Capellán =

Spanish politician (born 1972)

The Most Excellent Gonzalo Capellán
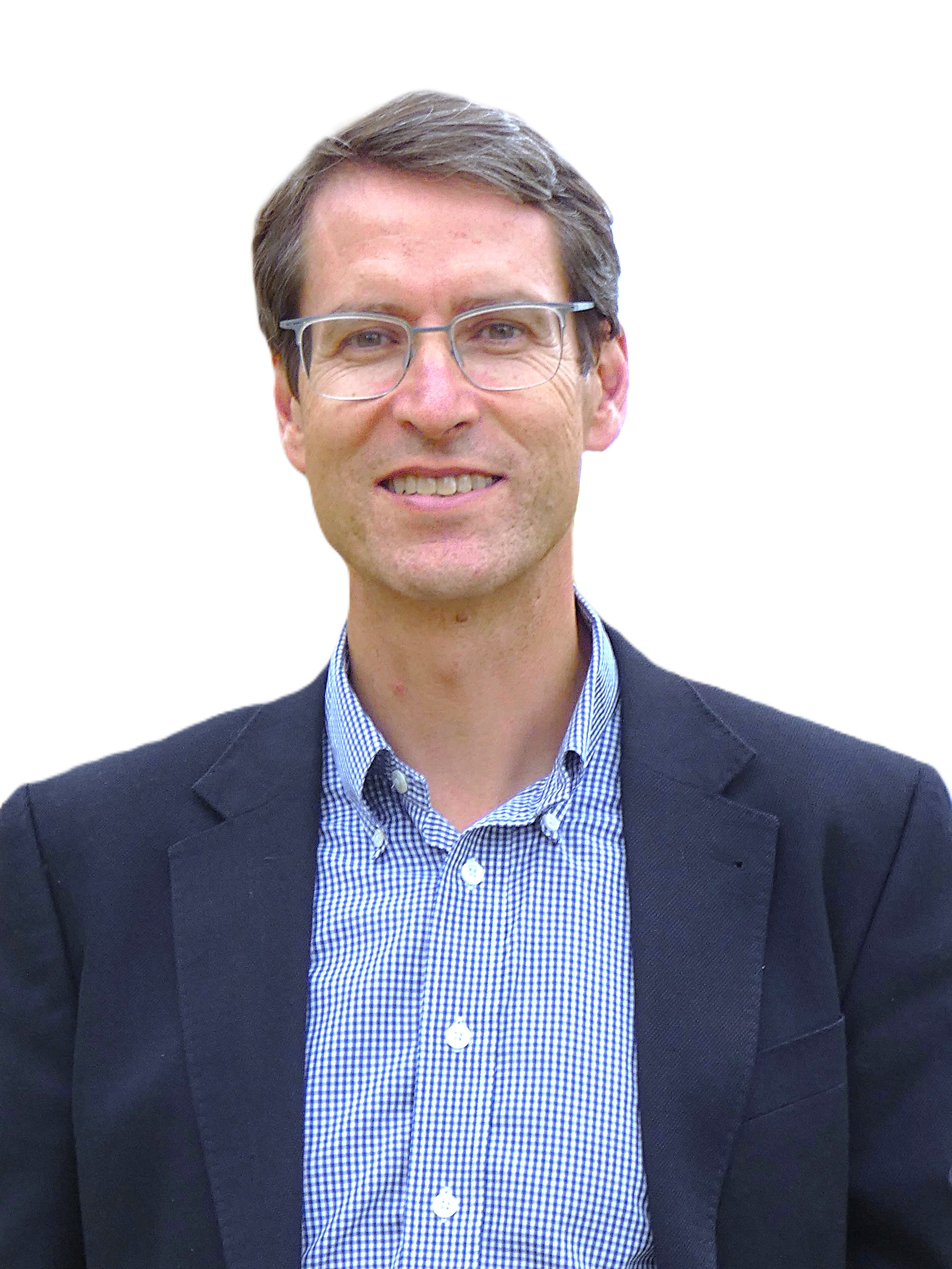

President of La Rioja
- Incumbent
- Assumed office 29 June 2023
- Preceded by: Concha Andreu

Personal details
- Born: 23 January 1972 Haro, Spain
- Party: People's Party
- Education: University of Cantabria

Gonzalo Capellán de Miguel (born 23 January 1972) is a Spanish academic and People's Party (PP) politician. He led the party in the 2023 Riojan regional election, in which they won a majority and he became President of La Rioja.

== Biography ==
Capellán was born in Haro, La Rioja. His father Patricio, who died in 2016, was the town's mayor from 1987 to 2015, representing the People's Party (PP). He graduated in history and geography from the University of Cantabria and became a lecturer at the University of La Rioja.

Capellán was elected to the Parliament of La Rioja in 2007. He resigned in September 2008 due to his responsibilities as vice-rector of the University of Cantabria. Having already been La Rioja's director general of culture between 2003 and 2007, he was named Minister of Education, Culture and Tourism in the cabinet of Pedro Sanz in June 2011. He left in November 2014 to be Minister of Education for the Spanish embassy in the United Kingdom.

In 2020, Capellán returned to Spain and in February 2022 he was promoted to Professor of Contemporary History at the University of La Rioja. That October, he was chosen as the PP candidate for the 2023 Riojan regional election by the party's national leader, Alberto Núñez Feijóo. His party won 17 of 33 seats, winning back the government from the Spanish Socialist Workers' Party (PSOE) after four years. He was officially elected the 9th President of La Rioja on 28 June, with his party voting in favour and all other parties against.
