= United Left La Rioja =

United Left La Rioja Izquierda Unida La Rioja
- Spokesperson: Diego Mendiola
- Headquarters: C/ Portales 36, 1º. 26003 Logroño
- Ideology: Democratic socialism Anti-capitalism; Republicanism; Federalism; Environmentalism; Secularism
- Political position: Left-wing
- National affiliation: United Left
- Parliament of La Rioja: 1 / 33
- Mayors: 1 / 174
- Local seats (2019-2023): 10 / 1,032 (Note: Candidates gained in coalitions or unitary lists not included.)

Website
- www.iularioja.org/web/

United Left La Rioja (Spanish: Izquierda Unida La Rioja, IU–La Rioja) is the regional branch of United Left (a political coalition that was organised in 1986) in the autonomous community of La Rioja.
