= Concha Andreu =

Spanish oenologist and politician

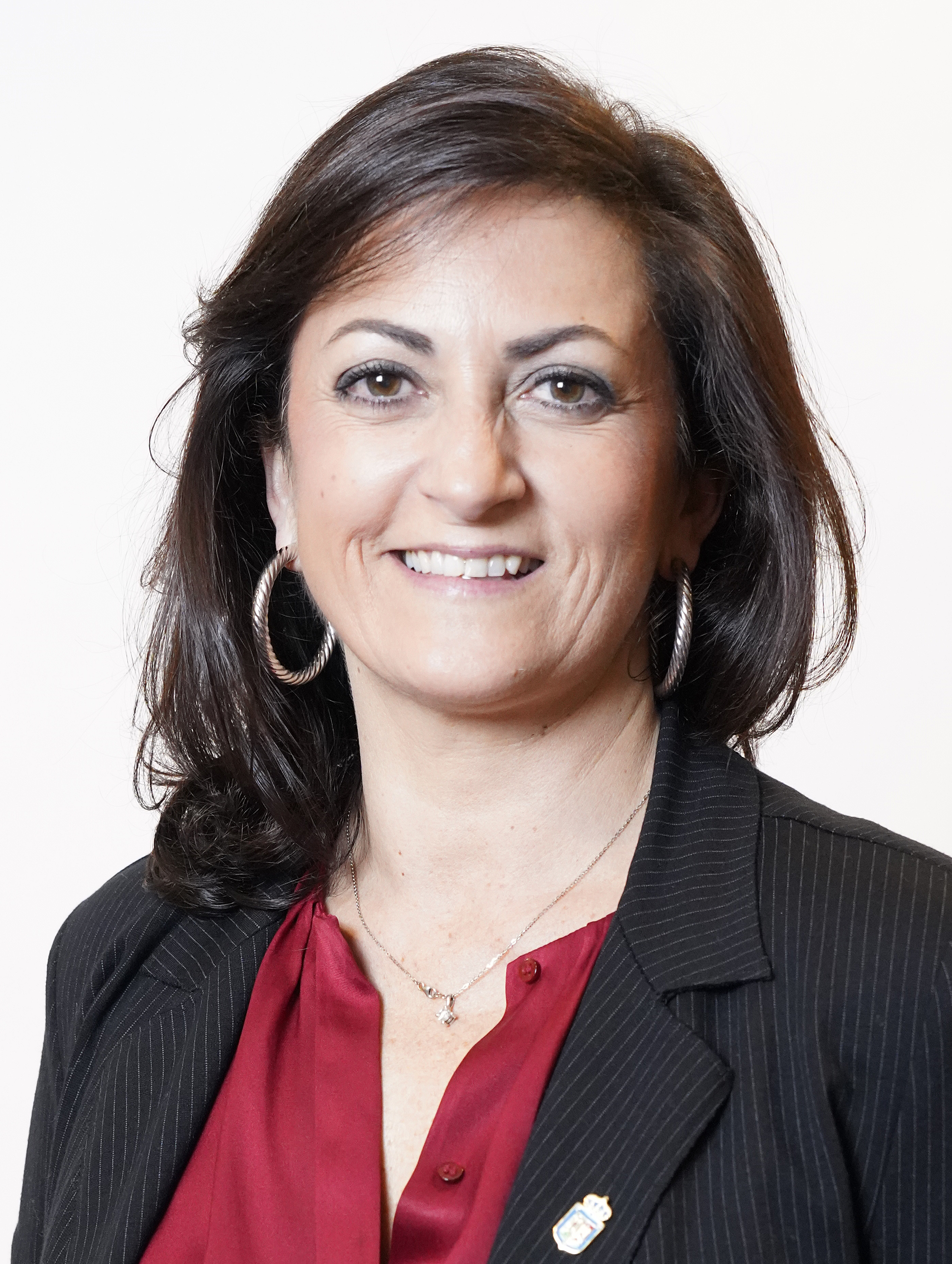

President of La Rioja
- In office 29 August 2019 – 29 June 2023
- Preceded by: José Ignacio Ceniceros
- Succeeded by: Gonzalo Capellán

Second Vice President of the Senate of Spain
- Incumbent
- Assumed office 21 October 2025
- Preceded by: Guillermo Fernández Vara

Secretary-General of the Socialist Workers' Party of La Rioja
- In office 31 October 2021 – 15 February 2025
- Preceded by: Francisco Ocón
- Succeeded by: Javier García Ibáñez

Member of the Parliament of La Rioja
- In office 16 June 2011 – 20 June 2024

Member of the Senate
- Incumbent
- Assumed office 17 August 2023
- Constituency: La Rioja

Personal details
- Born: Concepción Andreu Rodríguez; 10 March 1967 (age 59) Calahorra, La Rioja, Spain
- Party: Spanish Socialist Workers' Party
- Education: University of Salamanca; University of Zaragoza
- Profession: Oenologist

Concepción "Concha" Andreu Rodríguez (born 10 March 1967) is a Spanish oenologist and politician who served as the President of La Rioja from 2019 to 2023. From 2011 to 2024 she was a member of the Parliament of La Rioja.

== Biography ==
Andreu was born in 1967 in Calahorra. She studied biological sciences at the University of Salamanca and obtained a master's degree in viticulture and oenology from the University of Zaragoza.

She obtained a seat at the Parliament of La Rioja in 2011. In the 2015 Riojan regional election, Andreu was the candidate of the Spanish Socialist Workers' Party (PSOE) for President of La Rioja, and PSOE obtained 10 seats out of 33, while the People's Party (PP) obtained 15. Andreu was subsequently the parliament spokesperson for PSOE.

In the 2019 Riojan regional election, Andreu repeated as PSOE's candidate for President of La Rioja. PSOE obtained 15 seats out of 33, becoming the largest party in the Parliament of La Rioja for the first time since the 1991 election. On 27 August, Andreu was invested president after reaching an agreement with Podemos and United Left. Andreu is the first woman to hold the office of President of La Rioja.

In the 2023 Spanish general election she was elected to the 15th Senate of Spain from La Rioja.
