= Bridge of Mantible =

- Puente Mantible (Spanish)
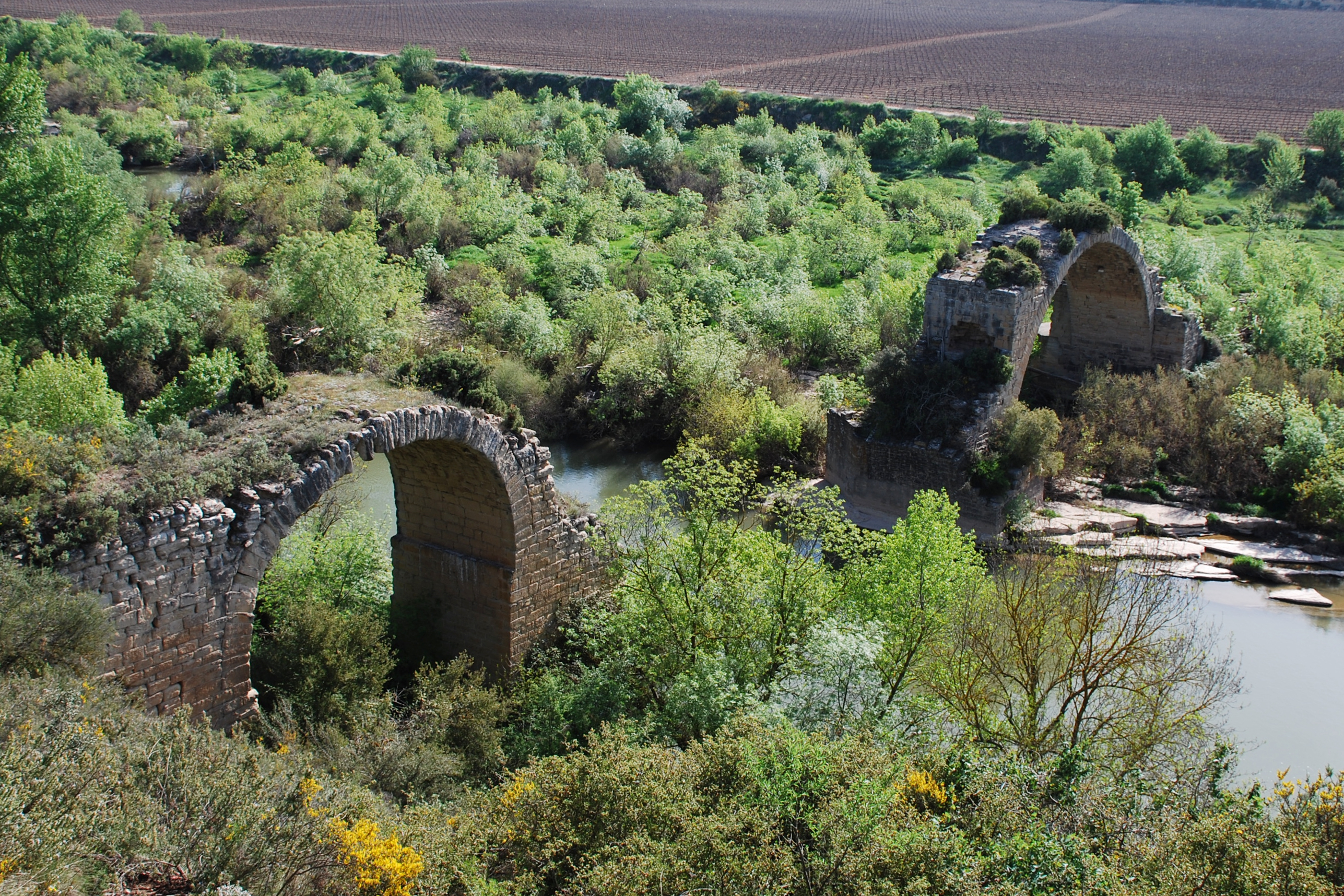

- Location within Spain
- 42.510026°N 2.507931°W
- Location: La Rioja and the Basque Country, Spain

History
- Built: X or XI century—?

Spanish Cultural Heritage
- Official name: Puente Mantible
- Type: Non-movable
- Criteria: Monument
- Designated: 1983
- Reference no.: RI-51-0004791

The Bridge of Mantible (Spanish: Puente Mantible) is a ruined bridge located near Logroño, Spain. It crosses the Ebro river between La Rioja and the Basque Country, connecting El Cortijo and Laserna.

According to some historians, construction of the bridge began in the first half of the 2nd century, well into Rome's imperial period. Others suggest that the bridge was built in the 11th century, near the same time in which the Puente La Reina was constructed over the River Arga, and that both were made to join the two most important cities of the Kingdom of Navarre, Nájera and Pamplona.

Neither theory makes clear at what point the bridge became no longer passable, but there are documents that suggest that it had already fully deteriorated by halfway through the 16th century.

The bridge is 164 meters long, 5 meters wide and reaches a maximum height of 30 meters. It was built with seven semicircular arches, only two of which stand relatively intact today. There are only a few remains of the other five arches. The two standing arches serve as an example of the excellent quarry stone used in the bridge.

It was declared Bien de Interés Cultural in 1983.

== Dating ==
Manuel A. Martín Bueno and José Gabriel Moya Valgañón, like other authors, classify this bridge as a Roman bridge and date it around the 2nd century AD. However, today we know this is not accurate. Isaac Moreno Gallo, after comparing the structural characteristics of this bridge with the one in Puente la Reina (Navarra), concludes that it is a medieval bridge. Both bridges were constructed in the 11th century to connect two cities of the powerful medieval kingdom, Nájera and Pamplona, and it's highly likely that they were constructed by the same individuals.
