= Santaolalla (disambiguation) =

Santaolalla or Santa Olalla may refer to:

== People ==
- Gustavo Santaolalla, Argentine musician
- Javier Santaolalla, Spanish scientist
- Marta Santaolalla, Spanish actress

== Places ==
- Santa Olalla, a village in the autonomous community of Castile-La Mancha, Spain
- Santa Olalla de Bureba, a municipality in Castile and León, Spain
- Santa Olalla del Cala, a village in Andalusia, Spain
