= Theatre of Bretón de los Herreros =

- Teatro Bretón de los Herreros (Spanish)
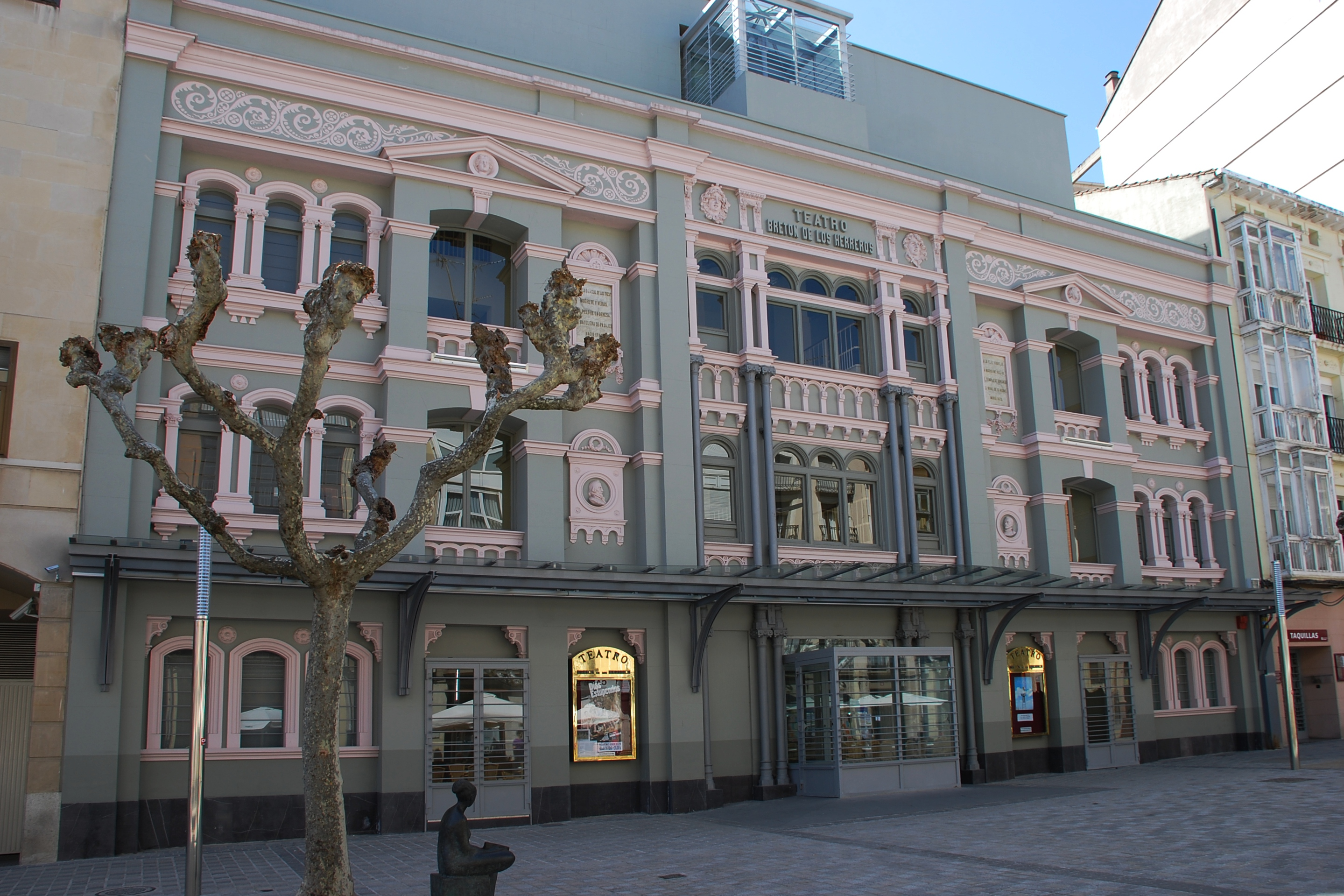

- Location within Spain
- 42.465°N 2.44833°W
- Location: Logroño, Spain

Spanish Cultural Heritage
- Official name: Teatro Bretón de los Herreros
- Type: Non-movable
- Criteria: Monument
- Designated: 1983
- Reference no.: RI-51-0004927

The Theatre of Bretón de los Herreros (Spanish: Teatro Bretón de los Herreros) is a nineteenth-century theatre located in Logroño, Spain. The theatre has had its present name since 1902 when it was renamed in honour of Manuel Bretón de los Herreros. It was declared Bien de Interés Cultural (Cultural property of Spain) in 1983.
