= Muralla del Revellín =

Fortification of Revellín
- Muralla del Revellín (Spanish)
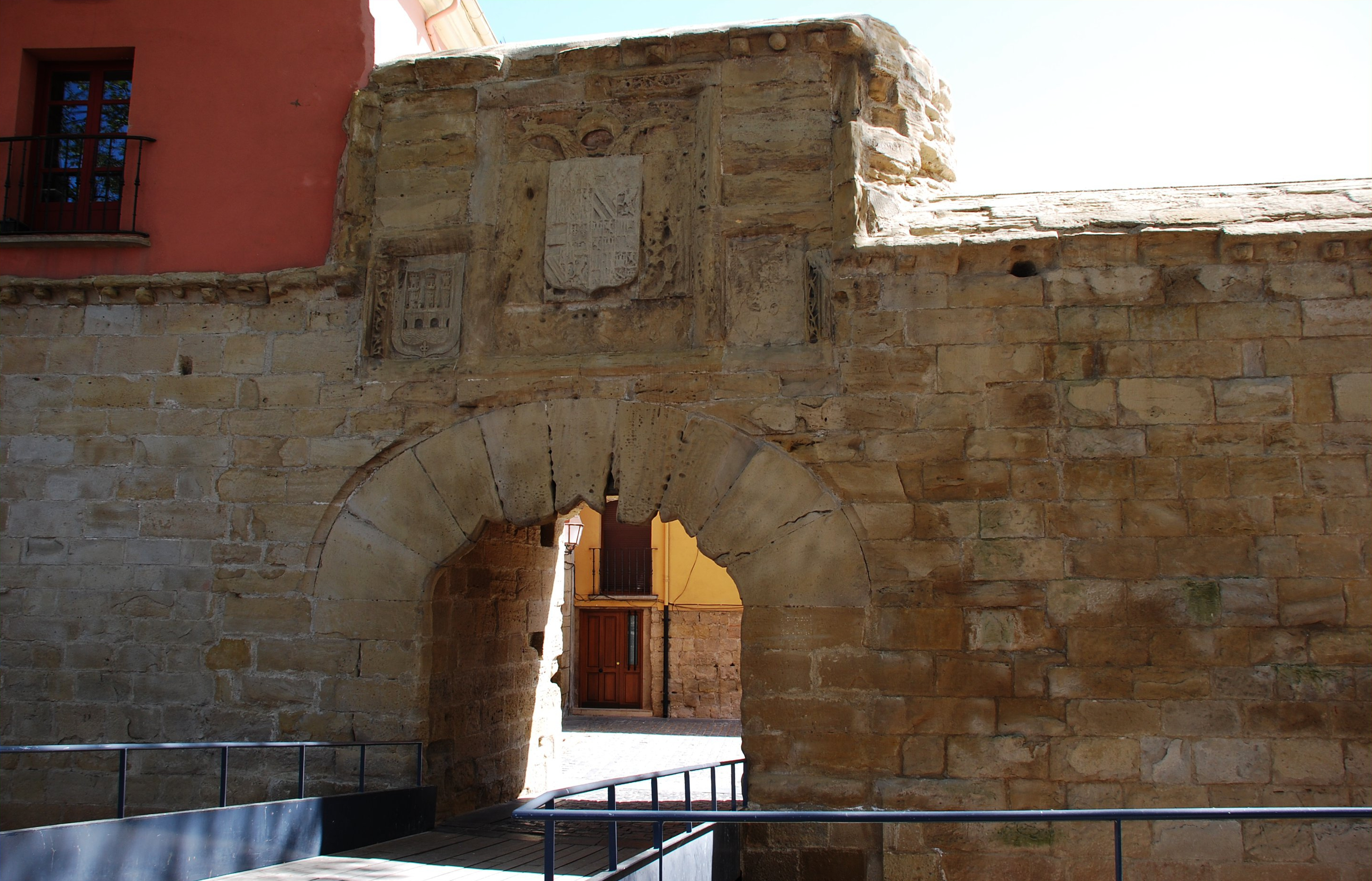
- Arch of the western gate of the Muralla del Revellín of Logroño
- Interactive map of Fortification of Revellín
- Type: defensive wall

History
- Built: 1522

The fortification of Revellín, Spanish: muralla del Revellín, are the remains of the fortifications of the city of Logroño, whose west-facing gate is preserved. The most important part of the fortification process took place between 1498 and 1540, reinforcing the old middle age wall.

After the revolt of the Comuneros, the troops of Francis I of France led by general Asparrot sieged the city on May 25, 1521 being responsible of its defense captain Vélez de Guevara. But the construction of the wall and the gate which are visible today started in 1522, one year after the siege.

After the second half of the 16th century, its role in the city defense started to decline, which resulted in a noticeable deterioration of the walls. Private buildings were built against its walls, which did not prevent its conservation to our days.

== Celebration of San Bernabé ==
During the fiestas of San Bernabé the Fish brotherhood offers the citizens a serving of fish, remembering the siege Logroño was under by the french-navarre army in the year 1521 and which the inhabitants endured feeding on fishes coming from the Ebro river.
