= Manuel Bretón de los Herreros =

Spanish dramatist (1796–1873)

The Most Excellent Manuel Bretón de los Herreros
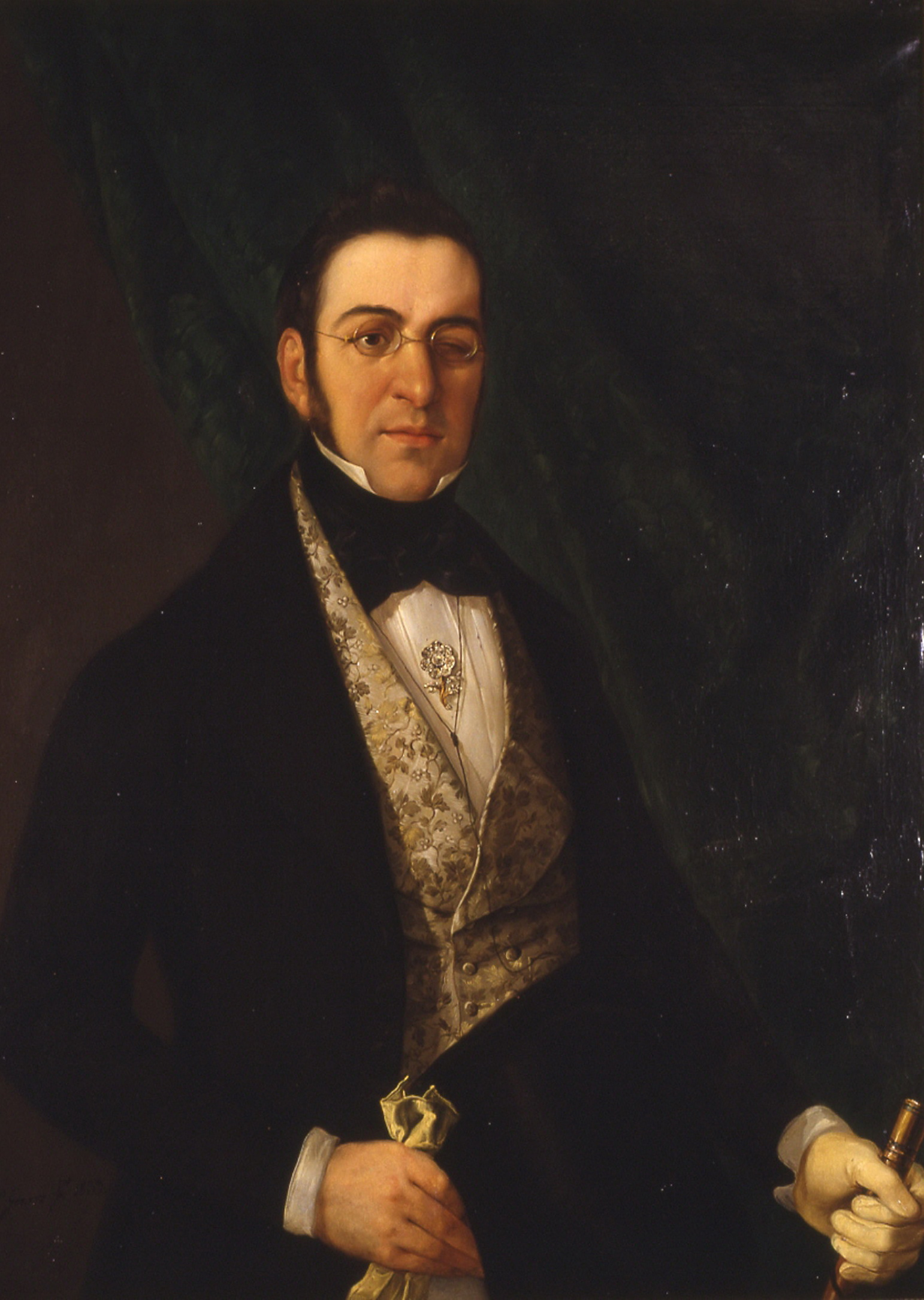
- Born: 19 December 1796; Quel, Spain
- Died: 8 November 1873 (aged 76); Madrid, Spain

Seat B of the Real Academia Española
- In office 1840 – 8 November 1873
- Preceded by: Eugenio de Guzmán
- Succeeded by: Eduardo Saavedra

Manuel Bretón de los Herreros (19 December 1796 – 8 November 1873) was a Spanish dramatist.

== Biography ==
He was born in Quel (Logroño), and was educated at Madrid. Enlisting on 24 May 1812, he served against the French in Valencia and Catalonia, and retired with the rank of corporal on 8 March 1822. He lost his left eye in a duel he held in 1818 in Jerez de la Frontera. He obtained a minor post in the civil service under the liberal government, and on his discharge determined to earn his living by writing for the stage.

His first piece, Á la vejez viruelas, was produced on 4 October 1824, and proved the writer to be the legitimate successor of the younger Moratín. His industry was astonishing: between October 1824 and November 1828, he composed thirty-nine plays, six of them original, the rest being translations or recasts of classic masterpieces. In 1831, he published a translation of Tibullus, and acquired by it an unmerited reputation for scholarship which secured for him an appointment as sub-librarian at the national library. But the theatre claimed him for its own, and with the exception of Elena and a few other pieces in the fashionable romantic vein, his plays were a long series of successes. His only serious check occurred in 1840; the formerly more liberal government had grown conservative, and when in La Ponchada the author ridiculed the National Guard.

He was dismissed from the national library, and for a short time was so unpopular that he seriously thought of emigrating to America; but the storm blew over, and within two years Bretón de los Herreros had regained his supremacy on the stage. He became secretary to the Royal Spanish Academy, quarrelled with his fellow-members, and died at Madrid. He is the author of some 360 original plays, twenty-three of which are in prose.

== Legacy ==
According to the Encyclopædia Britannica Eleventh Edition, "[n]o Spanish dramatist of the nineteenth century approaches him in comic power, in festive invention, and in the humorous presentation of character, while his metrical dexterity is unique. that Marcela, o ¿a cuál de los tres? (1831), Muérete y verás! (1837) and La Escuela del matrimonio (1852) still hold the stage [as of 1911], and are likely to hold it so long as Spanish is spoken".

The Theatre of Bretón de los Herreros in Logroño is named after him.

== Selected works ==
- A la vejez, viruelas (1817) (In Old Age, Chickenpox)
- Los dos sobrinos o la escuela de los parientes (1825)
- A Madrid me vuelvo (1828)
- El ensayo (1828)
- El rival de sí mismo (1828)
- El ingenuo (1828)
- El templo de Himeneo (1829)
- Achaques a los vicios (1830)
- La sorpresa (1830)
- La falsa ilustración (1830)
- Marcela o ¿a cuál de los tres? (1831)
- Elena (1834)
- Todo es farsa en este mundo (1835)
- Me voy de Madrid (1836)
- La redacción de un periódico (1836)
- Muérete, ¡y verás! (1837)
- Don Fernando el Emplazado (1837)
- Vellido Dolfos (1839)
- El pelo de la dehesa (1840)
- La Ponchada (1840)
- Don Frutos en Belchite (1845)
- El valor de la mujer (1852)
- La escuela del matrimonio (1852)
- La niña del mostrador (1854)
- Al pie de la letra (1855)
- El abogado de pobres (1866)
- Los sentidos corporales (1867)
