= Eduardo Saavedra =

Spanish engineer and architect (1829–1912)

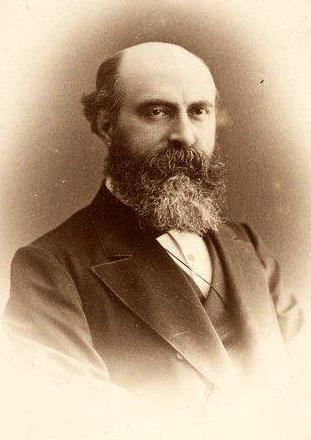
- Born: Eduardo Saavedra y Moragas; 27 February 1829; Tarragona, Spain
- Died: 12 March 1912 (aged 83); Madrid, Spain

Seat B of the Real Academia Española
- In office 29 December 1878 – 12 March 1912
- Preceded by: Manuel Bretón de los Herreros
- Succeeded by: Ricardo León y Román

Eduardo Saavedra y Moragas (27 February 1829 in Tarragona – 12 March 1912 in Madrid), Spanish engineer, architect, archaeologist and Arabist, member of the Real Academia de la Historia, Spanish Royal Academy of Sciences, Real Academia Española and cofounder-president of the Real Sociedad Geográfica.

== Biography ==
In 1857 Eduardo Saavedra designed the Chipiona Lighthouse, the highest lighthouse in Spain. In 1860 he discovered Numantia ruins in the province of Soria and was the chairman of the committee that dealt with the archaeological excavations. While working on the project of roads between Soria and the Burgo de Osma-Ciudad de Osma he discovered the Roman road between Uxama Argaela and Augustóbriga.

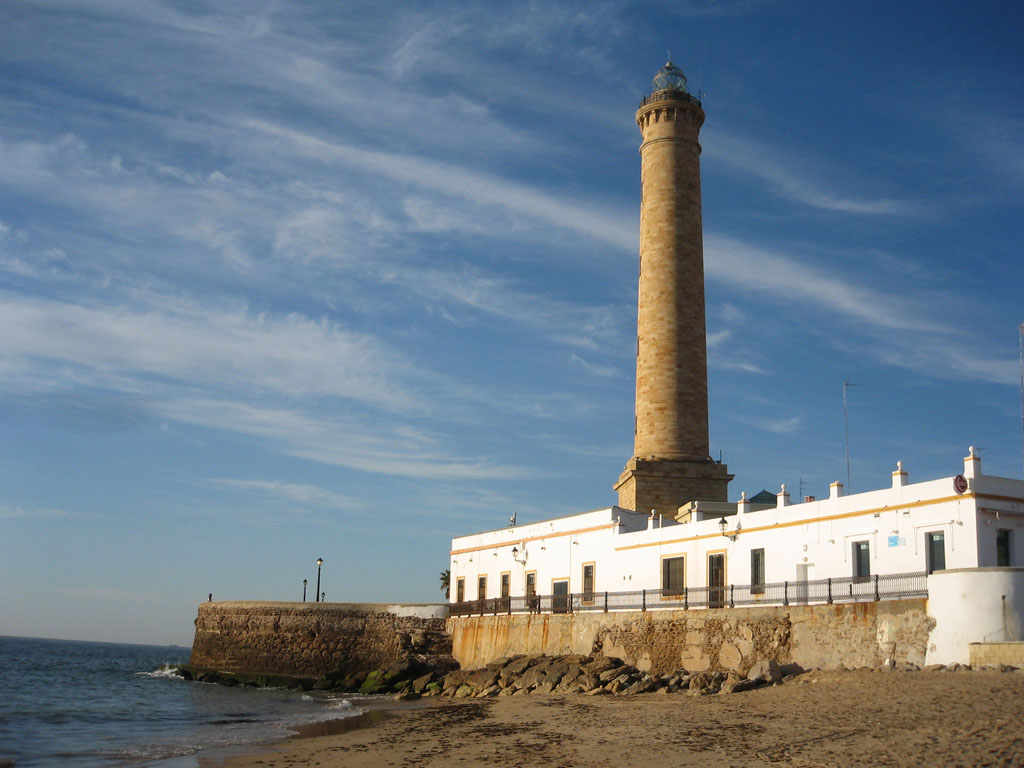
Lighthouse of Chipiona, project by Eduardo Saavedra

== Archeological Studies ==
- "Descripción de la vía romana entre Uxama y Augustóbriga", en Memorias de la Real Academia de la Historia, vol. 9, 1879

=== Arabic Studies ===
- La Geografía de España de El Idrisí, Madrid, 1881.
- Intereses de España en Marruecos, Madrid, 1884.
- Estudio sobre la invasión de los árabes en España, Madrid, 1891.
- La mujer mozárabe, Madrid, 1904.

== Bibliography ==
- Guijarro, Luis (2006). «Castilla y León, con el sello de norte». Revista del Ministerio de Fomento (553) (Ministerio de Fomento). pp. 80–95. ISSN 1577-4589.
- Mañas Martínez, José (1983), Eduardo Saavedra, Ingeniero y Humanista; prólogo de Julio Caro Baroja, Madrid:Turner-Colegio de Ingenieros de Caminos, Canales y Puertos.
- Manzanares de Cirre, Manuela (1972), Arabistas españoles del siglo XIX, Madrid, Instituto Hispano-Árabe de Cultura.
- Pasamar Alzuria, Gonzalo; Peiró Martín, Ignacio (2002). Diccionario Akal de Historiadores españoles contemporáneos. Ediciones Akal. ISBN 9788446014898.
