= Pablo Hermoso de Mendoza =

Spanish economist (born 1972)

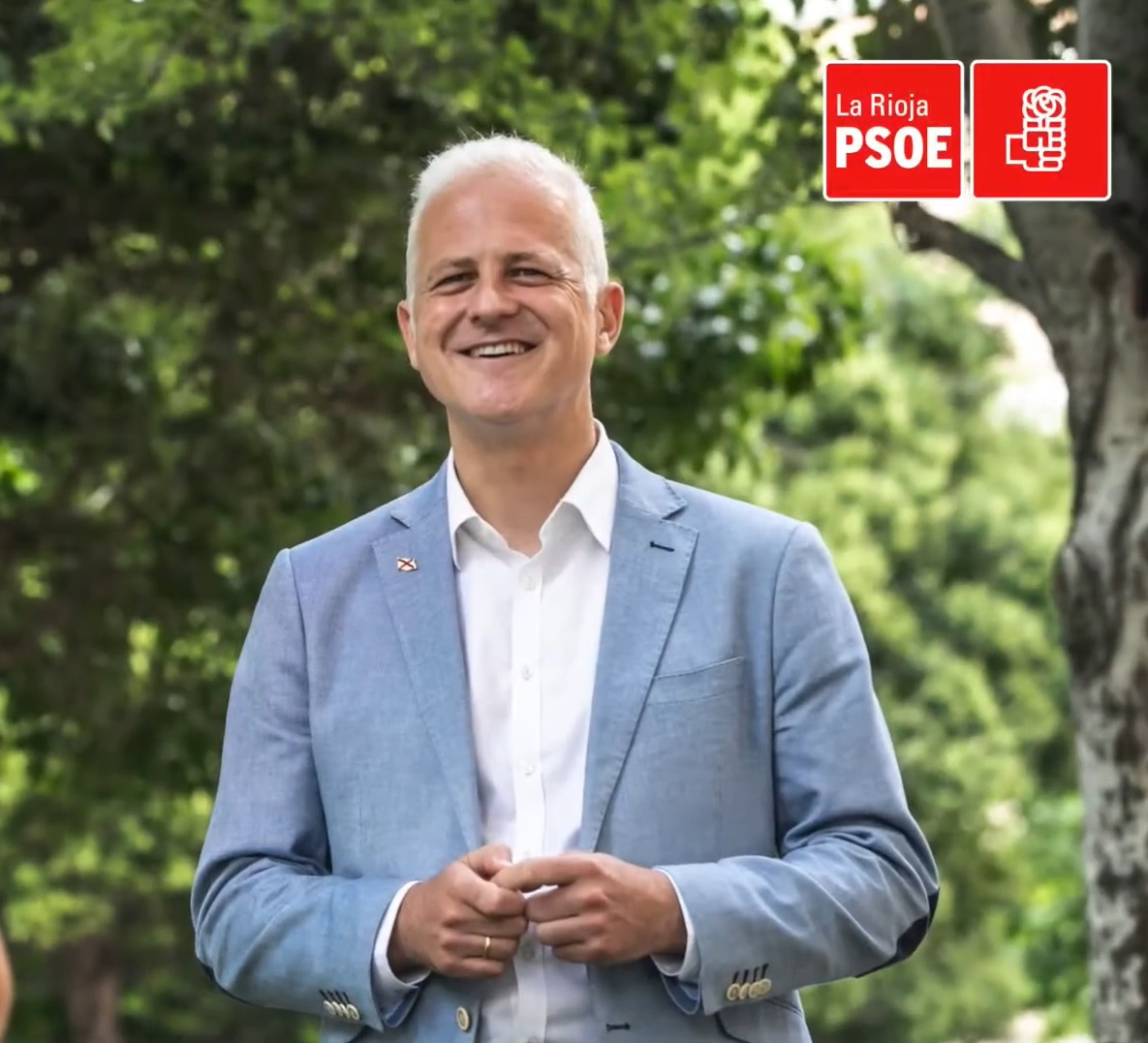

Pablo José Hermoso de Mendoza González (born 1972) is a Spanish economist and politician from the Spanish Socialist Workers' Party (PSOE). He was mayor of Logroño from 2019 to 2023.

== Biography ==
Hermoso de Mendoza was born in Logroño. When he was eighteen, his father died. His mother supported the family (Pablo and his brother) by running the family business.

Hermoso de Mendoza's grandmother Nieves Echániz Beitia moved to the city from Deba in Gipuzkoa. due to oppression for her socialist, republican and pro-Spanish views. She had previously been in exile in Venezuela and Paris. She was a supporter of the Spanish Socialist Workers' Party (PSOE) and its leader Felipe González, and cried in 1982 when he won a parliamentary majority. The previous year, the family had prepared to flee to France due to the 1981 Spanish coup attempt.

== Education and Professional Development ==
He holds a degree in Economics (specializing in Applied Economics) from the University of Zaragoza. He completed his final year of studies at the University of Trier (Germany). He then continued his education with a master's degree in International Marketing and Foreign Trade. With this training, he was appointed sales manager for the German market in the HORECA, DIY, and home improvement sectors at Araven Group (1998–1999).

He returned to Logroño, where he began working as head of the Training and Employment department at the Federation of Employers of La Rioja from 1999 to 2006. In 2006, he was appointed head of the Innovation and Technology department, after training as an expert in R&D&I Management. He held this position from 2006 to 2009, encouraging and promoting innovation within companies in La Rioja. During this period, he was a member of the Social Council of the University of La Rioja and the Rioja R&D&I Council.

In 2009, he left the FER (Federation of Business Organizations of La Rioja) and embarked on a technology-based business development project, becoming the sales manager for GNOSS, a technology company based in La Rioja dedicated to developing Knowledge Graphs in the field of Artificial Intelligence through the construction of a semantic platform. For 10 years, he worked as a sales manager, developing projects for institutions such as the Prado Museum, BBVA, the Ministry of Education, Grupo Santillana, the University of Deusto, and others.

In September 2018, he left GNOSS and ran as a grassroots member in the open primaries of the PSOE in La Rioja to be the party's candidate for Mayor of Logroño. During this period, he completed a master's degree in Secondary Education Teacher Training at the National University of Distance Education (UNED).

== Political career ==
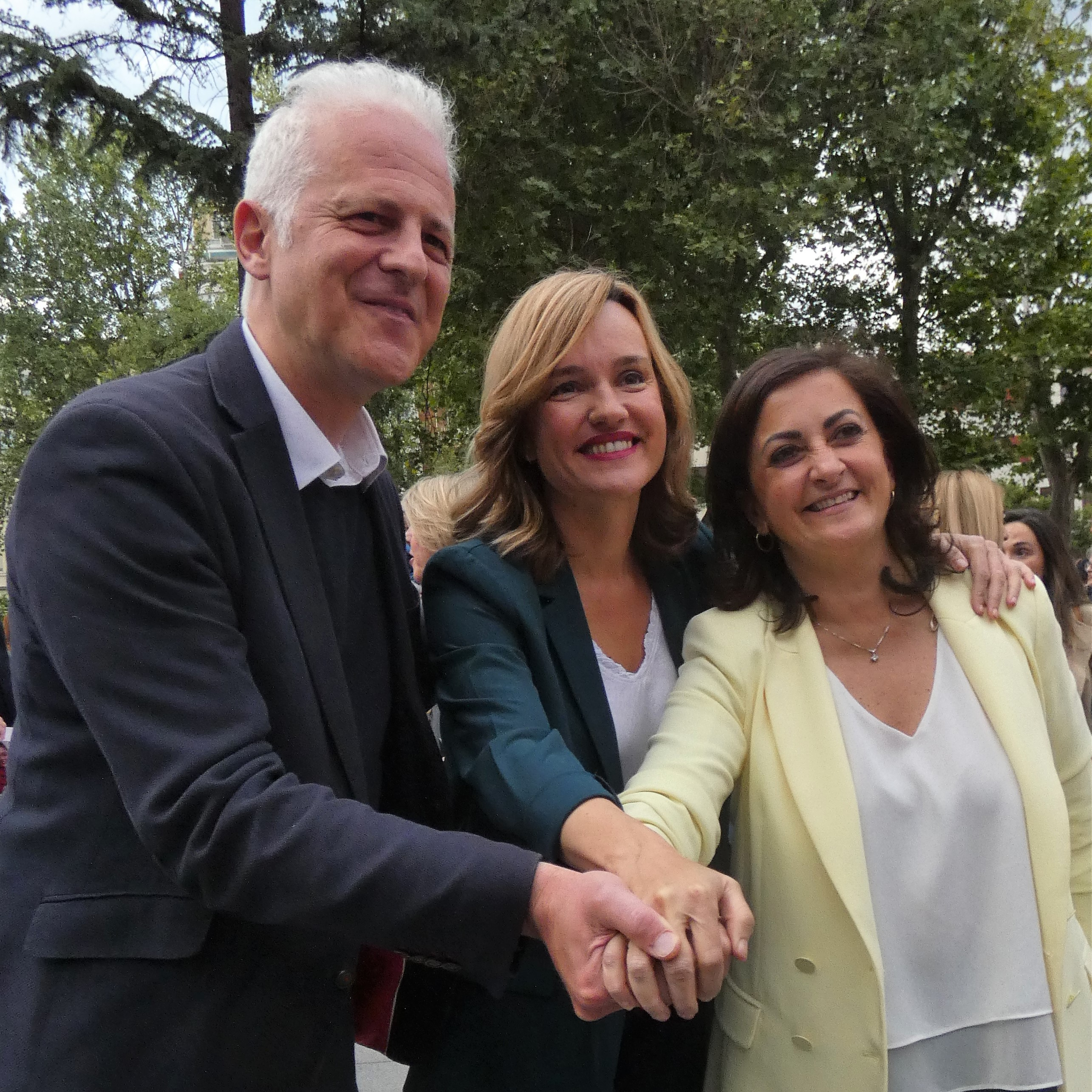
Hermoso de Mendoza with the minister Pilar Alegría and president of La Rioja Concha Andreu, at the end of the 2023 Spanish local elections electoral campaign.

After the death of his grandmother in February 2015, Hermoso de Mendoza joined the Spanish Socialist Workers' Party (PSOE). He was their candidate for mayor of Logroño in the 2019 local elections, having won the primary election. He was sworn in as mayor of Logroño on June 15, 2019, succeeding Cuca Gamarra of the People's Party (PP) and restoring his party to power after eight years. He was supported by the Socialist Group, Unidas Podemos, and the Riojan Party.

Following the results of the 2023 municipal elections, the PP won an absolute majority in the city council, and Hermoso de Mendoza was replaced by Conrado Escobar, who was sworn in as mayor on June 17, 2023. In March 2024, Hermoso de Mendoza resigned from his political and institutional positions.
