= Juan Fernández Navarrete =

Spanish artist (1526–1579)

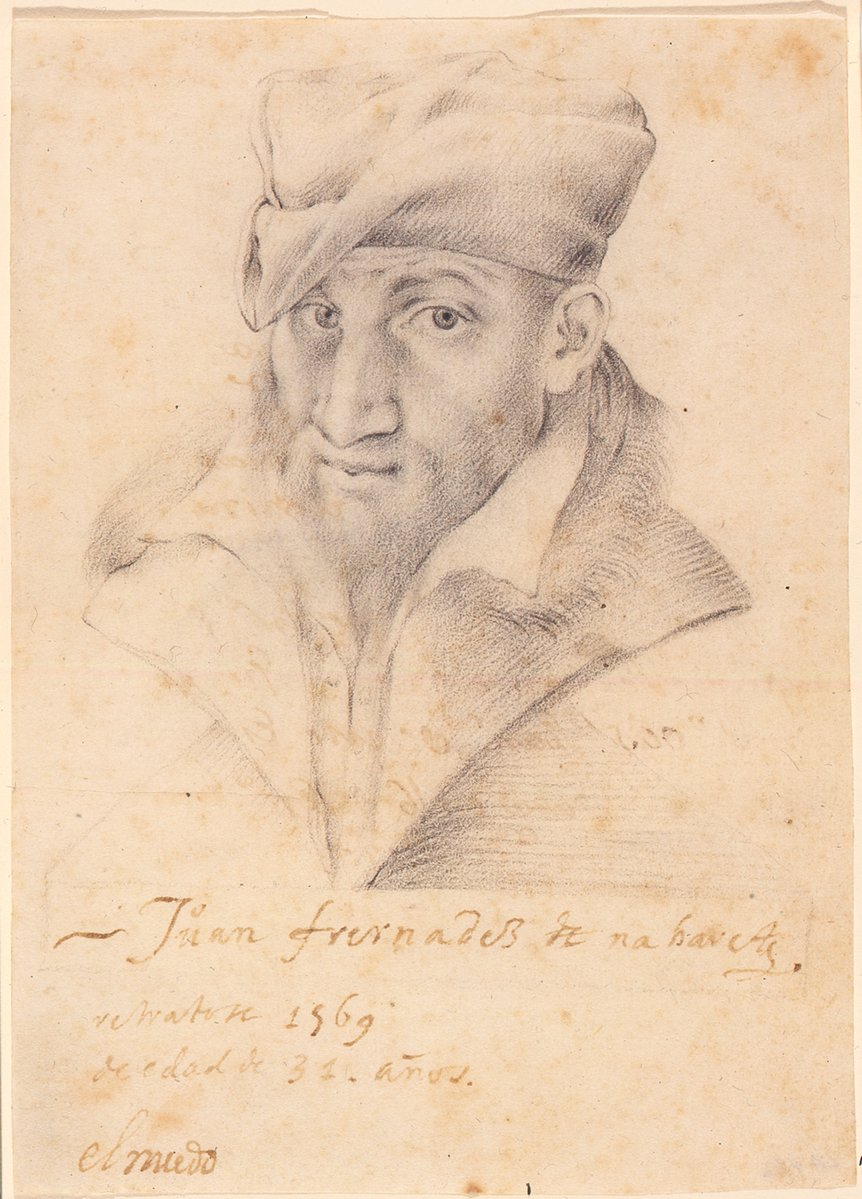
- Juan Fernández de Navarrete
- Born: 1526; Logroño, Spain
- Died: 28 March 1579 (aged 52–53); Toledo, Spain
- Known for: Painting
- Movement: Renaissance

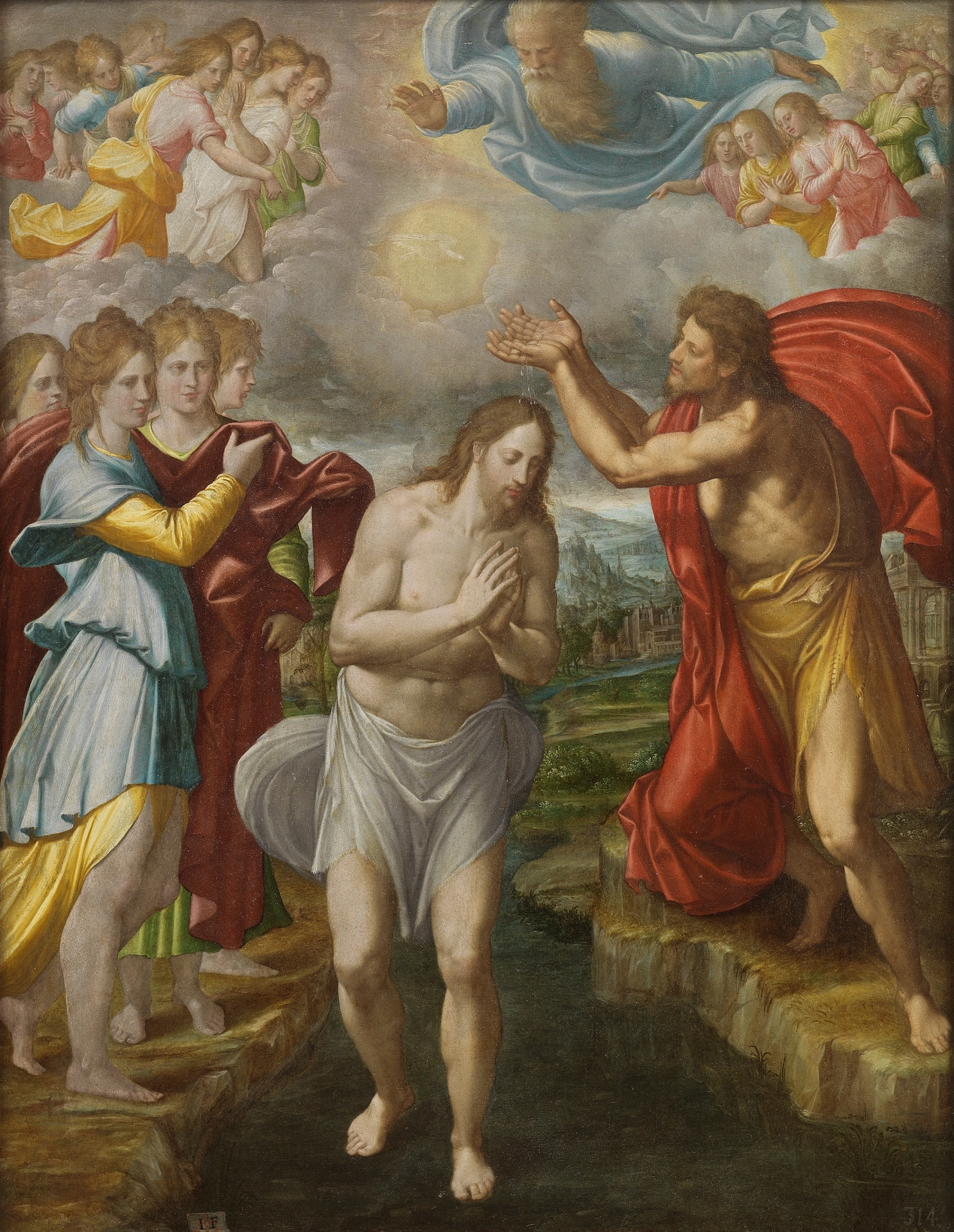
Juan Fernández Navarrete, Baptism of Christ, Museo del Prado, 1567

Juan Fernández Navarrete (1526 – 28 March 1579), or "de Navarrete", called El Mudo (The Mute), was a Spanish Mannerist painter, born at Logroño.

== Biography ==
An illness in infancy deprived Navarrete of his hearing, which affected his ability to learn to speak. At a very early age he began to express his wants by sketching objects with a piece of charcoal. He received his first instructions in art from Fray Vicente de Santo Domingo, a Hieronymite monk at Estella, and also with Gaspar Becerra. He visited Naples, Rome, Florence and Milan. Pellegrino Tibaldi met him in Rome in 1550.

According to most accounts he was for a considerable time the pupil and assistant of Titian at Venice. In 1568 Philip II of Spain summoned him to Madrid with the title of king's painter and a salary, and employed him to execute pictures for the Escorial. During the 1560s and 1570s the huge monastery-palace of El Escorial was still under construction and Philip II was experiencing difficulties in finding good artists for the many large paintings required to decorate it. Titian was very old, and died in 1576, and Tintoretto, Veronese and Anthonis Mor all refused to come to Spain. Philip had to rely on the lesser talent of Navarrete, whose gravedad y decoro ("seriousness and decorum") the king approved. For eleven years until his death Navarrete worked largely on El Escorial.

The most celebrated of the works he produced there are a "Nativity" (in which, as in the well-known work on the same subject by Correggio, the light emanates from the infant Saviour), a "Baptism of Christ" (now Prado), and "Abraham Receiving the Three Angels" (one of his last works, dated 1576, National Gallery of Ireland, Dublin).

He executed many other altar-pieces, all characterized by boldness and freedom in design, and by the rich warm colouring which has acquired for him the surname of "the Spanish Titian." He died at the age of 52 or 53 in Toledo.
