= Conrado Escobar =

Spanish politician (born 1964)

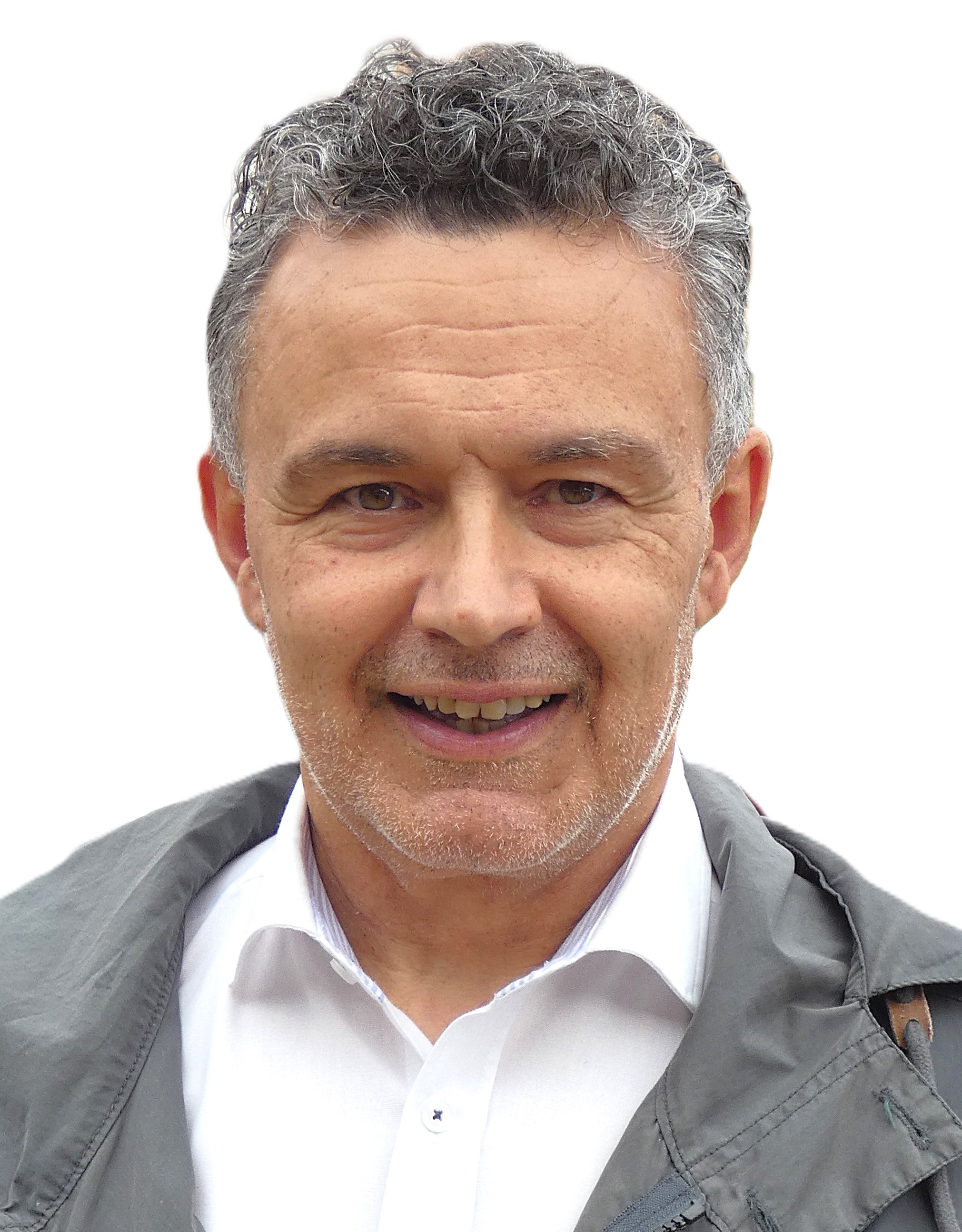

Mayor of Logroño
- Incumbent
- Assumed office 17 June 2023
- Preceded by: Pablo Hermoso de Mendoza
Other offices
Regional Minister of Justice, Social Services, Families and Equality of La Rioja
In office 10 July 2015 – 30 August 2019
President	José Ignacio Ceniceros
Preceded by	Emilio del Río Sanz
Succeeded by	Ana Santos
Regional Minister of Public Administrations and Local Policy of La Rioja
In office 3 July 2007 – 27 June 2011
President	Pedro Sanz
Preceded by	Alberto Bretón
Succeeded by	Concepción Arruga
Secretary General of the People's Party of La Rioja
In office 1999–2004
Preceded by	José Ignacio Ceniceros
Succeeded by	Carlos Cuevas
Spokesperson of the People's Parliamentary Group in the Parliament of La Rioja
In office 23 June 1995 – 14 June 2003
Preceded by	Joaquín Espert
Succeeded by	Carlos Cuevas
Parliamentary and municipal seats
Member of the Congress of Deputies
In office 29 November 2011 – 10 July 2015
Constituency	La Rioja
Senator
In office 5 July 2011 – 26 September 2011
Appointed by	Parliament of La Rioja
Deputy of the Parliament of La Rioja
In office 23 June 1995 – 14 June 2003
Councillor of the Logroño City Council
Incumbent
Assumed office 15 June 2015

Personal details
- Born: 10 June 1964 (age 62) Logroño, La Rioja, Spain
- Party: People's Party (PP)
- Children: 3

Conrado Escobar Las Heras (born 10 June 1964) is a Spanish People's Party (PP) politician, serving as mayor of Logroño in La Rioja since 2023. He has held elected office at municipal and regional level, and served as a minister in the government of La Rioja. He has sat in both houses of the Cortes Generales, namely the Congress of Deputies and the Senate of Spain.

== Early and personal life ==
Born in Logroño in La Rioja, Escobar was educated by the Marists. He graduated with a law degree from the University of Oviedo and also possesses diplomas in territorial organisation, and human resources. He then left his job in Asturias to set up his own law firm in his hometown. As of 2023, Escobar has three children with his wife Eva, who is from Asturias.

== Political career ==
=== Early political career (1991–2011) ===
Escobar served on his hometown's city council from 1991 to 1995, and again from 2003 to 2007. In between, he was the People's Party (PP) spokesperson in the Parliament of La Rioja, as well as being secretary general of the People's Party of La Rioja from 1999 to 2003. He was a senator appointed by the regional parliament from 1999 to 2003, and the regional minister for public administration and local politics between 2007 and 2011.

=== Congress and Senate (2011–2015) ===
In July 2011, Escobar was appointed for a second spell in the senate by the same body as before, succeeding Carlos Cuevas. Months later, he was named as the lead candidate on the PP list for the La Rioja constituency of the Congress of Deputies in the 2011 Spanish general election. His party won in the constituency, taking three of the four seats.

=== Return to regional and local politics (2015–present) ===
Escobar returned to regional government in July 2015, being named minister of social policy, family and justice in the Government of José Ignacio Ceniceros; his congressional seat went to Carmen Duque, leader of the New Generations of the People's Party in La Rioja. In March 2019, he was named the PP candidate for mayor of Logroño, as incumbent Cuca Gamarra was to run for Congress; the party lost the office to Spanish Socialist Workers' Party (PSOE) candidate Pablo Hermoso de Mendoza.

In December 2022, Escobar was confirmed as the PP candidate for Logroño a second time in the 2023 Spanish local elections. His party took 14 of 27 seats, an absolute majority that confirmed him as the mayor.
