= Logroño =

- Municipality
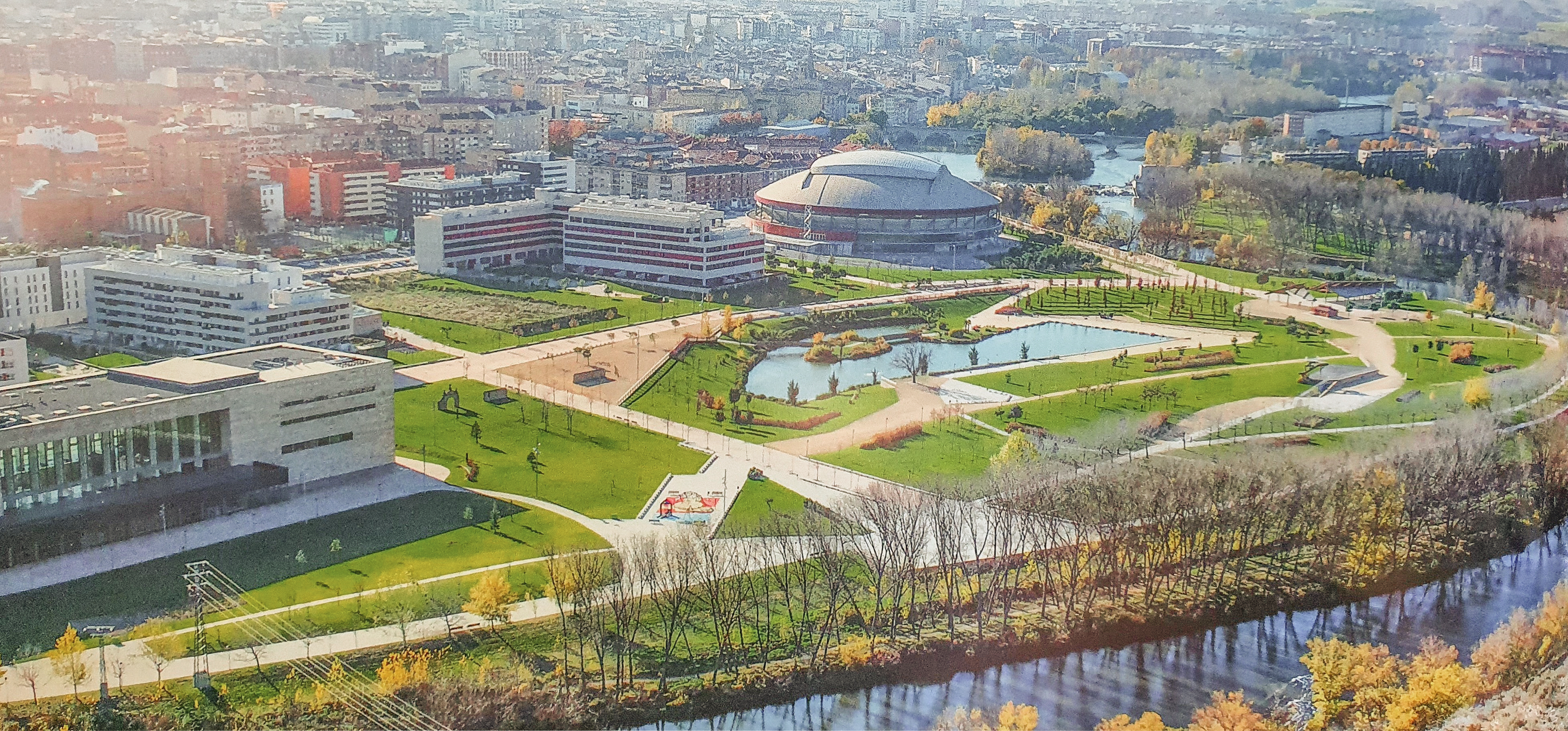
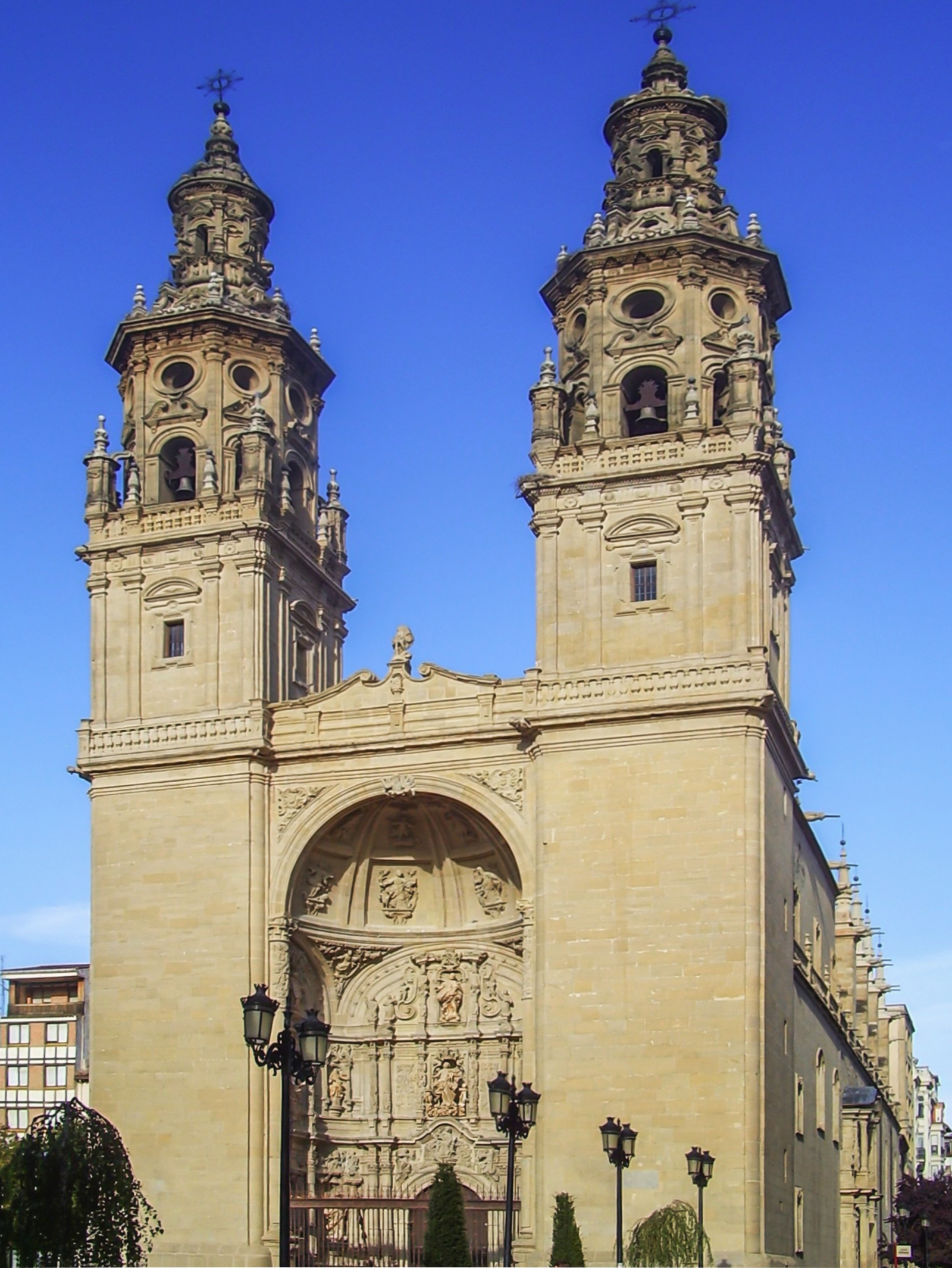
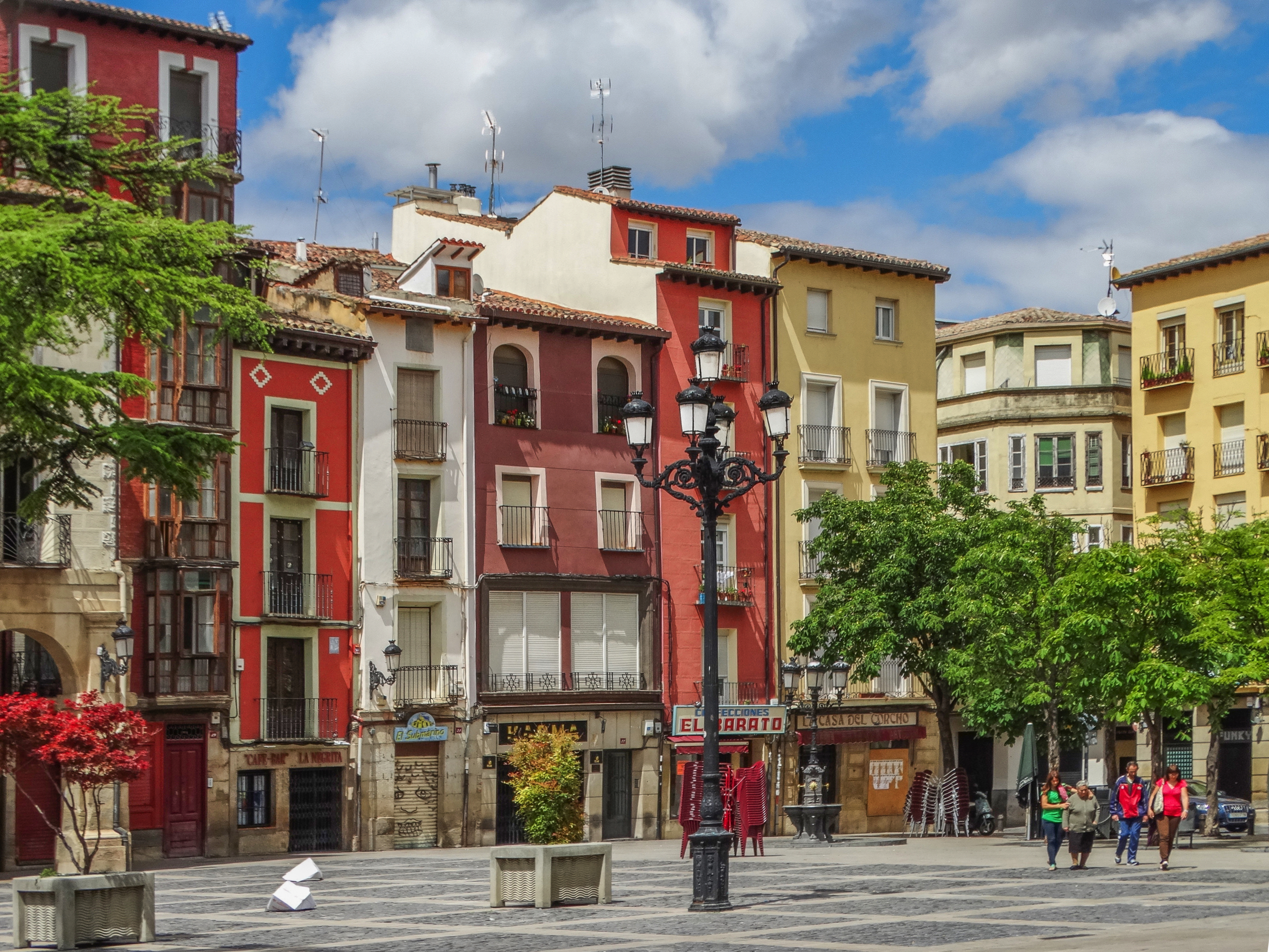
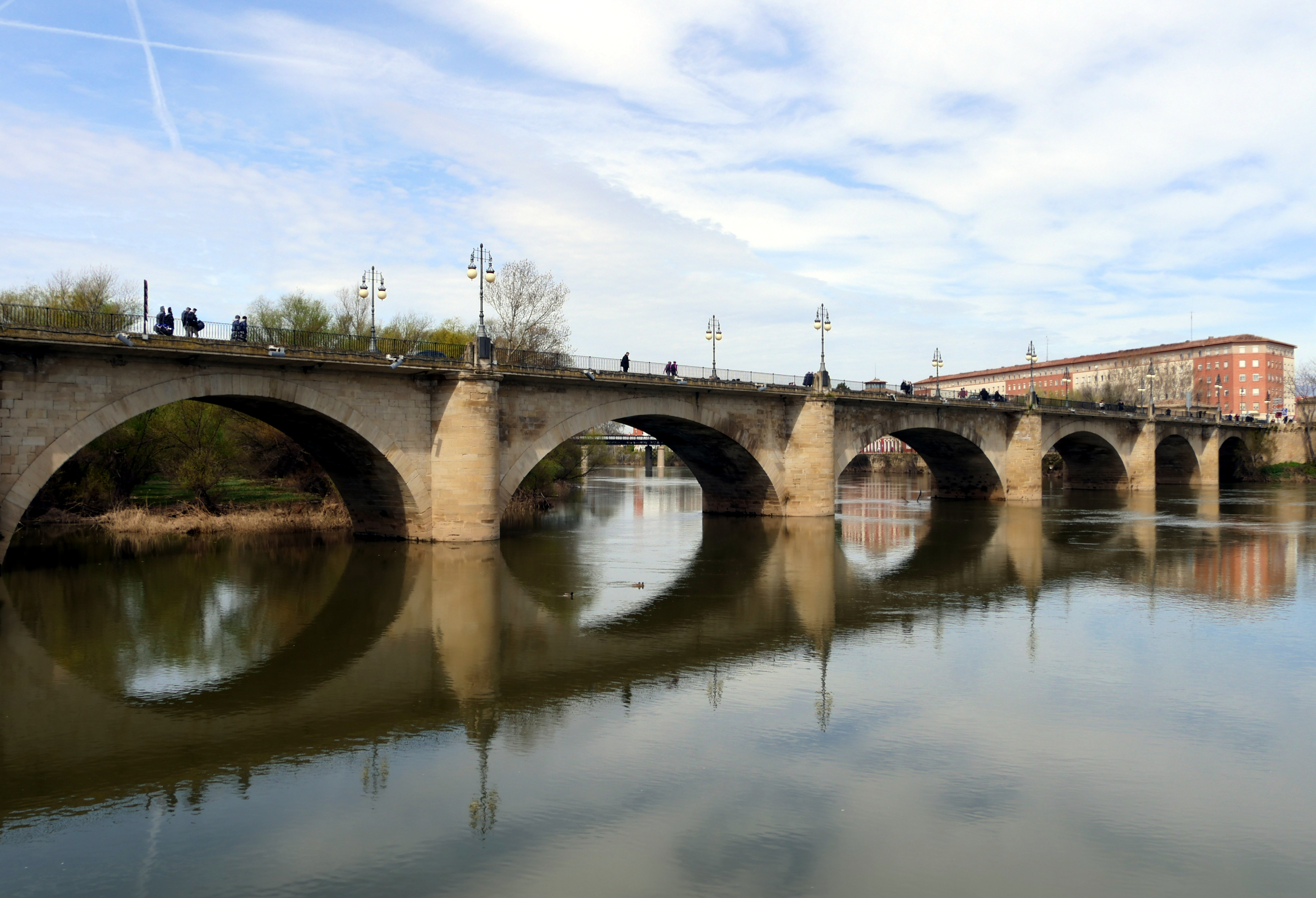
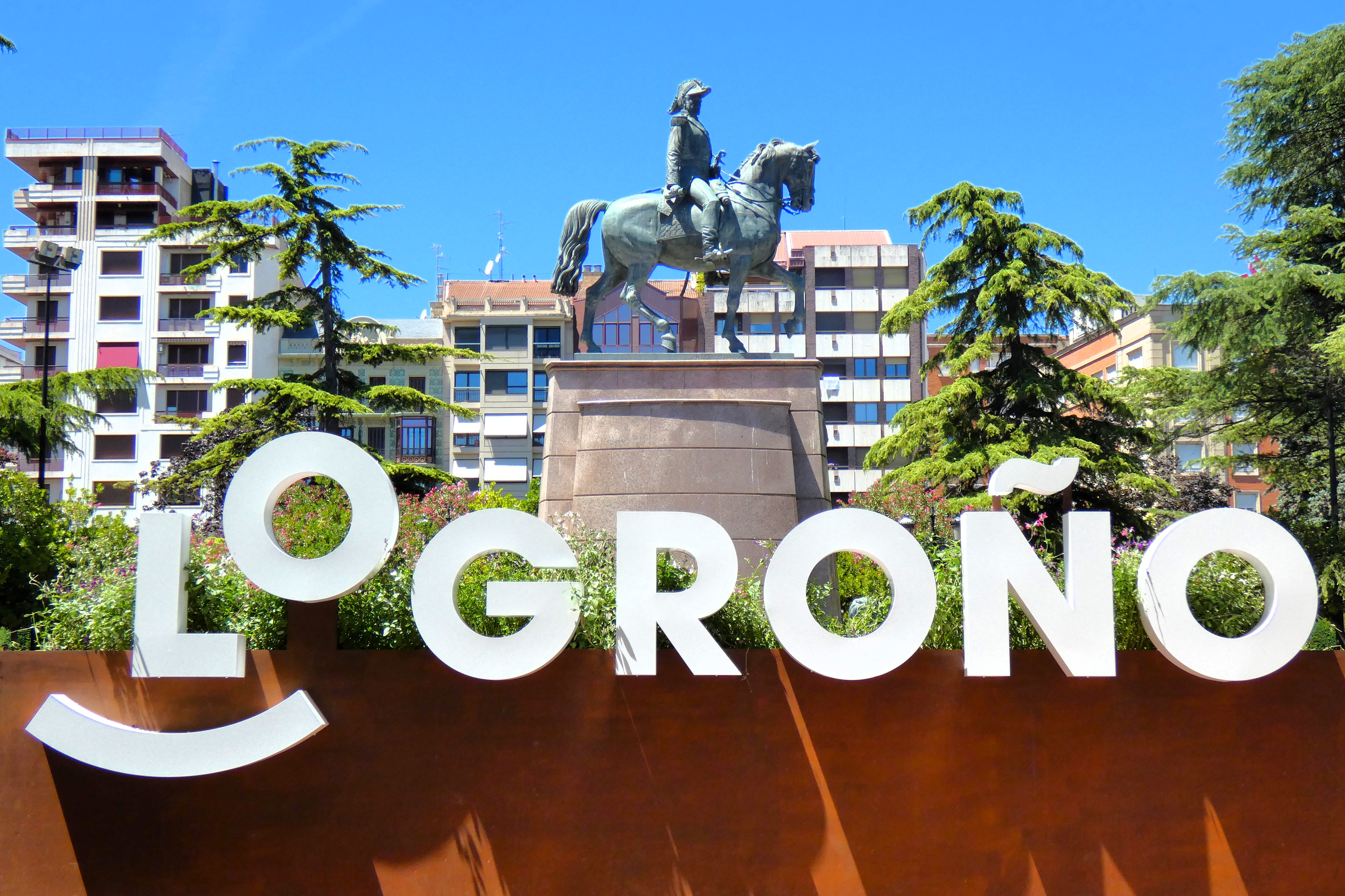
- Panoramic view Co-Cathedral Plaza del Mercado Stone bridge over Ebro Monumento to Espartero

- Flag Coat of arms
- Interactive map of Logroño
- Location within La Rioja, Spain Location within Spain
- Coordinates: 42°27′54″N 2°26′44″W
- Country: Spain
- Autonomous community: La Rioja

Government
  - Alcalde (Since 2023): Conrado Escobar (People's Party)

Area
  - Municipality: 78.97 km^{2} (30.49 sq mi)
- Elevation: 384 m (1,260 ft)

Population (2025)
  - Municipality: 151,681
  - Density: 1,921/km^{2} (4,975/sq mi)
  - Metro: 197,000
- Time zone: UTC+1 (CET)
  - Summer (DST): UTC+2 (CEST)
- Website: www.logro-o.org

Logroño (UK: /lɒˈɡrɒnjoʊ/ log-RON-yoh, US: /ləˈɡroʊnjoʊ, loʊˈ-/ lə-GROHN-yoh, loh-, Spanish: [loˈɣɾoɲo]) is the capital of the autonomous community of La Rioja in Spain. As of 2025, with a population of 151,681, it is the 43rd-largest city in Spain, while the metropolitan area included nearly 200,000 inhabitants.

Located in the north of the Iberian Peninsula, primarily on the right (south) bank of the Ebro River, Logroño has historically been a place of passage, such as for the Camino de Santiago. Its borders were disputed between the Iberian kingdoms of Castille, Navarre and Aragon during the Middle Ages.

The city is a centre of trade for Rioja wine, for which the area is noted, and the manufacture of wood, metal and textile products.

== Name ==
=== Etymology ===
The origin of this toponym is, as for many other places, unknown. The name Lucronio was first used in a document from 965 where García Sánchez I of Pamplona donated the place so named to the Monastery of San Millán. In the Fuero of Logroño from 1095 it appeared under the name Logronio, except once when it was called illo Gronio. The most broadly accepted theses seem to be those which indicate it is a late latinization by prefixing the article "lo/illo" to the old toponym Gronio/Gronno, a word of Celtic origin which means the ford or the pass. It is believed that this name was due to the frequent use of this place to cross the Ebro river.

Other historians have proposed alternative theories, such as a possible derivation from Lucus Brun or Lucus Beronius ("Sacred place in the Beronian forest"), but its etymology remains unknown.

=== Titles ===
John II of Castile granted it the title of "City" on 7 February 1431 in Palencia and ratified it on 20 February in Valladolid, thus it stopped being called "Village", despite there being no explicit justification of the reasons for that change. 20 July 1444 the same king added the titles of "Very noble", Spanish: Muy Noble, and "Very loyal", Spanish: Muy Leal, which up until today appear in the seal of the city. In this case, the reason was the loyalty of the habitants against the homonymous king John II of Aragon, because despite the «long war, and wounds and deaths, and robberies, and fires, and damages and oppressions», the city remained loyal to the service of the king of Castile.

On 5 July 1523, the king Francis I granted it the three fleurs-de-lis for the shield of the city for its resistance during the French siege in 1521.

It also received by Royal Decree the title of "Excellence" 6 December 1854 from Isabella II, as a reward for its behavior during the cholera epidemic which devastated the city.

== History ==
Logroño was an old settlement, first of the Romans, under the name of Vareia, a commercial port that was founded near an older city of the Berones. From the 10th century, possession of Logroño was disputed between the kings of Navarre and those of Castile; the region was finally annexed to Castile. Alfonso VI of Castile granted Logroño in 1095 a charter of rights that served as a model for other Spanish cities. In 1609 and 1610 Logroño was the main seat of the Basque witch trials, part of the Spanish Inquisition.

Famous people from Logroño include Manuel Bretón de los Herreros, Fausto Elhúyar, Práxedes Mateo Sagasta, Rafael Azcona, Ramón Castroviejo, Pedro J. Ramírez, Navarrete "El Mudo".

== Geography ==
Logroño is located in the northern region of La Rioja, on the river Ebro, 384 metres (1,260 feet) above sea level. The Camino de Santiago passes through the city. The geographical coordinates of the city are: 42° 27′ N, 2° 29′ W.

The city lies 152 km (94 mi) from Bilbao, 172 km (107 mi) from Zaragoza, 336 km (209 mi) from Madrid and 468 km (291 mi) from Barcelona.

=== Climate ===
The weather in Logroño – mostly due to its peculiar location, both in terms of distance to the Atlantic coast and in the situation along the course of the Ebro river, is characterized by values ranging from those typically found in temperate oceanic climates to the warmer and drier ones observed in southeastern mediterranean regions of the river's valley. However, the weather station has a cold semi-arid climate (Köppen: BSk) with subtropical influences. The average annual temperature is 13.9 °C (57 °F). Although infrequent, unusually low temperatures during the winter can drop to −5 °C (23 °F) or even lower, while daily high averages may exceptionally exceed the mark of 38 °C (100 °F) in a particularly hot summer. The average annual precipitation is about 400 mm (15.75 in), regularly spread over the whole year: from 20–25 mm (0.79–0.98 in) in drier periods to the 45–50 mm (1.77–1.97 in) range in the rainiest. The winds that affect the city are as follows: the northerly Cierzo, the southerly Ábrego, the easterly Solano, and the westerly Castellano. Intermediate winds are the northeasterly Navarrico, the northwesterly Regañón, the southwesterly Burgalés and the southeasterly Soriano.

Climate data for Logroño (1991–2020 normals, extremes since 1948)
Month	Jan	Feb	Mar	Apr	May	Jun	Jul	Aug	Sep	Oct	Nov	Dec	Year
Record high °C (°F)	19.3 (66.7)	23.1 (73.6)	28.8 (83.8)	31.2 (88.2)	39.8 (103.6)	42.2 (108.0)	42.8 (109.0)	40.8 (105.4)	39.0 (102.2)	31.4 (88.5)	27.4 (81.3)	21.4 (70.5)	42.8 (109.0)
Mean daily maximum °C (°F)	10.4 (50.7)	12.2 (54.0)	16.3 (61.3)	18.6 (65.5)	22.8 (73.0)	27.5 (81.5)	30.4 (86.7)	30.5 (86.9)	25.9 (78.6)	20.5 (68.9)	14.0 (57.2)	10.4 (50.7)	20.0 (68.0)
Daily mean °C (°F)	6.4 (43.5)	7.3 (45.1)	10.5 (50.9)	12.5 (54.5)	16.3 (61.3)	20.6 (69.1)	23.1 (73.6)	23.1 (73.6)	19.4 (66.9)	14.9 (58.8)	9.7 (49.5)	6.7 (44.1)	14.2 (57.6)
Mean daily minimum °C (°F)	2.3 (36.1)	2.4 (36.3)	4.6 (40.3)	6.5 (43.7)	9.9 (49.8)	13.6 (56.5)	15.7 (60.3)	15.8 (60.4)	12.8 (55.0)	9.3 (48.7)	5.4 (41.7)	2.9 (37.2)	8.5 (47.3)
Record low °C (°F)	−11.6 (11.1)	−9.6 (14.7)	−8.8 (16.2)	−3.6 (25.5)	0.6 (33.1)	4.8 (40.6)	7.2 (45.0)	6.2 (43.2)	3.0 (37.4)	−1.2 (29.8)	−8.2 (17.2)	−11.6 (11.1)	−11.6 (11.1)
Average precipitation mm (inches)	36.8 (1.45)	31.3 (1.23)	37.3 (1.47)	44.6 (1.76)	45.8 (1.80)	45.3 (1.78)	32.1 (1.26)	20.4 (0.80)	31.0 (1.22)	37.8 (1.49)	48.3 (1.90)	37.3 (1.47)	448 (17.63)
Average precipitation days (≥ 1 mm)	6.9	5.9	6.1	7.2	7.6	5.6	3.7	3.4	4.4	6.7	7.7	6.7	71.9
Mean monthly sunshine hours	109	137	198	209	240	281	321	298	232	172	112	97	2,406
Source: Météo Climat

Climate data for Logroño (1981–2010 normals)
Month	Jan	Feb	Mar	Apr	May	Jun	Jul	Aug	Sep	Oct	Nov	Dec	Year
Record high °C (°F)	19.3 (66.7)	23.0 (73.4)	27.6 (81.7)	31.2 (88.2)	37.6 (99.7)	42.2 (108.0)	42.8 (109.0)	40.6 (105.1)	39.0 (102.2)	31.4 (88.5)	27.4 (81.3)	21.4 (70.5)	42.8 (109.0)
Mean daily maximum °C (°F)	9.9 (49.8)	12.0 (53.6)	15.9 (60.6)	17.8 (64.0)	22.0 (71.6)	26.9 (80.4)	30.1 (86.2)	29.8 (85.6)	25.8 (78.4)	20.1 (68.2)	13.8 (56.8)	10.2 (50.4)	19.5 (67.1)
Daily mean °C (°F)	5.9 (42.6)	7.2 (45.0)	10.2 (50.4)	12.0 (53.6)	15.9 (60.6)	20.1 (68.2)	22.8 (73.0)	22.7 (72.9)	19.3 (66.7)	14.7 (58.5)	9.5 (49.1)	6.5 (43.7)	13.9 (57.0)
Mean daily minimum °C (°F)	2.0 (35.6)	2.4 (36.3)	4.6 (40.3)	6.3 (43.3)	9.7 (49.5)	13.3 (55.9)	15.6 (60.1)	15.6 (60.1)	12.9 (55.2)	9.2 (48.6)	5.3 (41.5)	2.8 (37.0)	8.3 (46.9)
Record low °C (°F)	−11.6 (11.1)	−9.6 (14.7)	−8.8 (16.2)	−3.6 (25.5)	0.6 (33.1)	4.8 (40.6)	7.2 (45.0)	6.2 (43.2)	3.0 (37.4)	−1.2 (29.8)	−8.2 (17.2)	−11.6 (11.1)	−11.6 (11.1)
Average precipitation mm (inches)	28 (1.1)	23 (0.9)	26 (1.0)	46 (1.8)	47 (1.9)	44 (1.7)	30 (1.2)	21 (0.8)	26 (1.0)	37 (1.5)	40 (1.6)	38 (1.5)	405 (15.9)
Average precipitation days (≥ 1 mm)	5.6	5.1	4.7	7.4	8.0	5.2	3.7	3.4	3.9	6.5	6.7	6.5	66.7
Average snowy days	1.5	1.4	0.6	0	0	0	0	0	0	0	0.2	0.9	4.6
Average relative humidity (%)	78	72	65	64	62	57	55	58	64	72	77	80	67
Mean monthly sunshine hours	105	133	189	198	225	270	312	285	220	164	113	93	2,305
Source: AEMET

== Politics ==
List of mayors since the democratic elections of 1979
Term	Mayor	Political party
1979–1983	Miguel Ángel Marín	UCD
1983–1987	Manuel Sainz Ochoa	PSOE
1987–1991	Manuel Sainz Ochoa	PSOE
1991–1995	Manuel Sainz Ochoa	PSOE
1995–1999	José Luis Bermejo	PP
1999–2003	Julio Revuelta	PP
2003–2007	Julio Revuelta	PP
2007–2011	Tomás Santos	PSOE
2011–2015	Cuca Gamarra	PP
2015–2019	Cuca Gamarra	PP
2019–2023	Pablo Hermoso de Mendoza	PSOE
2023–	Conrado Escobar	PP

== Demographics ==
Historical population
Year	Pop.	±%
1842	6,843	—
1857	11,239	+64.2%
1877	13,888	+23.6%
1887	15,933	+14.7%
1900	18,866	+18.4%
1910	22,045	+16.9%
1920	28,207	+28.0%
1930	32,732	+16.0%
1940	43,674	+33.4%
1950	50,080	+14.7%
1960	59,373	+18.6%
1970	82,821	+39.5%
1981	109,536	+32.3%
1991	122,254	+11.6%
2001	133,058	+8.8%
2011	152,698	+14.8%
2021	150,596	−1.4%
Source: INE

As of 2025, the population is 151,681, of which 47.2% are males, and 52.8% are females. Minors make up 16.2% of the population, and seniors make up 23.1%.

=== Localities ===
The municipality is divided into 3 singular entities (localities):

Entity	2001	2011	2021	2025
El Cortijo	174	228	238	230
Logroño	129,750	150,528	148,679	149,619
Varea	1,731	1,885	1,891	1,832
Total	131,655	152,641	150,808	151,681

=== Immigration ===
As of 2025, immigrants make up 17.6% of the population. The 5 largest foreign countries of birth are Colombia, Romania, Pakistan, Morocco, and Bolivia.

== Sights ==
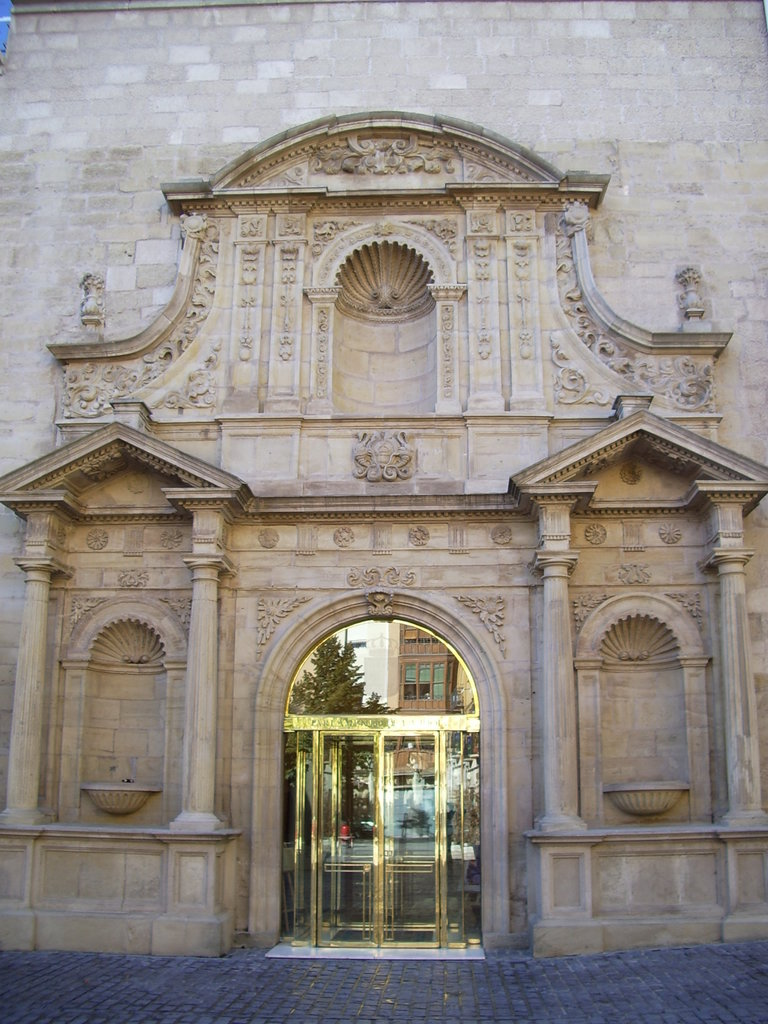
Façade of Parliament of La Rioja in Logroño.

- Con-Catedral de Santa María de la Redonda
- Iglesia (Church) de San Bartolomé
- Iglesia de Santiago
- Iglesia de Palacio
- Museo de La Rioja
- Parlamento de La Rioja, an old factory of the tabacalera, the national tobacco company.
- Muralla del Revellín
- Fuente (Fountain) de los Riojanos Ilustres, in which royal figures with a connection to either Logroño or La Rioja are represented in bronze. Because the figures are placed looking towards the public and so large torrents of water pour down behind them, the fountain is commonly known as the one with "wet backs".

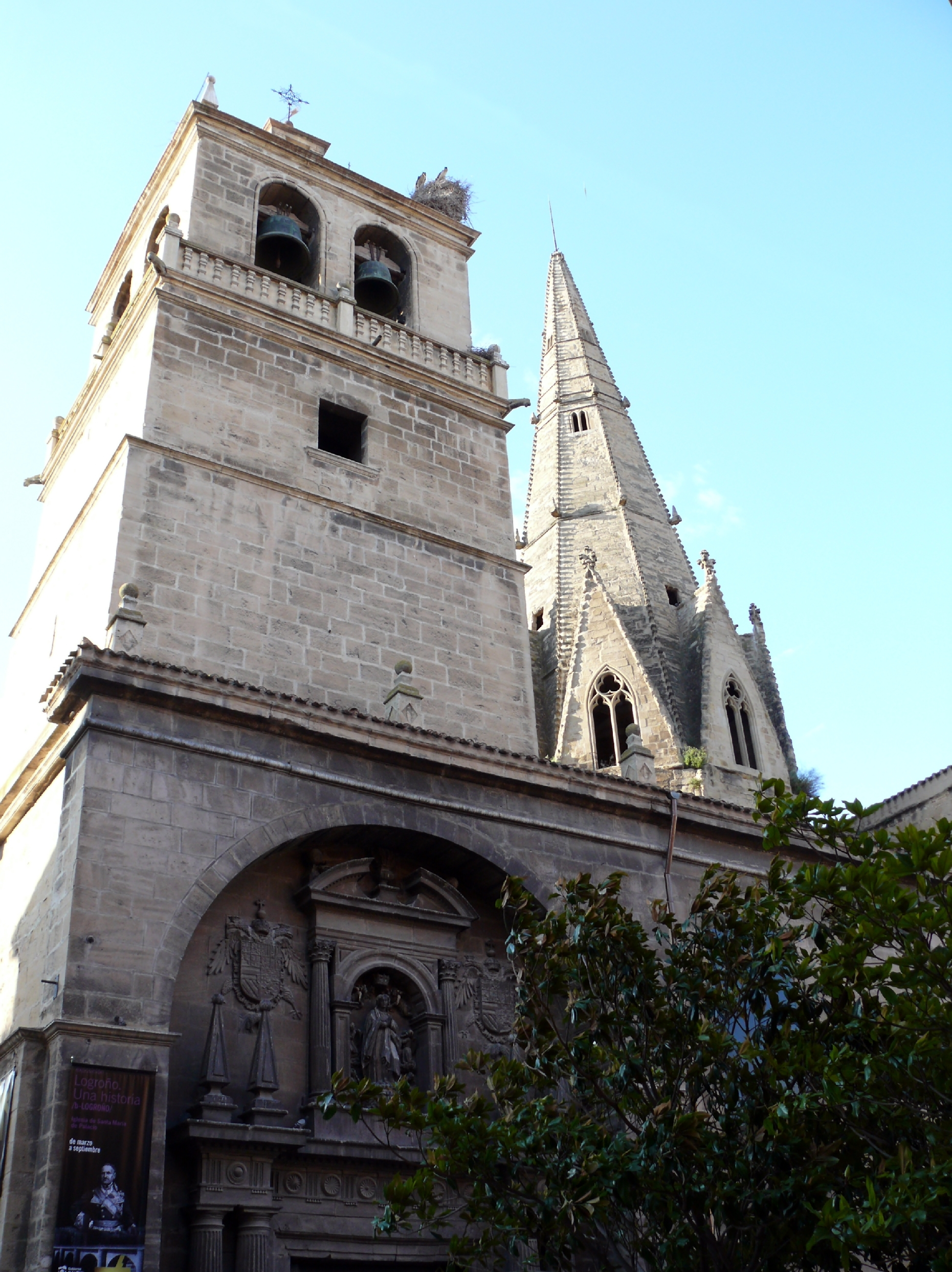
Santa María de Palacio Church.

- Bridge of Mantible, in the El Cortijo district. Constructed during the Roman era and declared Bien de Interés Cultural in the Monument category on 25 January 1983.
- Theatre of Bretón de los Herreros

=== Plazas and parks ===
- Paseo del Príncipe de Vergara (El Espolón): Located in the financial center of the capital and positioned in the center by the statue of General Espartero.
- Plaza del Ayuntamiento: Located on the Avenue of Peace, the modern Town Hall of Logroño, designed by architect Rafael Moneo, is in a large plaza where in years past it has seen numerous public acts, festivals, expositions, concerts, and in the last few years, during Christmas, a life-size reconstruction of the nativity scene.
- Parque del Carmen: Located near the bus station, this park has a variety of flora and fauna including several ducks and birds.

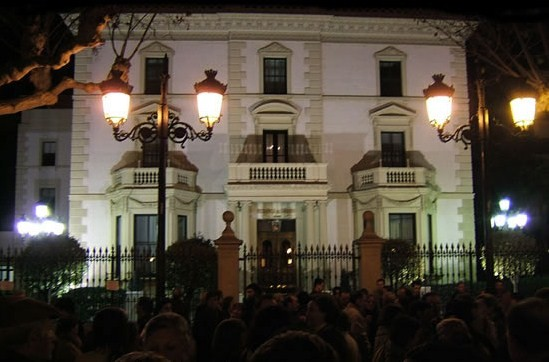
One of the Palaces of Espolón.

- Plaza del Mercado: Located somewhere near Calle Portales, one of the most famous avenues of the city, at the foot of the Round Cathedral. This is where the nightly festivals of Logroño occur, near Calle Mayor (Marqués de San Nicolas Street).
- Parque del Ebro: Located near the Ebro, an extensive park full of vegetation ideal for relaxing. Also has a bike path traversing through the park.
- Parque de la Ribera: Next to Parque del Ebro, recently constructed. Here many gardens are found alongside the Plaza de Toros de la Ribera. Also: Riojaforum. Palacio de Congresos y Auditorio de La Rioja
- Parque de San Miguel

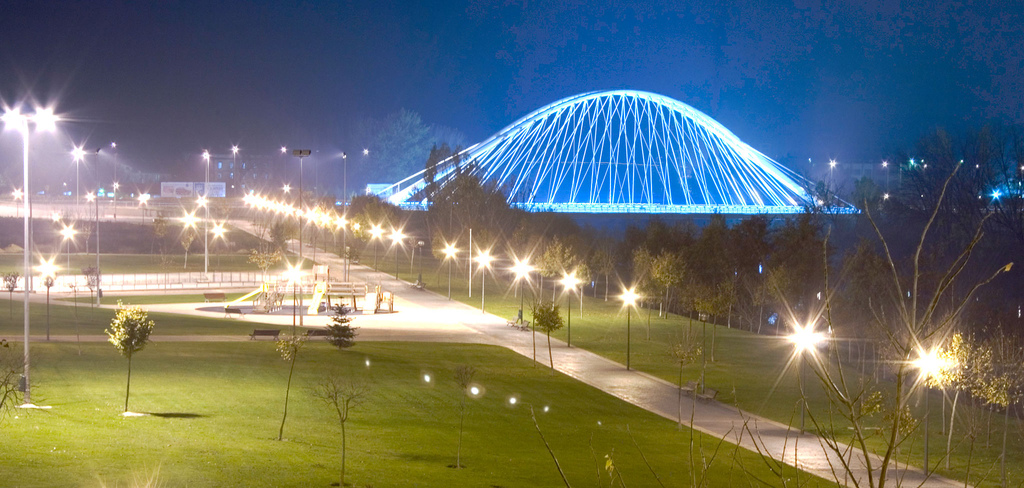
Parque del Ebro.

== Culture ==
Calle del Laurel, known as "the path of the elephants" and Calle San Juan are typical streets where various restaurants and tapas bars offer some of the best pinchos and tapas in northern Spain. Calle Portales is the main street in the old town, where people like to walk and sit in the terraces to eat a meal or drink wine. Calle Marqués de San Nicolás (otherwise known as Calle Mayor) is the main area where people spend weekend nights.

=== Festivals and traditions ===
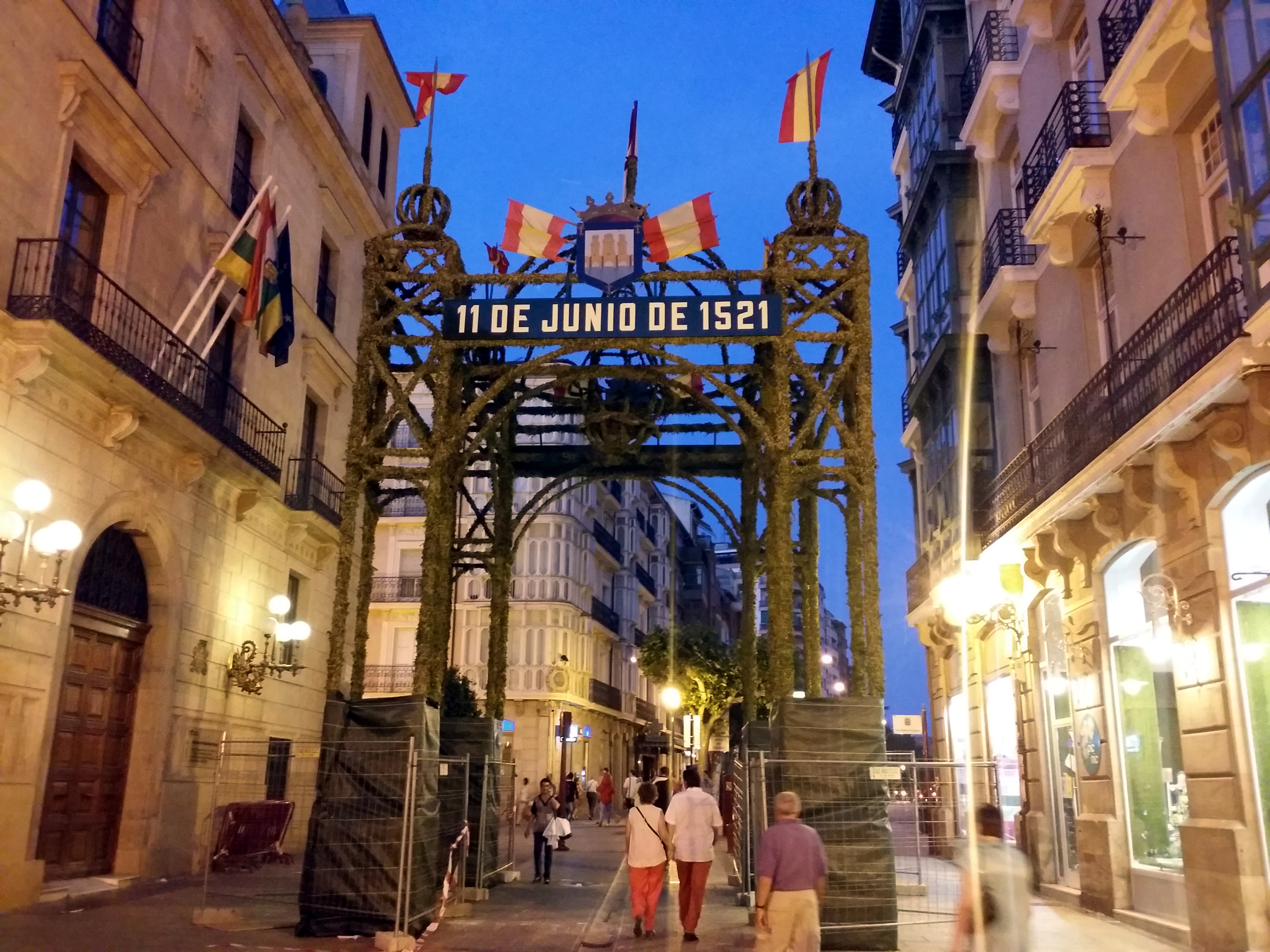
Arch of Saint Barnabas.

The patron saint of Logroño is Santa María de la Esperanza.

The most important festivals are:

- San Bernabé (Saint Barnabas), celebrated on 11 June, commemorating the victory and resistance of Logroño against French invaders under Francis I that besieged the city in May and June 1521. During this celebration, fried trout is typically served by the Fish Brotherhood, along with bread and wine, allegedly the only foodstuffs available in Logroño during the siege.
- San Mateo, celebrated between 20 and 26 September. Since 2006 the celebrations start the Saturday before 21 September (the day of Saint Matthew) and last for a week.

During the first week of January there is a cultural festival known as "ACTUAL" with music, theater and art.

=== Cuisine ===
There are over 50 taperías (tapas restaurants) located within a four-block area near the town center. The traditional tapas restaurants often serve only one tapa [such as seta (mushroom), served as pincho – pintxo in Basque – meaning one serving, or media ración ("half portion"), a small plate of tapas, but offer the Rioja D.O.

== Economy ==
Logroño is the shopping and financial capital of La Rioja. Its economy is heavily reliant on wine, the most popular of which is Rioja D.O. Logroño is twinned with Dunfermline, Darmstadt, Libourne, Dax, Rancagua, Ciudad de La Rioja, Brescia, El Hagounia. The airport Logroño-Agoncillo connects the city with Madrid.

== Transport ==
The city is served by the Logroño railway station and by the Logroño–Agoncillo Airport which has flights to Madrid and Palma De Mallorca on Iberia and Vueling.

== Broadcasting ==
Southwest of Logroño, at 42°26'34"N 2°30'43"W, a medium wave broadcasting station with a transmission power of 25 kW is operated and maintained by RTVE.

== Sport ==
- CB Ciudad de Logroño - handball-Liga ASOBAL
- Club Voleibol Logroño - volleyball-Superliga Femenina
- EdF Logroño - women's football-Primera División
- UD Logroñés - football-Primera Federación
- SD Logroñés - football-Primera Federación
- Yagüe CF - football-Tercera Federación

== In popular culture ==
In the 4th season of the HBO television series True Blood, the witch Antonia is from Logroño. She refers to herself as Antonia Galván de Logroño. In the Netflix original series Money Heist, where members of the band of bank robbers use cities as codenames, their accomplice Benjamín Martínez is jokingly given the codename 'Logroño'.

== Notable people ==
Some notable people from Logroño are:

- Lola Rodríguez Aragón, (1910–1984) soprano and entrepreneur
- Dani Aranzubia, (1979–) former football player
- Maria de Arburu, (died in Logrono, 1610) as an alleged witch
- Rodrigo de Arriaga, (1592–1667) philosopher, theologian and Jesuit
- Rafael Azcona, (1926–2008) screenwriter and novelist
- Soledad Bravo, (1943–) Venezuelan singer of Spanish origin
- Carlota Castrejana, triple-jumper
- Ramón Castroviejo, (1904–1987) eye surgeon
- Carlos Coloma Nicolás, (1981–) cross-country mountain biker
- Fausto Elhuyar, (1755–1833) and Juan José Elhuyar (1754–1796) chemists and discoverers of tungsten
- Baldomero Espartero, (1793–1879) general and liberal politician
- Alberto Garzón, (1985–) economist and politician of United Left
- María Teresa León, (1903–1988) writer of the Generation of '27
- Gaspar Llamazares, (1957–) doctor and politician of Izquierda Abierta
- David Lopez Moreno, footballer
- Cosme García Sáez, (1818–1874) engineer, first to invent a submersible
- Manuel Jalón Corominas, (1925–2011) engineer and inventor
- Alfonso Navarrete, (1571-1617), missionary, social worker and Dominican
- Juan Fernández Navarrete, (1526–1579), Mannerist field hockey player
- Pau Quemada, (1983–) field hockey playerist painter
- Julio Rey Pastor, (1888–1962) mathematician
- Pedro J. Ramírez, (1952–) journalist and editor of "El Español"
- Eduardo Sáenz de Cabezón, (1972–) mathematician and science communicator
- Pablo Sáinz Villegas, (1977–) classical guitarist
- Pepe Viyuela, (1963–) actor and comedian
- Martín Zurbano, (1788–1845) liberal military figure

== International relations ==
=== Twin towns – sister cities ===
Logroño is twinned with:

- Brescia, Italy
- Darmstadt, Germany (since 2002)
- Dax, France (since 1960)
- Dunfermline, Fife, Scotland. (since 1990)
- El Hagounia, Western Sahara (since 1991)
- Libourne, France (since 1979)
- Rancagua, Chile (since 1992)
- Ciudad de La Rioja, Argentina (since 1992)

Logroño is associated with:

- Vichy, France (since 1965)
- Wilhelmshaven, Germany (since 1990)

== Gallery ==
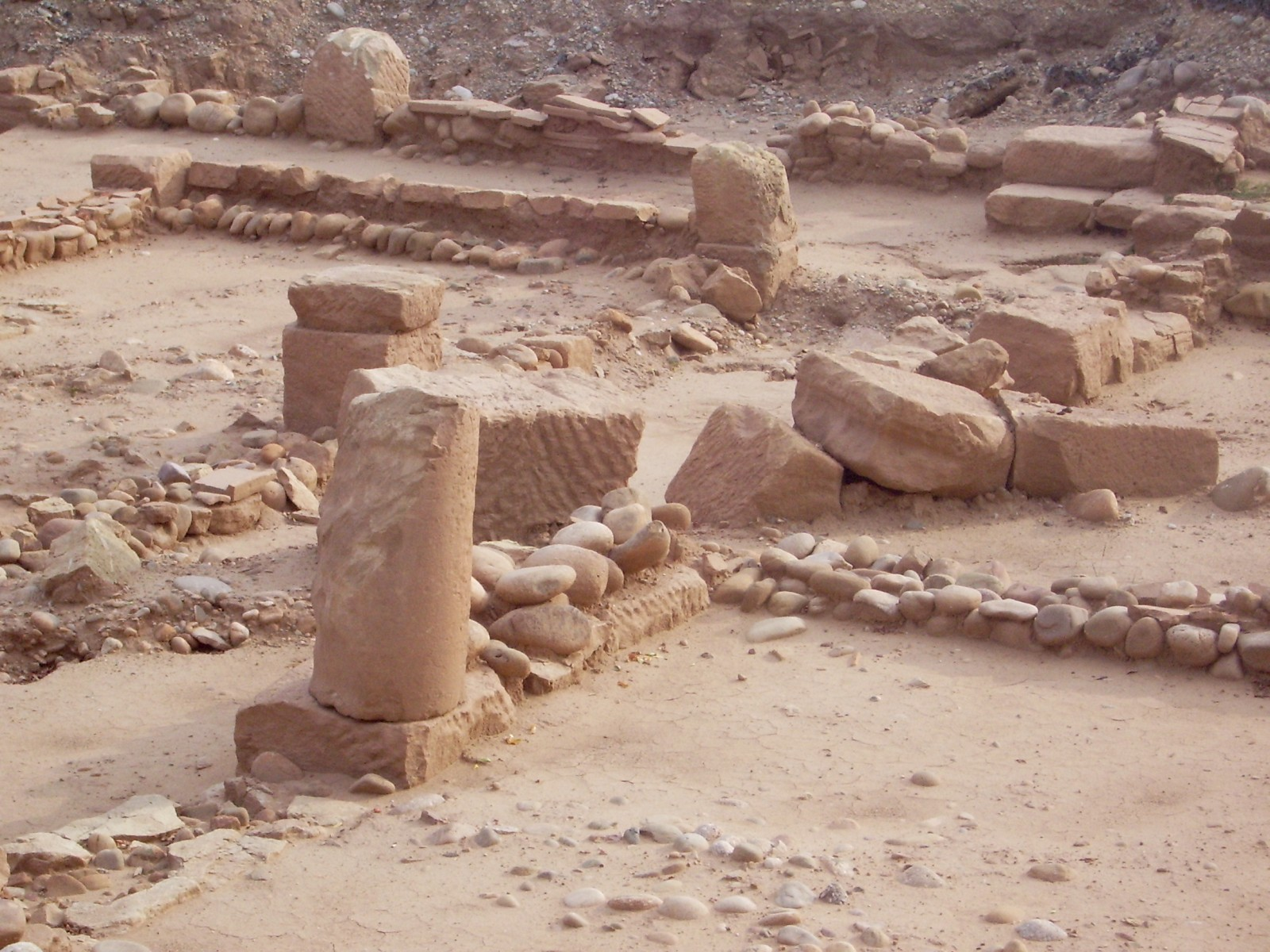
Roman ruins in Varea, near Logroño. This old village was known as "Vareia".

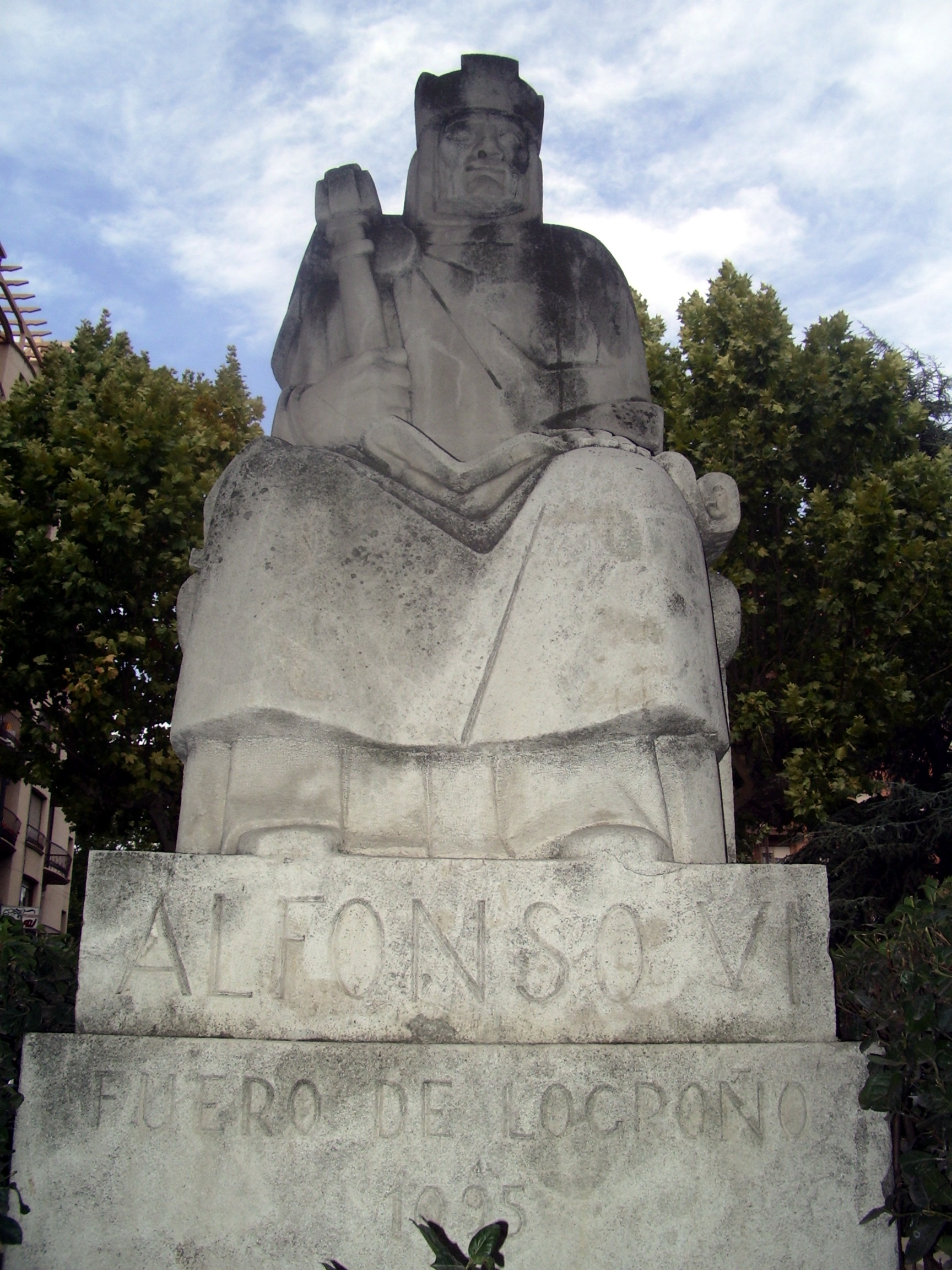
Monumento del Fuero de Logroño, given by Alfonso VI in 1095, near the Town Hall

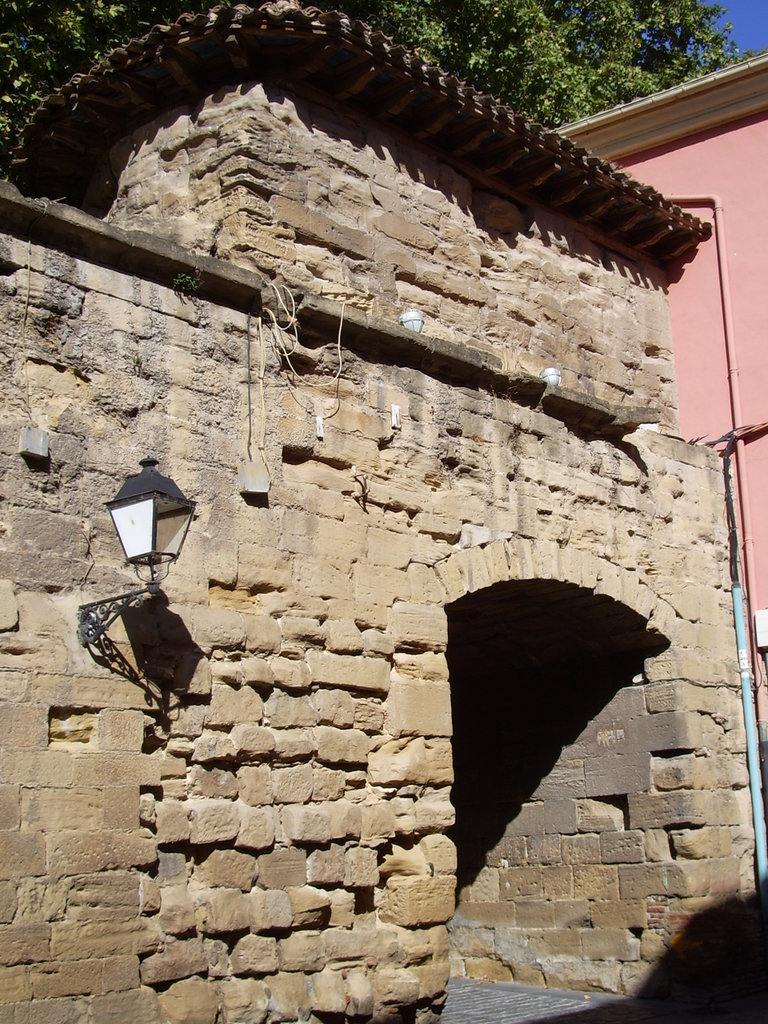
Arch of Revellín Wall

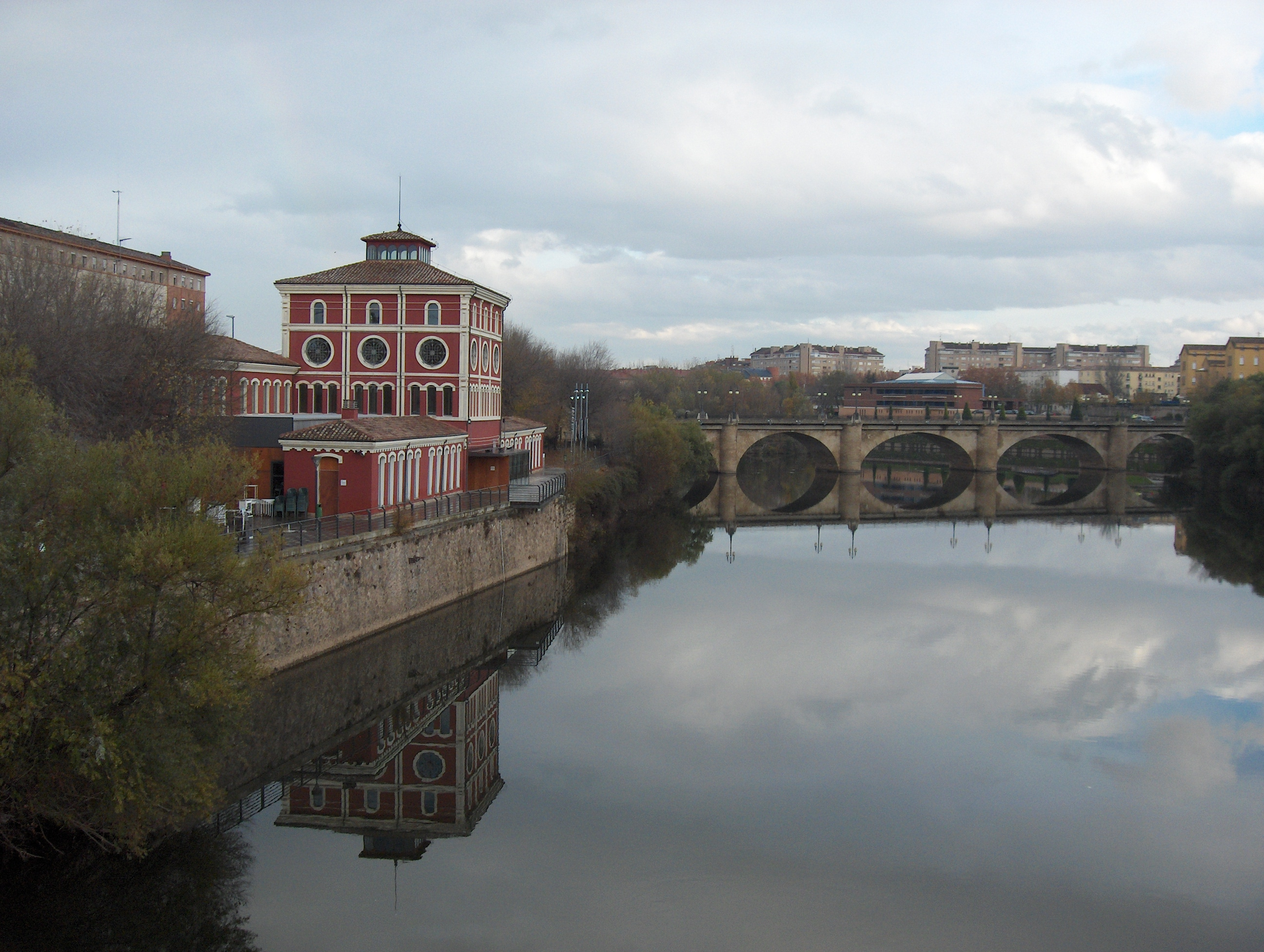
Science "House"

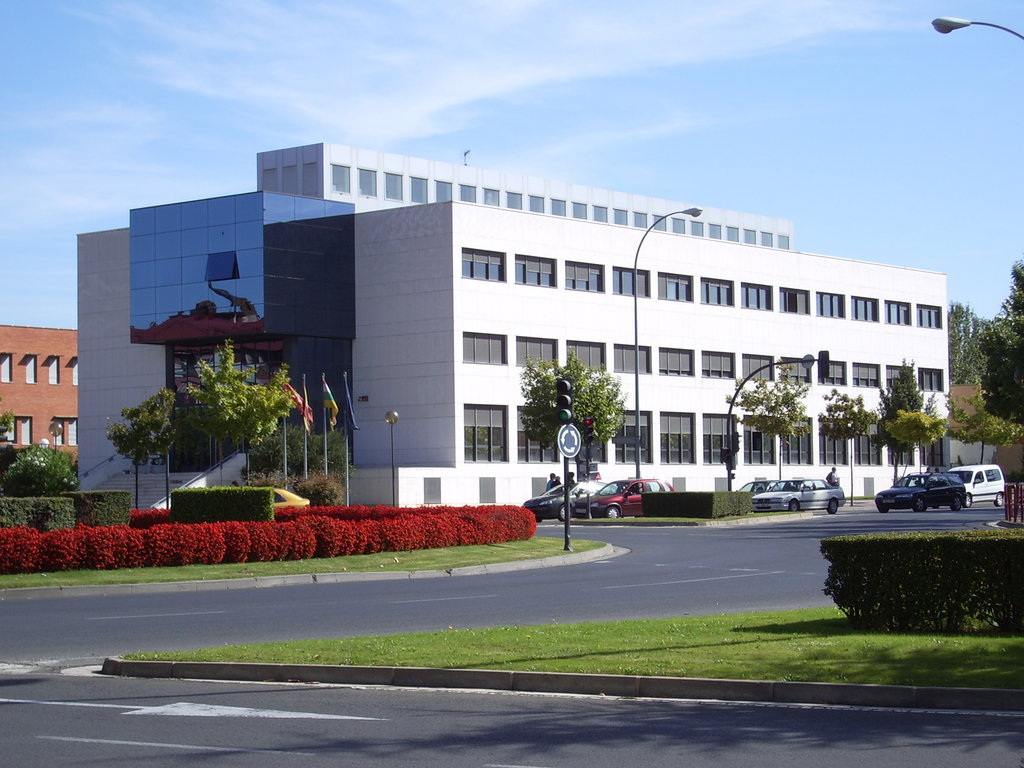
Universidad de La Rioja

== See also ==
- Etymology of La Rioja
