= Javier Santaolalla =

Spanish physicist, engineer, doctor in particle physics and scientific popularizer

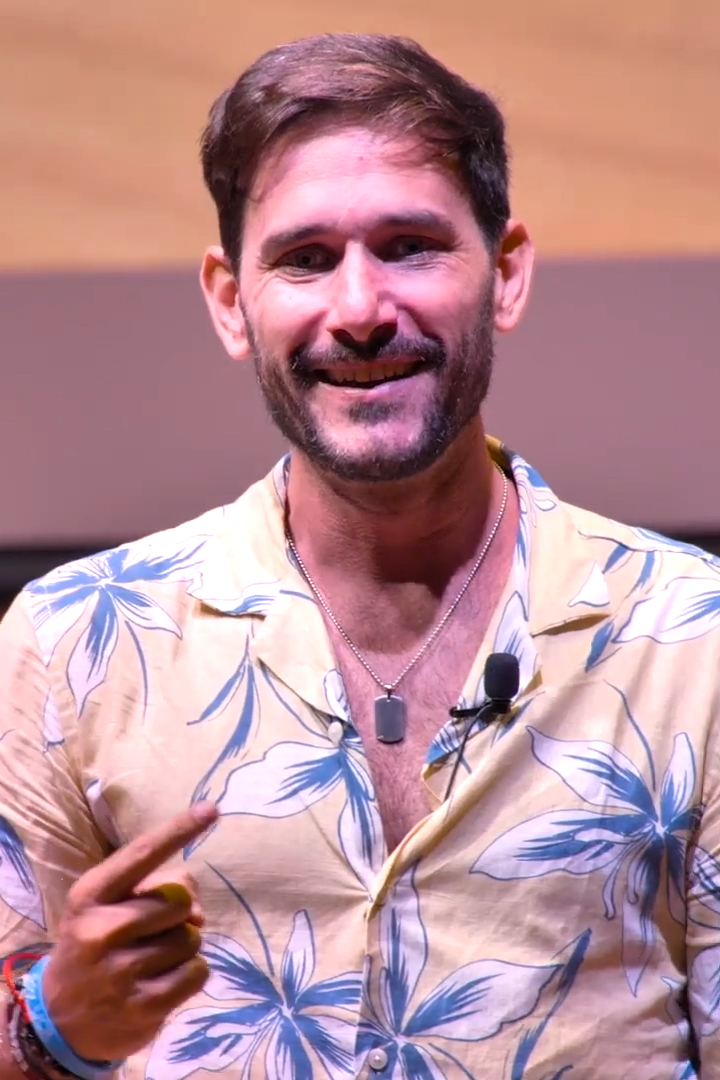
- Javier Santaolalla in 2022
- Born: Javier Santaolalla Camino; 31 August 1982 (age 43); Burgos, Spain
- Education: National University of Distance Education; Complutense University of Madrid; University of Las Palmas de Gran Canaria
- Occupations: Scientific disseminator, physicist and telecommunications engineer
- Employer: CERN
- Awards: Civil Order of Alfonso X, the Wise

YouTube information
- Channel: Date un Vlog
- Years active: 2016–present
- Genre: Science
- Subscribers: 4 million
- Views: 1000 million
- Last updated: 14 October 2024

Javier Santaolalla Camino (born 31 August 1982) is a Spanish physicist, engineer, doctor in particle physics and scientific popularizer. He has worked at the National Center for Space Studies (CNES) in France, CIEMAT and the European Organization for Nuclear Research (CERN), where he was part of the team that discovered the Higgs boson through the Large Hadron Collider (LHS) from CMS Experiment.

In 2025, he was awarded the Civil Order of Alfonso X, the Wise.

== Biography ==
Javier Santaolalla Camino was born in Burgos, Spain. He studied Telecommunications Engineering at the University of Las Palmas de Gran Canaria. and has a degree in physical sciences from the Complutense University of Madrid (UCM). After being accepted at CERN to study for a master's degree, he received his doctorate in particle physics, also from the UCM, in 2012, with a thesis on electroweak processes in muon decay in the CMS experiment at the LHC. He has also coordinated the educational innovation project Creations, funded by the European Union.

Along with Santi García Cremades, Ana Payo Payo and Eduardo Sáenz de Cabezón, he is a member of the Big Van Ciencia group since 2013, dedicated to scientific outreach events. He participates in Órbita Laika, a late night science of scientific popularizer and humor talk show broadcast on the Spanish network La 2. He is the creator of the YouTube channels Date un voltio, Date un vlog, Date Un Show. For his scientific humor monologue for the Famelab contest, he received the 2015 Aquae Award. He has been described by Infolibre as "the greatest Spanish scientific popularizer on the web". Since February 2021, together with La gata de Schrödinger, he has presented the program Whaat!? How do you see it, from the RTVE digital platform, playz.

== Selected works ==
- Santaolalla, Javier (2016). El bosón de Higgs no te va a hacer la cama (in Spanish). La Esfera de los Libros. p. 369.
- Santaolalla, Javier (2017). Inteligencia Física (in Spanish). Plataforma. p. 159.
- Santaolalla, Javier (2022) ¿Qué hace un bosón como tú en un Big Bang como este? p. 404 ISBN 9788413843902

=== As co-author ===
- Big, Van (2016). Cómo explicar física cuántica a un gato zombi (in Spanish). Alfaguara. p. 198.
- Big, Van (2016). ¿Si venimos del mono?, del mono vendrás tú, yo vengo de Adán y Eva (in Spanish). La Esfera de los libros. p. 198.
