= Eduardo Sáenz de Cabezón =

Spanish mathematician

- Eduardo Sáenz de Cabezón Irigaray
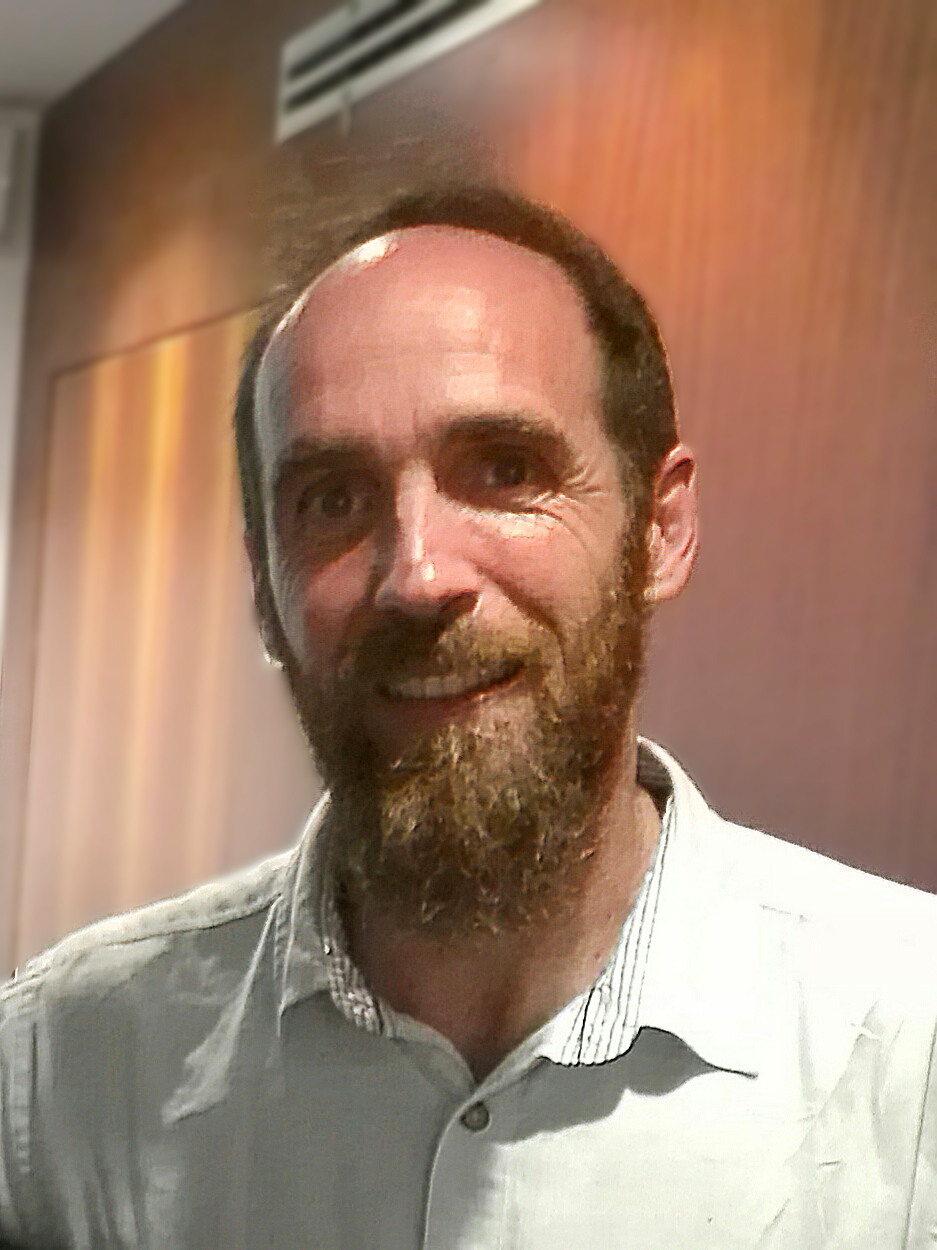
- Eduardo Sáenz in 2018
- Born: June 24, 1972 (age 54); Logroño (La Rioja), Spain
- Education: University of La Rioja
- Awards: Famelab (2013)
- Scientific career
- Fields: Computational algebra
- Workplaces: University of La Rioja; London School of Economics
- Thesis: Combinatorial Koszul homology: computations and applications (2008)
- Website: Derivando

Eduardo Sáenz de Cabezón Irigaray (born 24 June 1972, Logroño) is a Spanish mathematician, and professor of computer languages and systems at the University of La Rioja since 2001. He is a recognized specialist in scientific monologues. He develops his research in the area of computational algebra, to which he has contributed 25 research publications and collaborations with Spanish and European mathematicians such as Henry P. Wynn.

Cabezón is also known for disseminating mathematics through conferences, shows and talks for people of all ages around the world. He was the winner of competition for scientific monologues at Famelab Spain (2013) and at the Aquae Foundation (2014), also becoming a finalist at the Cheltenham Science Festival (United Kingdom).

== Career ==
Eduardo Sáenz de Cabezón studied during his youth at the Sagasta Institute in Logroño. After high school, he decided to study mathematics and computer science, inspired by a teacher passionate about mathematics. He was also licensed in theology at the Pontifical University of Comillas, and holds a PhD in mathematics from the University of La Rioja.

=== Doctoral thesis ===
Cabezón obtained his PhD with the thesis "Combinatorial Koszul homology: computations and applications" for which he obtained the grade of outstanding cum laude unanimously of the court. His thesis is framed within the area of computational algebra. In it, the homology of Koszul for monomial ideals is studied. In the thesis, Cabezón described the structure of this type of ideals based on his Koszul homology, described algorithms for the calculation of this homology, and implemented algorithms that show to be effective.

== Popular science ==
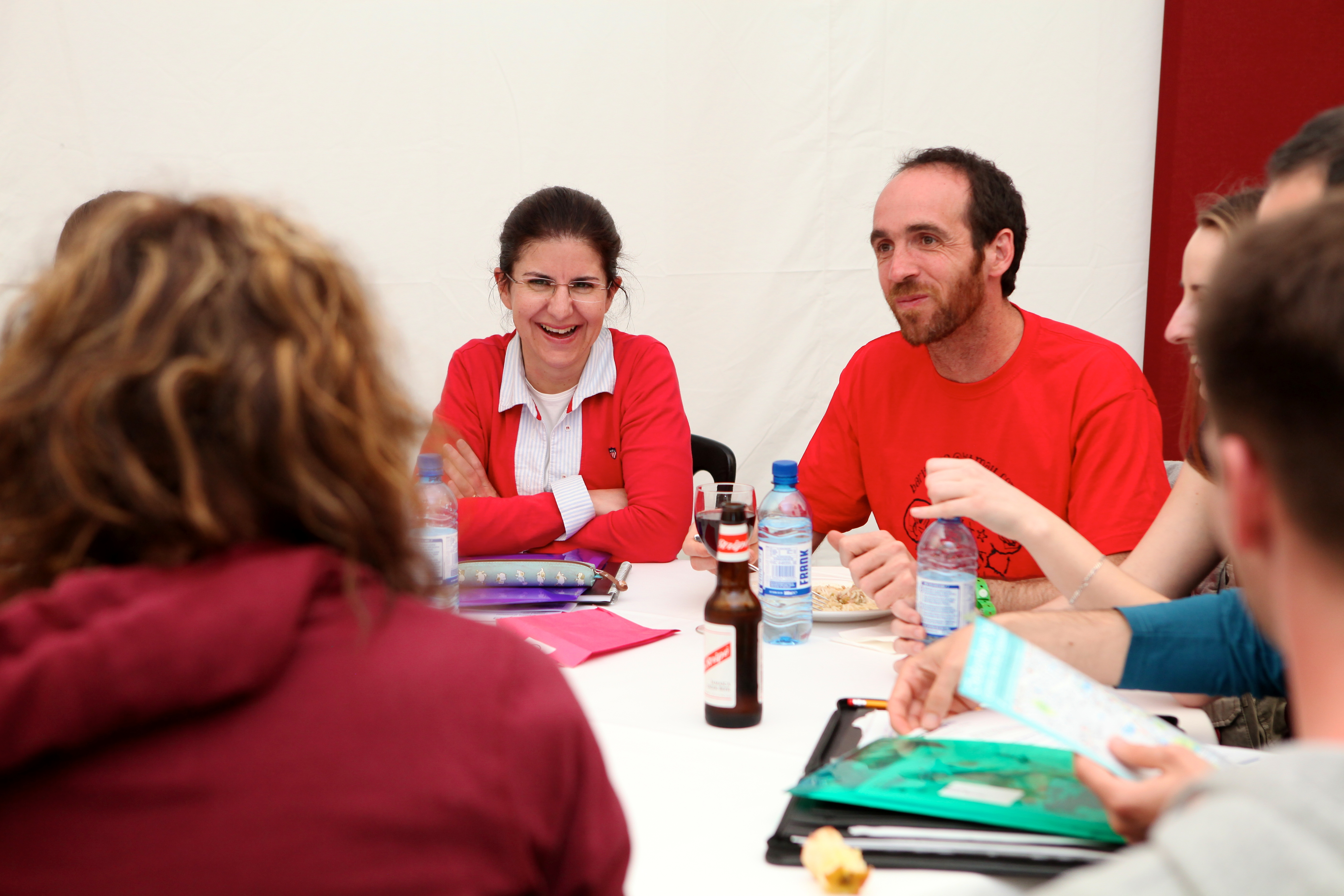
Eduardo Sáenz de Cabezón at Famelab 2013.

Cabezón is known for his career in popular science and mathematics. He has been telling stories in bars and cafes for 22 years, but has branched out to host and participate in a variety of mathematics communication events:

=== Events and conferences ===
- He is a member and founder of a group of active scientists and researchers called Big Van Science since 2013, dedicated to scientific dissemination with the aim of bringing scientific communication to all types of audiences. He is also the author of the mathematical show "El baúl de Pitágoras", which was shown in theaters and bars in several cities in Spain since 2012.
- He has participated with the TED organization doing conferences and lectures on the mathematical world.

=== TV ===
- He is presenter of the Spanish late night show of science and humor Órbita Laika.

=== Internet ===
- He currently has the YouTube channel called Derivando, in which he teaches and explains curiosities about the mathematical world, with more than 1.3 million subscribers.

=== Books ===
- He is the author of the book Inteligencia matemática which attempts to popularize mathematical concepts by comparing them to examples in everyday life. Eduardo argues that they are an opportunity to enjoy reality because: "whether we want it or not, we all have a mathematician in our interior, who maybe got scared at school and remains hidden in a corner".
- He is also co-author of the book Gardner para aficionados: Juegos de matemática recreativa.
