= El Cortijo =

- Populated place
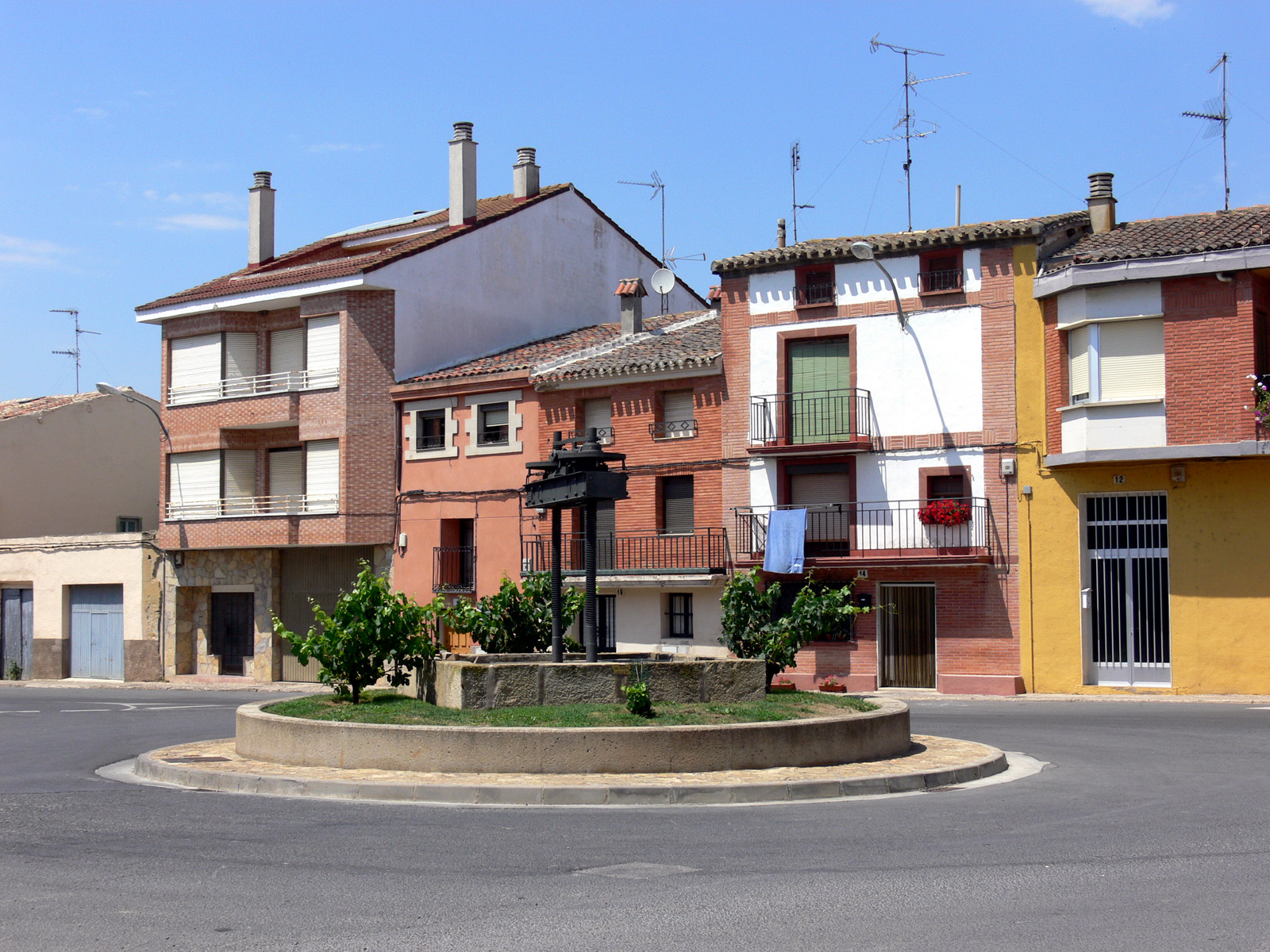

- Location within La Rioja, Spain Location within Spain
- Country: Spain
- Autonomous community: La Rioja
- Comarca: Logroño

Population
  - Total: 224
- Postal code: 26005

El Cortijo is a village in the municipality of Logroño, in the province and autonomous community of La Rioja, Spain. As of 2018 had a population of 224 people.
