= 1987 Riojan regional election =

Election in the Spanish region of La Rioja

- 10 June 1987

All 33 seats in the General Deputation of La Rioja 17 seats needed for a majority
- Opinion polls
- Registered: 201,738 ▲3.5%
- Turnout: 146,258 (72.5%) ▲2.3 pp
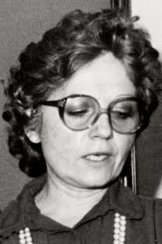

| | First party | Second party | Third party |
|---|---|---|---|
| Leader | Alicia Izaguirre | Joaquín Espert | Manuel Fernández Ilarraza |
| Party | PSOE | AP | CDS |
| Leader since | 21 February 1987 | 27 March 1987 | 1987 |
| Last election | 18 seats, 47.2% | 15 seats, 40.0% (Note: Results for AP–PDP–UL in the 1983 election.) | 0 seats, 2.4% |
| Seats won | 14 | 13 | 4 |
| Seat change | ▼4 | ▼2 | ▲4 |
| Popular vote | 57,178 | 50,179 | 15,640 |
| Percentage | 39.6% | 34.8% | 10.8% |
| Swing | ▼7.6 pp | ▼5.2 pp | ▲8.4 pp |
| | Fourth party |
| Leader | Luis J. Rodríguez Moroy |
| Party | PR+ |
| Leader since | 6 December 1982 |
| Last election | 2 seats, 7.5% |
| Seats won | 2 |
| Seat change | 0 |
| Popular vote | 9,212 |
| Percentage | 6.4% |
| Swing | ▼1.1 pp |
President before election
José María de Miguel
PSOE
Elected President
Joaquín Espert
AP

The 1987 Riojan regional election was held on 10 June 1987 to elect the 2nd General Deputation of the autonomous community of La Rioja, Spain. All 33 seats in the General Deputation were up for election. It was held concurrently with regional elections in twelve other autonomous communities and local elections all throughout Spain, as well as the 1987 European Parliament election.

Incumbent president José María de Miguel did not seek re-election out of political differences with his party, the Spanish Socialist Workers' Party (PSOE), which instead presented Alicia Izaguirre, former civil governor of Álava, as their candidate. The party came out first by winning the most votes and seats, but lost its absolute majority and suffered an important loss of support compared to its 1983 result. A minority government was formed with the support of the second and fourth-most voted parties: the People's Alliance (AP), which lost votes and seats from the previous election amid the breakup of the People's Coalition, and the Progressive Riojan Party (PRP). Together, they gathered 15 seats, one more than the PSOE, and were able to secure the election of AP leader, Joaquín Espert, through the decisive abstention of the Democratic and Social Centre (CDS), which became the third political force in the community with 4 seats and 10.8% of the share.

The AP–PRP agreement would only last until December 1989. The PRP and two former CDS deputies would go on to join a PSOE motion of no confidence against Espert, resulting in Socialist José Ignacio Pérez Sáenz becoming new regional president in January 1990 of a PSOE–PRP government.

== Overview ==
=== Electoral system ===
The General Deputation of La Rioja was the devolved, unicameral legislature of the autonomous community of La Rioja, having legislative power in regional matters as defined by the Spanish Constitution and the Riojan Statute of Autonomy, as well as the ability to vote confidence in or withdraw it from a regional president.

Voting for the General Deputation was on the basis of universal suffrage, which comprised all nationals over 18 years of age, registered in La Rioja and in full enjoyment of their political rights. The 33 members of the General Deputation of La Rioja were elected using the D'Hondt method and a closed list proportional representation, with an electoral threshold of five percent of valid votes—which included blank ballots—being applied regionally.

=== Election date ===
The term of the General Deputation of La Rioja expired four years after the date of its previous election. The election decree was required to be issued no later than the twenty-fifth day prior to the expiration date of parliament and published on the following day in the Official Gazette of La Rioja, with election day taking place between the fifty-fourth and the sixtieth day from publication and set so as to make them coincide with other concurrent elections when possible. The previous election was held on 8 May 1983, which meant that the legislature's term would have expired on 8 May 1987. The election decree was required to be published no later than 14 April 1987, with the election taking place no later than the sixtieth day from publication, setting the latest possible election date for the General Deputation on 13 June 1987.

The General Deputation of La Rioja could not be dissolved before the expiration date of parliament except in the event of an investiture process failing to elect a regional president within a two-month period from the first ballot. In such a case, the General Deputation was to be automatically dissolved and a snap election called, with elected lawmakers serving the remainder of its original four-year term.

== Parliamentary composition ==
The General Deputation of La Rioja was officially dissolved on 14 April 1987, after the publication of the dissolution decree in the Official Gazette of La Rioja. The table below shows the composition of the parliamentary groups in the General Deputation at the time of dissolution.

Parliamentary composition in April 1987
| Groups | Parties | Legislators | |
| Groups | Parties | Seats | Total |
|---|---|---|---|
| Socialist Parliamentary Group | PSOE | 18 | 18 |
| People's Parliamentary Group | AP | 12 | 12 |
| Mixed Parliamentary Group | PDP | 3 | 5 |
| Mixed Parliamentary Group | PRP | 2 | 5 |

== Parties and candidates ==
The electoral law allowed for parties and federations registered in the interior ministry, coalitions and groupings of electors to present lists of candidates. Parties and federations intending to form a coalition ahead of an election were required to inform the relevant Electoral Commission within ten days of the election call, whereas groupings of electors needed to secure the signature of at least one percent of the electorate in La Rioja, disallowing electors from signing for more than one list of candidates.

Below is a list of the main parties and electoral alliances which contested the election:

| Candidacy | Parties and alliances | Leading candidate | Ideology | Previous result | | Gov. | Ref. |
| Candidacy | Parties and alliances | Leading candidate | Ideology | Vote % | Seats | Gov. | Ref. |
|---|---|---|---|---|---|---|---|
| PSOE | List: Spanish Socialist Workers' Party (PSOE) | Alicia Izaguirre | Social democracy | 47.2% | 18 | Yes | |
| AP | List: People's Alliance (AP) | Joaquín Espert | Conservatism; National conservatism | 40.0% | 15 | No | |
| PDP | List: People's Democratic Party (PDP) | Domingo Álvarez Ruiz de Viñaspre | Christian democracy | 40.0% | 15 | No | |
| PRP | List: Progressive Riojan Party (PRP) | Luis Javier Rodríguez Moroy | Regionalism; Progressivism | 7.5% | 2 | No | |
| CDS | List: Democratic and Social Centre (CDS) | Manuel Fernández Ilarraza | Centrism; Liberalism | 2.4% | 0 | No | |

== Opinion polls ==
The table below lists voting intention estimates in reverse chronological order, showing the most recent first and using the dates when the survey fieldwork was done, as opposed to the date of publication. Where the fieldwork dates are unknown, the date of publication is given instead. The highest percentage figure in each polling survey is displayed with its background shaded in the leading party's colour. If a tie ensues, this is applied to the figures with the highest percentages. The "Lead" column on the right shows the percentage-point difference between the parties with the highest percentages in a poll. When available, seat projections determined by the polling organisations are displayed below (or in place of) the percentages in a smaller font; 17 seats were required for an absolute majority in the General Deputation of La Rioja.

| Polling firm/Commissioner | Fieldwork date | Sample size | Turnout | PSOE | AP–PDP–PL | PRP | CDS | IU | AP | PDP | Lead |
|---|---|---|---|---|---|---|---|---|---|---|---|
| 1987 regional election | 10 Jun 1987 | —N/a | 72.5 | 39.6; 14 | – | 6.4; 2 | 10.8; 4 | 2.4; 0 | 34.8; 13 | 3.3; 0 | 4.8 |
| Demoscopia/El País | 22–26 May 1987 | ? | 74 | 36.5; 13/14 | – | – | 13.5; 5 | 4.9; 0/1 | 37.8; 14 | 1.4; 0 | 1.3 |
| Sofemasa/AP | 16 Apr 1987 | ? | ? | 38.7 | – | – | 17.7 | – | 32.2 | – | 6.5 |
| 1986 general election | 22 Jun 1986 | —N/a | 74.3 | 43.9 (16) | 39.2 (14) | – | 10.1 (3) | 2.0 (0) | (Note: Within CP.) | | 4.7 |
| 1983 regional election | 8 May 1983 | —N/a | 70.2 | 47.2; 18 | 40.0; 15 | 7.5; 2 | 2.4; 0 | 2.2 (Note: Results for PCE in the 1983 election.); 0 | | | 7.2 |

== Results ==
← Summary of the 10 June 1987 General Deputation of La Rioja election results →
| Parties and alliances | Popular vote | | | Seats | |
| Parties and alliances | Votes | % | ±pp | Total | +/− |
|---|---|---|---|---|---|
| Spanish Socialist Workers' Party (PSOE) | 57,178 | 39.64 | −7.53 | 14 | −4 |
| People's Alliance (AP)^{1} | 50,179 | 34.78 | −5.20 | 13 | −2 |
| Democratic and Social Centre (CDS) | 15,640 | 10.84 | +8.43 | 4 | +4 |
| Progressive Riojan Party (PRP) | 9,212 | 6.39 | −1.07 | 2 | ±0 |
| People's Democratic Party (PDP) | 4,721 | 3.27 | New | 0 | ±0 |
| United Left (IU)^{2} | 3,478 | 2.41 | +0.24 | 0 | ±0 |
| Workers' Party of Spain–Communist Unity (PTE–UC) | 1,400 | 0.97 | New | 0 | ±0 |
| Blank ballots | 2,452 | 1.70 | +0.89 | | |
| Total | 144,260 | | | 33 | −2 |
| Valid votes | 144,260 | 98.63 | −0.20 | | |
| Invalid votes | 1,998 | 1.37 | +0.20 | | |
| Votes cast / turnout | 146,258 | 72.50 | +2.26 | | |
| Abstentions | 55,480 | 27.50 | −2.26 | | |
| Registered voters | 201,738 | | | | |
Sources
Footnotes: ^{1} People's Alliance results are compared to People's Coalition totals in the 1983 election.; ^{2} United Left results are compared to Communist Party of Spain totals in the 1983 election.

Popular vote
| PSOE | 39.64% |
| AP | 34.78% |
| CDS | 10.84% |
| PRP | 6.39% |
| PDP | 3.27% |
| IU | 2.41% |
| PTE–UC | 0.97% |
| Blank ballots | 1.70% |

Seats
| PSOE | 42.42% |
| AP | 39.39% |
| CDS | 12.12% |
| PRP | 6.06% |

== Aftermath ==
=== Government formation ===
The PSOE candidate, Alicia Izaguirre, had been expected to become the new regional premier—and the first female president in a Spanish autonomous community—through an arrangement with the Democratic and Social Centre (CDS), under which the PSOE would support CDS's candidate to the presidency of the Parliament of La Rioja, Manuel Fernández Ilarraza, in exchange for the CDS allowing a PSOE minority government in the region. However, a last-ditch agreement between the opposition People's Alliance (AP) and Progressive Riojan Party (PRP), combined with the CDS proclaiming a policy of abstention in order to allow the government of the "largest minority", resulted in the election of AP's candidate Joaquín Espert.

Investiture; Joaquín Espert (AP)
| Ballot → | 22 July 1987 | 24 July 1987 |
| Required majority → | 17 out of 33 | Simple |
| Yes: • AP (13); • PRP (2) | 15 / 33 | 15 / 33 |
| No: • PSOE (14) | 14 / 33 | 14 / 33 |
| Abstentions: • CDS (4) | 4 / 33 | 4 / 33 |
| Absentees | 0 / 33 | 0 / 33 |

=== 1990 motion of no confidence ===
The minority government resulting from the AP–PRP agreement with the abstention from the CDS was forced into a precarious position which remained for its entire duration. In July 1988, PSOE's Félix Palomo, which had held the presidency of the Parliament from 1983 to 1987, was returned to the post as a result of two CDS deputies splitting away from the party and a lack of agreement between the other parties to maintain Ilarraza in office. In January 1989, a "pact for the governance of the autonomous community" was signed between the newly-refounded People's Party (PP), CDS and PRP, which would see the later entering into a coalition government with PP and the two remaining deputies from the CDS granting confidence and supply support from the outside. This pact would last until the designation of PSOE senator Marlo Fraile in December 1989 fractured the PP–PRP government after PRP's deputies voted for Fraile, which resulted in the PRP abandoning the government.

By the end of December, the PSOE announced a motion of no confidence on Espert in order to put an end to the permanent situation of instability within the regional government. The announcement had the backing of one out of the two PRP deputies—with PRP member Damián Saez Angulo going into the Mixed Group over disagreements with his party's new strategy—and the two ex-CDS deputies, who would end up joining the PRP. The motion succeeded after gathering the support of an absolute majority of deputies, with the two loyal CDS deputies leaving parliament before the vote in protest for what they dubbed as "transfuguism" of their two former members for joining the PRP.

Motion of no confidence José Ignacio Pérez Sáenz (PSOE)
| Ballot → | 8 January 1990 |
| Required majority → | 17 out of 33 |
| Yes: • PSOE (14); • PRP (3) | 17 / 33 |
| No: • PP (13) | 13 / 33 |
| Abstentions: • Independent (1) | 1 / 33 |
| Absentees: • CDS (2) | 2 / 33 |
