= Results of the 1987 European Parliament election in Spain =

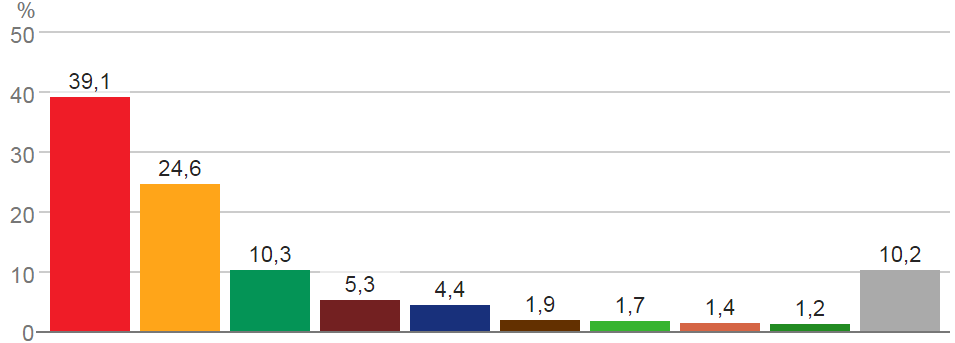
(Spain)	Main: 1987 European Parliament election in Spain
← 0000 10 June 1987 1989 →
Party		Votes	%	Seats
	PSOE	7,522,706	39.1%	28
	AP	4,747,283	24.6%	17
	CDS	1,976,093	10.3%	7
	IU	1,011,830	5.3%	3
	CiU	853,603	4.4%	3
	HB	360,952	1.9%	1
	EA–ERC–PNG	326,911	1.7%	1
	IP	261,328	1.4%	0
	PNV–PGN	226,570	1.2%	0
	Others	1,973,950	10.2%	0
Total		19,261,226	100.0%	60

This article presents the results breakdown of the election to the European Parliament held in Spain on 10 June 1987. The following tables show detailed results in each of the country's 17 autonomous communities and in the autonomous cities of Ceuta and Melilla.

== Nationwide ==
Summary of the 10 June 1987 European Parliament election results in Spain →
Parties and alliances	Popular vote			Seats	
Parties and alliances	Votes	%	±pp	Total	+/−
Spanish Socialist Workers' Party (PSOE)	7,522,706	39.06	n/a	28	n/a
People's Alliance (AP)	4,747,283	24.65	n/a	17	n/a
Democratic and Social Centre (CDS)	1,976,093	10.26	n/a	7	n/a
United Left (IU)	1,011,830	5.25	n/a	3	n/a
Convergence and Union (CiU)	853,603	4.43	n/a	3	n/a
Popular Unity (HB)	360,952	1.87	n/a	1	n/a
Coalition for the Europe of the Peoples (EA–ERC–PNG)	326,911	1.70	n/a	1	n/a
Left of the Peoples (IP)	261,328	1.36	n/a	0	n/a
Europeanist Union (PNV–PGN)	226,570	1.18	n/a	0	n/a
Workers' Party of Spain–Communist Unity (PTE–UC)	222,680	1.16	n/a	0	n/a
Andalusian Party (PA)	185,550	0.96	n/a	0	n/a
People's Democratic Party (PDP)	170,866	0.89	n/a	0	n/a
Valencian Union (UV)	162,128	0.84	n/a	0	n/a
National Front (FN)	122,799	0.64	n/a	0	n/a
Social Action (AS)	116,761	0.61	n/a	0	n/a
The Greens (LV)	107,625	0.56	n/a	0	n/a
Regionalist Aragonese Party (PAR)	105,865	0.55	n/a	0	n/a
Canarian Independent Groups (AIC)	96,895	0.50	n/a	0	n/a
Workers' Socialist Party (PST)	77,132	0.40	n/a	0	n/a
Confederation of the Greens (CV)	65,574	0.34	n/a	0	n/a
Galician Nationalist Bloc (BNG)	53,116	0.28	n/a	0	n/a
United Extremadura (EU)	39,369	0.20	n/a	0	n/a
Revolutionary Workers' Party of Spain (PORE)	30,157	0.16	n/a	0	n/a
National Assembly of Medicine Students and Associates (ANEMYA)	30,143	0.16	n/a	0	n/a
Internationalist Socialist Workers' Party (POSI)	25,270	0.13	n/a	0	n/a
Social Democratic Coalition (CSD)	25,058	0.13	n/a	0	n/a
Spanish Phalanx of the CNSO (FE–JONS)	23,407	0.12	n/a	0	n/a
Humanist Platform (PH–FV)	22,333	0.12	n/a	0	n/a
Communist Unification of Spain (UCE)	21,482	0.11	n/a	0	n/a
Majorcan Union (UM)	19,066	0.10	n/a	0	n/a
Valencian Coalition Party (PCV)	14,749	0.08	n/a	0	n/a
Regionalist Party of Cantabria (PRC)	14,553	0.08	n/a	0	n/a
Nationalist Party of Castile and León (PANCAL)	12,616	0.07	n/a	0	n/a
Andalusian Liberation (LA)	9,881	0.05	n/a	0	n/a
Democratic Spanish Party (PED)	9,146	0.05	n/a	0	n/a
Blank ballots	189,729	0.99	n/a		
Total	19,261,226			60	n/a
Valid votes	19,261,226	98.81	n/a		
Invalid votes	232,872	1.19	n/a		
Votes cast / turnout	19,494,098	68.52	n/a		
Abstentions	8,956,393	31.48	n/a		
Registered voters	28,450,491				

== Autonomous communities ==
=== Andalusia ===
Summary of the 10 June 1987 European Parliament election results in Andalusia →
Parties and alliances	Popular vote		
Parties and alliances	Votes	%	±pp
Spanish Socialist Workers' Party (PSOE)	1,491,525	48.27	n/a
People's Alliance (AP)	657,410	21.28	n/a
United Left (IU)	333,924	10.81	n/a
Democratic and Social Centre (CDS)	223,034	7.22	n/a
Andalusian Party (PA)	173,002	5.60	n/a
Workers' Party of Spain–Communist Unity (PTE–UC)	42,466	1.37	n/a
Social Action (AS)	32,789	1.06	n/a
National Front (FN)	16,715	0.54	n/a
People's Democratic Party (PDP)	14,795	0.48	n/a
Workers' Socialist Party (PST)	10,296	0.33	n/a
Popular Unity (HB)	9,904	0.32	n/a
The Greens (LV)	9,484	0.31	n/a
Left of the Peoples (IP)	7,636	0.25	n/a
Revolutionary Workers' Party of Spain (PORE)	6,115	0.20	n/a
Confederation of the Greens (CV)	5,422	0.18	n/a
National Assembly of Medicine Students and Associates (ANEMYA)	3,793	0.12	n/a
Andalusian Liberation (LA)	3,533	0.11	n/a
Internationalist Socialist Workers' Party (POSI)	3,353	0.11	n/a
Spanish Phalanx of the CNSO (FE–JONS)	2,978	0.10	n/a
Social Democratic Coalition (CSD)	2,972	0.10	n/a
Communist Unification of Spain (UCE)	2,958	0.10	n/a
United Extremadura (EU)	2,608	0.08	n/a
Humanist Platform (PH–FV)	2,026	0.07	n/a
Coalition for the Europe of the Peoples (EA–ERC–PNG)	1,597	0.05	n/a
Convergence and Union (CiU)	1,160	0.04	n/a
Regionalist Aragonese Party (PAR)	1,124	0.04	n/a
Canarian Independent Groups (AIC)	1,107	0.04	n/a
Europeanist Union (PNV–PGN)	1,099	0.04	n/a
Valencian Union (UV)	1,053	0.03	n/a
Galician Nationalist Bloc (BNG)	1,033	0.03	n/a
Valencian Coalition Party (PCV)	990	0.03	n/a
Democratic Spanish Party (PED)	970	0.03	n/a
Nationalist Party of Castile and León (PANCAL)	772	0.02	n/a
Blank ballots	20,105	0.65	n/a
Total	3,089,748		
Valid votes	3,089,748	98.80	n/a
Invalid votes	37,478	1.20	n/a
Votes cast / turnout	3,127,226	65.80	n/a
Abstentions	1,625,566	34.20	n/a
Registered voters	4,752,792		

=== Aragon ===
Summary of the 10 June 1987 European Parliament election results in Aragon →
Parties and alliances	Popular vote		
Parties and alliances	Votes	%	±pp
Spanish Socialist Workers' Party (PSOE)	245,264	38.40	n/a
People's Alliance (AP)	156,396	24.49	n/a
Regionalist Aragonese Party (PAR)	91,111	14.26	n/a
Democratic and Social Centre (CDS)	72,644	11.37	n/a
United Left (IU)	21,789	3.41	n/a
Workers' Party of Spain–Communist Unity (PTE–UC)	8,533	1.34	n/a
People's Democratic Party (PDP)	5,438	0.85	n/a
National Front (FN)	4,255	0.67	n/a
Left of the Peoples (IP)	3,955	0.62	n/a
Popular Unity (HB)	2,985	0.47	n/a
Social Action (AS)	2,715	0.43	n/a
Workers' Socialist Party (PST)	2,446	0.38	n/a
The Greens (LV)	2,268	0.36	n/a
Confederation of the Greens (CV)	1,698	0.27	n/a
Humanist Platform (PH–FV)	1,029	0.16	n/a
Internationalist Socialist Workers' Party (POSI)	855	0.13	n/a
Social Democratic Coalition (CSD)	833	0.13	n/a
Communist Unification of Spain (UCE)	785	0.12	n/a
Revolutionary Workers' Party of Spain (PORE)	717	0.11	n/a
Convergence and Union (CiU)	663	0.10	n/a
Spanish Phalanx of the CNSO (FE–JONS)	646	0.10	n/a
Coalition for the Europe of the Peoples (EA–ERC–PNG)	616	0.10	n/a
National Assembly of Medicine Students and Associates (ANEMYA)	556	0.09	n/a
Europeanist Union (PNV–PGN)	282	0.04	n/a
United Extremadura (EU)	270	0.04	n/a
Andalusian Party (PA)	239	0.04	n/a
Democratic Spanish Party (PED)	235	0.04	n/a
Nationalist Party of Castile and León (PANCAL)	228	0.04	n/a
Galician Nationalist Bloc (BNG)	190	0.03	n/a
Canarian Independent Groups (AIC)	187	0.03	n/a
Valencian Union (UV)	182	0.03	n/a
Valencian Coalition Party (PCV)	161	0.03	n/a
Andalusian Liberation (LA)	141	0.02	n/a
Blank ballots	8,409	1.32	n/a
Total	638,721		
Valid votes	638,721	98.72	n/a
Invalid votes	8,275	1.28	n/a
Votes cast / turnout	646,996	69.68	n/a
Abstentions	281,588	30.32	n/a
Registered voters	928,584		

=== Asturias ===
Summary of the 10 June 1987 European Parliament election results in Asturias →
Parties and alliances	Popular vote		
Parties and alliances	Votes	%	±pp
Spanish Socialist Workers' Party (PSOE)	244,323	42.43	n/a
People's Alliance (AP)	149,321	25.93	n/a
Democratic and Social Centre (CDS)	83,433	14.49	n/a
United Left (IU)	56,509	9.81	n/a
Workers' Party of Spain–Communist Unity (PTE–UC)	6,467	1.12	n/a
Popular Unity (HB)	5,629	0.98	n/a
People's Democratic Party (PDP)	2,931	0.51	n/a
National Front (FN)	2,876	0.50	n/a
National Assembly of Medicine Students and Associates (ANEMYA)	2,588	0.45	n/a
Social Action (AS)	2,475	0.43	n/a
The Greens (LV)	2,190	0.38	n/a
Workers' Socialist Party (PST)	2,069	0.36	n/a
Left of the Peoples (IP)	1,633	0.28	n/a
Confederation of the Greens (CV)	1,210	0.21	n/a
Social Democratic Coalition (CSD)	884	0.15	n/a
Revolutionary Workers' Party of Spain (PORE)	754	0.13	n/a
Spanish Phalanx of the CNSO (FE–JONS)	681	0.12	n/a
Communist Unification of Spain (UCE)	680	0.12	n/a
Humanist Platform (PH–FV)	641	0.11	n/a
Coalition for the Europe of the Peoples (EA–ERC–PNG)	562	0.10	n/a
Internationalist Socialist Workers' Party (POSI)	476	0.08	n/a
Europeanist Union (PNV–PGN)	333	0.06	n/a
Convergence and Union (CiU)	212	0.04	n/a
United Extremadura (EU)	202	0.04	n/a
Galician Nationalist Bloc (BNG)	193	0.03	n/a
Democratic Spanish Party (PED)	186	0.03	n/a
Regionalist Aragonese Party (PAR)	176	0.03	n/a
Andalusian Party (PA)	159	0.03	n/a
Canarian Independent Groups (AIC)	144	0.03	n/a
Valencian Union (UV)	133	0.02	n/a
Nationalist Party of Castile and León (PANCAL)	126	0.02	n/a
Valencian Coalition Party (PCV)	124	0.02	n/a
Andalusian Liberation (LA)	105	0.02	n/a
Blank ballots	5,457	0.95	n/a
Total	575,882		
Valid votes	575,882	98.66	n/a
Invalid votes	7,803	1.34	n/a
Votes cast / turnout	583,685	66.76	n/a
Abstentions	290,602	33.24	n/a
Registered voters	874,287		

=== Balearics ===
Summary of the 10 June 1987 European Parliament election results in the Balearics →
Parties and alliances	Popular vote		
Parties and alliances	Votes	%	±pp
People's Alliance (AP)	120,232	35.94	n/a
Spanish Socialist Workers' Party (PSOE)	114,420	34.20	n/a
Democratic and Social Centre (CDS)	39,779	11.89	n/a
Majorcan Union (UM)	19,066	5.70	n/a
Socialist Party of Mallorca–Nationalist Left (Left of the Peoples) (PSM–EN)	9,885	2.95	n/a
United Left (IU)	7,389	2.21	n/a
People's Democratic Party (PDP)	5,300	1.58	n/a
Social Action (AS)	2,587	0.77	n/a
Popular Unity (HB)	1,471	0.44	n/a
The Greens (LV)	1,243	0.37	n/a
Workers' Party of Spain–Communist Unity (PTE–UC)	1,115	0.33	n/a
Convergence and Union (CiU)	1,054	0.32	n/a
Confederation of the Greens (CV)	1,029	0.31	n/a
Workers' Socialist Party (PST)	869	0.26	n/a
National Front (FN)	781	0.23	n/a
Republican Left of Catalonia (For the Europe of the Nations) (ERC)	533	0.16	n/a
Social Democratic Coalition (CSD)	440	0.13	n/a
Internationalist Socialist Workers' Party (POSI)	384	0.11	n/a
Revolutionary Workers' Party of Spain (PORE)	347	0.10	n/a
Andalusian Party (PA)	293	0.09	n/a
Spanish Phalanx of the CNSO (FE–JONS)	288	0.09	n/a
Communist Unification of Spain (UCE)	283	0.08	n/a
National Assembly of Medicine Students and Associates (ANEMYA)	248	0.07	n/a
United Extremadura (EU)	245	0.07	n/a
Europeanist Union (PNV–PGN)	201	0.06	n/a
Regionalist Aragonese Party (PAR)	186	0.06	n/a
Democratic Spanish Party (PED)	166	0.05	n/a
Humanist Platform (PH–FV)	156	0.05	n/a
Valencian Union (UV)	144	0.04	n/a
Nationalist Party of Castile and León (PANCAL)	142	0.04	n/a
Andalusian Liberation (LA)	136	0.04	n/a
Galician Nationalist Bloc (BNG)	124	0.04	n/a
Valencian Coalition Party (PCV)	116	0.03	n/a
Canarian Independent Groups (AIC)	101	0.03	n/a
Blank ballots	3,796	1.13	n/a
Total	334,549		
Valid votes	334,549	98.65	n/a
Invalid votes	4,585	1.35	n/a
Votes cast / turnout	339,134	66.76	n/a
Abstentions	168,822	33.24	n/a
Registered voters	507,956		

=== Basque Country ===
Summary of the 10 June 1987 European Parliament election results in the Basque Country →
Parties and alliances	Popular vote		
Parties and alliances	Votes	%	±pp
Popular Unity (HB)	210,430	19.60	n/a
Basque Nationalist Party (Europeanist Union) (EAJ/PNV)	208,135	19.39	n/a
Socialist Party of the Basque Country (PSE–PSOE)	204,522	19.05	n/a
Basque Solidarity (Europe of the Peoples) (EA)	172,411	16.06	n/a
Basque Country Left (Left of the Peoples) (EE)	104,315	9.72	n/a
People's Alliance (AP)	76,920	7.16	n/a
Democratic and Social Centre (CDS)	41,700	3.88	n/a
United Left (IU)	10,480	0.98	n/a
Workers' Party of Spain–Communist Unity (PTE–UC)	8,421	0.78	n/a
Workers' Socialist Party (PST)	3,340	0.31	n/a
The Greens (LV)	2,866	0.27	n/a
National Assembly of Medicine Students and Associates (ANEMYA)	2,638	0.25	n/a
National Front (FN)	2,287	0.21	n/a
People's Democratic Party (PDP)	2,173	0.20	n/a
Confederation of the Greens (CV)	1,812	0.17	n/a
Social Action (AS)	1,243	0.12	n/a
United Extremadura (EU)	1,146	0.11	n/a
Internationalist Socialist Workers' Party (POSI)	993	0.09	n/a
Social Democratic Coalition (CSD)	920	0.09	n/a
Revolutionary Workers' Party of Spain (PORE)	859	0.08	n/a
Communist Unification of Spain (UCE)	801	0.07	n/a
Humanist Platform (PH–FV)	734	0.07	n/a
Nationalist Party of Castile and León (PANCAL)	699	0.07	n/a
Galician Nationalist Bloc (BNG)	586	0.05	n/a
Spanish Phalanx of the CNSO (FE–JONS)	525	0.05	n/a
Andalusian Party (PA)	518	0.05	n/a
Regionalist Aragonese Party (PAR)	450	0.04	n/a
Convergence and Union (CiU)	296	0.03	n/a
Democratic Spanish Party (PED)	277	0.03	n/a
Valencian Union (UV)	248	0.02	n/a
Canarian Independent Groups (AIC)	232	0.02	n/a
Andalusian Liberation (LA)	228	0.02	n/a
Valencian Coalition Party (PCV)	160	0.01	n/a
Blank ballots	10,232	0.95	n/a
Total	1,073,597		
Valid votes	1,073,597	99.00	n/a
Invalid votes	10,821	1.00	n/a
Votes cast / turnout	1,084,418	67.29	n/a
Abstentions	527,222	32.71	n/a
Registered voters	1,611,640		

=== Canary Islands ===
Summary of the 10 June 1987 European Parliament election results in the Canary Islands →
Parties and alliances	Popular vote		
Parties and alliances	Votes	%	±pp
Spanish Socialist Workers' Party (PSOE)	200,405	32.70	n/a
Democratic and Social Centre (CDS)	125,598	20.50	n/a
People's Alliance (AP)	104,624	17.07	n/a
Canarian Independent Groups (AIC)	89,083	14.54	n/a
United Left (IU)	27,356	4.46	n/a
People's Democratic Party (PDP)	17,319	2.83	n/a
Left of the Peoples (IP)	7,915	1.29	n/a
The Greens (LV)	5,589	0.91	n/a
Social Action (AS)	4,767	0.78	n/a
Popular Unity (HB)	4,265	0.70	n/a
Workers' Party of Spain–Communist Unity (PTE–UC)	3,003	0.49	n/a
Workers' Socialist Party (PST)	2,564	0.42	n/a
Confederation of the Greens (CV)	1,400	0.23	n/a
National Front (FN)	1,394	0.23	n/a
Social Democratic Coalition (CSD)	1,355	0.22	n/a
Revolutionary Workers' Party of Spain (PORE)	815	0.13	n/a
Andalusian Party (PA)	775	0.13	n/a
Internationalist Socialist Workers' Party (POSI)	768	0.13	n/a
Communist Unification of Spain (UCE)	745	0.12	n/a
Humanist Platform (PH–FV)	715	0.12	n/a
Europeanist Union (PNV–PGN)	578	0.09	n/a
National Assembly of Medicine Students and Associates (ANEMYA)	547	0.09	n/a
United Extremadura (EU)	522	0.09	n/a
Convergence and Union (CiU)	516	0.08	n/a
Spanish Phalanx of the CNSO (FE–JONS)	463	0.08	n/a
Democratic Spanish Party (PED)	458	0.07	n/a
Coalition for the Europe of the Peoples (EA–ERC–PNG)	437	0.07	n/a
Galician Nationalist Bloc (BNG)	389	0.06	n/a
Valencian Coalition Party (PCV)	358	0.06	n/a
Nationalist Party of Castile and León (PANCAL)	349	0.06	n/a
Regionalist Aragonese Party (PAR)	347	0.06	n/a
Valencian Union (UV)	258	0.04	n/a
Andalusian Liberation (LA)	255	0.04	n/a
Blank ballots	6,840	1.12	n/a
Total	612,772		
Valid votes	612,772	98.73	n/a
Invalid votes	7,905	1.27	n/a
Votes cast / turnout	620,677	61.82	n/a
Abstentions	383,369	38.18	n/a
Registered voters	1,004,046		

=== Cantabria ===
Summary of the 10 June 1987 European Parliament election results in Cantabria →
Parties and alliances	Popular vote		
Parties and alliances	Votes	%	±pp
Spanish Socialist Workers' Party (PSOE)	107,541	36.28	n/a
People's Alliance (AP)	107,207	36.16	n/a
Democratic and Social Centre (CDS)	29,477	9.94	n/a
Regionalist Party of Cantabria (PRC)	14,553	4.91	n/a
United Left (IU)	9,946	3.35	n/a
People's Democratic Party (PDP)	4,720	1.59	n/a
National Front (FN)	3,531	1.19	n/a
Workers' Party of Spain–Communist Unity (PTE–UC)	3,090	1.04	n/a
Social Action (AS)	2,080	0.70	n/a
Popular Unity (HB)	2,052	0.69	n/a
Left of the Peoples (IP)	1,444	0.49	n/a
Workers' Socialist Party (PST)	1,286	0.43	n/a
The Greens (LV)	1,008	0.34	n/a
Spanish Phalanx of the CNSO (FE–JONS)	733	0.25	n/a
Internationalist Socialist Workers' Party (POSI)	537	0.18	n/a
Confederation of the Greens (CV)	501	0.17	n/a
National Assembly of Medicine Students and Associates (ANEMYA)	445	0.15	n/a
Humanist Platform (PH–FV)	415	0.14	n/a
Social Democratic Coalition (CSD)	358	0.12	n/a
Communist Unification of Spain (UCE)	290	0.10	n/a
Europeanist Union (PNV–PGN)	284	0.10	n/a
Coalition for the Europe of the Peoples (EA–ERC–PNG)	252	0.09	n/a
Revolutionary Workers' Party of Spain (PORE)	224	0.08	n/a
Convergence and Union (CiU)	127	0.04	n/a
Regionalist Aragonese Party (PAR)	121	0.04	n/a
United Extremadura (EU)	111	0.04	n/a
Democratic Spanish Party (PED)	105	0.04	n/a
Andalusian Party (PA)	94	0.03	n/a
Canarian Independent Groups (AIC)	92	0.03	n/a
Nationalist Party of Castile and León (PANCAL)	86	0.03	n/a
Galician Nationalist Bloc (BNG)	84	0.03	n/a
Valencian Union (UV)	78	0.03	n/a
Valencian Coalition Party (PCV)	73	0.02	n/a
Andalusian Liberation (LA)	40	0.01	n/a
Blank ballots	3,472	1.17	n/a
Total	296,457		
Valid votes	296,457	98.75	n/a
Invalid votes	3,757	1.25	n/a
Votes cast / turnout	300,214	76.00	n/a
Abstentions	94,829	24.00	n/a
Registered voters	395,043		

=== Castile and León ===
Summary of the 10 June 1987 European Parliament election results in Castile and León →
Parties and alliances	Popular vote		
Parties and alliances	Votes	%	±pp
People's Alliance (AP)	522,069	36.25	n/a
Spanish Socialist Workers' Party (PSOE)	505,706	35.11	n/a
Democratic and Social Centre (CDS)	249,870	17.35	n/a
United Left (IU)	36,278	2.52	n/a
People's Democratic Party (PDP)	23,392	1.62	n/a
Workers' Party of Spain–Communist Unity (PTE–UC)	14,468	1.00	n/a
National Front (FN)	9,545	0.66	n/a
The Greens (LV)	8,497	0.59	n/a
Social Action (AS)	6,498	0.45	n/a
Popular Unity (HB)	4,763	0.33	n/a
Nationalist Party of Castile and León (PANCAL)	4,457	0.31	n/a
Left of the Peoples (IP)	4,392	0.30	n/a
Workers' Socialist Party (PST)	4,184	0.29	n/a
Confederation of the Greens (CV)	3,546	0.25	n/a
National Assembly of Medicine Students and Associates (ANEMYA)	2,553	0.18	n/a
Social Democratic Coalition (CSD)	2,359	0.16	n/a
Spanish Phalanx of the CNSO (FE–JONS)	2,009	0.14	n/a
Revolutionary Workers' Party of Spain (PORE)	1,715	0.12	n/a
Humanist Platform (PH–FV)	1,622	0.11	n/a
Communist Unification of Spain (UCE)	1,578	0.11	n/a
United Extremadura (EU)	1,527	0.11	n/a
Internationalist Socialist Workers' Party (POSI)	1,516	0.11	n/a
Coalition for the Europe of the Peoples (EA–ERC–PNG)	1,181	0.08	n/a
Regionalist Aragonese Party (PAR)	771	0.05	n/a
Democratic Spanish Party (PED)	735	0.05	n/a
Europeanist Union (PNV–PGN)	718	0.05	n/a
Convergence and Union (CiU)	646	0.04	n/a
Galician Nationalist Bloc (BNG)	528	0.04	n/a
Canarian Independent Groups (AIC)	510	0.04	n/a
Valencian Union (UV)	499	0.03	n/a
Valencian Coalition Party (PCV)	483	0.03	n/a
Andalusian Party (PA)	453	0.03	n/a
Andalusian Liberation (LA)	386	0.01	n/a
Blank ballots	20,808	1.44	n/a
Total	1,440,262		
Valid votes	1,440,262	98.31	n/a
Invalid votes	24,750	1.69	n/a
Votes cast / turnout	1,465,012	73.07	n/a
Abstentions	540,004	26.93	n/a
Registered voters	2,005,016		

=== Castilla–La Mancha ===
Summary of the 10 June 1987 European Parliament election results in Castilla–La Mancha →
Parties and alliances	Popular vote		
Parties and alliances	Votes	%	±pp
Spanish Socialist Workers' Party (PSOE)	418,182	44.66	n/a
People's Alliance (AP)	315,017	33.65	n/a
Democratic and Social Centre (CDS)	95,555	10.21	n/a
United Left (IU)	42,628	4.55	n/a
National Front (FN)	14,050	1.50	n/a
People's Democratic Party (PDP)	13,436	1.44	n/a
Workers' Party of Spain–Communist Unity (PTE–UC)	5,145	0.55	n/a
The Greens (LV)	3,263	0.35	n/a
Social Action (AS)	3,036	0.32	n/a
Workers' Socialist Party (PST)	2,784	0.30	n/a
Spanish Phalanx of the CNSO (FE–JONS)	1,814	0.19	n/a
Confederation of the Greens (CV)	1,693	0.18	n/a
Popular Unity (HB)	1,531	0.16	n/a
Left of the Peoples (IP)	1,508	0.16	n/a
Revolutionary Workers' Party of Spain (PORE)	935	0.10	n/a
Humanist Platform (PH–FV)	803	0.09	n/a
Internationalist Socialist Workers' Party (POSI)	708	0.08	n/a
Social Democratic Coalition (CSD)	632	0.07	n/a
Communist Unification of Spain (UCE)	570	0.06	n/a
National Assembly of Medicine Students and Associates (ANEMYA)	531	0.06	n/a
Regionalist Aragonese Party (PAR)	392	0.04	n/a
United Extremadura (EU)	375	0.04	n/a
Coalition for the Europe of the Peoples (EA–ERC–PNG)	304	0.03	n/a
Convergence and Union (CiU)	290	0.03	n/a
Valencian Union (UV)	285	0.03	n/a
Andalusian Party (PA)	284	0.03	n/a
Democratic Spanish Party (PED)	269	0.03	n/a
Nationalist Party of Castile and León (PANCAL)	268	0.03	n/a
Valencian Coalition Party (PCV)	235	0.03	n/a
Galician Nationalist Bloc (BNG)	194	0.02	n/a
Canarian Independent Groups (AIC)	193	0.02	n/a
Europeanist Union (PNV–PGN)	180	0.02	n/a
Andalusian Liberation (LA)	165	0.02	n/a
Blank ballots	9,040	0.97	n/a
Total	936,295		
Valid votes	936,295	98.82	n/a
Invalid votes	11,169	1.18	n/a
Votes cast / turnout	947,464	75.25	n/a
Abstentions	311,619	24.75	n/a
Registered voters	1,259,083		

=== Catalonia ===
Summary of the 10 June 1987 European Parliament election results in Catalonia →
Parties and alliances	Popular vote		
Parties and alliances	Votes	%	±pp
Socialists' Party of Catalonia (PSC–PSOE)	1,116,348	36.82	n/a
Convergence and Union (CiU)	843,322	27.82	n/a
People's Alliance (AP)	339,256	11.19	n/a
Democratic and Social Centre (CDS)	170,931	5.64	n/a
United Left–Initiative for Europe (IU–IE)	162,709	5.37	n/a
Republican Left of Catalonia (For the Europe of the Nations) (ERC)	112,107	3.70	n/a
Popular Unity (HB)	39,692	1.31	n/a
Left of the Peoples–Agreement of Left Nationalists (ENE)	24,914	0.82	n/a
Workers' Party of Spain–Communist Unity (PTE–UC)	24,429	0.81	n/a
Confederation of the Greens (CV)	23,356	0.77	n/a
The Greens (LV)	23,341	0.77	n/a
Workers' Socialist Party (PST)	19,241	0.63	n/a
Social Action (AS)	14,657	0.48	n/a
National Front (FN)	10,793	0.36	n/a
People's Democratic Party (PDP)	7,769	0.26	n/a
Internationalist Socialist Workers' Party (POSI)	7,371	0.24	n/a
Revolutionary Workers' Party of Spain (PORE)	6,948	0.23	n/a
Regionalist Aragonese Party (PAR)	6,259	0.21	n/a
Andalusian Party (PA)	5,578	0.18	n/a
Humanist Platform (PH–FV)	5,069	0.17	n/a
Social Democratic Coalition (CSD)	4,958	0.16	n/a
United Extremadura (EU)	4,857	0.16	n/a
Communist Unification of Spain (UCE)	4,642	0.15	n/a
National Assembly of Medicine Students and Associates (ANEMYA)	4,612	0.15	n/a
Europeanist Union (PNV–PGN)	3,402	0.11	n/a
Spanish Phalanx of the CNSO (FE–JONS)	2,802	0.09	n/a
Nationalist Party of Castile and León (PANCAL)	2,569	0.08	n/a
Democratic Spanish Party (PED)	2,446	0.08	n/a
Galician Nationalist Bloc (BNG)	2,152	0.07	n/a
Andalusian Liberation (LA)	2,081	0.07	n/a
Valencian Union (UV)	1,521	0.05	n/a
Canarian Independent Groups (AIC)	1,495	0.05	n/a
Valencian Coalition Party (PCV)	1,207	0.04	n/a
Blank ballots	28,751	0.95	n/a
Total	3,031,585		
Valid votes	3,031,585	99.14	n/a
Invalid votes	26,393	0.86	n/a
Votes cast / turnout	3,057,978	67.94	n/a
Abstentions	1,443,177	32.06	n/a
Registered voters	4,501,155		

=== Extremadura ===
Summary of the 10 June 1987 European Parliament election results in Extremadura →
Parties and alliances	Popular vote		
Parties and alliances	Votes	%	±pp
Spanish Socialist Workers' Party (PSOE)	296,914	49.94	n/a
People's Alliance (AP)	155,565	26.16	n/a
Democratic and Social Centre (CDS)	64,562	10.86	n/a
United Left (IU)	27,994	4.71	n/a
United Extremadura (EU)	20,458	3.44	n/a
People's Democratic Party (PDP)	3,815	0.64	n/a
Workers' Party of Spain–Communist Unity (PTE–UC)	3,674	0.62	n/a
National Front (FN)	2,099	0.35	n/a
Workers' Socialist Party (PST)	1,824	0.31	n/a
The Greens (LV)	1,724	0.29	n/a
Social Action (AS)	1,493	0.25	n/a
National Assembly of Medicine Students and Associates (ANEMYA)	1,257	0.21	n/a
Popular Unity (HB)	1,163	0.20	n/a
Revolutionary Workers' Party of Spain (PORE)	1,159	0.19	n/a
Confederation of the Greens (CV)	1,055	0.18	n/a
Spanish Phalanx of the CNSO (FE–JONS)	989	0.17	n/a
Left of the Peoples (IP)	826	0.14	n/a
Social Democratic Coalition (CSD)	504	0.08	n/a
Communist Unification of Spain (UCE)	463	0.08	n/a
Internationalist Socialist Workers' Party (POSI)	443	0.07	n/a
Humanist Platform (PH–FV)	389	0.07	n/a
Coalition for the Europe of the Peoples (EA–ERC–PNG)	215	0.04	n/a
Andalusian Party (PA)	212	0.04	n/a
Convergence and Union (CiU)	159	0.03	n/a
Galician Nationalist Bloc (BNG)	158	0.03	n/a
Valencian Coalition Party (PCV)	151	0.03	n/a
Valencian Union (UV)	142	0.02	n/a
Canarian Independent Groups (AIC)	136	0.02	n/a
Democratic Spanish Party (PED)	133	0.02	n/a
Europeanist Union (PNV–PGN)	129	0.02	n/a
Regionalist Aragonese Party (PAR)	122	0.02	n/a
Nationalist Party of Castile and León (PANCAL)	113	0.02	n/a
Andalusian Liberation (LA)	79	0.01	n/a
Blank ballots	4,468	0.75	n/a
Total	594,587		
Valid votes	594,587	99.02	n/a
Invalid votes	5,871	0.98	n/a
Votes cast / turnout	600,458	74.25	n/a
Abstentions	208,196	25.75	n/a
Registered voters	808,654		

=== Galicia ===
Summary of the 10 June 1987 European Parliament election results in Galicia →
Parties and alliances	Popular vote		
Parties and alliances	Votes	%	±pp
People's Alliance (AP)	513,744	41.71	n/a
Socialists' Party of Galicia (PSdG–PSOE)	364,747	29.61	n/a
Democratic and Social Centre (CDS)	126,203	10.25	n/a
Galician Nationalist Bloc (BNG)	45,525	3.70	n/a
Galician Socialist Party–Galician Left (Left of the Peoples) (PSG–EG)	36,062	2.93	n/a
People's Democratic Party (PDP)	22,666	1.84	n/a
United Left (IU)	15,696	1.27	n/a
Workers' Party of Spain–Communist Unity (PTE–UC)	13,091	1.06	n/a
Galician Nationalist Party (For the Europe of the Peoples) (PNG)	12,277	1.00	n/a
Social Action (AS)	11,663	0.95	n/a
Workers' Socialist Party (PST)	8,854	0.72	n/a
Popular Unity (HB)	7,242	0.59	n/a
Nationalist Galicianist Party (Europeanist Union) (PGN)	5,322	0.43	n/a
The Greens (LV)	3,841	0.31	n/a
Internationalist Socialist Workers' Party (POSI)	3,055	0.25	n/a
National Assembly of Medicine Students and Associates (ANEMYA)	2,991	0.24	n/a
Social Democratic Coalition (CSD)	2,930	0.24	n/a
Confederation of the Greens (CV)	2,912	0.24	n/a
National Front (FN)	2,812	0.23	n/a
Communist Unification of Spain (UCE)	2,055	0.17	n/a
Humanist Platform (PH–FV)	1,838	0.15	n/a
Revolutionary Workers' Party of Spain (PORE)	1,723	0.14	n/a
Spanish Phalanx of the CNSO (FE–JONS)	1,452	0.12	n/a
Canarian Independent Groups (AIC)	1,064	0.09	n/a
Democratic Spanish Party (PED)	1,035	0.08	n/a
Convergence and Union (CiU)	992	0.08	n/a
United Extremadura (EU)	977	0.08	n/a
Valencian Coalition Party (PCV)	832	0.03	n/a
Valencian Union (UV)	807	0.07	n/a
Regionalist Aragonese Party (PAR)	784	0.06	n/a
Nationalist Party of Castile and León (PANCAL)	705	0.06	n/a
Andalusian Party (PA)	674	0.05	n/a
Andalusian Liberation (LA)	631	0.05	n/a
Blank ballots	14,492	1.18	n/a
Total	1,231,694		
Valid votes	1,231,694	98.71	n/a
Invalid votes	16,125	1.29	n/a
Votes cast / turnout	1,247,819	57.12	n/a
Abstentions	936,614	42.88	n/a
Registered voters	2,184,433		

=== La Rioja ===
Summary of the 10 June 1987 European Parliament election results in La Rioja →
Parties and alliances	Popular vote		
Parties and alliances	Votes	%	±pp
Spanish Socialist Workers' Party (PSOE)	57,439	39.96	n/a
People's Alliance (AP)	53,621	37.30	n/a
Democratic and Social Centre (CDS)	15,183	10.56	n/a
People's Democratic Party (PDP)	3,336	2.32	n/a
United Left (IU)	2,457	1.71	n/a
Social Action (AS)	1,486	1.03	n/a
Workers' Party of Spain–Communist Unity (PTE–UC)	1,406	0.98	n/a
Popular Unity (HB)	1,064	0.74	n/a
National Front (FN)	916	0.64	n/a
Left of the Peoples (IP)	744	0.52	n/a
Workers' Socialist Party (PST)	744	0.52	n/a
The Greens (LV)	654	0.45	n/a
Confederation of the Greens (CV)	436	0.30	n/a
Internationalist Socialist Workers' Party (POSI)	323	0.22	n/a
Social Democratic Coalition (CSD)	215	0.15	n/a
Coalition for the Europe of the Peoples (EA–ERC–PNG)	189	0.13	n/a
Spanish Phalanx of the CNSO (FE–JONS)	165	0.11	n/a
National Assembly of Medicine Students and Associates (ANEMYA)	155	0.11	n/a
Regionalist Aragonese Party (PAR)	146	0.10	n/a
Communist Unification of Spain (UCE)	142	0.10	n/a
Revolutionary Workers' Party of Spain (PORE)	118	0.08	n/a
Europeanist Union (PNV–PGN)	115	0.08	n/a
Humanist Platform (PH–FV)	87	0.06	n/a
Nationalist Party of Castile and León (PANCAL)	78	0.05	n/a
Convergence and Union (CiU)	71	0.05	n/a
Democratic Spanish Party (PED)	64	0.04	n/a
United Extremadura (EU)	61	0.04	n/a
Canarian Independent Groups (AIC)	60	0.04	n/a
Valencian Coalition Party (PCV)	53	0.04	n/a
Valencian Union (UV)	46	0.03	n/a
Andalusian Party (PA)	42	0.03	n/a
Galician Nationalist Bloc (BNG)	40	0.03	n/a
Andalusian Liberation (LA)	24	0.02	n/a
Blank ballots	2,060	1.43	n/a
Total	143,740		
Valid votes	143,740	98.64	n/a
Invalid votes	1,983	1.36	n/a
Votes cast / turnout	145,723	72.23	n/a
Abstentions	56,015	27.77	n/a
Registered voters	201,738		

=== Madrid ===
Summary of the 10 June 1987 European Parliament election results in Madrid →
Parties and alliances	Popular vote		
Parties and alliances	Votes	%	±pp
Spanish Socialist Workers' Party (PSOE)	979,143	40.38	n/a
People's Alliance (AP)	735,200	30.32	n/a
Democratic and Social Centre (CDS)	339,476	14.00	n/a
United Left (IU)	124,843	5.15	n/a
Workers' Party of Spain–Communist Unity (PTE–UC)	53,515	2.21	n/a
National Front (FN)	29,201	1.20	n/a
Left of the Peoples (IP)	20,558	0.85	n/a
The Greens (LV)	18,551	0.77	n/a
Social Action (AS)	15,296	0.63	n/a
Popular Unity (HB)	14,626	0.60	n/a
People's Democratic Party (PDP)	13,222	0.55	n/a
Confederation of the Greens (CV)	9,150	0.38	n/a
Workers' Socialist Party (PST)	6,526	0.27	n/a
National Assembly of Medicine Students and Associates (ANEMYA)	4,368	0.18	n/a
Humanist Platform (PH–FV)	4,044	0.17	n/a
Spanish Phalanx of the CNSO (FE–JONS)	4,034	0.17	n/a
United Extremadura (EU)	3,791	0.16	n/a
Revolutionary Workers' Party of Spain (PORE)	2,847	0.12	n/a
Social Democratic Coalition (CSD)	2,264	0.09	n/a
Coalition for the Europe of the Peoples (EA–ERC–PNG)	2,227	0.09	n/a
Europeanist Union (PNV–PGN)	1,913	0.08	n/a
Communist Unification of Spain (UCE)	1,869	0.08	n/a
Regionalist Aragonese Party (PAR)	1,716	0.07	n/a
Andalusian Party (PA)	1,688	0.07	n/a
Internationalist Socialist Workers' Party (POSI)	1,561	0.06	n/a
Convergence and Union (CiU)	1,418	0.06	n/a
Nationalist Party of Castile and León (PANCAL)	1,185	0.05	n/a
Democratic Spanish Party (PED)	963	0.04	n/a
Galician Nationalist Bloc (BNG)	947	0.04	n/a
Canarian Independent Groups (AIC)	925	0.04	n/a
Valencian Union (UV)	643	0.03	n/a
Valencian Coalition Party (PCV)	561	0.02	n/a
Andalusian Liberation (LA)	550	0.02	n/a
Blank ballots	25,960	1.07	n/a
Total	2,424,781		
Valid votes	2,424,781	98.62	n/a
Invalid votes	33,952	1.38	n/a
Votes cast / turnout	2,458,733	69.93	n/a
Abstentions	1,057,114	30.07	n/a
Registered voters	3,515,847		

=== Murcia ===
Summary of the 10 June 1987 European Parliament election results in Murcia →
Parties and alliances	Popular vote		
Parties and alliances	Votes	%	±pp
Spanish Socialist Workers' Party (PSOE)	229,984	45.41	n/a
People's Alliance (AP)	163,963	32.38	n/a
Democratic and Social Centre (CDS)	57,106	11.28	n/a
United Left (IU)	28,199	5.57	n/a
People's Democratic Party (PDP)	3,232	0.64	n/a
National Front (FN)	3,227	0.64	n/a
Social Action (AS)	2,633	0.52	n/a
Workers' Party of Spain–Communist Unity (PTE–UC)	1,889	0.37	n/a
The Greens (LV)	1,882	0.37	n/a
Popular Unity (HB)	1,309	0.26	n/a
Workers' Socialist Party (PST)	1,074	0.21	n/a
Left of the Peoples (IP)	1,034	0.20	n/a
Confederation of the Greens (CV)	939	0.19	n/a
Social Democratic Coalition (CSD)	577	0.11	n/a
Spanish Phalanx of the CNSO (FE–JONS)	566	0.11	n/a
Revolutionary Workers' Party of Spain (PORE)	546	0.11	n/a
Humanist Platform (PH–FV)	532	0.11	n/a
Communist Unification of Spain (UCE)	501	0.10	n/a
Internationalist Socialist Workers' Party (POSI)	414	0.08	n/a
Valencian Union (UV)	308	0.06	n/a
Coalition for the Europe of the Peoples (EA–ERC–PNG)	265	0.05	n/a
National Assembly of Medicine Students and Associates (ANEMYA)	264	0.05	n/a
Valencian Coalition Party (PCV)	209	0.04	n/a
Convergence and Union (CiU)	205	0.04	n/a
Democratic Spanish Party (PED)	196	0.04	n/a
Regionalist Aragonese Party (PAR)	184	0.04	n/a
Canarian Independent Groups (AIC)	170	0.03	n/a
United Extremadura (EU)	168	0.03	n/a
Andalusian Party (PA)	151	0.03	n/a
Andalusian Liberation (LA)	150	0.03	n/a
Europeanist Union (PNV–PGN)	148	0.03	n/a
Galician Nationalist Bloc (BNG)	119	0.02	n/a
Nationalist Party of Castile and León (PANCAL)	118	0.02	n/a
Blank ballots	4,178	0.82	n/a
Total	506,440		
Valid votes	506,440	98.79	n/a
Invalid votes	6,181	1.21	n/a
Votes cast / turnout	512,621	72.05	n/a
Abstentions	198,843	27.95	n/a
Registered voters	711,464		

=== Navarre ===
Summary of the 10 June 1987 European Parliament election results in Navarre →
Parties and alliances	Popular vote		
Parties and alliances	Votes	%	±pp
Spanish Socialist Workers' Party (PSOE)	83,111	29.49	n/a
People's Alliance (AP)	72,755	25.82	n/a
Popular Unity (HB)	40,523	14.38	n/a
Democratic and Social Centre (CDS)	27,540	9.77	n/a
Basque Solidarity (Europe of the Peoples) (EA)	18,991	6.74	n/a
Basque Country Left (Left of the Peoples) (EE)	9,453	3.35	n/a
People's Democratic Party (PDP)	7,906	2.81	n/a
United Left (IU)	3,836	1.36	n/a
Basque Nationalist Party (Europeanist Union) (EAJ/PNV)	2,574	0.91	n/a
The Greens (LV)	1,364	0.48	n/a
National Front (FN)	1,215	0.43	n/a
Workers' Party of Spain–Communist Unity (PTE–UC)	1,131	0.40	n/a
Workers' Socialist Party (PST)	1,117	0.40	n/a
Social Action (AS)	972	0.34	n/a
Confederation of the Greens (CV)	860	0.31	n/a
Social Democratic Coalition (CSD)	643	0.23	n/a
Internationalist Socialist Workers' Party (POSI)	402	0.14	n/a
Regionalist Aragonese Party (PAR)	340	0.12	n/a
National Assembly of Medicine Students and Associates (ANEMYA)	330	0.12	n/a
Revolutionary Workers' Party of Spain (PORE)	291	0.10	n/a
Communist Unification of Spain (UCE)	268	0.10	n/a
Spanish Phalanx of the CNSO (FE–JONS)	218	0.08	n/a
Humanist Platform (PH–FV)	207	0.07	n/a
Convergence and Union (CiU)	181	0.06	n/a
Democratic Spanish Party (PED)	155	0.05	n/a
United Extremadura (EU)	144	0.05	n/a
Andalusian Party (PA)	127	0.05	n/a
Nationalist Party of Castile and León (PANCAL)	105	0.04	n/a
Galician Nationalist Bloc (BNG)	104	0.04	n/a
Canarian Independent Groups (AIC)	97	0.03	n/a
Andalusian Liberation (LA)	85	0.03	n/a
Valencian Union (UV)	75	0.03	n/a
Valencian Coalition Party (PCV)	56	0.02	n/a
Blank ballots	4,655	1.65	n/a
Total	281,831		
Valid votes	281,831	98.75	n/a
Invalid votes	3,575	1.25	n/a
Votes cast / turnout	285,406	72.56	n/a
Abstentions	107,920	27.44	n/a
Registered voters	393,326		

=== Valencian Community ===
Summary of the 10 June 1987 European Parliament election results in the Valencian Community →
Parties and alliances	Popular vote		
Parties and alliances	Votes	%	±pp
Spanish Socialist Workers' Party (PSOE)	845,517	42.08	n/a
People's Alliance (AP)	490,434	24.41	n/a
Democratic and Social Centre (CDS)	210,242	10.46	n/a
Valencian Union (UV)	155,678	7.75	n/a
United Left (IU)	99,434	4.95	n/a
Workers' Party of Spain–Communist Unity (PTE–UC)	30,719	1.53	n/a
Left of the Peoples (IP)	24,985	1.24	n/a
The Greens (LV)	19,584	0.97	n/a
People's Democratic Party (PDP)	18,390	0.92	n/a
National Front (FN)	16,861	0.84	n/a
Popular Unity (HB)	12,247	0.61	n/a
Social Action (AS)	10,107	0.50	n/a
Valencian Coalition Party (PCV)	8,961	0.45	n/a
Confederation of the Greens (CV)	8,402	0.42	n/a
Workers' Socialist Party (PST)	7,786	0.39	n/a
Revolutionary Workers' Party of Spain (PORE)	4,022	0.20	n/a
Spanish Phalanx of the CNSO (FE–JONS)	2,992	0.15	n/a
Communist Unification of Spain (UCE)	2,820	0.14	n/a
Coalition for the Europe of the Peoples (EA–ERC–PNG)	2,726	0.14	n/a
Convergence and Union (CiU)	2,256	0.11	n/a
National Assembly of Medicine Students and Associates (ANEMYA)	2,236	0.11	n/a
Social Democratic Coalition (CSD)	2,158	0.11	n/a
Internationalist Socialist Workers' Party (POSI)	2,058	0.10	n/a
Humanist Platform (PH–FV)	1,990	0.10	n/a
United Extremadura (EU)	1,879	0.09	n/a
Regionalist Aragonese Party (PAR)	1,597	0.08	n/a
Canarian Independent Groups (AIC)	1,252	0.06	n/a
Andalusian Liberation (LA)	1,232	0.06	n/a
Andalusian Party (PA)	1,159	0.06	n/a
Europeanist Union (PNV–PGN)	1,135	0.06	n/a
Galician Nationalist Bloc (BNG)	733	0.04	n/a
Democratic Spanish Party (PED)	731	0.04	n/a
Nationalist Party of Castile and León (PANCAL)	603	0.03	n/a
Blank ballots	16,515	0.82	n/a
Total	2,009,441		
Valid votes	2,009,441	98.94	n/a
Invalid votes	21,594	1.06	n/a
Votes cast / turnout	2,031,035	74.46	n/a
Abstentions	696,809	25.54	n/a
Registered voters	2,727,844		

== Autonomous cities ==
=== Ceuta ===
Summary of the 10 June 1987 European Parliament election results in Ceuta →
Parties and alliances	Popular vote		
Parties and alliances	Votes	%	±pp
Spanish Socialist Workers' Party (PSOE)	9,034	44.86	n/a
People's Alliance (AP)	6,771	33.63	n/a
Democratic and Social Centre (CDS)	2,191	10.88	n/a
People's Democratic Party (PDP)	268	1.33	n/a
The Greens (LV)	212	1.05	n/a
Social Action (AS)	199	0.99	n/a
United Left (IU)	180	0.89	n/a
National Front (FN)	144	0.72	n/a
Confederation of the Greens (CV)	115	0.57	n/a
Workers' Party of Spain–Communist Unity (PTE–UC)	70	0.35	n/a
Andalusian Party (PA)	66	0.33	n/a
Workers' Socialist Party (PST)	65	0.32	n/a
Internationalist Socialist Workers' Party (POSI)	45	0.22	n/a
Social Democratic Coalition (CSD)	44	0.22	n/a
Spanish Phalanx of the CNSO (FE–JONS)	40	0.20	n/a
Canarian Independent Groups (AIC)	32	0.16	n/a
Andalusian Liberation (LA)	31	0.15	n/a
Popular Unity (HB)	30	0.15	n/a
Humanist Platform (PH–FV)	26	0.13	n/a
Left of the Peoples (IP)	25	0.12	n/a
Convergence and Union (CiU)	24	0.12	n/a
Valencian Union (UV)	23	0.11	n/a
Regionalist Aragonese Party (PAR)	23	0.11	n/a
Communist Unification of Spain (UCE)	22	0.11	n/a
United Extremadura (EU)	21	0.10	n/a
National Assembly of Medicine Students and Associates (ANEMYA)	20	0.10	n/a
Coalition for the Europe of the Peoples (EA–ERC–PNG)	17	0.08	n/a
Democratic Spanish Party (PED)	15	0.07	n/a
Europeanist Union (PNV–PGN)	14	0.07	n/a
Valencian Coalition Party (PCV)	14	0.07	n/a
Revolutionary Workers' Party of Spain (PORE)	12	0.06	n/a
Galician Nationalist Bloc (BNG)	11	0.05	n/a
Nationalist Party of Castile and León (PANCAL)	6	0.03	n/a
Blank ballots	326	1.62	n/a
Total	20,136		
Valid votes	20,136	98.14	n/a
Invalid votes	382	1.86	n/a
Votes cast / turnout	20,518	55.04	n/a
Abstentions	16,762	44.96	n/a
Registered voters	37,280		

=== Melilla ===
Summary of the 10 June 1987 European Parliament election results in Melilla →
Parties and alliances	Popular vote		
Parties and alliances	Votes	%	±pp
Spanish Socialist Workers' Party (PSOE)	8,581	45.87	n/a
People's Alliance (AP)	6,778	36.23	n/a
Democratic and Social Centre (CDS)	1,569	8.39	n/a
People's Democratic Party (PDP)	758	4.05	n/a
United Left (IU)	183	0.98	n/a
National Front (FN)	97	0.52	n/a
Social Action (AS)	65	0.35	n/a
The Greens (LV)	64	0.34	n/a
Workers' Socialist Party (PST)	63	0.34	n/a
Workers' Party of Spain–Communist Unity (PTE–UC)	48	0.26	n/a
Left of the Peoples (IP)	44	0.24	n/a
Confederation of the Greens (CV)	38	0.20	n/a
Andalusian Party (PA)	36	0.19	n/a
Andalusian Liberation (LA)	29	0.16	n/a
Popular Unity (HB)	26	0.14	n/a
Regionalist Aragonese Party (PAR)	16	0.09	n/a
Canarian Independent Groups (AIC)	15	0.08	n/a
Spanish Phalanx of the CNSO (FE–JONS)	12	0.06	n/a
Social Democratic Coalition (CSD)	12	0.06	n/a
Convergence and Union (CiU)	11	0.06	n/a
National Assembly of Medicine Students and Associates (ANEMYA)	11	0.06	n/a
Communist Unification of Spain (UCE)	10	0.05	n/a
Humanist Platform (PH–FV)	10	0.05	n/a
Revolutionary Workers' Party of Spain (PORE)	10	0.05	n/a
Internationalist Socialist Workers' Party (POSI)	8	0.04	n/a
Europeanist Union (PNV–PGN)	8	0.04	n/a
Democratic Spanish Party (PED)	7	0.04	n/a
United Extremadura (EU)	7	0.04	n/a
Nationalist Party of Castile and León (PANCAL)	7	0.04	n/a
Galician Nationalist Bloc (BNG)	6	0.03	n/a
Valencian Union (UV)	5	0.03	n/a
Valencian Coalition Party (PCV)	5	0.03	n/a
Coalition for the Europe of the Peoples (EA–ERC–PNG)	4	0.02	n/a
Blank ballots	165	0.88	n/a
Total	18,708		
Valid votes	18,708	98.56	n/a
Invalid votes	273	1.44	n/a
Votes cast / turnout	18,981	62.64	n/a
Abstentions	11,322	37.36	n/a
Registered voters	30,303		

== Congress of Deputies projection ==
A projection of European Parliament election results using electoral rules for the Congress of Deputies would have given the following seat allocation, as distributed per constituencies and regions: (Note: Note that results are compared with party totals in the preceding general election—held in June 1986—for consistency.)

Summary of the 10 June 1987 Congress of Deputies projected election results
Parties and alliances	Popular vote			Seats	
Parties and alliances	Votes	%	±pp	Total	+/−
Spanish Socialist Workers' Party (PSOE)	7,522,706	39.06	−5.00	169	−15
People's Alliance (AP)^{1}	4,747,283	24.65	−1.32	108	+3
Democratic and Social Centre (CDS)	1,976,093	10.26	+1.04	23	+4
United Left (IU)	1,011,830	5.25	+0.62	9	+2
Convergence and Union (CiU)	843,322	4.38	−0.64	16	−2
Popular Unity (HB)	250,953	1.30	+0.15	6	+1
Basque Nationalist Party (EAJ/PNV)	210,709	1.09	−0.44	5	−1
Basque Solidarity (EA)	191,402	0.99	New	4	+4
Andalusian Party (PA)	173,002	0.90	+0.43	2	+2
Valencian Union (UV)	155,678	0.81	+0.39	2	+1
Basque Country Left (EE)	113,768	0.59	+0.06	2	±0
Republican Left of Catalonia (ERC)	112,640	0.58	+0.16	1	+1
Regionalist Aragonese Party (PAR)	91,111	0.47	+0.11	1	±0
Canarian Independent Groups (AIC)	89,083	0.46	+0.13	2	+1
Galician Coalition (CG)	n/a	n/a	−0.40	0	−1
Others	1,581,917	8.21	—	0	±0
Blank ballots	189,729	0.99	+0.39		
Total	19,261,226			350	±0
Sources
Footnotes: ^{1} People's Alliance results are compared to People's Coalition totals in the 1986 election.

=== Constituencies ===

Summary of constituency results in the 10 June 1987 European Parliament election in Spain
Constituency	PSOE		AP		CDS		IU		CiU		HB		PNV		EA		PA		UV		EE		ERC		PAR		AIC	
Constituency	%	S	%	S	%	S	%	S	%	S	%	S	%	S	%	S	%	S	%	S	%	S	%	S	%	S	%	S
La Coruña	31.5	4	36.0	4	11.1	1	1.7	−																				
Álava	21.9	1	11.8	−	7.8	−	0.6	−			14.6	1	13.5	1	15.7	1					8.8	−						
Albacete	46.9	3	30.9	1	10.3	−	5.7	−																				
Alicante	43.5	6	28.3	3	12.9	1	5.0	−											0.5	−								
Almería	48.9	4	23.8	1	12.0	−	6.4	−									2.3	−										
Asturias	42.4	4	25.9	3	14.5	1	9.8	1																				
Ávila	25.0	1	32.2	1	36.1	1	1.9	−																				
Badajoz	51.8	4	24.7	2	11.4	−	6.1	−																				
Balearics	34.2	3	35.9	3	11.9	1	2.2	−															0.2	−				
Barcelona	38.8	14	10.9	4	5.8	2	6.1	2	25.2	9													3.5	1				
Biscay	19.5	2	7.1	1	4.0	−	1.3	−			18.0	2	24.8	3	12.0	1					9.0	1						
Burgos	34.1	2	37.3	2	15.5	−	2.7	−																				
Cáceres	47.1	3	28.4	2	10.1	−	2.5	−																				
Cádiz	47.2	5	15.9	2	6.9	−	8.6	1									12.6	1										
Cantabria	36.3	3	36.2	2	9.9	−	3.4	−																				
Castellón	41.5	3	30.3	2	10.2	−	2.7	−											3.5	−								
Ceuta	44.9	1	33.6	−	10.9	−	0.9	−																				
Ciudad Real	49.1	3	29.5	2	10.3	−	4.3	−																				
Córdoba	43.7	4	20.3	2	9.2	−	16.9	1									4.2	−										
Cuenca	42.1	2	37.4	1	8.9	−	2.3	−																				
Gipuzkoa	17.3	1	5.5	−	2.2	−	0.6	−			24.2	2	12.7	1	22.9	2					11.3	1						
Gerona	29.4	2	8.5	−	3.8	−	2.8	−	41.1	3													5.0	−				
Granada	45.7	5	25.8	2	7.8	−	8.5	−									3.7	−										
Guadalajara	36.6	1	40.7	2	10.1	−	4.0	−																				
Huelva	54.1	4	20.8	1	6.5	−	7.4	−									4.7	−										
Huesca	38.1	2	23.0	1	13.3	−	3.9	−																	13.7	−		
Jaén	48.8	4	27.3	2	6.8	−	10.9	−									1.8	−										
La Rioja	40.0	2	37.3	2	10.6	−	1.7	−																				
Las Palmas	31.1	3	18.9	2	25.9	2	5.4	−																			2.8	−
León	40.1	3	36.5	2	12.4	−	2.8	−																				
Lérida	27.5	1	14.2	1	5.6	−	2.1	−	37.9	2													4.5	−				
Lugo	21.9	1	52.6	4	9.1	−	0.8	−																				
Madrid	40.4	15	30.3	12	14.0	5	5.1	1																				
Málaga	49.2	5	20.3	2	8.7	1	10.7	1									4.5	−										
Melilla	45.9	1	36.2	−	8.4	−	1.0	−																				
Murcia	45.4	4	32.4	3	11.3	1	5.6	−																				
Navarre	29.5	2	25.8	2	9.8	−	1.4	−			14.4	1	0.9	−	6.7	−					3.4	−						
Orense	30.2	2	46.3	3	8.7	−	0.9	−																				
Palencia	34.9	1	42.6	2	12.9	−	3.0	−																				
Pontevedra	30.8	3	41.6	4	10.4	1	1.2	−																				
Salamanca	35.6	1	36.5	2	18.4	1	2.2	−																				
Santa Cruz de Tenerife	34.6	3	14.9	1	14.1	1	3.3	−																			28.4	2
Segovia	29.8	1	28.9	1	23.3	1	2.5	−																				
Seville	50.1	7	19.7	3	4.2	−	12.2	1									7.0	1										
Soria	32.9	1	43.1	2	12.3	−	1.6	−																				
Tarragona	32.7	2	14.2	1	5.7	−	3.7	−	30.9	2													3.9	−				
Teruel	36.0	2	33.5	1	10.0	−	1.3	−																	11.6	−		
Toledo	42.9	3	35.3	2	10.7	−	5.3	−																				
Valencia	41.5	8	21.0	4	9.2	1	5.4	1											12.5	2								
Valladolid	37.1	2	32.0	2	17.6	1	3.1	−																				
Zamora	33.9	2	42.8	2	15.1	−	1.5	−																				
Zaragoza	38.9	3	23.2	2	11.1	1	3.7	−																	14.9	1		
Total	39.1	169	24.6	108	10.3	23	5.3	9	4.4	16	1.3	6	1.1	5	1.0	4	0.9	2	0.8	2	0.6	2	0.6	1	0.5	1	0.5	2

=== Regions ===

Summary of regional results in the 10 June 1987 European Parliament election in Spain
Region	PSOE		AP		CDS		IU		CiU		HB		PNV		EA		PA		UV		EE		ERC		PAR		AIC	
Region	%	S	%	S	%	S	%	S	%	S	%	S	%	S	%	S	%	S	%	S	%	S	%	S	%	S	%	S
Andalusia	48.3	38	21.3	15	7.2	1	10.8	4									5.6	2										
Aragon	38.4	7	24.5	4	11.4	1	3.4	−																	14.3	1		
Asturias	42.4	4	25.9	3	14.5	1	9.8	1																				
Balearics	34.2	3	35.9	3	11.9	1	2.2	−															0.2	−				
Basque Country	19.1	4	7.2	1	3.9	−	1.0	−			19.6	5	19.4	5	16.1	4					9.7	2						
Canary Islands	32.7	6	17.1	3	20.5	3	4.5	−																			14.5	2
Cantabria	36.3	3	36.2	2	9.9	−	3.4	−																				
Castile and León	35.1	14	36.2	16	17.3	4	2.5	−																				
Castilla–La Mancha	44.7	12	33.6	8	10.2	−	4.6	−																				
Catalonia	36.8	19	11.2	6	5.6	2	5.4	2	27.8	16													3.7	1				
Ceuta	44.9	1	33.6	−	10.9	−	0.9	−																				
Extremadura	49.9	7	26.2	4	10.9	−	4.7	−																				
Galicia	29.6	10	41.7	15	10.2	2	1.3	−																				
La Rioja	40.0	2	37.3	2	10.6	−	1.7	−																				
Madrid	40.4	15	30.3	12	14.0	5	5.1	1																				
Melilla	45.9	1	36.2	−	8.4	−	1.0	−																				
Murcia	45.4	4	32.4	3	11.3	1	5.6	−																				
Navarre	29.5	2	25.8	2	9.8	−	1.4	−			14.4	1	0.9	−	6.7	−					3.4	−						
Valencian Community	42.1	17	24.4	9	10.5	2	4.9	1											7.7	2								
Total	39.1	169	24.6	108	10.3	23	5.3	9	4.4	16	1.3	6	1.1	5	1.0	4	0.9	2	0.8	2	0.6	2	0.6	1	0.5	1	0.5	2
