= 1983 Riojan regional election =

Election in the Spanish region of La Rioja

- 8 May 1983

All 35 seats in the General Deputation of La Rioja 18 seats needed for a majority
- Opinion polls
- Registered: 194,994
- Turnout: 136,964 (70.2%)

	First party	Second party	Third party
Leader	José María de Miguel	Joaquín Espert	Luis J. Rodríguez Moroy
Party	PSOE	AP–PDP–PL	PR+
Leader since	5 March 1983	1983	6 December 1982
Seats won	18	15	2
Popular vote	63,848	54,121	10,102
Percentage	47.2%	40.0%	7.5%
President before election
Antonio Rodríguez Basulto
PSOE
Elected President
José María de Miguel
PSOE

The 1983 Riojan regional election was held on 8 May 1983 to elect the 1st General Deputation of the autonomous community of La Rioja. All 35 seats in the General Deputation were up for election. It was held concurrently with regional elections in twelve other autonomous communities and local elections all throughout Spain.

La Rioja became an autonomous community in July 1982 after the coming into force of its Statute of Autonomy. Previous to the 1982 Spanish general election the new regional government was controlled by the Democratic and Social Centre (CDS) after most of its members had split up from the Union of the Democratic Centre (UCD). After losing their parliamentary seats as a result of the general election, many members including the regional president Luis Javier Rodríguez Moroy were forced to stand down over compatibility issues. Failure in negotiations for electing Rodríguez Moroy's successor until the 1983 local and regional elections delayed a new appointment until January 1983, when an agreement between the Spanish Socialist Workers' Party (PSOE) and Rodríguez Moroy's newly created Progressive Riojan Party (PRP) resulted in PSOE's Antonio Rodríguez Basulto being provisionally elected to the post.

The PSOE secured an absolute majority of seats in the regional election, allowing their candidate José María de Miguel to be elected as president of a majority government, the only time to date in which the party has achieved this in a Riojan regional election. The People's Coalition, an electoral alliance led by the People's Alliance (AP) and including the People's Democratic Party (PDP) and the Liberal Union (UL) emerged as the second largest grouping in the General Deputation, while the PRP came third by securing 7.5% of the share and two seats. Neither the Communist Party of Spain (PCE) nor the Democratic and Social Centre (CDS), the only other parties standing in the election, were able to meet the electoral threshold for securing parliamentary representation.

== Overview ==
=== Electoral system ===
The General Deputation of La Rioja was the devolved, unicameral legislature of the autonomous community of La Rioja, having legislative power in regional matters as defined by the Spanish Constitution and the Riojan Statute of Autonomy, as well as the ability to vote confidence in or withdraw it from a regional president.

Transitory Provision Fifth of the Statute established a specific electoral procedure for the first election to the General Deputation of La Rioja, to be supplemented by the provisions within Royal Decree-Law 20/1977, of 18 March, and its related regulations. Voting for the General Deputation was on the basis of universal suffrage, which comprised all nationals over 18 years of age, registered in La Rioja and in full enjoyment of their political rights. The 35 members of the General Deputation of La Rioja were elected using the D'Hondt method and a closed list proportional representation, with an electoral threshold of five percent of valid votes—which included blank ballots—being applied regionally.

=== Election date ===
The Provisional Deputation of La Rioja, in agreement with the Government of Spain, was required to call an election to the General Deputation of La Rioja within from 1 February to 31 May 1983. In the event of an investiture process failing to elect a regional President within a two-month period from the first ballot, the General Deputation was to be automatically dissolved and a snap election called, with elected lawmakers serving the remainder of its original four-year term.

== Parliamentary composition ==
The first election to the General Deputation of La Rioja was officially called on 10 March 1983, after the publication of the election decree in the Official State Gazette, with the mandate of the provisional Deputation ending on 8 May. The table below shows the composition of the parliamentary groups in the Provisional Deputation at the time of its expiry.

Parliamentary composition in May 1983
Groups	Parties	Legislators	
Groups	Parties	Seats	Total
Progressive Parliamentary Group	PRP	10	10
People's Parliamentary Group	AP	8	8
Socialist Parliamentary Group	PSOE	8	8
Centrist Parliamentary Group	UCD	6	6

== Parties and candidates ==
The electoral law allowed for parties and federations registered in the interior ministry, coalitions and groupings of electors to present lists of candidates. Parties and federations intending to form a coalition ahead of an election were required to inform the relevant Electoral Commission within fifteen days of the election call, whereas groupings of electors needed to secure the signature of at least one-thousandth of the electorate in the constituencies for which they sought election—with a compulsory minimum of 500 signatures—disallowing electors from signing for more than one list of candidates.

Below is a list of the main parties and electoral alliances which contested the election:

Candidacy	Parties and alliances	Leading candidate	Ideology	Gov.	Ref.
PSOE	List: Spanish Socialist Workers' Party (PSOE)	José María de Miguel	Social democracy	Yes	
AP–PDP–UL	List: People's Alliance (AP); People's Democratic Party (PDP); Liberal Union (UL)	Joaquín Espert	Conservatism; Christian democracy	No	
PRP	List: Progressive Riojan Party (PRP)	Luis Javier Rodríguez Moroy	Regionalism; Progressivism	No	

== Opinion polls ==
The table below lists voting intention estimates in reverse chronological order, showing the most recent first and using the dates when the survey fieldwork was done, as opposed to the date of publication. Where the fieldwork dates are unknown, the date of publication is given instead. The highest percentage figure in each polling survey is displayed with its background shaded in the leading party's colour. If a tie ensues, this is applied to the figures with the highest percentages. The "Lead" column on the right shows the percentage-point difference between the parties with the highest percentages in a poll. When available, seat projections determined by the polling organisations are displayed below (or in place of) the percentages in a smaller font; 18 seats were required for an absolute majority in the General Deputation of La Rioja.

Polling firm/Commissioner	Fieldwork date	Sample size	Turnout	PSOE	AP–PDP–UL	UCD	CDS	PCE	PRP	Lead
1983 municipal election	8 May 1983	—N/a	70.2	47.2; 18	40.0; 15	–	2.4; 0	2.2; 0	7.5; 2	7.2
Sofemasa/El País	23–26 Apr 1983	?	?	? 20/22	? 12/14	–	–	–	–	?
ICSA–Gallup/El Correo	22 Apr 1983	?	?	45.2	42.0	–	3,1	1.7	5.1	3.2
1982 general election	28 Oct 1982	—N/a	84.1	43.5 (17)	41.5 (16)	7.4 (2)	3.7 (0)	1.6 (0)	–	2.0

== Results ==
Summary of the 8 May 1983 General Deputation of La Rioja election results →
Parties and alliances	Popular vote			Seats	
Parties and alliances	Votes	%	±pp	Total	+/−
Spanish Socialist Workers' Party (PSOE)	63,848	47.17	n/a	18	n/a
People's Coalition (AP–PDP–UL)	54,121	39.98	n/a	15	n/a
Progressive Riojan Party (PRP)	10,102	7.46	n/a	2	n/a
Democratic and Social Centre (CDS)	3,264	2.41	n/a	0	n/a
Communist Party of Spain (PCE)	2,934	2.17	n/a	0	n/a
Blank ballots	1,090	0.81	n/a		
Total	135,359			35	n/a
Valid votes	135,359	98.83	n/a		
Invalid votes	1,605	1.17	n/a		
Votes cast / turnout	136,964	70.24	n/a		
Abstentions	58,030	29.76	n/a		
Registered voters	194,994				

Popular vote
PSOE	47.17%
AP–PDP–UL	39.98%
PRP	7.46%
CDS	2.41%
PCE	2.17%
Blank ballots	0.81%

Seats
PSOE	51.43%
AP–PDP–UL	42.86%
PRP	5.71%

== Aftermath ==
Investiture; José María de Miguel (PSOE)
Ballot →	28 May 1983
Required majority →	18 out of 35
Yes: • PSOE (18)	18 / 35
No: • AP–PDP–UL (15)	15 / 35
Abstentions: • PRP (2)	2 / 35
Absentees	0 / 35
