= Francisco Díaz Yubero =

Spanish politician (1943–2024)

Member of the Parliament of La Rioja
- In office 23 May 1983 – 14 April 1987

Personal details
- Born: 10 April 1943 Madrid, Spain
- Died: 28 June 2024 (aged 81)
- Party: PRP
- Education: Technical University of Valencia
- Occupation: Agronomist

Francisco Díaz Yubero (Spanish: [fɾan'θisko 'ðiaθ ʝu'βeɾo]; 10 April 1943 – 28 June 2024) was a Spanish agricultural engineer and politician who was a deputy in the First Legislature of the Parliament of La Rioja for the Progressive Riojan Party from 1983 to 1987.

== Early life and education ==
Díaz was born in Madrid on 10 April 1943 in the early days of Francisco Franco's dictatorship. He studied agricultural engineering at the Technical University of Valencia, where he earned a doctorate in 1977 defending his thesis Estabilización de los vinos frente a las precipitaciones de bitartrato potásico. Aplicación a los vinos de La Rioja ("Stabilizing wines against potassium bitartrate precipitation — Application to the wines of La Rioja"}. After defending his thesis on 21 July 1997, he worked for a while as a researcher at the University of La Rioja until 2008.

Díaz was a member of the Oenologists' Association of Rioja, participating in many functions and symposia. His publications on the subject of winegrowing have been cited in other works.

== Political life ==
Díaz was a militant in the Union of the Democratic Centre (UCD), a party for which he was Deputy of Logroño in the last days of the transition period in the wake of General Franco's death. With the coming of the first autonomous elections, one local section of the UCD, to which Díaz belonged, split from the party to form the Progressive Riojan Party (PRP).

The new PRP introduced itself to the political scene at the 1983 Riojan regional election, then headed by Luis Javier Rodríguez Moroy, the first President of La Rioja. They received 10,102 votes, some 7.52% of the valid ballots cast, thus earning themselves two of the 35 seats at stake. Díaz Yubero thereby found himself in the Parliament of La Rioja, as he had been second on the party's slate.

In the next election in 1987, the PRP once again won only two seats, while seeing its share of the vote shrink (9,212 votes; 6.39% of the valid ballots cast), but this time, Luis Javier Rodríguez Moroy was followed on the electoral slate by Leopoldo Virosta Garoz, thus leaving Díaz without a second term.

== Death ==
Díaz died on 28 June 2024, at the age of 81.
