= Espert =

Espert is a surname. Notable people with the surname include:

- Joaquín Espert (1938–2023), Spanish politician
- José Luis Espert (born 1961), Argentine economist and politician
- Núria Espert (born 1935), Spanish actress and director
