= Partido Galeguista =

Partido Galeguista may refer to:

- Partido Galeguista (1931), dissolved in 1950
- Partido Galeguista (1978), dissolved in 1984
- Partido Galeguista (Nationalist), 1984–1988
- Partido Galeguista Demócrata, founded 2004, known as Partido Galeguista until 2011
