= Manuel Fernández Ilarraza =

Spanish politician (1940–2026)

President of the Parliament of La Rioja
- In office 6 June 1987 – 11 June 1988
- Preceded by: Félix Palomo
- Succeeded by: Félix Palomo

Member of the Parliament of La Rioja
- In office 6 June 1987 – 21 June 1991

Member of the Logroño City Council
- In office 1972–1985

Personal details
- Born: Manuel María Fernández Ilarraza; 8 August 1940 Logroño, Spain
- Died: 4 January 2026 (aged 85) Logroño, Spain
- Party: CDS
- Occupation: Gynecologist

Manuel María Fernández Ilarraza (8 August 1940 – 4 January 2026) was a Spanish politician. A member of the Democratic and Social Centre, he served as president of the Parliament of La Rioja from 1987 to 1988.

Fernández died in Logroño on 4 January 2026, at the age of 85.
