= José Ignacio Ceniceros =

Spanish politician (born 1956)

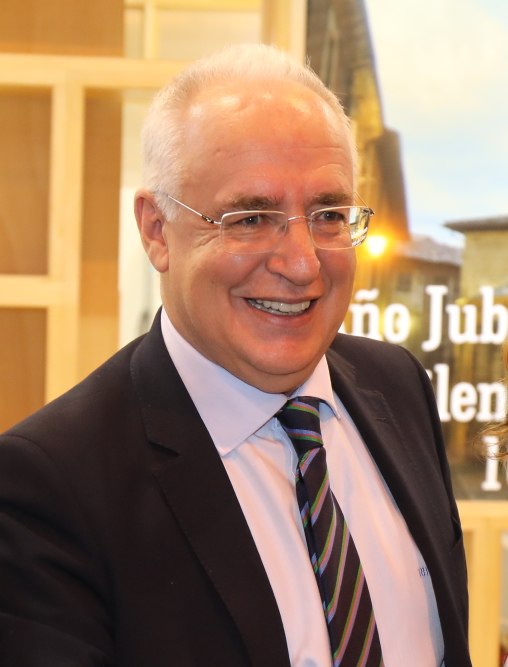

President of La Rioja
- In office 7 July 2015 – 29 August 2019
- Preceded by: Pedro Sanz Alonso
- Succeeded by: Concha Andreu

Mayor of Villoslada de Cameros
- In office 13 June 2015 – 2 July 2015
- Preceded by: Miguel García
- Succeeded by: Julio Elías

President of the Parliament of La Rioja
- In office 5 July 1999 – 18 June 2015
- Preceded by: María del Carmen Las Heras Pérez-Caballero
- Succeeded by: Ana Lourdes González

Personal details
- Born: José Ignacio Ceniceros González; 11 May 1956 (age 69) Villoslada de Cameros, Spain
- Party: People's Party (PP)

José Ignacio Ceniceros González (born 11 May 1956) is a Spanish politician and member of the People's Party (PP). Ceniceros, who previously held the position of President of the Parliament of La Rioja from 1999 to 2015, served as the President of La Rioja from 2015 to 2019.

Ceniceros' People's Party (PP) had retained a slim majority in the 2015 Riojan regional election on 24 May 2015, but lost five seats. Ceniceros listed the creation of higher quality jobs for Riojans as his top priority during his tenure as president. In the 2019 Riojan regional election, PP lost three seats and the position as the largest party in the Parliament of La Rioja.
