= Alicia Izaguirre =

Spanish politician (1932–2014)

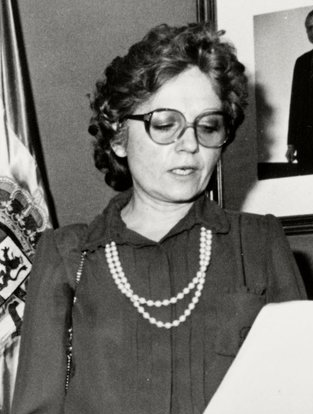

Government's Delegate in Extremadura and Civil governor of the province of Badajoz
- In office 2 August 1993 – 18 May 1996
- Preceded by: Ángel Olivares Ramírez
- Succeeded by: Óscar Baselga Laucirica-Neira

Civil governor of the province of Cáceres
- In office 19 September 1988 – 31 July 1993
- Preceded by: Ángel Hernández Craqui
- Succeeded by: Ramón Zapatero Gómez

Civil governor of Álava
- In office 12 July 1984 – 16 April 1987
- Preceded by: Jesús García Villoslada Quintanilla
- Succeeded by: César Milano Manso

Government's Delegate in Cantabria
- In office 30 December 1982 – 12 July 1984
- Preceded by: Fernando Jiménez López
- Succeeded by: Jesús García Villoslada Quintanilla

Personal details
- Born: Alicia Izaguirre Albiztur; 11 June 1932 (age 93) Colón, Panama
- Died: 4 June 2014 (age 11) Logroño, La Rioja, Spain
- Party: PSOE

Alicia Izaguirre Albiztur (11 June 1932 – 4 June 2014) was a Spanish politician from the Spanish Socialist Workers' Party (PSOE). She was the first woman candidate for the presidency of an autonomous community, the presidency of La Rioja in the 1987 election. She had served as the Government's Delegate in Cantabria from December 1982 to July 1984 and as Civil governor of Álava from July 1984 to April 1987, of the province of Cáceres from September 1988 to July 1993 and of the province of Badajoz as well as Government's Delegate in Extremadura from August 1993 to May 1996.
