= 1987 European Parliament election in Spain =

- 10 June 1987

All 60 Spanish seats in the European Parliament
- Opinion polls
- Registered: 28,450,491
- Turnout: 19,494,098 (68.5%)
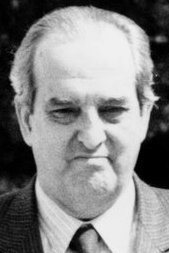

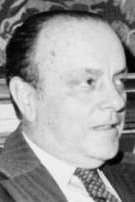

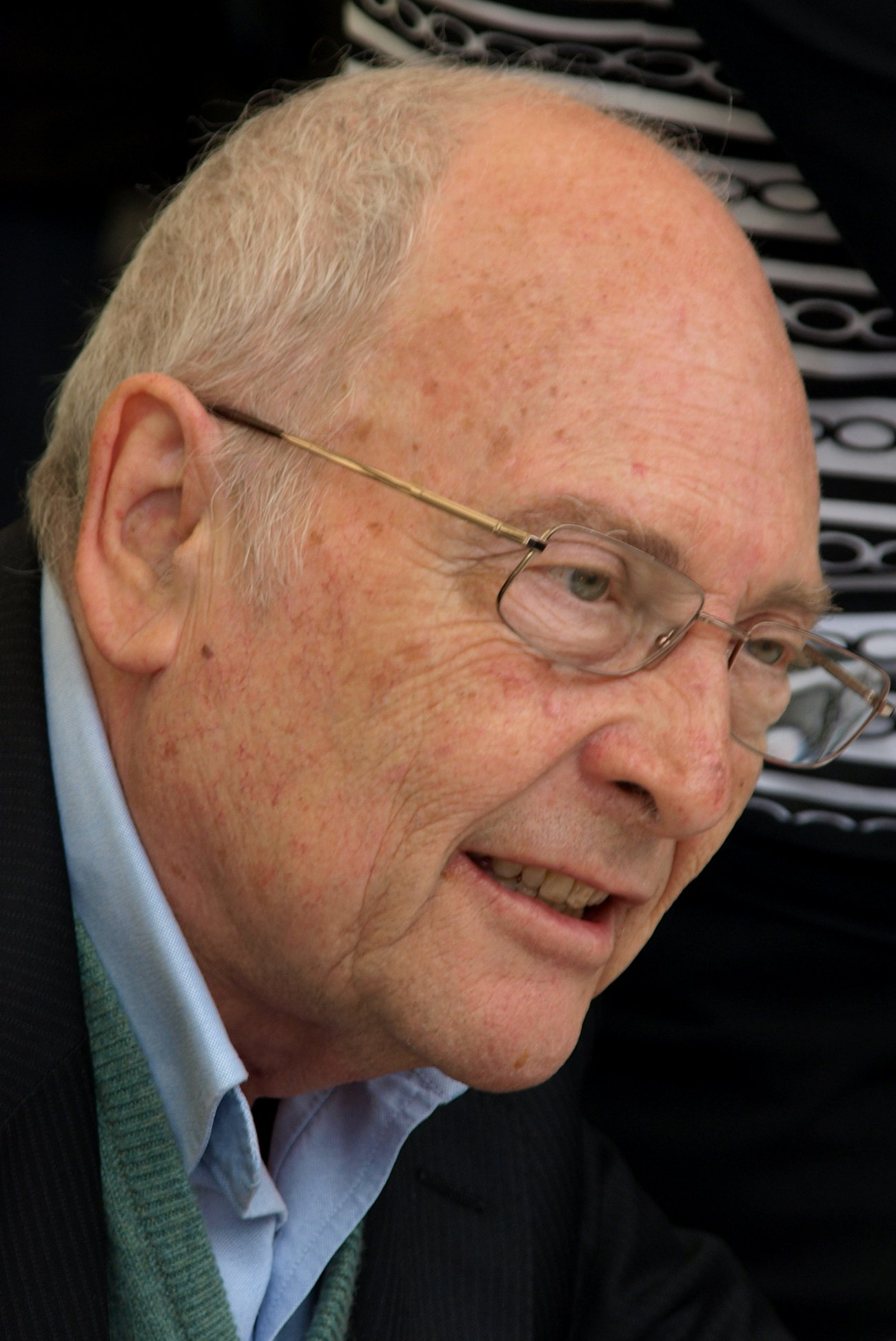

| | First party | Second party | Third party |
|---|---|---|---|
| Leader | Fernando Morán | Manuel Fraga | Eduard Punset |
| Party | PSOE | AP | CDS |
| Alliance | SOC | ED | NI |
| Leader since | 10 April 1987 | 16 March 1987 | 30 April 1987 |
| Leader's seat | Spain | Spain | Spain |
| Seats won | 28 | 17 | 7 |
| Popular vote | 7,522,706 | 4,747,283 | 1,976,093 |
| Percentage | 39.1% | 24.6% | 10.3% |
| | Fourth party | Fifth party | Sixth party |
| Leader | Fernando Pérez Royo | Carles Gasòliba | Txema Montero |
| Party | IU | CiU | HB |
| Alliance | COM | LDR; EPP | NI |
| Leader since | 25 April 1987 | 1 January 1986 | 28 April 1987 |
| Leader's seat | Spain | Spain | Spain |
| Seats won | 3 | 3 | 1 |
| Popular vote | 1,011,830 | 853,603 | 360,952 |
| Percentage | 5.3% | 4.4% | 1.9% |

An election was held in Spain on 10 June 1987 to elect the MEP delegation from the country for the 2nd European Parliament. All 60 seats allocated to the Spanish constituency as per the 1985 Treaty of Accession were up for election. It was held concurrently with regional elections in thirteen autonomous communities and local elections all across Spain.

Spain had acceded the European Communities on 1 January 1986 and had been represented in the European Parliament by 60 temporarily appointed delegates until a proper election could be held. As a European-wide election was due in 1989, elected MEPs only served for the remainder of the European Parliament term.

== Background ==
The ruling Spanish Socialist Workers' Party (PSOE) designated former Foreign Affairs Minister Fernando Morán to lead their campaign. The main opposition People's Alliance party (AP), running on its own after the People's Democratic Party (PDP) and Liberal Party (PL) broke away from the People's Coalition, chose Manuel Fraga—who had resigned as party leader in December 1986—to lead the party list. Adolfo Suárez had considered running as main candidate for his Democratic and Social Centre party (CDS), but declined after the electoral law was amended by the ruling Spanish Socialist Workers' Party to make elected MEPs incompatible for posts in the Cortes Generales—Suárez was deputy in the Congress of Deputies, and would have been forced to renounce one of the two offices if elected.

== Overview ==
=== Electoral system ===
Voting for the European Parliament in Spain was based on universal suffrage, which comprised all Spanish nationals over 18 years of age with full political rights, provided that they had not been deprived of the right to vote by a final sentence, nor were legally incapacitated.

60 European Parliament seats were allocated to Spain as per the 1985 Treaty of Accession. All were elected in a single multi-member constituency—comprising the entire national territory—using the D'Hondt method and closed-list proportional voting, with no electoral threshold. The use of this electoral method resulted in an effective threshold depending on district magnitude and vote distribution.

The law did not provide for by-elections to fill vacant seats; instead, any vacancies arising after the proclamation of candidates and during the legislative term were filled by the next candidates on the party lists or, when required, by designated substitutes.

=== Outgoing delegation ===
The table below shows the composition of the Spanish delegation in the chamber at the time of the election call.

Delegation composition in May 1987
| Groups | Parties | MEPs | |
| Groups | Parties | Seats | Total |
|---|---|---|---|
| Socialist Group | PSOE | 36 | 36 |
| European Democrats | AP | 12 | 14 |
| European Democrats | UM | 1 | 14 |
| European Democrats | PDP | 1 | 14 |
| European People's Party | PDP | 2 | 5 |
| European People's Party | EAJ/PNV | 2 | 5 |
| European People's Party | UDC | 1 | 5 |
| Liberal and Democratic Reformist Group | CDC | 2 | 2 |
| Liberal and Democratic Reformist Group | INDEP | 1 | 2 |
| Rainbow Group | EE | 1 | 1 |
| Non-Inscrits | INDEP | 2 | 2 |

== Parties and candidates ==
The electoral law allowed for parties and federations registered in the interior ministry, alliances and groupings of electors to present lists of candidates. Parties and federations intending to form an alliance were required to inform the relevant electoral commission within 10 days of the election call. In order to be entitled to run, parties, federations, alliances and groupings of electors needed to secure the signature of at least 15,000 registered electors; this requirement could be lifted and replaced through the signature of at least 50 elected officials—deputies, senators, MEPs or members from the legislative assemblies of autonomous communities or from local city councils. Electors and elected officials were disallowed from signing for more than one list.

Below is a list of the main parties and alliances which contested the election:

| Candidacy | Parties and alliances | Leading candidate | Ideology | Ref. |
|---|---|---|---|---|
| PSOE | List: Spanish Socialist Workers' Party (PSOE); Socialists' Party of Catalonia (PSC) | Fernando Morán | Social democracy | |
| AP | List: People's Alliance (AP); Navarrese People's Union (UPN); Centrists of Galicia (CdG) | Manuel Fraga | Conservatism | |
| CDS | List: Democratic and Social Centre (CDS) | Eduard Punset | Centrism; Liberalism | |
| CiU | List: Democratic Convergence of Catalonia (CDC); Democratic Union of Catalonia (UDC) | Carles Gasòliba | Catalan nationalism Centrism | |
| IU | List: Communist Party of Spain (PCE); Socialist Action Party (PASOC); Communist Party of the Peoples of Spain (PCPE); Progressive Federation (FP); Republican Left (IR); United Candidacy of Workers (CUT); Initiative for Catalonia (IC) – Unified Socialist Party of Catalonia (PSUC) – Agreement of Left Nationalists (ENE) | Fernando Pérez Royo | Socialism; Communism | |
| UE | List: Basque Nationalist Party (EAJ/PNV); Nationalist Galicianist Party (PGN) | Jon Gangoiti | Peripheral nationalism | |
| HB | List: Popular Unity (HB) – People's Socialist Revolutionary Party (HASI) – Basque Nationalist Action (EAE/ANV) – Patriotic Socialist Committees (ASK) | Txema Montero | Basque independence Abertzale left Revolutionary socialism | |
| IP | List: Basque Country Left (EE); Galician Socialist Party–Galician Left (PSG–EG); Agreement of Left Nationalists (ENE); Socialist Party of Mallorca (PSM); Socialist Party of Menorca (PSM); Aragonese Union (UA–CHA) | Mario Onaindia | Left-wing nationalism | |
| CEP | List: Basque Solidarity (EA); Republican Left of Catalonia (ERC); Galician Nationalist Party (PNG) | Carlos Garaikoetxea | Left-wing nationalism | |
| PDP | List: People's Democratic Party (PDP) | Javier Rupérez | Christian democracy | |
| UM | List: Majorcan Union (UM) | Antoni Rosés | Liberalism; Regionalism | |

== Opinion polls ==
The table below lists voting intention estimates in reverse chronological order, showing the most recent first and using the dates when the survey fieldwork was done, as opposed to the date of publication. Where the fieldwork dates are unknown, the date of publication is given instead. The highest percentage figure in each polling survey is displayed with its background shaded in the leading party's colour. If a tie ensues, this is applied to the figures with the highest percentages. The "Lead" column on the right shows the percentage-point difference between the parties with the highest percentages in a given poll. When available, seat projections are also displayed below the voting estimates in a smaller font.

| Polling firm/Commissioner | Fieldwork date | Sample size | Turnout | PSOE | AP | CDS | CiU | IU | UE | HB | PTE–UC | IP | CEP | PDP | FN | AS | Lead |
|---|---|---|---|---|---|---|---|---|---|---|---|---|---|---|---|---|---|
| 1987 EP election | 10 Jun 1987 | —N/a | 68.5 | 39.1; 28 | 24.6; 17 | 10.3; 7 | 4.4; 3 | 5.3; 3 | 1.2; 0 | 1.9; 1 | 1.2; 0 | 1.4; 0 | 1.7; 1 | 0.9; 0 | 0.6; 0 | 0.6; 0 | 14.5 |
| Gallup/Época | 4 Jun 1987 | ? | ? | 46.8; 29/30 | 24.7; 16 | 9.3; 6 | 4.0; 2/3 | 4.4; 3 | ? 1 | – | ? 1 | ? 1 | – | – | – | – | 22.1 |
| Sigma Dos/Diario 16 | 30 May–1 Jun 1987 | 2,500 | ? | 41.0– 43.0; 25/27 | 24.0– 26.0; 15/16 | 11.0– 13.0; 7/9 | 4.0– 4.8; 2/3 | 4.5– 5.5; 3 | 1.0– 1.6; 0/1 | 1.4– 2.0; 1 | – | 1.4– 1.9; 1 | 0.8– 1.4; 0/1 | – | 0.8– 1.4; 0/1 | 0.8– 1.4; 0/1 | 17.0 |
| Iope–Etmar/El Periódico | 25–29 May 1987 | 2,497 | ? | 41.6; 28 | 25.2; 17 | 10.0; 6 | 4.4; 3 | 5.4; 3 | 0.8; 0 | 2.0; 1 | 1.0; 0 | 2.0; 1 | 1.9; 1 | – | 0.5; 0 | 0.5; 0 | 16.4 |
| Demoscopia/El País | 22–26 May 1987 | 11,000 | ? | 38.6; 23/26 | 24.4; 15/17 | 14.7; 9/10 | 4.7; 2/3 | 3.3; 1/2 | 1.4; 0/1 | 1.7; 0/1 | 1.3; 0/1 | 1.6; 0/1 | 1.4; 0/1 | 1.3; 0/1 | 0.7; 0 | 0.5; 0 | 14.2 |
| CIS | 18–19 May 1987 | 2,497 | ? | 45.1; 30 | 26.4; 17 | 9.9; 6 | 4.2; 2 | 4.0; 2 | – | – | – | – | – | – | – | – | 18.7 |
| Sigma Dos/Diario 16 | 8 May 1987 | ? | ? | 42.3; 25/27 | 26.1; 14/17 | 10.8; 6/8 | 5.1; 3 | 5.2; 3 | 1.6; 1 | 1.4; 0/1 | – | 1.1; 0/1 | 1.1; 0/1 | – | 1.6; 1 | 2.1; 1 | 16.2 |
| 1986 general election | 22 Jun 1986 | —N/a | 70.5 | 44.1 (30) | 26.0 (17) | 9.2 (6) | 5.0 (3) | 4.6 (3) | 1.5 (1) | 1.1 (0) | 1.1 (0) | 0.8 (0) | 0.4 (0) | – | – | – | 18.1 |

== Results ==
=== Overall ===
Summary of the 10 June 1987 European Parliament election results in Spain →
| Parties and alliances | Popular vote | | | Seats | |
| Parties and alliances | Votes | % | ±pp | Total | +/− |
|---|---|---|---|---|---|
| Spanish Socialist Workers' Party (PSOE) | 7,522,706 | 39.06 | n/a | 28 | n/a |
| People's Alliance (AP) | 4,747,283 | 24.65 | n/a | 17 | n/a |
| Democratic and Social Centre (CDS) | 1,976,093 | 10.26 | n/a | 7 | n/a |
| United Left (IU) | 1,011,830 | 5.25 | n/a | 3 | n/a |
| Convergence and Union (CiU) | 853,603 | 4.43 | n/a | 3 | n/a |
| Popular Unity (HB) | 360,952 | 1.87 | n/a | 1 | n/a |
| Coalition for the Europe of the Peoples (EA–ERC–PNG) | 326,911 | 1.70 | n/a | 1 | n/a |
| Left of the Peoples (IP) | 261,328 | 1.36 | n/a | 0 | n/a |
| Europeanist Union (PNV–PGN) | 226,570 | 1.18 | n/a | 0 | n/a |
| Workers' Party of Spain–Communist Unity (PTE–UC) | 222,680 | 1.16 | n/a | 0 | n/a |
| Andalusian Party (PA) | 185,550 | 0.96 | n/a | 0 | n/a |
| People's Democratic Party (PDP) | 170,866 | 0.89 | n/a | 0 | n/a |
| Valencian Union (UV) | 162,128 | 0.84 | n/a | 0 | n/a |
| National Front (FN) | 122,799 | 0.64 | n/a | 0 | n/a |
| Social Action (AS) | 116,761 | 0.61 | n/a | 0 | n/a |
| The Greens (LV) | 107,625 | 0.56 | n/a | 0 | n/a |
| Regionalist Aragonese Party (PAR) | 105,865 | 0.55 | n/a | 0 | n/a |
| Canarian Independent Groups (AIC) | 96,895 | 0.50 | n/a | 0 | n/a |
| Workers' Socialist Party (PST) | 77,132 | 0.40 | n/a | 0 | n/a |
| Confederation of the Greens (CV) | 65,574 | 0.34 | n/a | 0 | n/a |
| Galician Nationalist Bloc (BNG) | 53,116 | 0.28 | n/a | 0 | n/a |
| United Extremadura (EU) | 39,369 | 0.20 | n/a | 0 | n/a |
| Revolutionary Workers' Party of Spain (PORE) | 30,157 | 0.16 | n/a | 0 | n/a |
| National Assembly of Medicine Students and Associates (ANEMYA) | 30,143 | 0.16 | n/a | 0 | n/a |
| Internationalist Socialist Workers' Party (POSI) | 25,270 | 0.13 | n/a | 0 | n/a |
| Social Democratic Coalition (CSD) | 25,058 | 0.13 | n/a | 0 | n/a |
| Spanish Phalanx of the CNSO (FE–JONS) | 23,407 | 0.12 | n/a | 0 | n/a |
| Humanist Platform (PH–FV) | 22,333 | 0.12 | n/a | 0 | n/a |
| Communist Unification of Spain (UCE) | 21,482 | 0.11 | n/a | 0 | n/a |
| Majorcan Union (UM) | 19,066 | 0.10 | n/a | 0 | n/a |
| Valencian Coalition Party (PCV) | 14,749 | 0.08 | n/a | 0 | n/a |
| Regionalist Party of Cantabria (PRC) | 14,553 | 0.08 | n/a | 0 | n/a |
| Nationalist Party of Castile and León (PANCAL) | 12,616 | 0.07 | n/a | 0 | n/a |
| Andalusian Liberation (LA) | 9,881 | 0.05 | n/a | 0 | n/a |
| Democratic Spanish Party (PED) | 9,146 | 0.05 | n/a | 0 | n/a |
| Blank ballots | 189,729 | 0.99 | n/a | | |
| Total | 19,261,226 | | | 60 | n/a |
| Valid votes | 19,261,226 | 98.81 | n/a | | |
| Invalid votes | 232,872 | 1.19 | n/a | | |
| Votes cast / turnout | 19,494,098 | 68.52 | n/a | | |
| Abstentions | 8,956,393 | 31.48 | n/a | | |
| Registered voters | 28,450,491 | | | | |

Popular vote
| PSOE | 39.06% |
| AP | 24.65% |
| CDS | 10.26% |
| IU | 5.25% |
| CiU | 4.43% |
| HB | 1.87% |
| EA–ERC–PNG | 1.70% |
| IP | 1.36% |
| PNV–PGN | 1.18% |
| PTE–UC | 1.16% |
| Others | 8.11% |
| Blank ballots | 0.99% |

Seats
| PSOE | 46.67% |
| AP | 28.33% |
| CDS | 11.67% |
| IU | 5.00% |
| CiU | 5.00% |
| HB | 1.67% |
| EA–ERC–PNG | 1.67% |

=== Maps ===
Vote winner strength by province.

Vote winner strength by autonomous community.

=== Distribution by European group ===
Summary of political group distribution in the 2nd European Parliament (1984–1989)
| Groups | Parties | Seats | Total | % |
|---|---|---|---|---|
| Socialist Group (SOC) | Spanish Socialist Workers' Party (PSOE) | 28 | 28 | 46.67 |
| European Democrats (ED) | People's Alliance (AP) | 17 | 17 | 28.33 |
| Communist and Allies Group (COM) | Communist Party of Spain (PCE); Initiative for Catalonia (IC); Socialist Action Party (PASOC) | 1; 1; 1 | 3 | 5.00 |
| Liberal Democrat and Reform Party (LDR) | Democratic Convergence of Catalonia (CDC) | 2 | 2 | 3.33 |
| European People's Party (EPP) | Democratic Union of Catalonia (UDC) | 1 | 1 | 1.67 |
| Rainbow Group (RBW) | Basque Solidarity (EA) | 1 | 1 | 1.67 |
| Non-Inscrits (NI) | Democratic and Social Centre (CDS); Popular Unity (HB) | 7; 1 | 8 | 13.33 |
| Total | | 60 | 60 | 100.00 |

== Bibliography ==
- Ley Orgánica 5/1985, de 19 de junio, del Régimen Electoral General (Organic Law 5/1985). Official State Gazette (in Spanish). 19 June 1985 [version as of 3 April 1987]. BOE-A-1985-11672.
- Act concerning the election of the representatives of the Assembly by direct universal suffrage. Official Journal of the European Communities. 20 September 1976. 41976X1008(01).
- Treaty (signed on 12 June 1985) between the Kingdom of Belgium, the Kingdom of Denmark, the Federal Republic of Germany, the Hellenic Republic, the French Republic, Ireland, the Italian Republic, the Grand Duchy of Luxembourg, the Kingdom of the Netherlands, the United Kingdom of Great Britain and Northern Ireland (Member States of the European Communities) and the Kingdom of Spain and the Portuguese Republic concerning the accession of the Kingdom of Spain and the Portuguese Republic to the European Economic Community and to the European Atomic Energy Community. Official Journal of the European Communities. 15 November 1985. 11985I/TXT.
