= Antonio Rodríguez Basulto =

Spanish politician

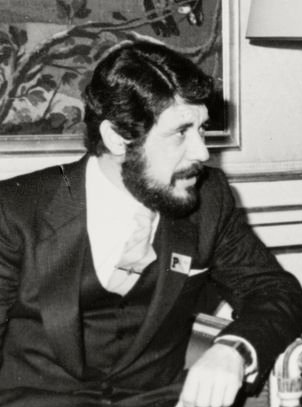

President of La Rioja
- In office 25 January 1983 – 30 May 1983
- Preceded by: Luis Javier Rodríguez Moroy
- Succeeded by: José María de Miguel

Personal details
- Born: Antonio Rodríguez Basulto; 16 April 1945 (age 81) Adanero, Spain
- Party: Spanish Socialist Workers' Party

Antonio Rodríguez Basulto (born 16 April 1945) is a Spanish politician, who served as the president of La Rioja between January and May 1983.
