= List of presidents of the Parliament of La Rioja =

President of the Parliament of La Rioja
- Presidente del Parlamento de La Rioja
- Flag of La Rioja
- Incumbent; Jesús María García since 20 June 2019
- Member of: Parliament of La Rioja
- Formation: 15 July 1982
- First holder: Domingo Álvarez Ruiz

This article lists the presidents of the Parliament of La Rioja, the regional legislature of La Rioja.

== Presidents ==
^{No.}	Name	Portrait	Party	Took office	Left office	^{Legs.}	^{Refs.}
1	Domingo Álvarez Ruiz		People's Alliance	15 July 1982	27 December 1982	Prov.	
2	Félix Palomo		Socialist Party of La Rioja	24 May 1983	1987	1st	
3	Manuel María Fernández		Democratic and Social Centre	6 July 1987	11 July 1988	2nd	
2	Félix Palomo		Socialist Party of La Rioja	11 July 1988	1991	2nd	
2	Félix Palomo		Socialist Party of La Rioja	21 June 1991	1995	3rd	
4	Carmen Las Heras		People's Party of La Rioja	23 June 1995	1999	4th	
5	José Ignacio Ceniceros		People's Party of La Rioja	2 July 1999	2003	5th	
5	José Ignacio Ceniceros		People's Party of La Rioja	23 June 2003	2007	6th	
5	José Ignacio Ceniceros		People's Party of La Rioja	21 June 2007	2011	7th	
5	José Ignacio Ceniceros		People's Party of La Rioja	16 June 2011	18 June 2015	8th	
6	Ana Lourdes González		People's Party of La Rioja	18 June 2015	2019	9th	
7	Jesús María García		Socialist Party of La Rioja	20 June 2019		10th	
