= Europeanist Union =

Europeanist Union Unión Europeísta
- Abbreviation: UE; EB
- Founded: 1987
- Dissolved: 1989
- Succeeded by: Nationalist Coalition (1989)
- Ideology: Peripheral nationalism
- Political position: Centre-right

Europeanist Union (Spanish: Unión Europeísta, UE; Basque: Europar Batasuna, EB) was a Spanish electoral list in the European Parliament election in 1987 made up from regionalist parties.

== Composition ==
Party	Scope
Basque Nationalist Party (EAJ/PNV)	Basque Country, Navarre
Nationalist Galicianist Party (PGN)	Galicia

== Electoral performance ==
=== European Parliament ===
European Parliament
Election	Vote	%	Score	Seats	+/–
1987	226,570	1.2	9th	0 / 60	—
