= Fernando Pérez Royo =

Spanish academic and politician (born 1943)

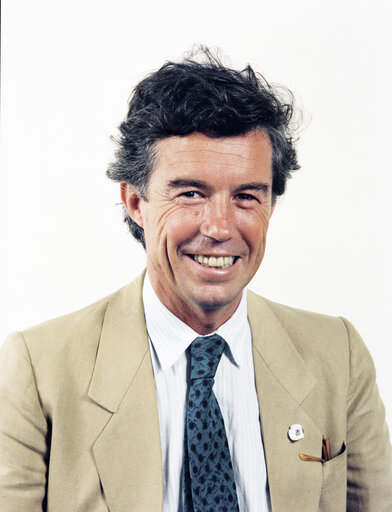
- Born: 25 January 1943 (age 83); Alcalá de Guadaíra, Spain
- Education: University of Seville; University of Bologna
- Occupation: Academic
- Political party: Communist Party of Spain; United Left; Spanish Socialist Workers' Party
- Children: 2

Fernando Pérez Royo (born 25 January 1943) is a Spanish academic and politician who has served in the Spanish Parliament and European Parliament. He has been a member of various political parties, including the Communist Party of Spain.

== Early life and education ==
Pérez was born in Alcalá de Guadaíra on 25 January 1943. His father was a physician.

Pérez graduated from the University of Seville in 1965 receiving a degree in law. He obtained his PhD from the University of Bologna in 1968. His thesis was about tax laws.

== Career ==
Following his graduation Pérez joined his alma mater, University of Seville, as an adjunct professor. He worked at the University of Valencia as an associate professor from 1972 to 1974. He then joined the University of Seville and worked there until 1981. He was elected to the Spanish Parliament representing the Communist Party of Spain in 1979, and his tenure at the parliament lasted until 1986.

Pérez served at the European Parliament for four consecutive terms between 1987 and 2004. In the second term of the European Parliament he was a member of the Communist and Allies Group and in the third term he was a member of the European United Left. He was elected from the United Left for both terms. Pérez was one of the leaders carrying out a very successful election campaign in the 1989 European Parliament election for the United Left. In the fourth and fifth terms at the European Parliament, he was part of the Party of European Socialists and elected to the Parliament from the Spanish Socialist Workers' Party. He was the vice president of the European Parliament between 1989 and 1992.

Pérez was a member of the Council of Taxpayers until 2012. He is author of three books on tax laws.

== Personal life ==
Pérez is married and has two daughters. He is a fan of bullfighting.
