= Coalition for the Europe of the Peoples =

Coalition for the Europe of the Peoples Coalición por la Europa de los Pueblos
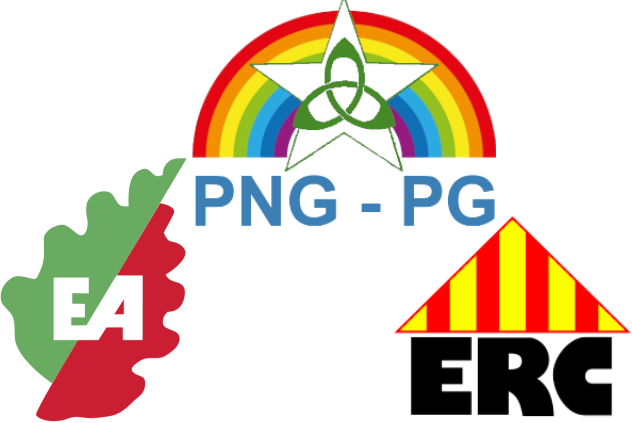
- Founded: 1987
- Dissolved: 1989
- Succeeded by: For the Europe of the Peoples (1989)
- Ideology: Peripheral nationalism
- European Parliament group: Rainbow Group

Coalition for the Europe of the Peoples (Spanish: Coalición por la Europa de los Pueblos, CEP; Basque: Herrien Europaren Alde, HEA) was a Spanish electoral list in the European Parliament election in 1987 made up from regionalist parties.

In 1987, the CEP obtained 326,911 votes in Spain (1.7%), which made it the seventh largest political association, leading it to win one MEP seat. The coalition was the most successful in Catalonia (112,107 votes, 3.7%), Galicia (12,277 votes, 1.0%), Navarre (18,991 votes, 6.74%), and Basque Country (172,411, 16.06%). The CEP did not exceed 0.2% of the vote in any other autonomous community.

== Composition ==
Party	Scope
Basque Solidarity (EA)	Basque Country, Navarre
Republican Left of Catalonia (ERC)	Catalonia
Galician Nationalist Party (PNG)	Galicia

== Electoral performance ==
=== European Parliament ===
European Parliament
Election	Vote	%	Seats
1987	326,911 (#7)	1.70	1 / 60
