= Villoslada de Cameros =

- Municipality
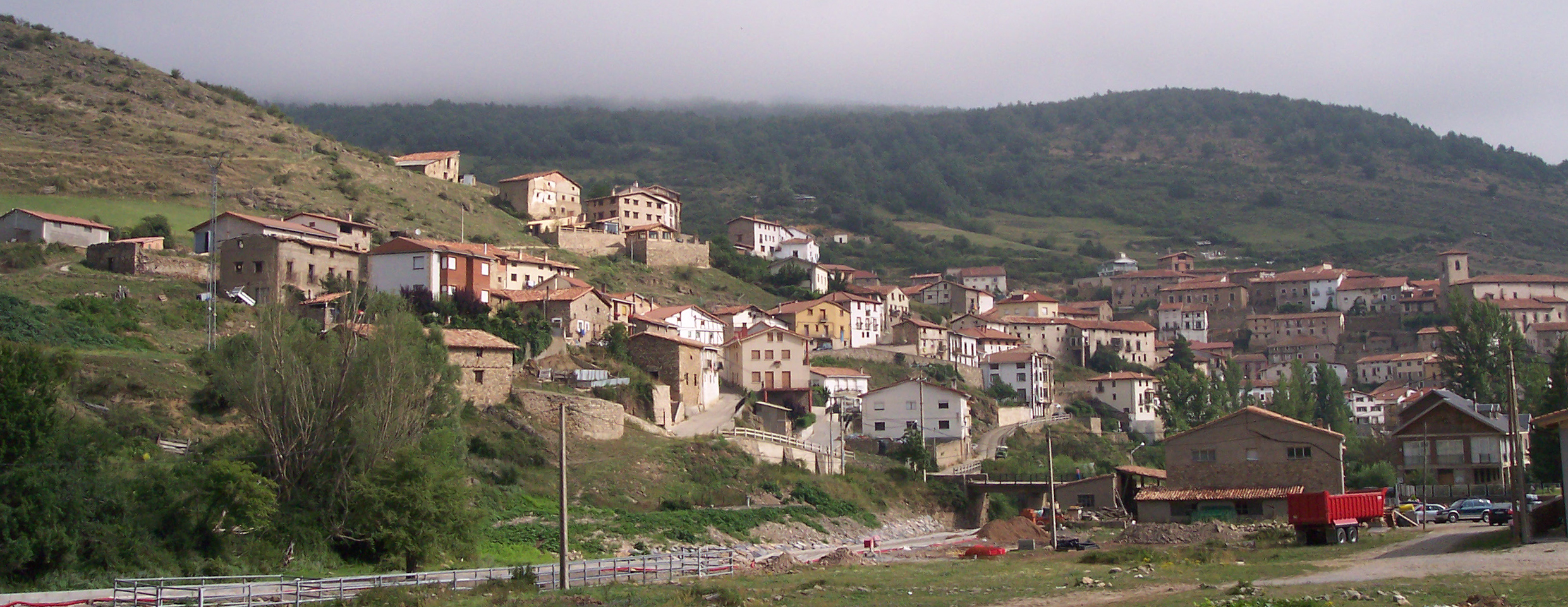
- Skyline of Villoslada de Cameros

- Location within La Rioja, Spain Location within Spain
- Coordinates: 42°06′50″N 2°40′24″W
- Country: Spain
- Autonomous community: La Rioja
- Comarca: Camero Nuevo

Government
  - Mayor: Julio Ignacio Elías Sánchez (PP)

Area
  - Total: 94.71 km^{2} (36.57 sq mi)
- Elevation: 1,064 m (3,491 ft)

Population (2025-01-01)
  - Total: 351
- Demonym: villosladense
- Postal code: 26125
- Website: www.villosladadecameros.org

Villoslada de Cameros is a village in the province and autonomous community of La Rioja, Spain. The municipality covers an area of 94.71 square kilometres (36.57 sq mi) and as of 2011 had a population of 367 people.

== Politics ==
List of mayors since the democratic elections of 1979
| Term | Mayor | Political party |
|---|---|---|
| 1979–1983 | Siro Ceniceros Vallejo | CD |
| 1983–1987 | Siro Ceniceros Vallejo | AP |
| 1987–1991 | José Julián Sáenz García | PDP |
| 1991–1995 | Siro Ceniceros Vallejo | PP |
| 1995–1999 | Siro Ceniceros Vallejo | PP |
| 1999–2003 | José Julián Sáenz García | PP |
| 2003–2007 | José Julián Sáenz García | PP |
| 2007–2011 | José Julián Sáenz García | PP |
| 2011–2015 | Miguel Ángel García Alcolea | PP |
| 2015–2019 | José Ignacio Ceniceros/Julio Ignacio Elías Sánchez | PP |
| 2019–2023 | n/d | n/d |
| 2023– | n/d | n/d |
