= Félix Palomo =

Spanish politician (1937–2021)

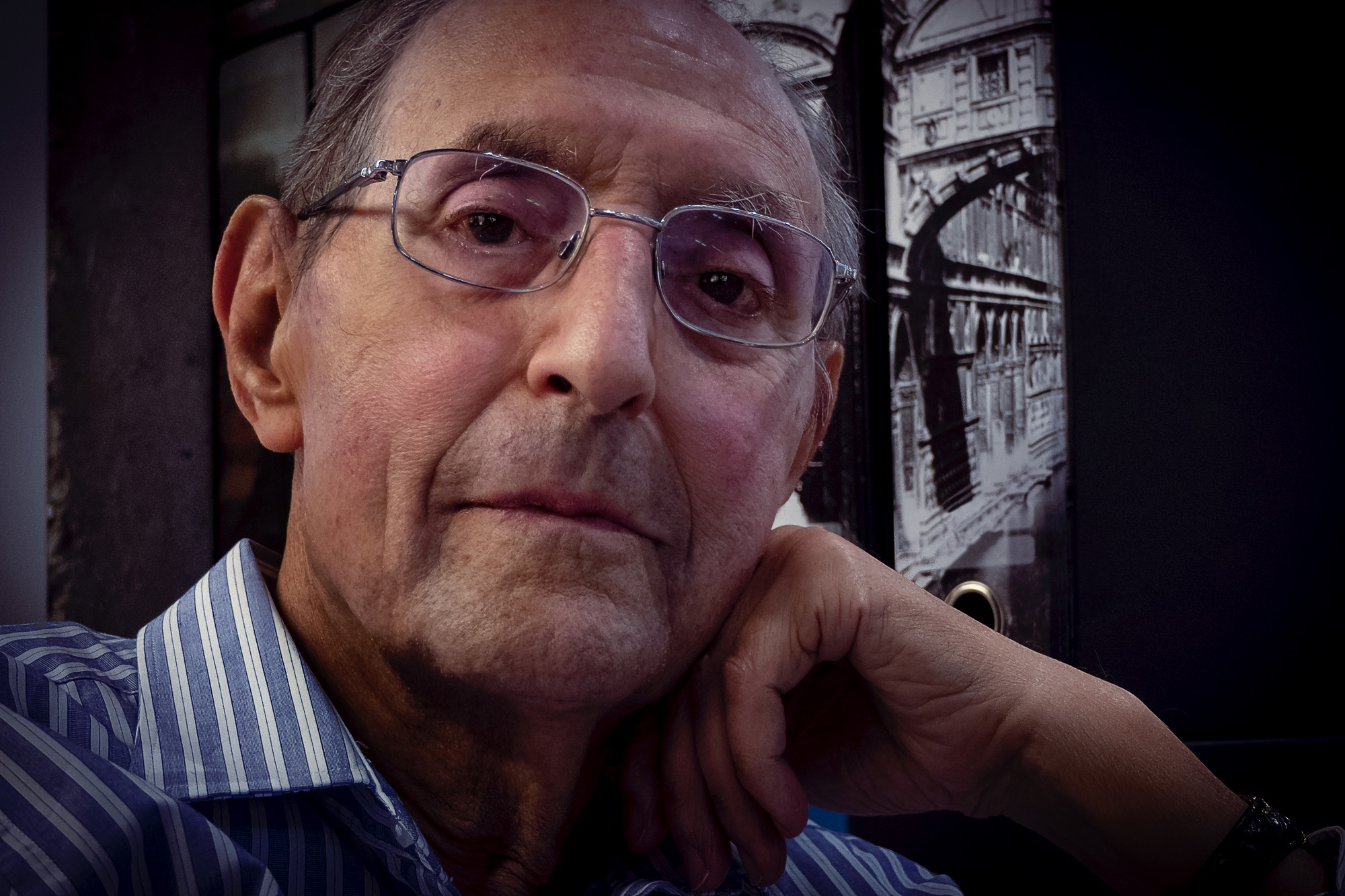

Member of the Senate of Spain
- In office 15 June 1977 – 31 August 1982
- Constituency: La Rioja

President of the Parliament of La Rioja
- In office 1983–1987
- Preceded by: Domingo Álvarez Ruiz de Viñaspre
- Succeeded by: Manuel María Fernández Ilarraza
- In office 1988–1995
- Preceded by: Manuel María Fernández Ilarraza
- Succeeded by: Carmen Las Heras Pérez-Caballero

Personal details
- Born: Félix Palomo Saavedra; 15 March 1937 San Pedro de Mérida, Spain
- Died: 7 October 2021 (aged 84)
- Party: PSOE

Félix Palomo Saavedra (15 March 1937 − 7 October 2021) was a Spanish politician. A member of the Spanish Socialist Workers' Party, he served in the Senate of Spain from 1977 to 1982 and was President of the Parliament of La Rioja from 1983 to 1987 and again from 1988 to 1995.
