= José María de Miguel =

Spanish politician (born 1950)

President of La Rioja
- In office 30 May 1983 – 30 June 1987
- Preceded by: Antonio Rodríguez Basulto
- Succeeded by: Joaquín Espert

Personal details
- Born: José María de Miguel Gil; 1950 (age 75–76) Logroño, La Rioja, Spain
- Party: Spanish Socialist Workers' Party

José María de Miguel Gil (born 1950) is a Spanish politician and former President of La Rioja between 1983 and 1987.
