= National Front (Spain, 1986) =

National Front Frente Nacional
- Leader: Blas Piñar
- Founded: 1986
- Dissolved: 1993
- Preceded by: Fuerza nueva
- Youth wing: Juventudes del Frente Nacional
- Ideology: Francoism; Spanish nationalism National Catholicism
- Political position: Far-right
- Slogan: Ten coraje Hay un camino a la Derecha

The National Front (Spanish: Frente Nacional) was a far-right political party in Spain. The National Front was founded and directed by Blas Piñar as a successor to the Fuerza Nueva. It was created in 1986 with the economic support of other groups of the European far right such as the French Front National and the Italian Social Movement with the objective of increasing their sphere of influence in the European Parliament. In 1987 the National Front did not obtain the 70,000 votes (0.63%) required for representation. A drawn-out debacle ensued that intensified because of the 59,964 votes it obtained at the following elections. Many of the party members, moved by their contempt for the gerontocracy at the head of the party, joined with the Juntas Españolas, the Unión Patriótica, and the Círculo Español de Amigos de Europa (CEDADE), a neo-Nazi group. In order to slow the decline of its membership, the National Front created the "Youth of the National Front" (Juventudes del Frente Nacional), a section headed by Luis José Cillero. With Cillero, who many called the "young ancient", the loss of membership to Juntas Españolas slowed.

In 1992, the European allies of Piñar, with Jean-Marie Le Pen at the lead, threatened to cut their support if he continued to fail. Piñar thought of passing his authority to his right-hand man, Miguel Bernard Remón, founder of Manos Limpias, but he was able to continue to serve as leader after contacting the Juntas Españolas and proposing a new, joint venture.
