= Nationalist Galicianist Party =

Nationalist Galicianist Party Partido Galeguista Nacionalista
- Leader: Ramón Martínez López and Manuel Beiras García
- Founded: 1984
- Dissolved: 1988
- Split from: Partido Galeguista
- Succeeded by: Galician Nationalist Party–Galicianist Party
- Ideology: Social-liberalism; Galician nationalism Progressivism; Federalism
- Political position: Centre

The Nationalist Galicianist Party (PGN or PG(N), Partido Galeguista Nacionalista or Partido Galeguista (Nacionalista) in Galician language) was a Galician nationalist party founded in 1984.

== History ==
The PGN was founded in 1984, after the decision of the Partido Galeguista (PG) to join the Galician Coalition. A group of fifty militants led by Ramón Martínez López and Manuel Beiras García dissatisfied with the decision decided to organize a new Galician nationalist political party. The party didn't present lists to the Galician elections of 1985 or to the general elections of 1986. In the 1986 European Parliament elections the party ran in a coalition with the Basque Nationalist Party, called the Europeanist Union. The coalition gained 5,322 votes in Galiza (0.43% of the Galician vote).

In 1988 the PGN merged with the PNG form the Galician Nationalist Party-Galicianist Party.

== Elections ==
Election	Votes	%	Seats
Spanish municipal elections, 1987	4,176	0.31%	2 / 4,044
European Parliament election, 1987	5,322	0.43%	0 / 350
