= Luis Javier Rodríguez Moroy =

Spanish politician

President of La Rioja
- In office 27 August 1982 – 25 January 1983
- Preceded by: Office created
- Succeeded by: Antonio Rodríguez Basulto

Personal details
- Born: Luis Javier Rodríguez Moroy; 1944 (age 81–82) Logroño, La Rioja, Spain
- Party: UCD (1977–1982); PRP (1982–)

Luis Javier Rodríguez Moroy (born 1944) is a Spanish politician and former President of La Rioja between 1982 and 1983. He resigned the post after losing his seat in the 1982 Congress of Deputies election, as the condition of deputy was a requirement for maintaining the office of president.
