= Joaquín Espert =

Spanish politician (1938–2023)

President of La Rioja
- In office 27 July 1987 – 8 January 1990
- Preceded by: José María de Miguel
- Succeeded by: José Ignacio Pérez Sáenz

Personal details
- Born: Joaquín Espert Pérez-Caballero; 11 September 1938 Logroño, Spain
- Died: 14 June 2023 (aged 84) Logroño, Spain
- Party: AP; PP

Joaquín Espert Pérez-Caballero (11 September 1938 – 14 June 2023) was a Spanish politician who served as President of La Rioja between 1987 and 1990.

Espert died on 14 June 2023, at the age of 84.
