= Valles de Sadacia =

Valles de Sadacia VdlT
- Wine region
- Valles de Sadacia VdlT in the region of La Rioja
- Type: Vino de la Tierra
- Country: Spain

Valles de Sadacia is a Spanish geographical indication for Vino de la Tierra wines located in the autonomous region of La Rioja. Vino de la Tierra is one step below the mainstream Denominación de Origen indication on the Spanish wine quality ladder.

Only white wines are included in Valles de Sadacia. Three types are considered: dry (seco), semi-dry (semiseco or semidulce) and sweet (dulce).

== History ==
The Valles de Sadacia geographic indication was created in 2003, on the initiative of the Agricultural Authorities of the Government of La Rioja, in collaboration with Castillo de Maetierra, a winery specialized in the production of quality white wine. The name Sadacia derives from Sádaco, the ancient Roman name of the river Cidacos.

== Geography ==
Valles de Sadacia comprises four of the seven river valleys that cross La Rioja: the rivers Iregua, Leza, Cidacos and Alhama. This area receives the lowest rainfall and most hours of sunlight in the La Rioja region.

The following municipalities are covered: Agoncillo, Aguilar del Río Alhama, Albelda, Alberite, Alcanadre, Aldeanueva de Ebro, Alfaro, Arnedillo, Arnedo, Arrúbal, Ausejo, Autol, Bergasa, Bergasilla, Calahorra, Cervera del Río Alhama, Clavijo, Corera, Cornago, El Redal, El Villar de Arnedo, Galilea, Grávalos, Herce, Igea, Lagunilla de Jubera, Leza de Río Leza, Murillo de Río Leza, Muro de Aguas, Nalda, Ocón, Pradejón, Préjano, Quel, Ribafrecha, Rincón de Soto, Santa Engrancia de Jubera, Santa Eulalia Bajera, Tudelilla, Villamediana de Iregua, Villarroya and Logroño

== Authorized Grape Varieties ==
Wine bearing the Vino de la Tierra Valles de Sadacia indication on their labels must be made with at least 85% grapes of the white varieties Moscatel de Grano Menudo or Moscatel de Alejandría. Viura, Malvasia and Garnacha blanca are also allowed.

== Technical requirements ==
- Maximum planting density: minimum 2,850 vines/hectare
- Maximum grape production: 10,000 kg/hectare
- Maximum yield: 70% (70 L must per 100 kg grapes)
