= Cidacos =

Spanish river

Coordinates: 42°12′38″N 2°12′21″W

Cidacos River
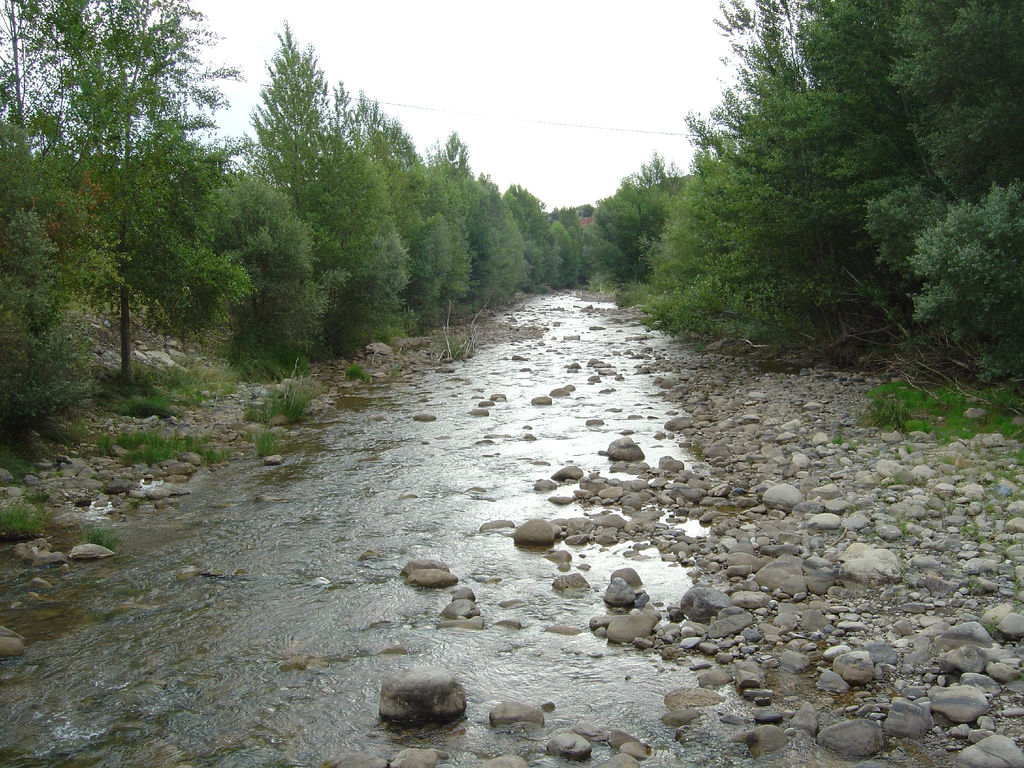
- Cidacos river in Arnedo (La Rioja).

- Cidacos river location in the Ebro basin
- Native name: Río Cidacos (Spanish)

Location
- Country: Spain
- Region: Castile and León Soria, La Rioja

Physical characteristics
- Source
  - location: Puerto de Oncala
  - elevation: 1,425 m (4,675 ft)
- Mouth
  - location: Ebro
  - elevation: 290 m (950 ft)
- Length: 82.8 km (51.4 mi)
- Basin size: 696 km^{2} (269 sq mi)
- Discharge
  - average: 2.7 m^{3}/s (95 cu ft/s)

Basin features
- Progression: Ebro→ Balearic Sea

The Cidacos River is a tributary of the Spanish Ebro River. Its source is Los Campos, in Soria, and it flows for 77 kilometres (48 mi) until it reaches the Ebro at Calahorra, La Rioja.

It flows through or past various towns like Villar del Río, Yanguas, Enciso, Peroblasco, Arnedillo, Santa Eulalia Somera, and Bajera, Herce, Arnedo, Quel, Autol, and Calahorra. The river is used for irrigation purposes and is often dried up near Calahorra.

== Gallery ==
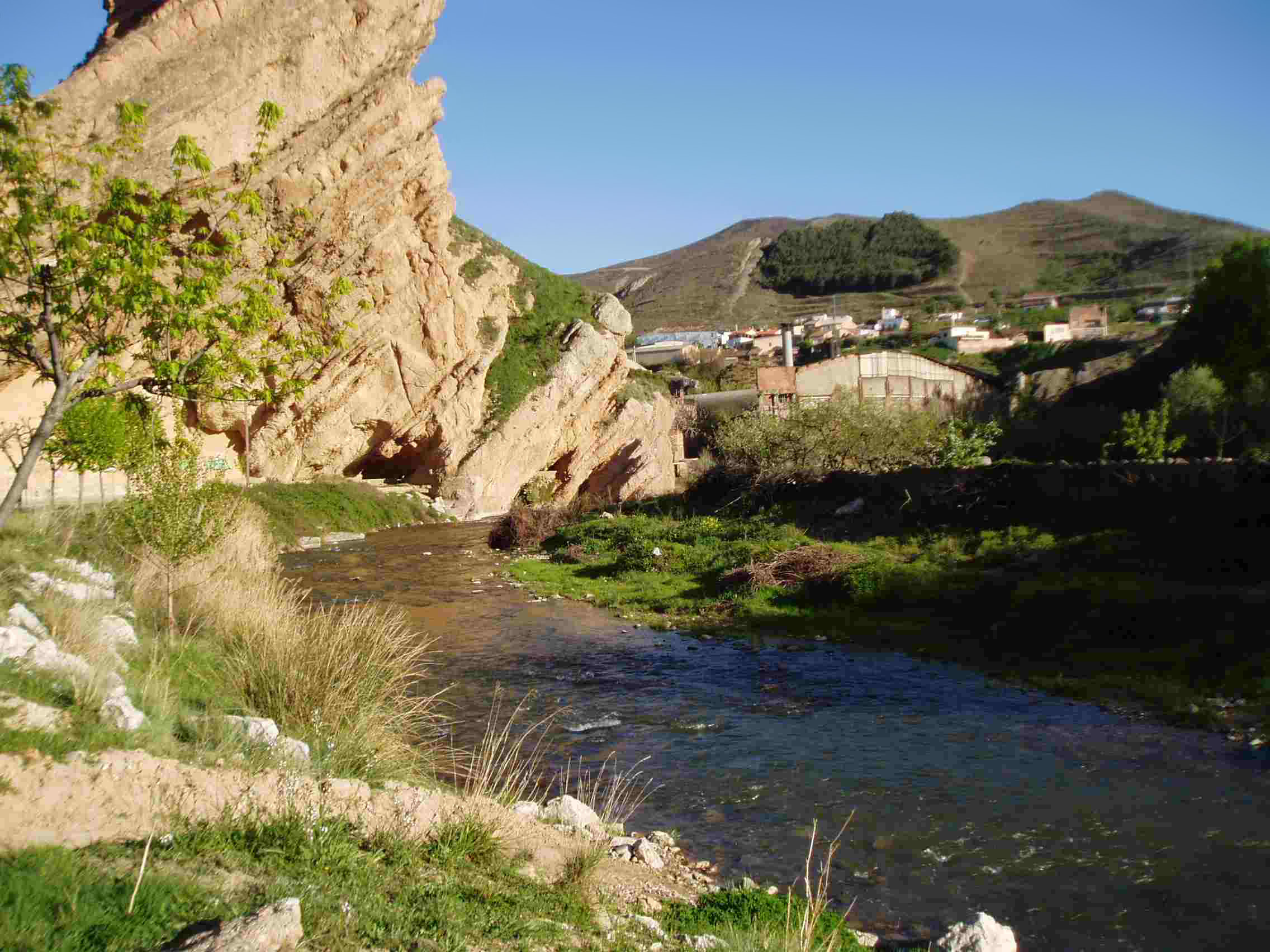
The Cidacos near Autol

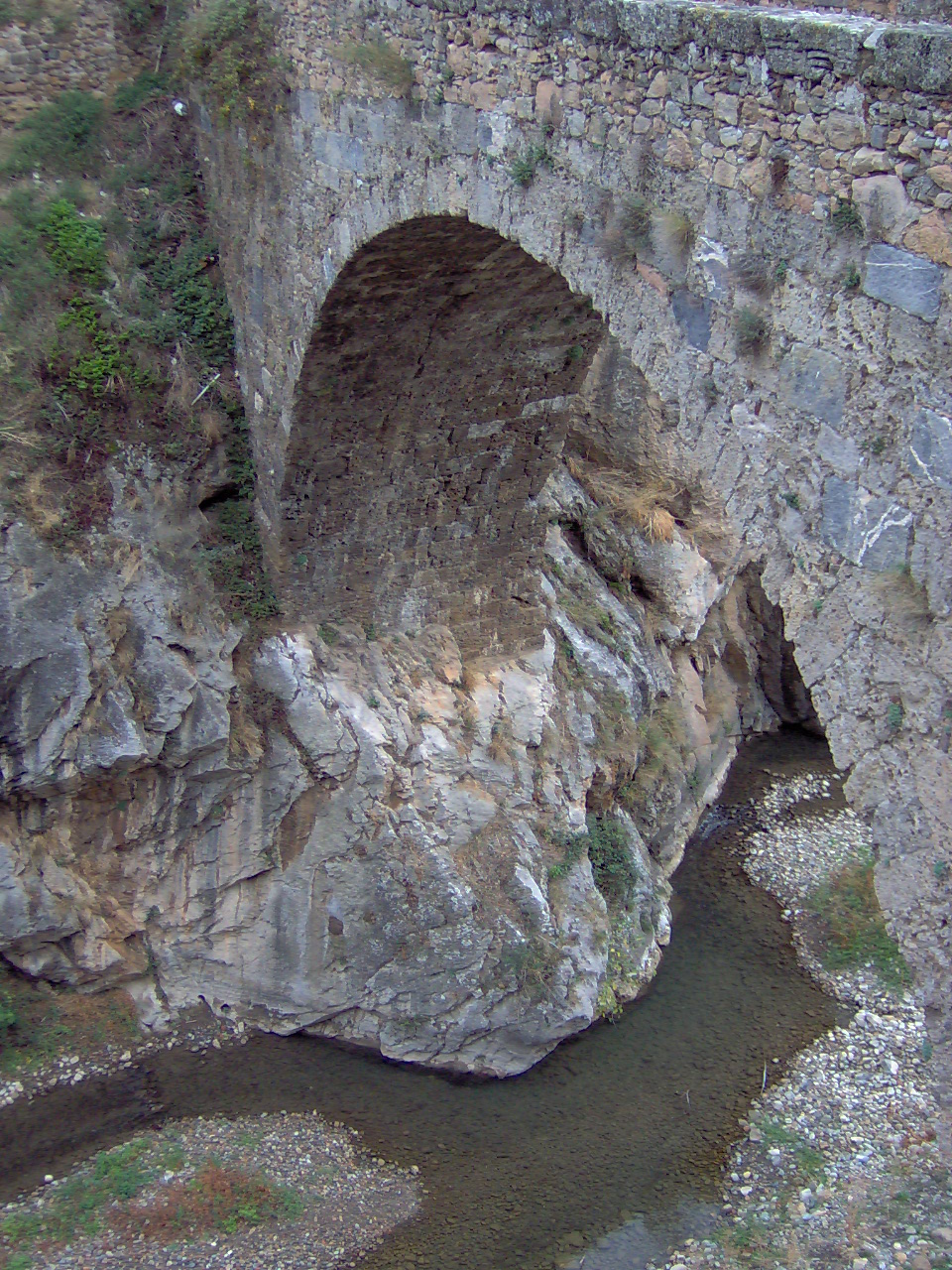
Bridge over the Cidacos near Arnedillo

== See also ==
- List of rivers of Spain
