= Préjano =

- Municipality
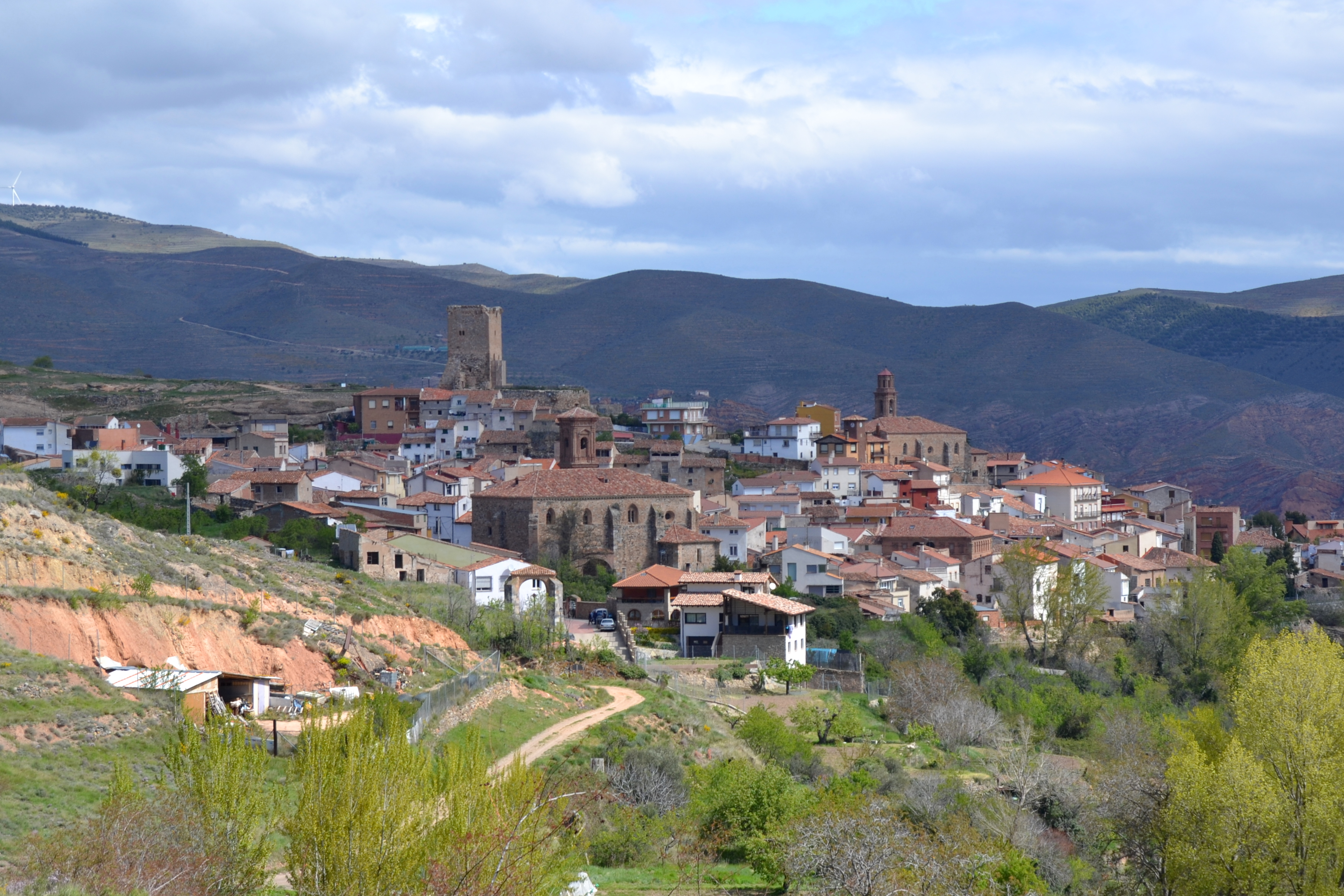
- Préjano, general view

- Location of Préjano within La Rioja
- Coordinates: 42°11′10″N 2°10′48″W
- Country: Spain
- Autonomous community: La Rioja
- Comarca: Arnedo

Government
  - Mayor: Eduardo Ruiz Cubillo (PSOE)

Area
  - Total: 42.40 km^{2} (16.37 sq mi)
- Elevation: 710 m (2,330 ft)

Population (2025-01-01)
  - Total: 206
  - Density: 4.86/km^{2} (12.6/sq mi)
- Demonym(s): Spanish: prejanero, prejanera
- Time zone: UTC+1 (CET)
  - Summer (DST): UTC+2 (CEST)
- Postal code: 26589

Préjano is a village and municipality of la Rioja Baja, in the autonomous community of La Rioja, Spain. It is located on the left bank of the Ruesca river, tributary of the Cidacos. It is a former mining village, nowadays its inhabitants are supported by agriculture or work in industry of the nearby Arnedo, capital of the comarca.

== Demography ==
As of January 2010 the population of the municipality was 237 inhabitants, 128 men and 109 women.

== Places of interest ==
- Castle of Préjano, 15th-century tower with a pentagonal base reinforced by inclined walls.
- Hermitage of Santo Cristo de la Canal
- Church of San Miguel, Préjano, from the 16th century
- Parish church of Saint Esteban
- Trujal, the most ancient olive oil press of La Rioja, still in use by the local cooperative.
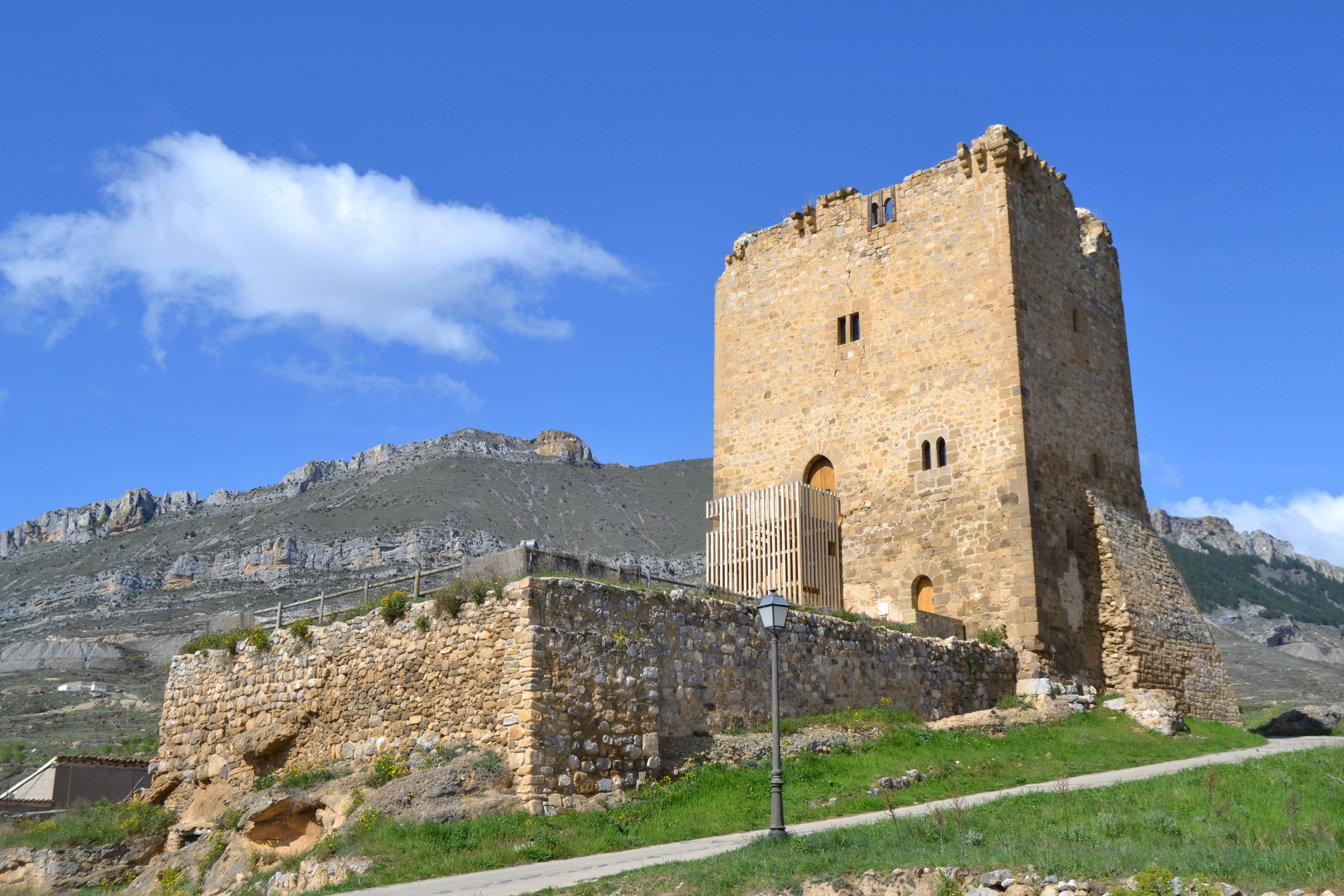
Castle of Préjano after its restoration

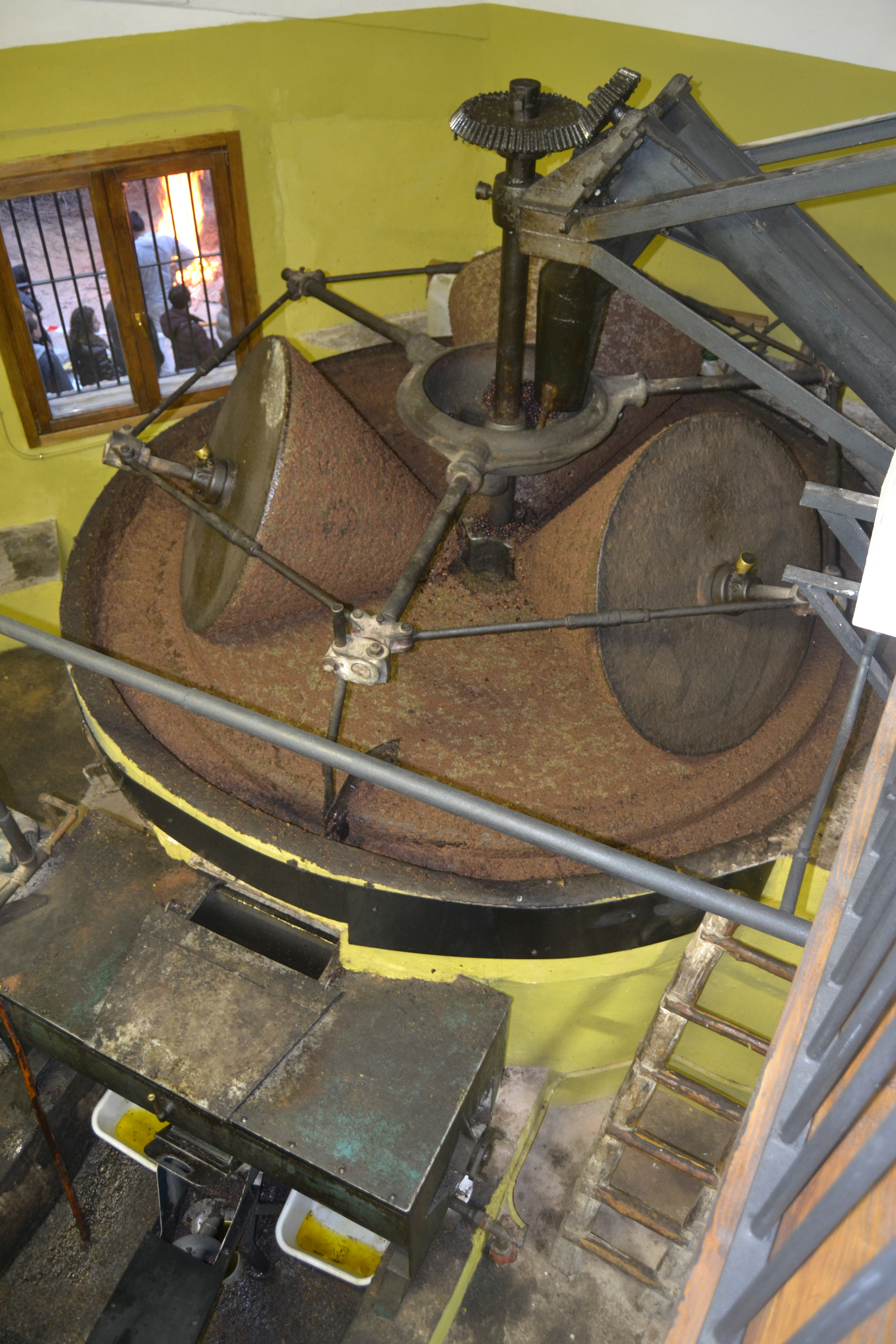
Trujal (olive press)
