= Autol =

- Municipality
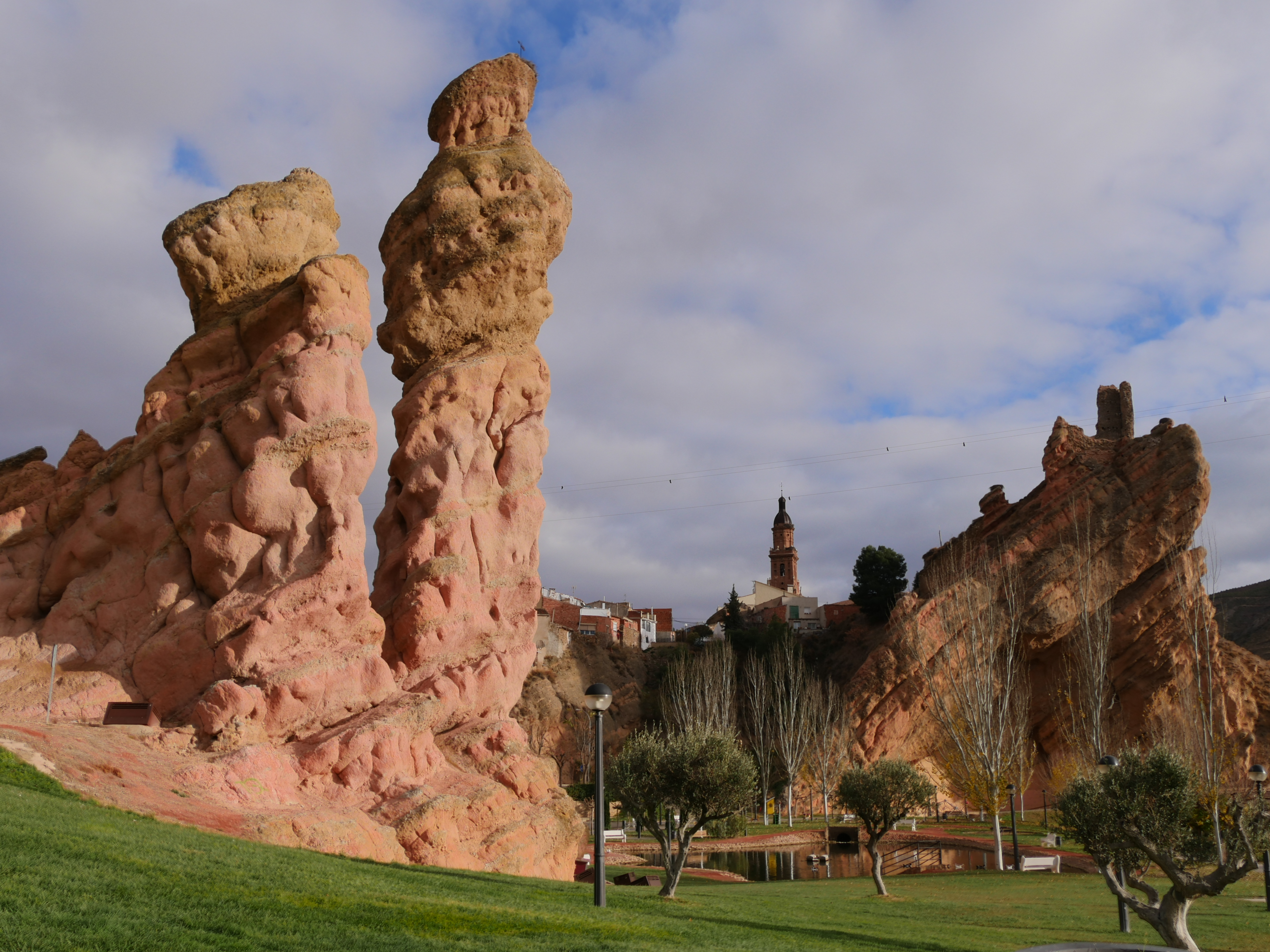
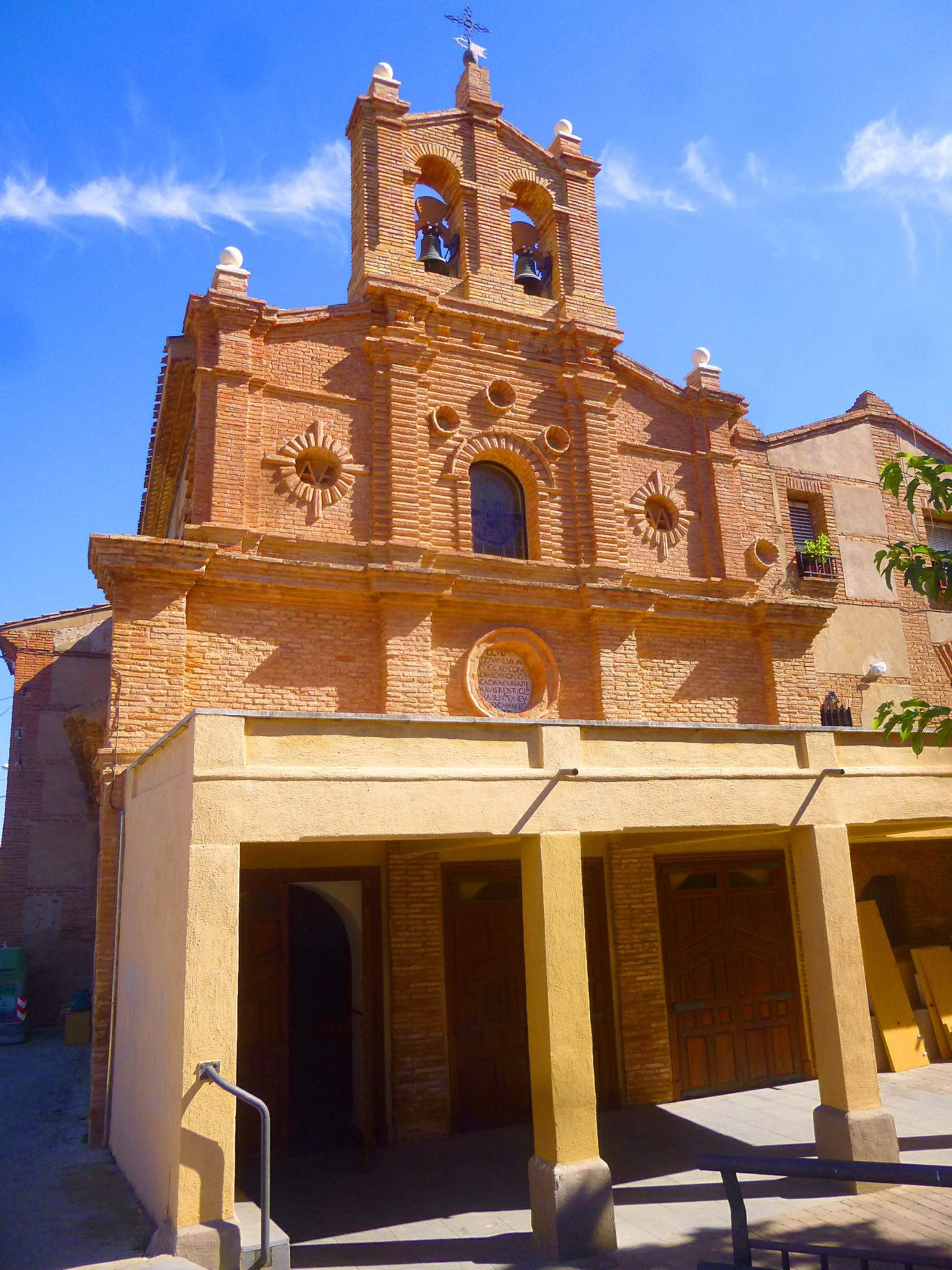
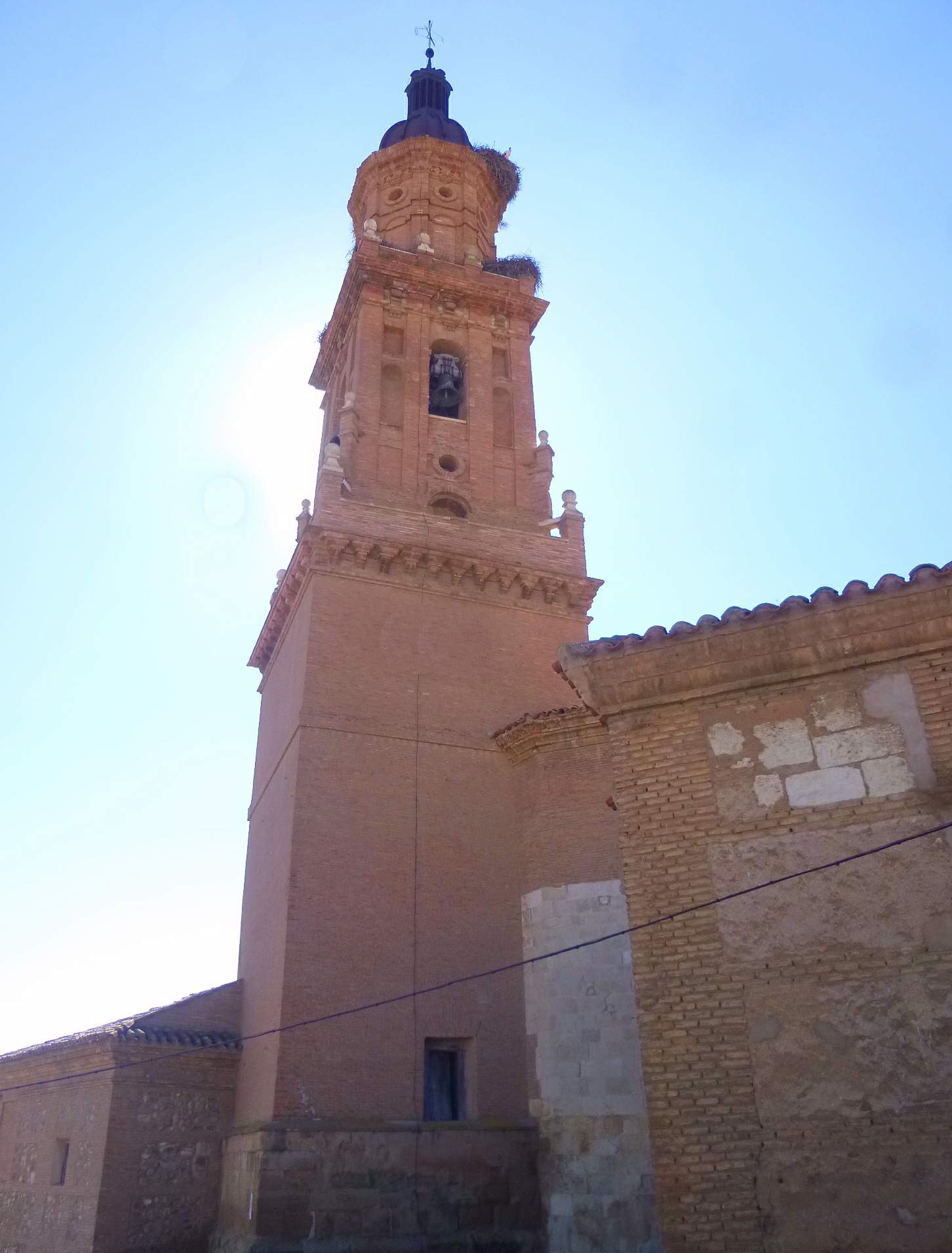
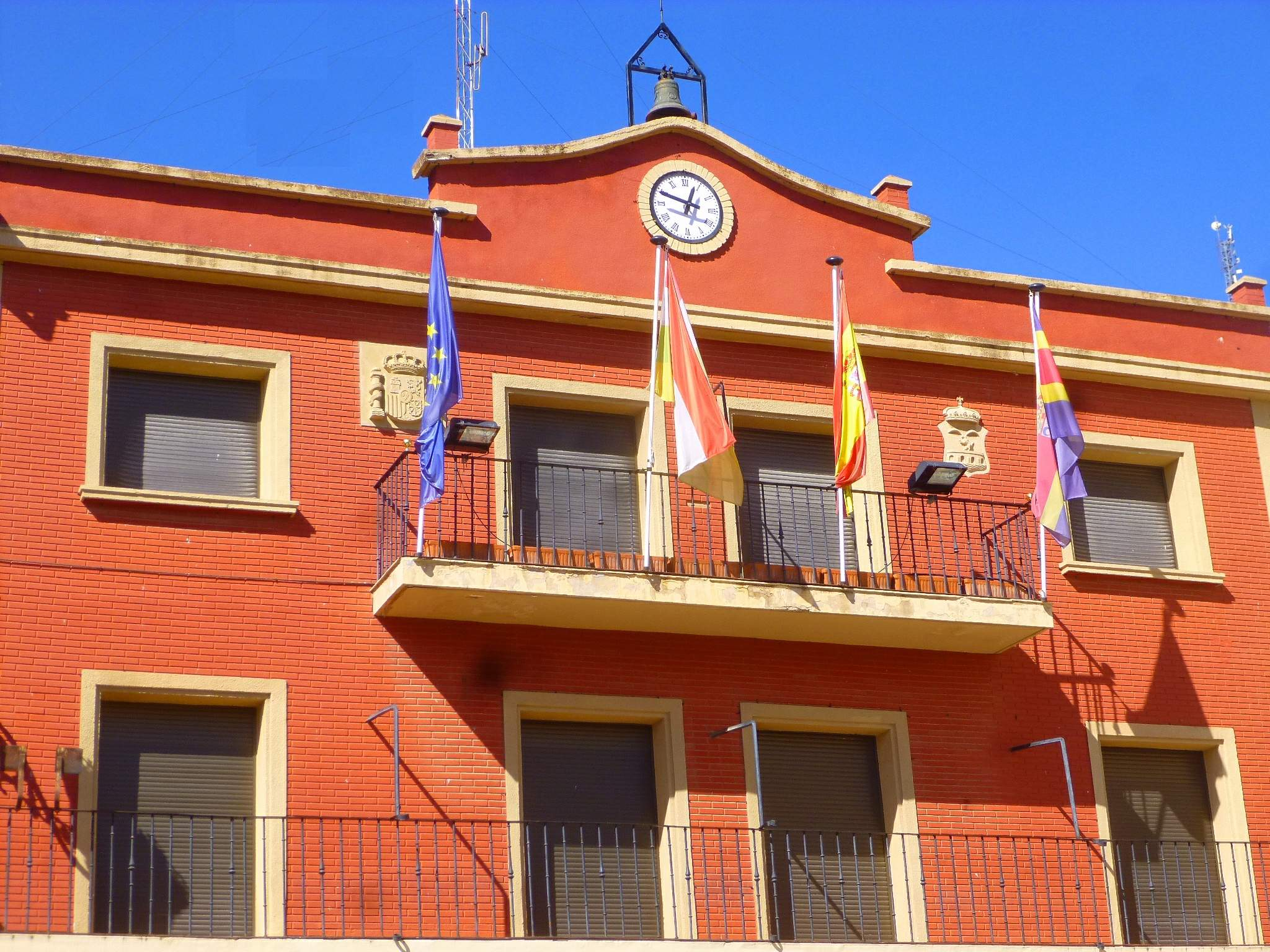
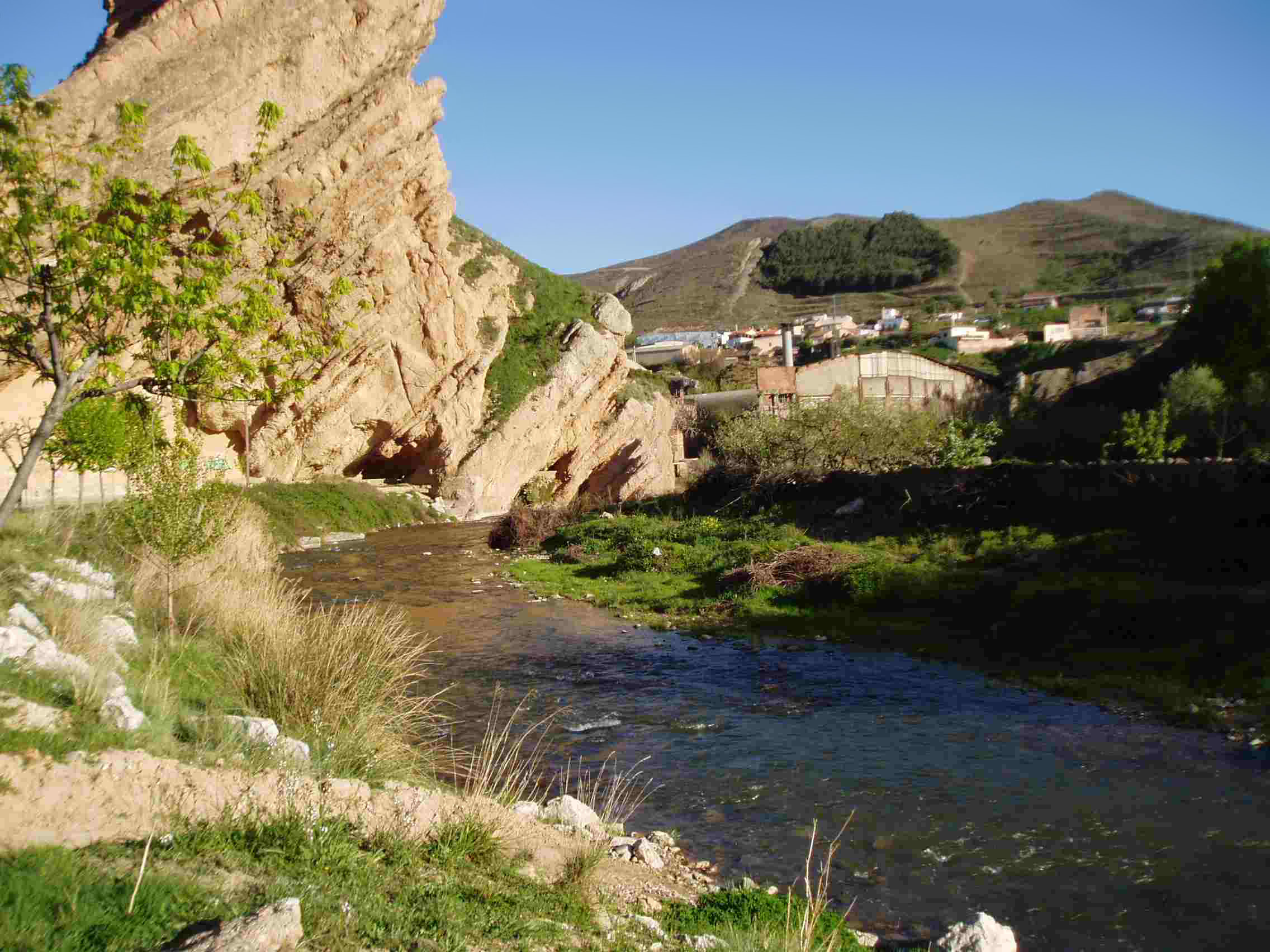

- Coat of arms

- Location within La Rioja, Spain Location within Spain
- Coordinates: 42°12′50″N 2°00′25″W
- Country: Spain
- Autonomous community: La Rioja
- Comarca: Arnedo

Government
  - Mayor: Catalina Bastida de Miguel (PP)

Area
  - Total: 85.28 km^{2} (32.93 sq mi)
- Elevation: 1,061 m (3,481 ft)

Population (2025-01-01)
  - Total: 4,958
- Demonym(s): autoleño, ña; catón, na
- Postal code: 26560
- Website: www.autol.org

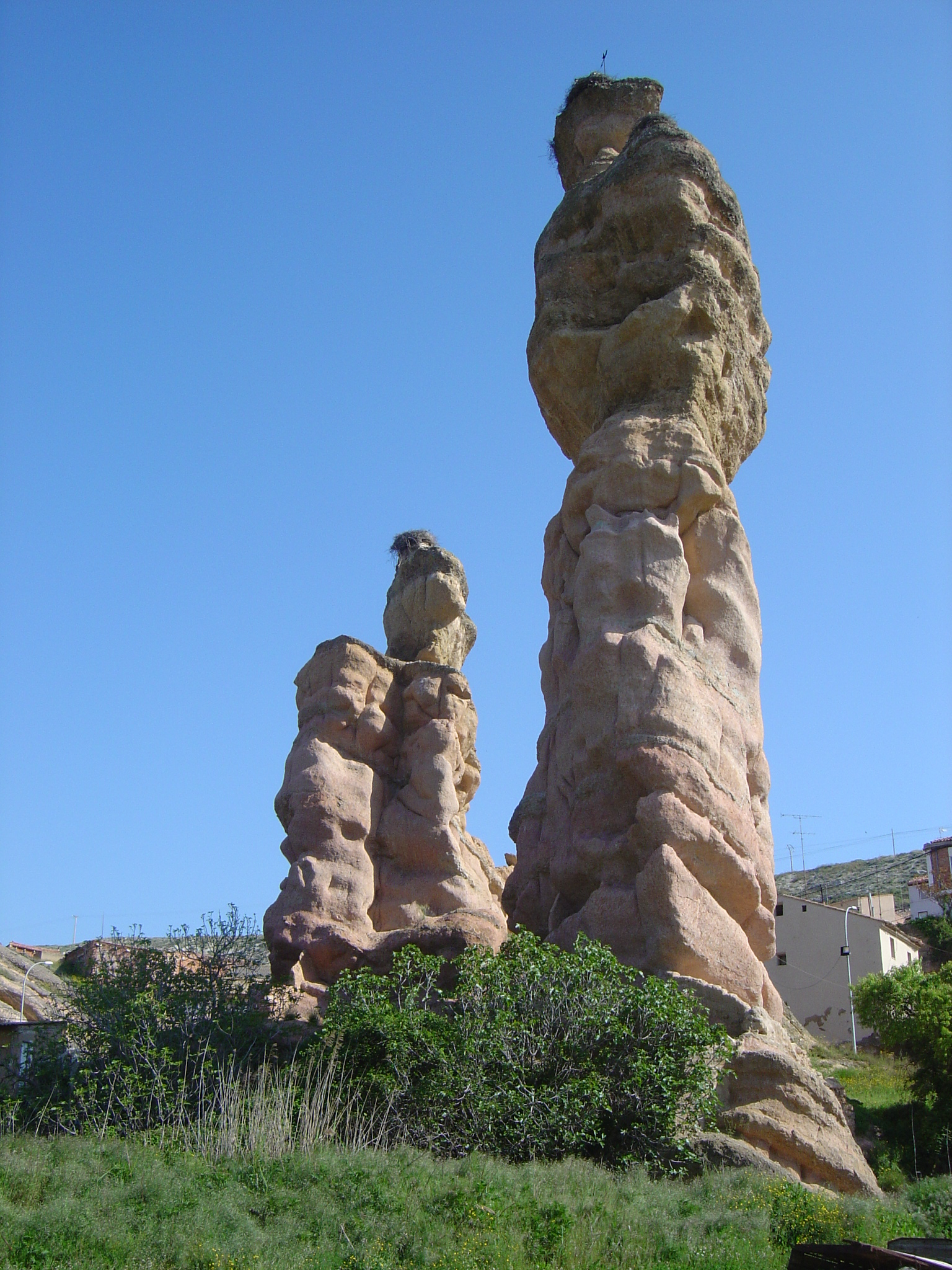
Picuezo and Picueza rock formations in Autol

Autol is a village in the province and autonomous community of La Rioja, Spain. River Cidacos flows by the town. There are original rock formations close to Autol. The municipality covers an area of 85.28 square kilometres (32.93 sq mi) and as of 2011 had a population of 4458 people.

== Notable people ==
- Abilio Martínez Varea: Bishop of Osma-Soria.
- Javier Herreros: Spanish professional footballer.
