= Muro de Aguas =

- Municipality
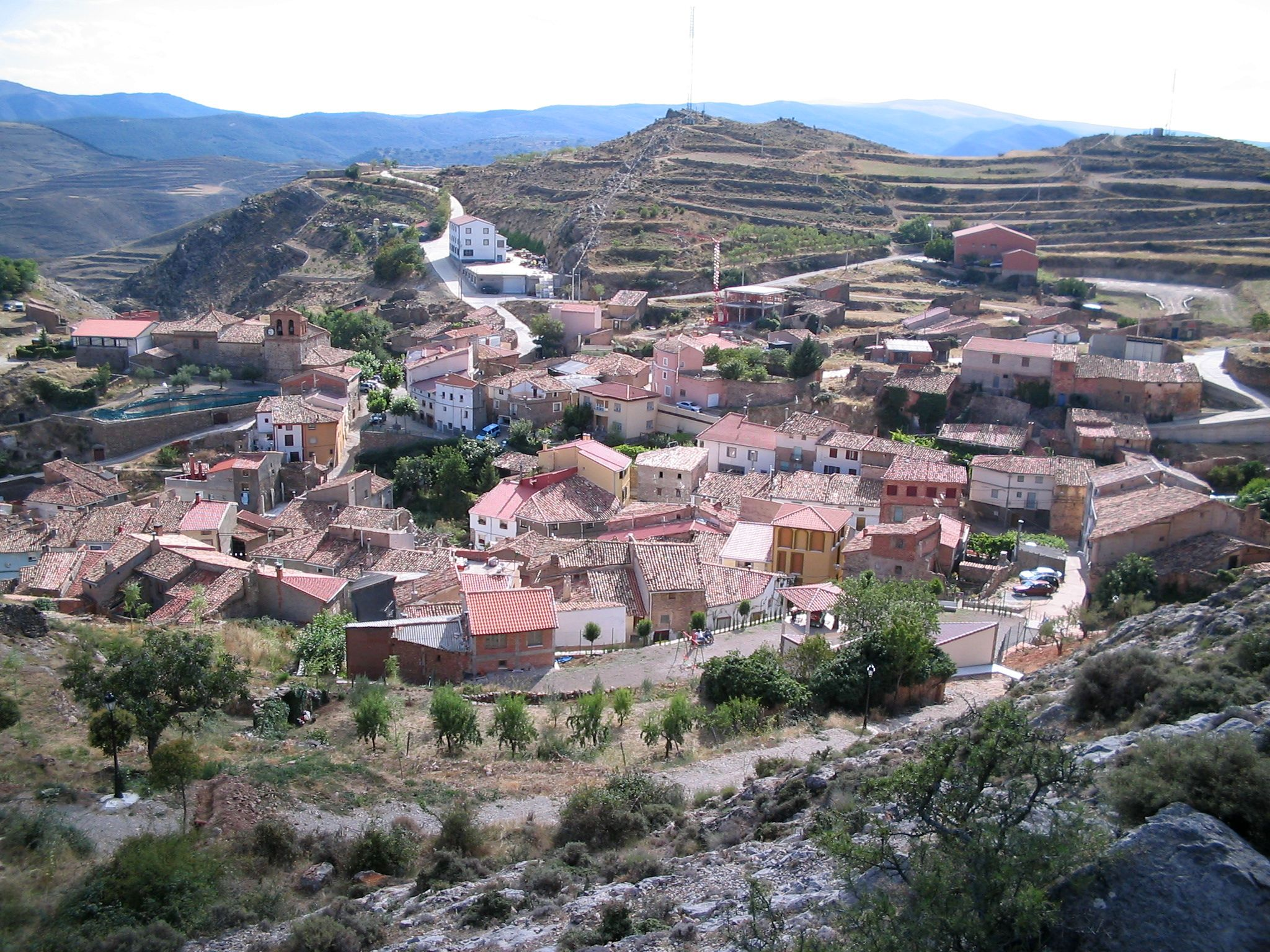

- Location within Rioja Baja (La Rioja).

- Location in La Rioja Location in Spain
- Coordinates: 42°8′3″N 2°6′38″W
- Country: Spain
- Autonomous community: La Rioja
- Comarca: Arnedo

Government
  - Mayor: Pedro Juan Sanz Martínez (PP)

Area
  - Total: 30.9 km^{2} (11.9 sq mi)
- Elevation: 891 m (2,923 ft)

Population (2025-01-01)
  - Total: 57
  - Density: 1.8/km^{2} (4.8/sq mi)
- Time zone: UTC+1 (CET)
  - Summer (DST): UTC+2 (CEST)
- Website: Official website

Muro de Aguas is a small municipality (pop. 61 (2007)) in the southern part of La Rioja, Spain, near Arnedo.

== See also ==
- La Rioja (Spain)
- List of municipalities in La Rioja
