= Castle of Arnedo =

Castle in La Rioja, Spain

Coordinates: 42°13′44″N 2°05′47″W

- Castillo de Arnedo (Spanish)
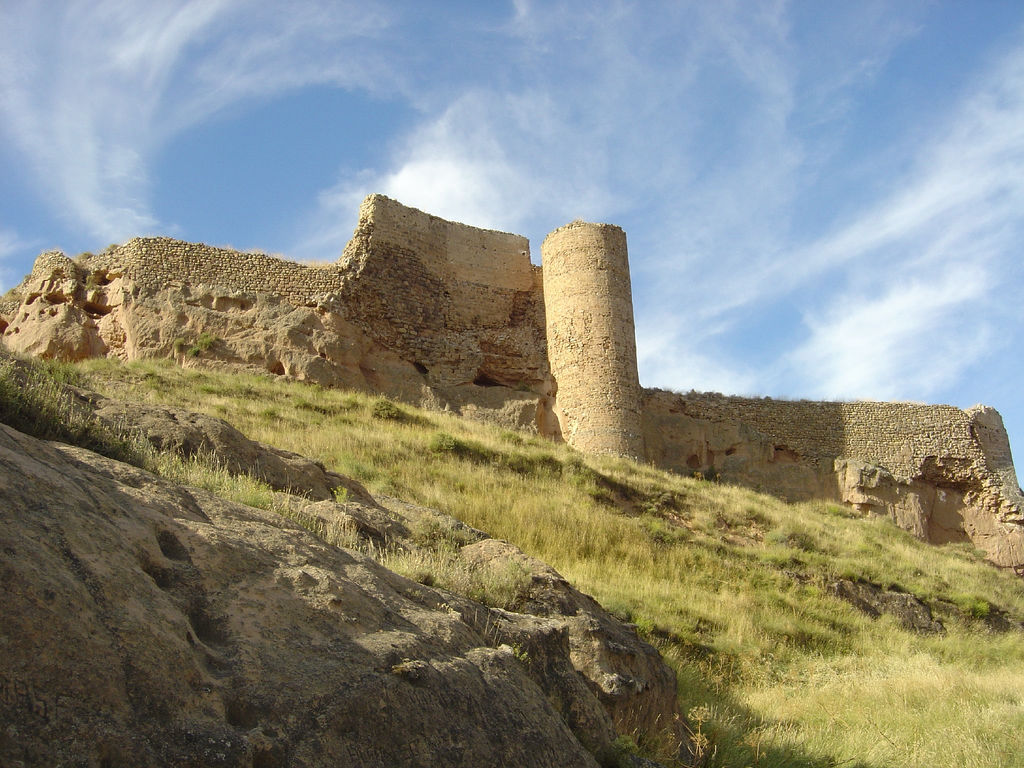
- View of the castle
- Interactive map of Castle of Arnedo
- Location: Arnedo, Spain

History
- Built: Of Muslim origin, built over Roman remains (9th century)

The Castle of Arnedo is a fortification located in Arnedo in the autonomous community of La Rioja, Spain. It overlooks the city and the course of the Cidacos River. The first defensive structures built on the hill, where the castle is located now, date from ancient Roman times. After the Muslim invasion, the conquerors built a new defensive fortress—dated to the 9th century—over the existing remains. It was the most important castle in the region during the Middle Ages, and it changed hands between Muslims and Christians several times during the Reconquista.

== Bibliography ==
- Calatayud Fernández, Elena (1990). "Castillo de Quel" (PDF). Brocar: Cuadernos de investigación histórica (in Spanish) (16): 71–84. ISSN 1885-8309.
- Fernández de Bobadilla, Fernando (1949). "Apuntes para la historia del castillo de Arnedo" (PDF). Berceo (in Spanish) (10): 45–60. ISSN 0210-8550.
- Sáenz Rodríguez, Minerva (1994). "Configuración urbana del casco antiguo de la ciudad de Arnedo" (PDF). Historia del arte en La Rioja Baja, ámbito y vínculos artísticos: La Rioja, 8, 9 y 10 de octubre de 1993: IV Jornadas de Arte Riojano (in Spanish): 15–30. ISBN 84-87252-36-2.
