= Villarroya =

Villarroya may refer to:

The name of several places in Spain:

- Villarroya, La Rioja, a municipality in the province and autonomous community of La Rioja in northern Spain
- Villarroya de los Pinares, a municipality in the province of Teruel, Aragon
- Villarroya de la Sierra, a municipality in the province of Zaragoza, Aragon
- Villarroya del Campo, a municipality in the province of Zaragoza, Aragon

People:

- Francisco Villarroya (born 1966), retired Spanish footballer
- Miguel Ángel Villarroya Vilalta (born 1957), Spanish general
