= Grávalos =

- Municipality
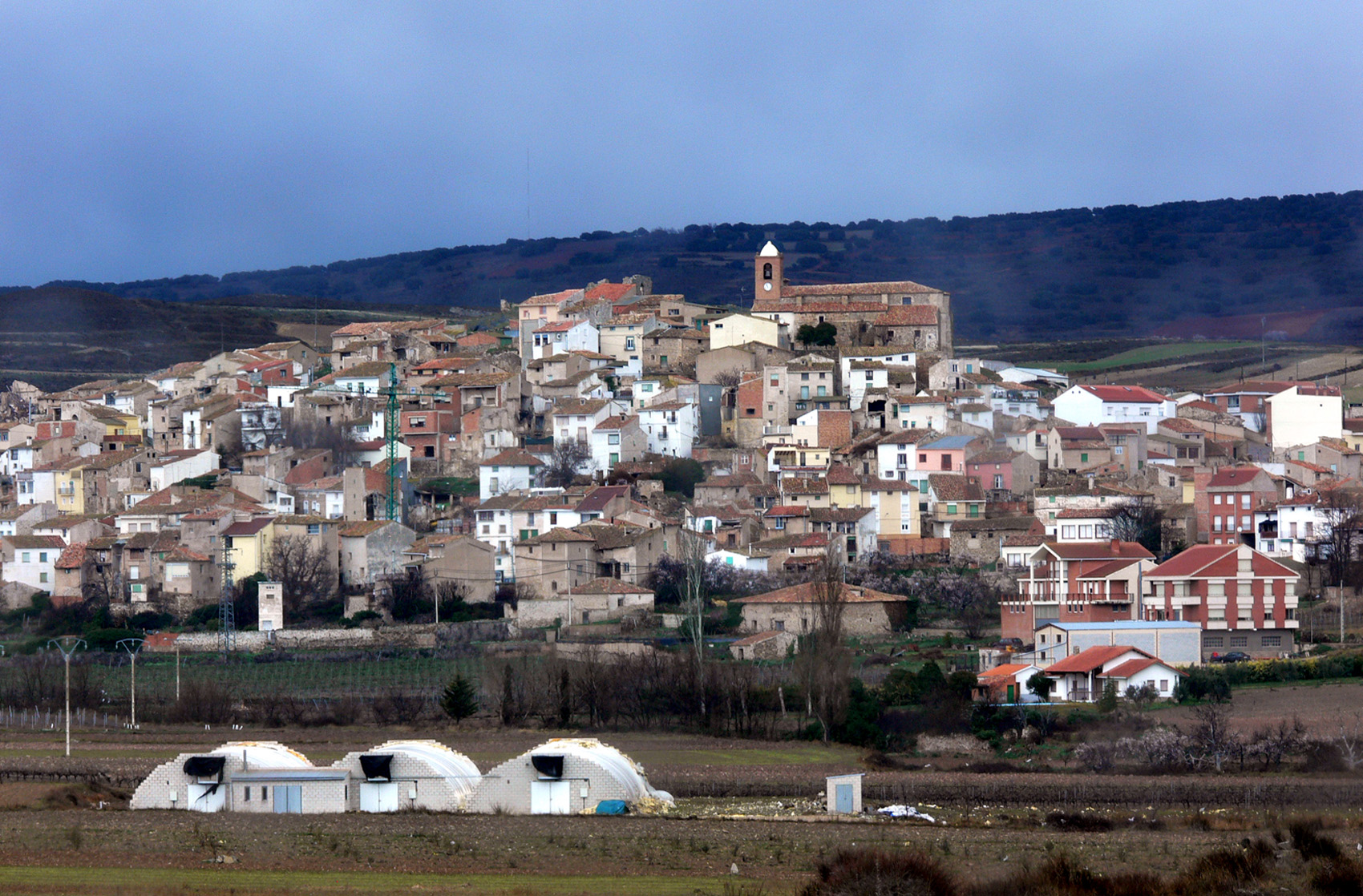
- Vista de Grávalos

- Location in La Rioja Location in Spain
- Coordinates: 42°6′29″N 2°0′3″W
- Autonomous community: La Rioja
- Province: La Rioja
- Comarca: Comarca de Cervera

Government
  - Alcalde: José Jorge Abad Sáez (PP)

Area
  - Total: 31.0 km^{2} (12.0 sq mi)
- Elevation: 750 m (2,460 ft)

Population (2025-01-01)
  - Total: 196
  - Density: 6.32/km^{2} (16.4/sq mi)
- Demonym(s): gravalense; gravaleño, ña
- Postal Code: 26587
- Website: www.gravalos.org

Grávalos is a village in the province and autonomous community of La Rioja, Spain. It's 72 km. from the city of Logroño. Traditional tales talk about Gravalos like belong to Arnedo. It was in first times a Roman villa. In medieval ages belonged to Arnedo until 1669. In that year Gravalos become an independent municipality, but still remained as a possession of the Arnedo's Church. The municipality covers an area of 31.91 square kilometres (12.32 sq mi) and as of 2011 had a population of 234 people.

== Interesting places ==
- Parish church of Santa María de la Antigua, 16th-century, Three naves of different altitude.
