= Yanguas de Eresma =

- Municipality
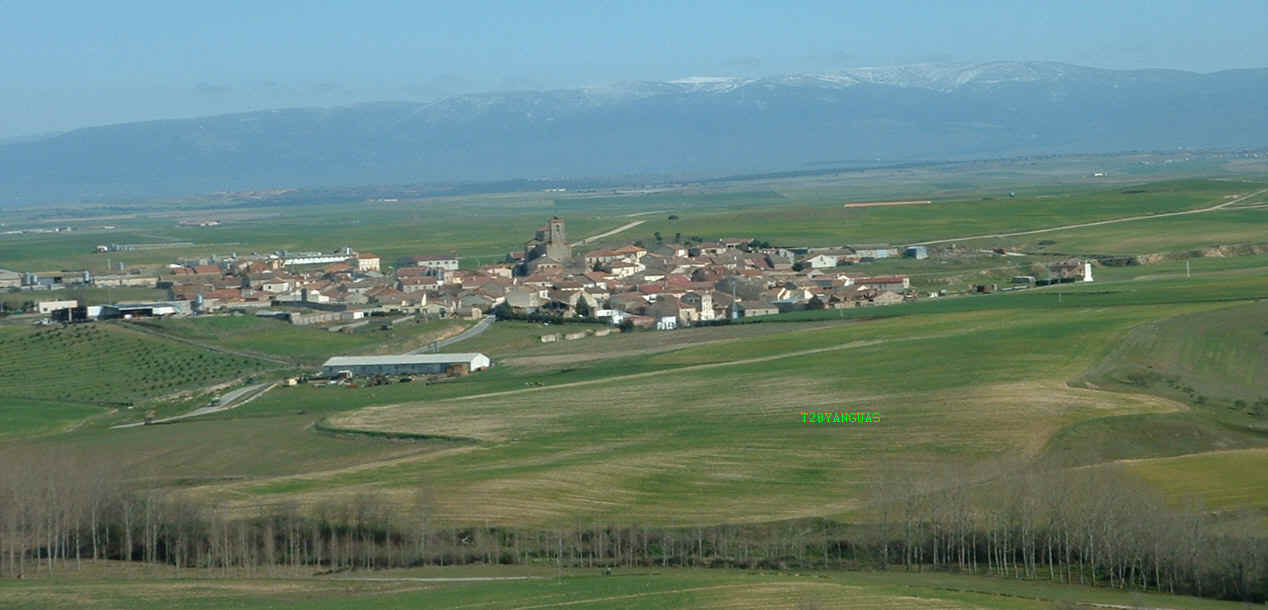
- View of Yanguas de Eresma

- Location in Spain. Yanguas de Eresma (Spain)
- Coordinates: 41°04′21″N 4°14′24″W
- Country: Spain
- Autonomous community: Castile and León
- Province: Segovia
- Municipality: Yanguas de Eresma

Area
  - Total: 24.28 km^{2} (9.37 sq mi)
- Elevation: 897 m (2,943 ft)

Population (2025-01-01)
  - Total: 117
  - Density: 4.82/km^{2} (12.5/sq mi)
- Time zone: UTC+1 (CET)
  - Summer (DST): UTC+2 (CEST)
- Website: Official website

Yanguas de Eresma is a municipality located in the province of Segovia, Castile and León, Spain. According to the 2004 census (INE), the municipality had a population of 196 inhabitants.

== See also ==
- Yanguas – a different community in a nearby province
