= Munilla =

- Municipality
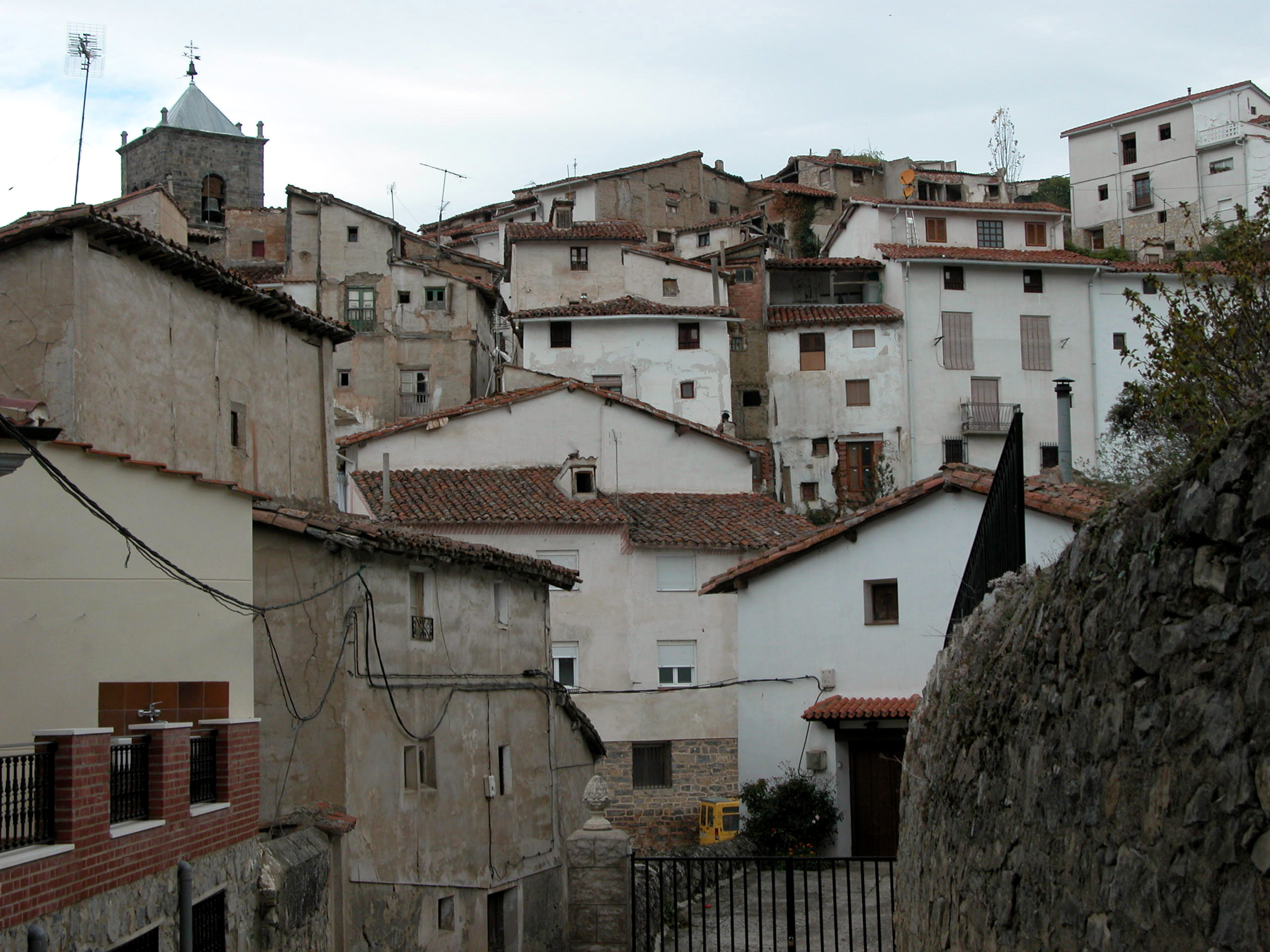
- Skyline of Munilla

- Location within La Rioja, Spain Location within Spain
- Coordinates: 42°11′19″N 2°17′42″W
- Country: Spain
- Autonomous community: La Rioja
- Comarca: Comarca de Arnedo

Government
  - Mayor: Claudio García Lasota (PP)

Area
  - Total: 54.19 km^{2} (20.92 sq mi)
- Elevation: 790 m (2,590 ft)

Population (2025-01-01)
  - Total: 93
- Postal code: 26586
- Website: Official website

Munilla is a village in the province and autonomous community of La Rioja, Spain. The municipality covers an area of 54.19 square kilometres (20.92 sq mi) and as of 2011 had a population of 124 people.
