= Bergasa =

- Municipality
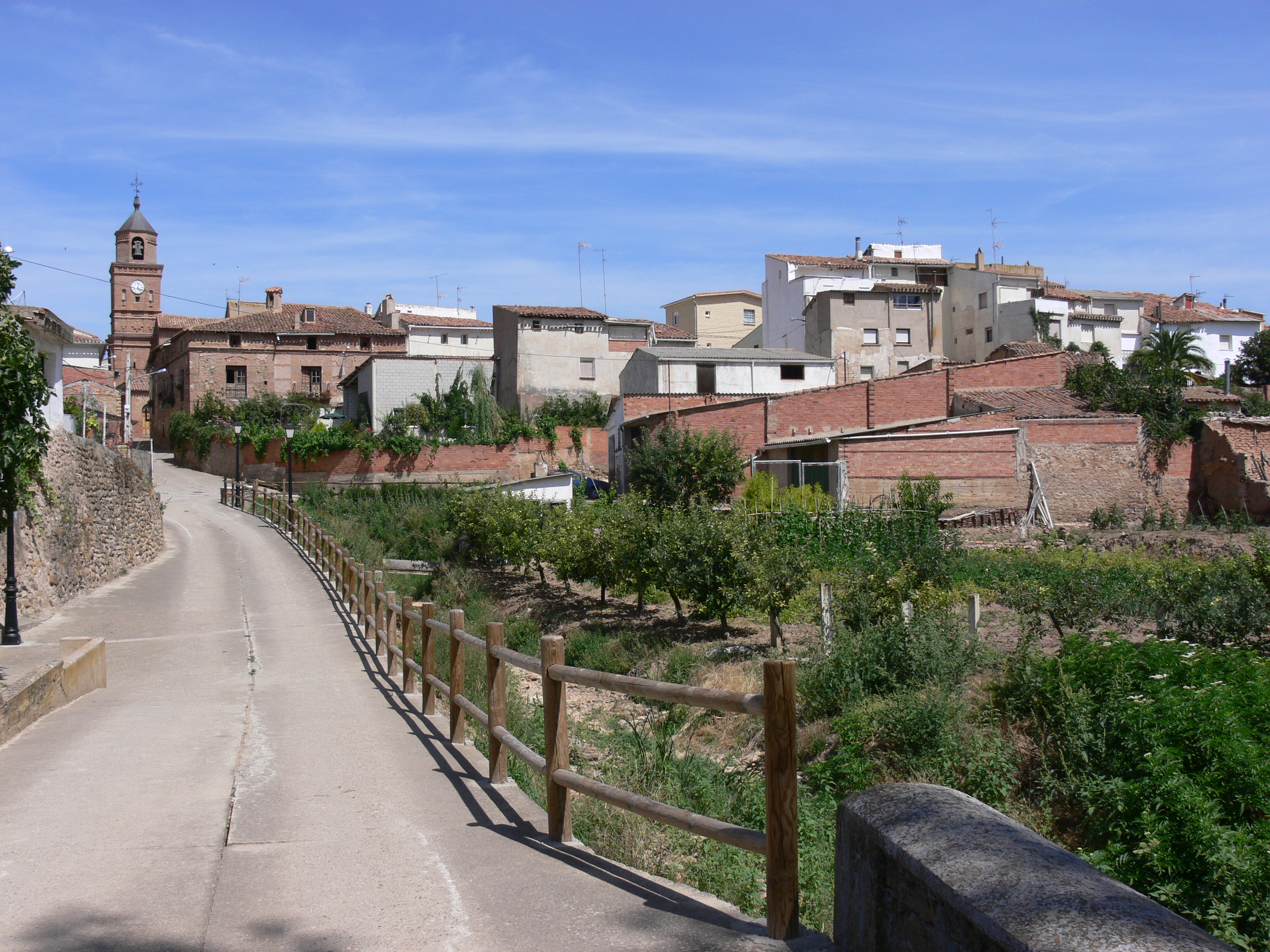
- Skyline of Bergasa

- Location within La Rioja, Spain Location within Spain
- Coordinates: 42°15′09″N 2°07′50″W
- Country: Spain
- Autonomous community: La Rioja
- Comarca: Arnedo

Government
  - Mayor: Ángel Ferrero Chimeno (PP)

Area
  - Total: 27.09 km^{2} (10.46 sq mi)
- Elevation: 648 m (2,126 ft)

Population (2025-01-01)
  - Total: 172
- Demonym(s): bergaseño, ña
- Postal code: 26588
- Website: www.aytobergasa.org

Bergasa is a village in the province and autonomous community of La Rioja, Spain. The municipality covers an area of 27.09 square kilometres (10.46 sq mi) and as of 2011 had a population of 155 people.
