= Herce =

- Municipality
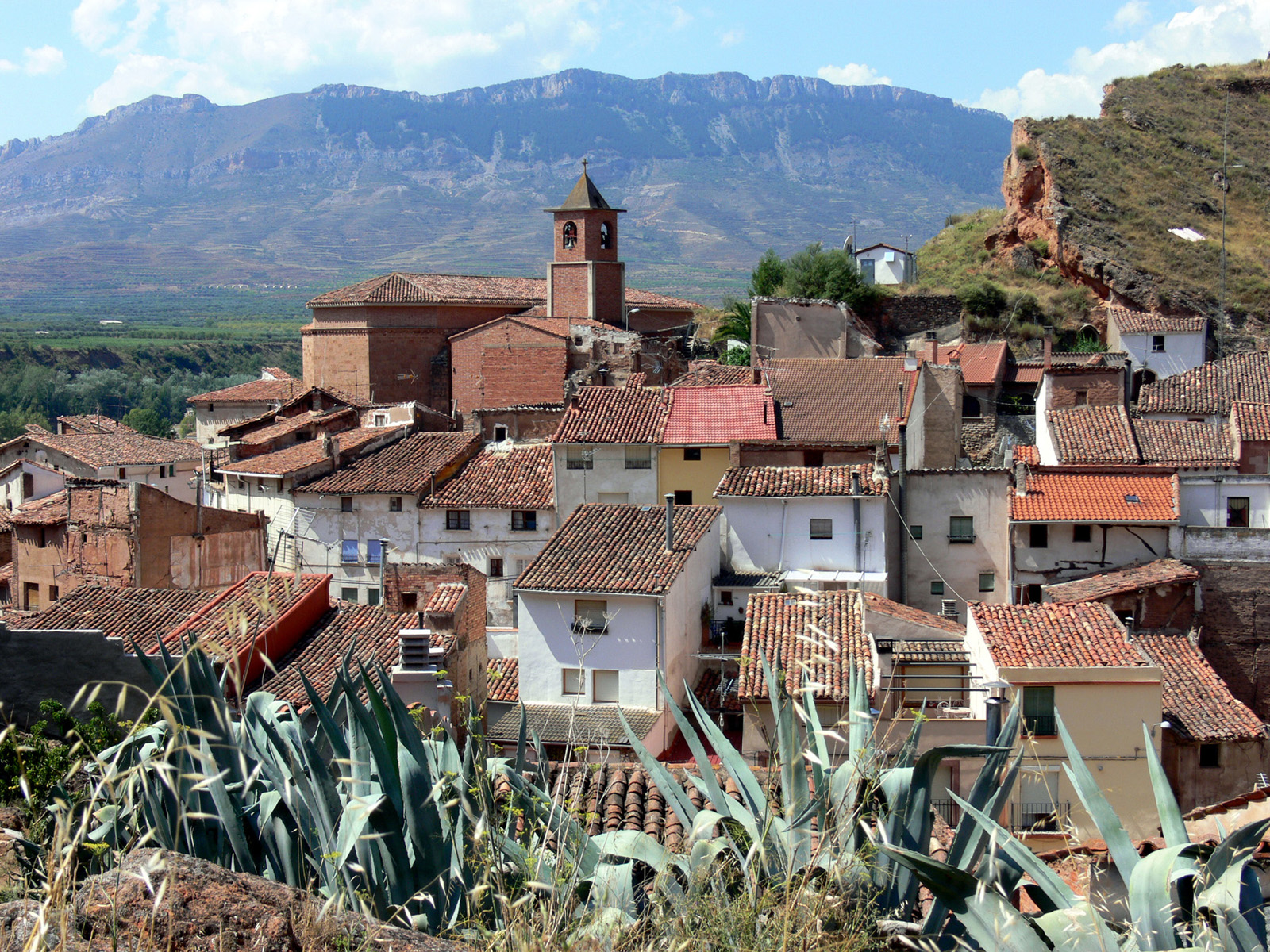

- Coat of arms

- Location within La Rioja.

- Location in La Rioja Location in Spain
- Coordinates: 42°12′51″N 2°09′53″W
- Country: Spain
- Autonomous community: La Rioja
- Comarca: Comarca de Arnedo

Area
  - Total: 17.8 km^{2} (6.9 sq mi)
- Elevation: 593 m (1,946 ft)

Population (2025-01-01)
  - Total: 340
- Demonym(s): cebollero, ra
- Time zone: UTC+1 (CET)
  - Summer (DST): UTC+2 (CET)
- Postal code: 26584
- Website: Official website

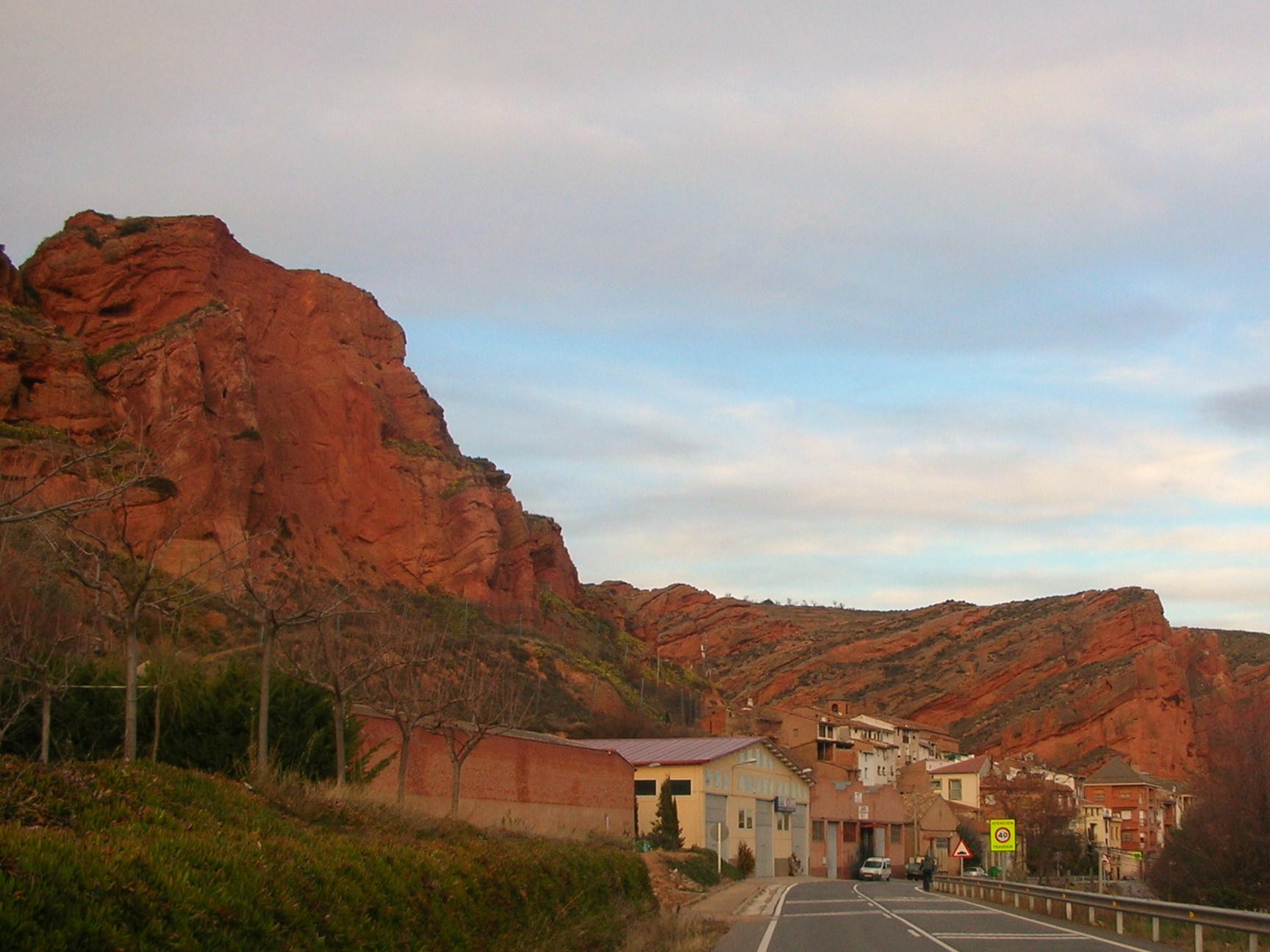
View of Herce and the striking red rock cliffs towering above the town

Herce is a town and municipality in La Rioja province in northern Spain.
