= Javier Herreros =

Spanish footballer

Javi Herreros
Personal information
- Full name: Javier Herreros Gorría
- Date of birth: 18 December 1984 (age 41)
- Place of birth: Logroño, Spain
- Height: 1.83 m (6 ft 0 in)
- Position: Centre back

Youth career
- 1999–2002: Osasuna

Senior career*
Years	Team	Apps	(Gls)
2002–2005	Osasuna B	41	(0)
2006	Peralta	13	(0)
2006–2009	Murcia B		
2009	Murcia	1	(0)
2009–2010	Córdoba	11	(0)
2010–2011	Melilla	33	(1)
2011–2012	Albacete	10	(0)
2012–2013	Real Unión	23	(1)
2013–2015	UD Logroñés	40	(3)
2016	Izarra	10	(0)
2016–2017	SD Logroñés	15	(8)
2017–2019	Anguiano	44	(3)
Total		241	(16)
- * Club domestic league appearances and goals

Javier 'Javi' Herreros Gorría (born 18 December 1984 in Logroño, La Rioja) is a Spanish former professional footballer who played as a central defender.
