= Yanguas =

- Municipality
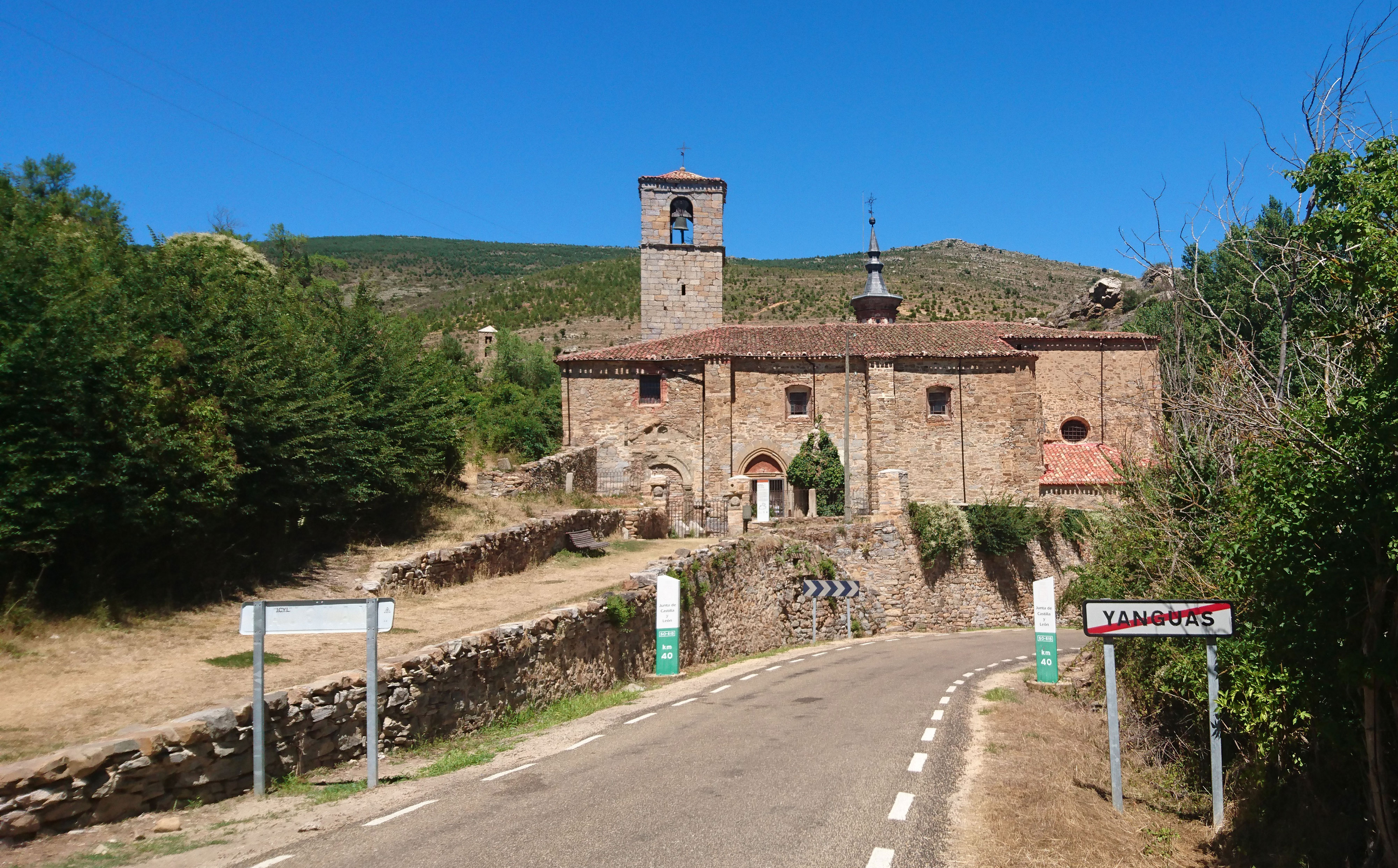
- Church of Santa María

- Coat of arms

- Location in Spain. Yanguas (Spain)
- Coordinates: 42°06′05″N 2°20′22″W
- Country: Spain
- Autonomous community: Castile and León
- Province: Soria
- Municipality: Yanguas

Area
  - Total: 54.29 km^{2} (20.96 sq mi)

Population (2025-01-01)
  - Total: 104
  - Density: 1.92/km^{2} (4.96/sq mi)
- Time zone: UTC+1 (CET)
  - Summer (DST): UTC+2 (CEST)
- Website: Official website

Yanguas is a municipality located in the province of Soria, Castile and León, Spain. According to the 2004 census (INE), the municipality had a population of 128 inhabitants. Cervantes in Don Quixote refers to the knight-errant's unfriendly encounter with "some Yanguesan muleteers driving Galician ponies."

== See also ==
- Yanguas de Eresma – a different community in a nearby province
