= Santa Eulalia Bajera =

- Municipality
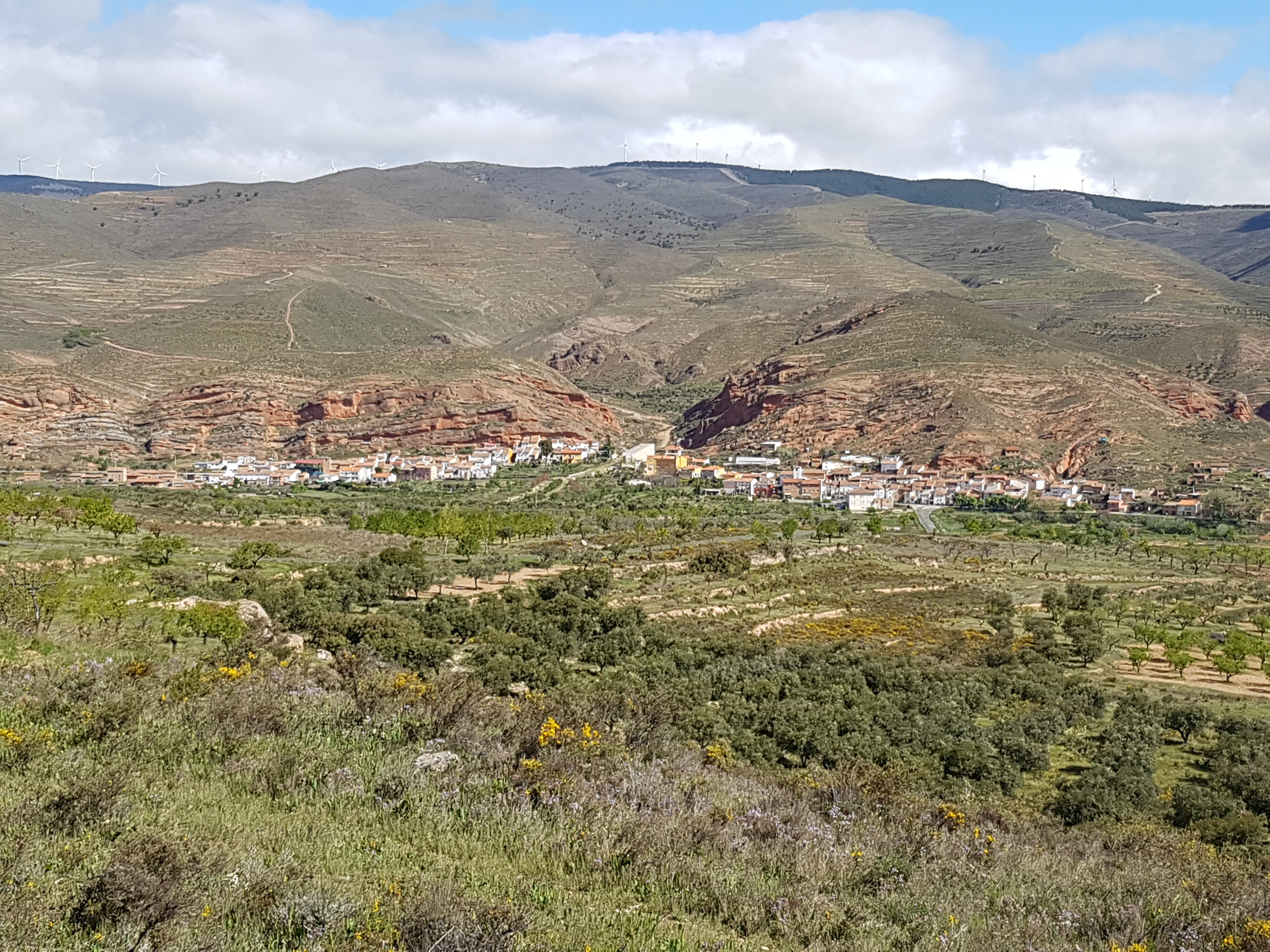
- Skyline of Santa Eulalia Bajera

- Location within La Rioja, Spain Location within Spain
- Coordinates: 42°12′35″N 2°11′26″W
- Country: Spain
- Autonomous community: La Rioja
- Comarca: Arnedo

Government
  - Mayor: Pedro Pascual de Blas (PP)

Area
  - Total: 8.43 km^{2} (3.25 sq mi)
- Elevation: 622 m (2,041 ft)

Population (2025-01-01)
  - Total: 112
- Postal code: 26585
- Website: Official website

Santa Eulalia Bajera is a village in the province and autonomous community of La Rioja, Spain. The municipality covers an area of 8.43 square kilometres (3.25 sq mi) and as of 2011 had a population of 130 people.
