= Arnedillo =

- Municipality
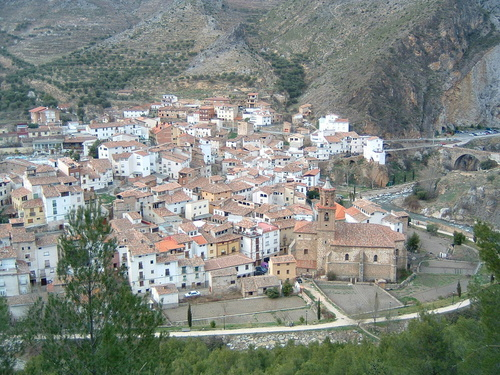
- View of Arnedillo

- Coat of arms

- Location within La Rioja, Spain Location within Spain
- Coordinates: 42°12′43″N 2°14′09″W
- Country: Spain
- Autonomous community: La Rioja
- Comarca: Arnedo

Government
  - Mayor: Pedro Antonio Montalvo Íñigo (PSOE)

Area
  - Total: 48.33 km^{2} (18.66 sq mi)
- Elevation: 1,057 m (3,468 ft)

Population (2025-01-01)
  - Total: 433
- Demonym: arnedillense
- Postal code: 26589
- Website: www.arnedillo.org

Arnedillo is a village in the province and autonomous community of La Rioja, Spain. It is crossed by the Cidacos River. The municipality covers an area of 48.33 square kilometres (18.66 sq mi) and as of 2011 had a population of 477 people.

Arnedillo is famous for its hot springs, which emerge on the surface after being filtered at a temperature of about 50°C (125°F). There is a hot springs resort known as "Balneario de Arnedillo", which attracts many people to this small village.

Another tourist attraction are the footprints of dinosaurs that can be found near Arnedillo.

== History ==
The origin of the village dates back to the Tenth Century.

=== Smoke procession ===
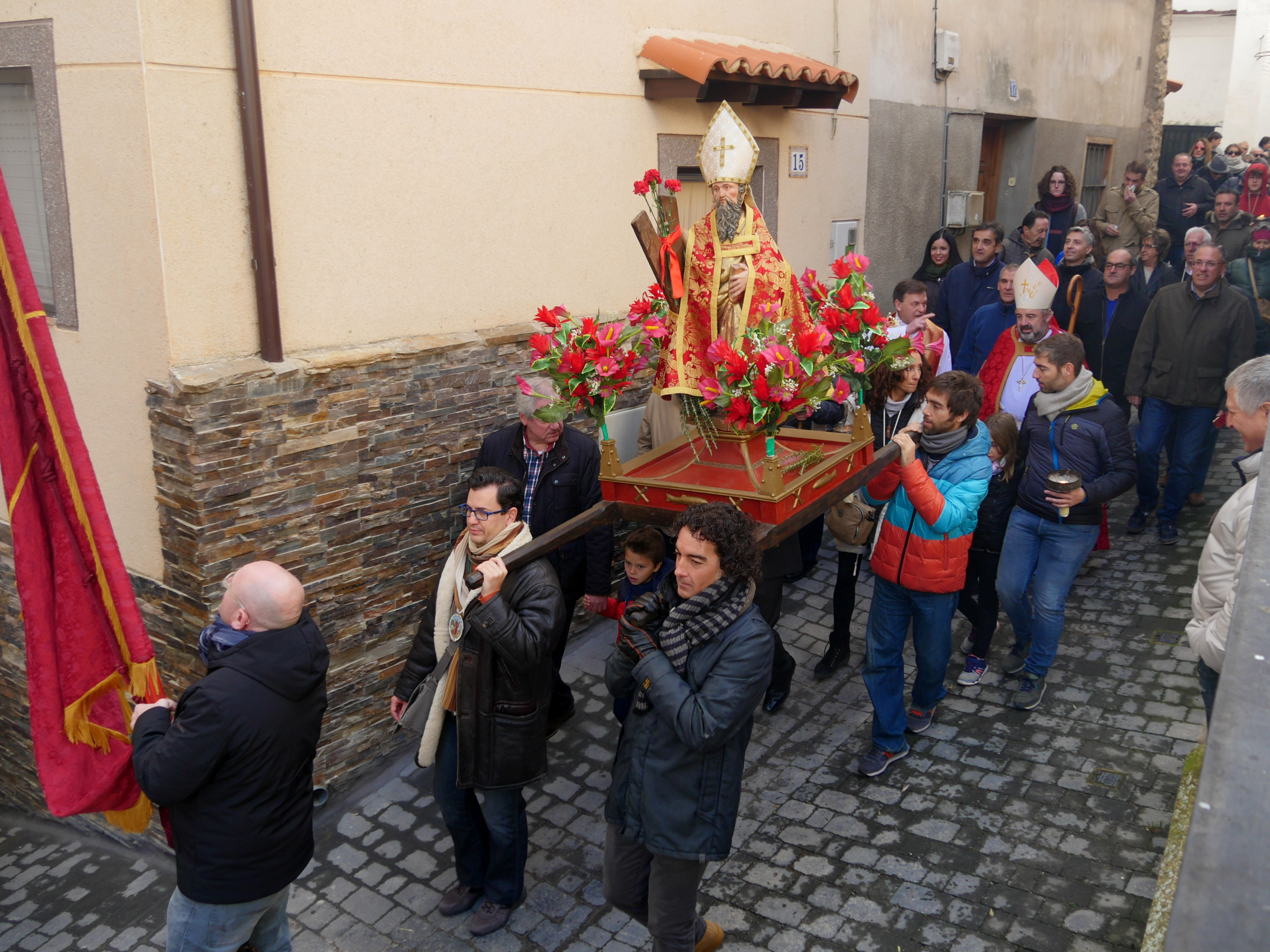
The smoke procession in 2017.

In 1888, a bout of smallpox struck the village and the people of the village looked to a higher power for a solution. Locals decided to light one candle for each saint the village venerated, and Saint Andrew, the patron saint of health, was the last to burn out. The village organised burnings of rosemary on the streets, for its medicinal properties, and prayed to St. Andrew. After the smallpox bout subsided, every year a procession with smoke has been held in the village to celebrate the village's ancestors, and in 2013 the smoke festival was declared a Fiesta of National Tourist Interest.

== Places of Interest ==
=== Buildings and monuments ===
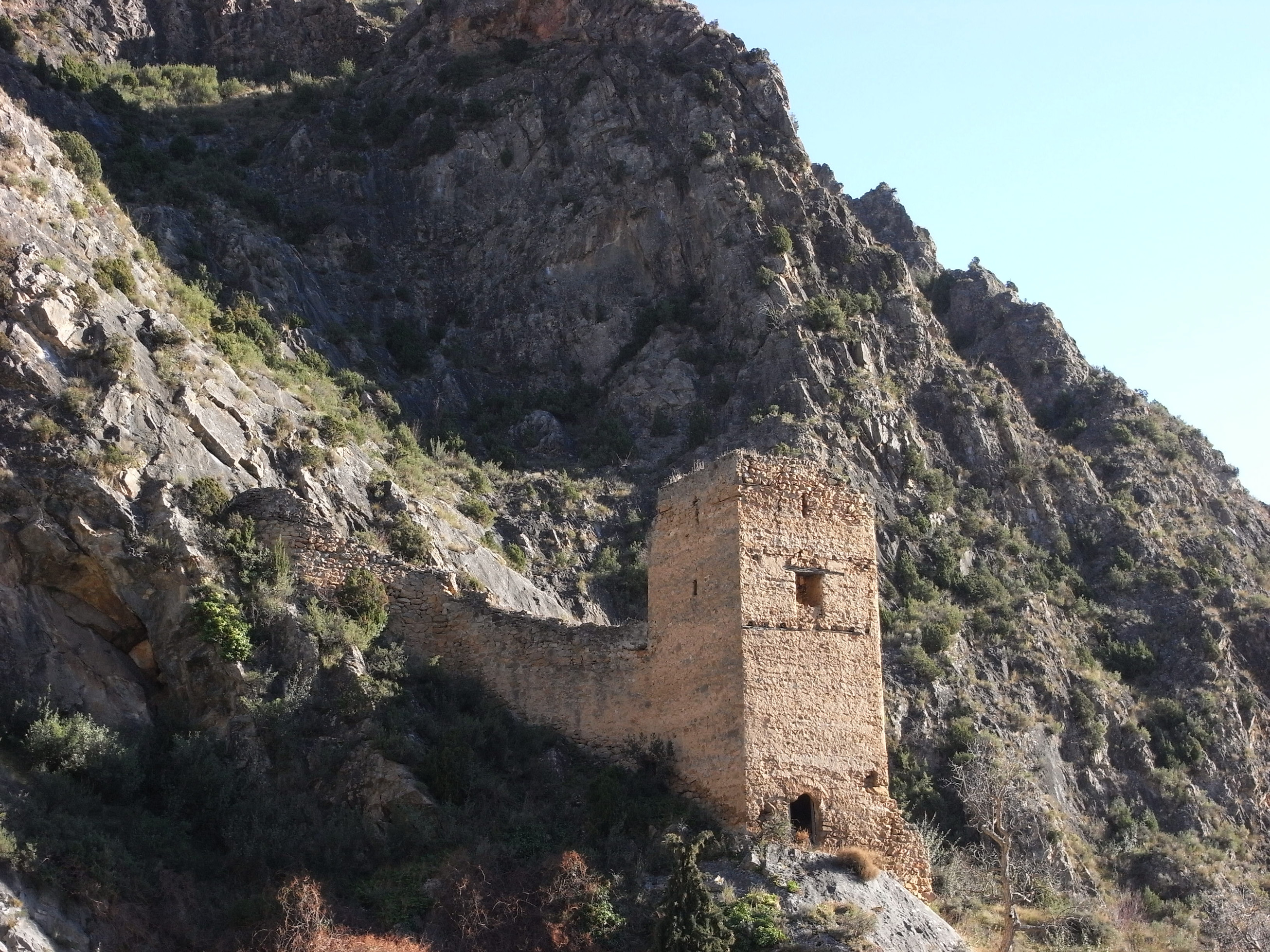
Ruins of the castle.

- Castle Bridge.
- Castle.
- Saint Servando and Saint German Church.

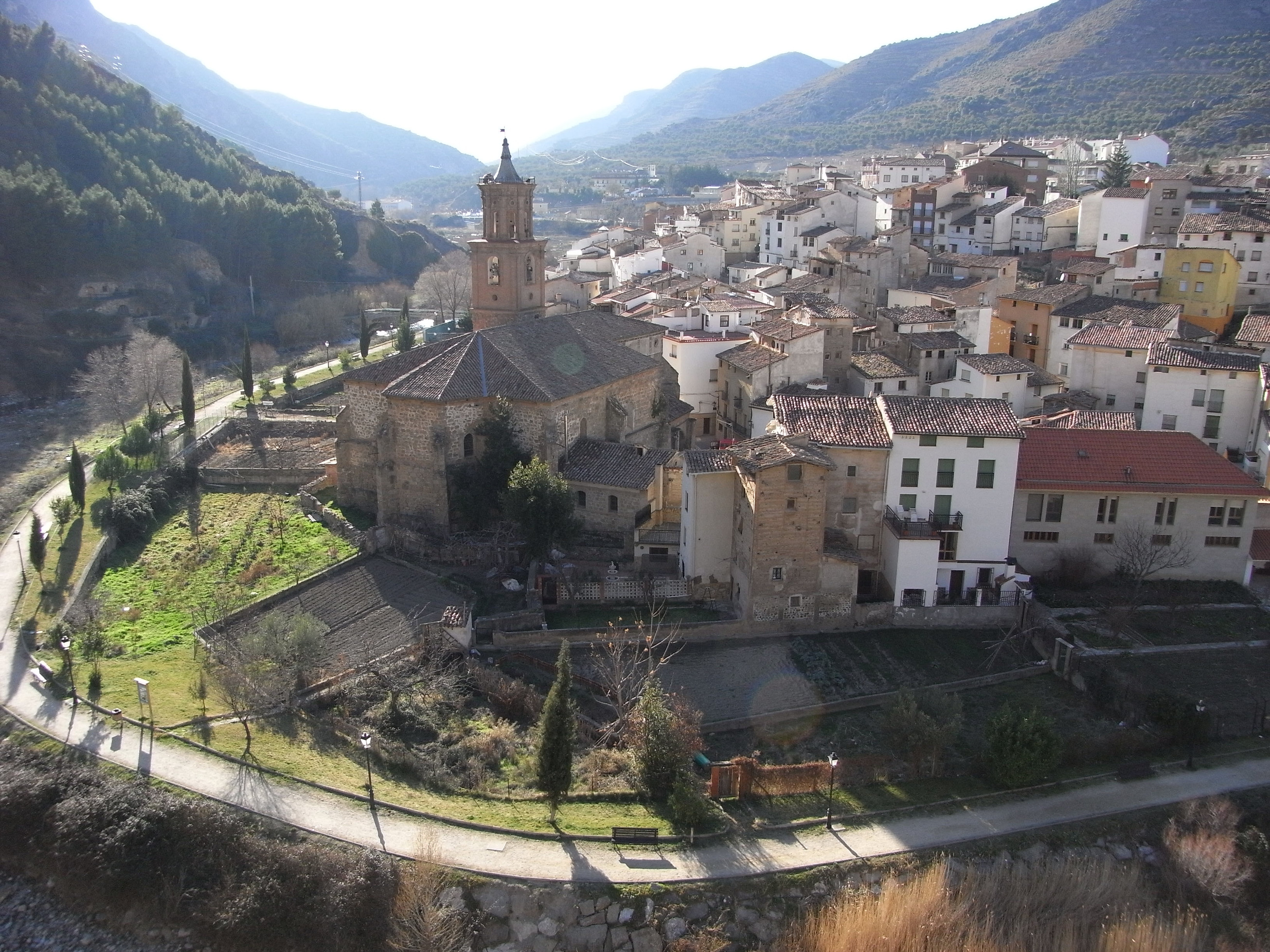
Surroundings of the Saint Servando and Saint German Church.

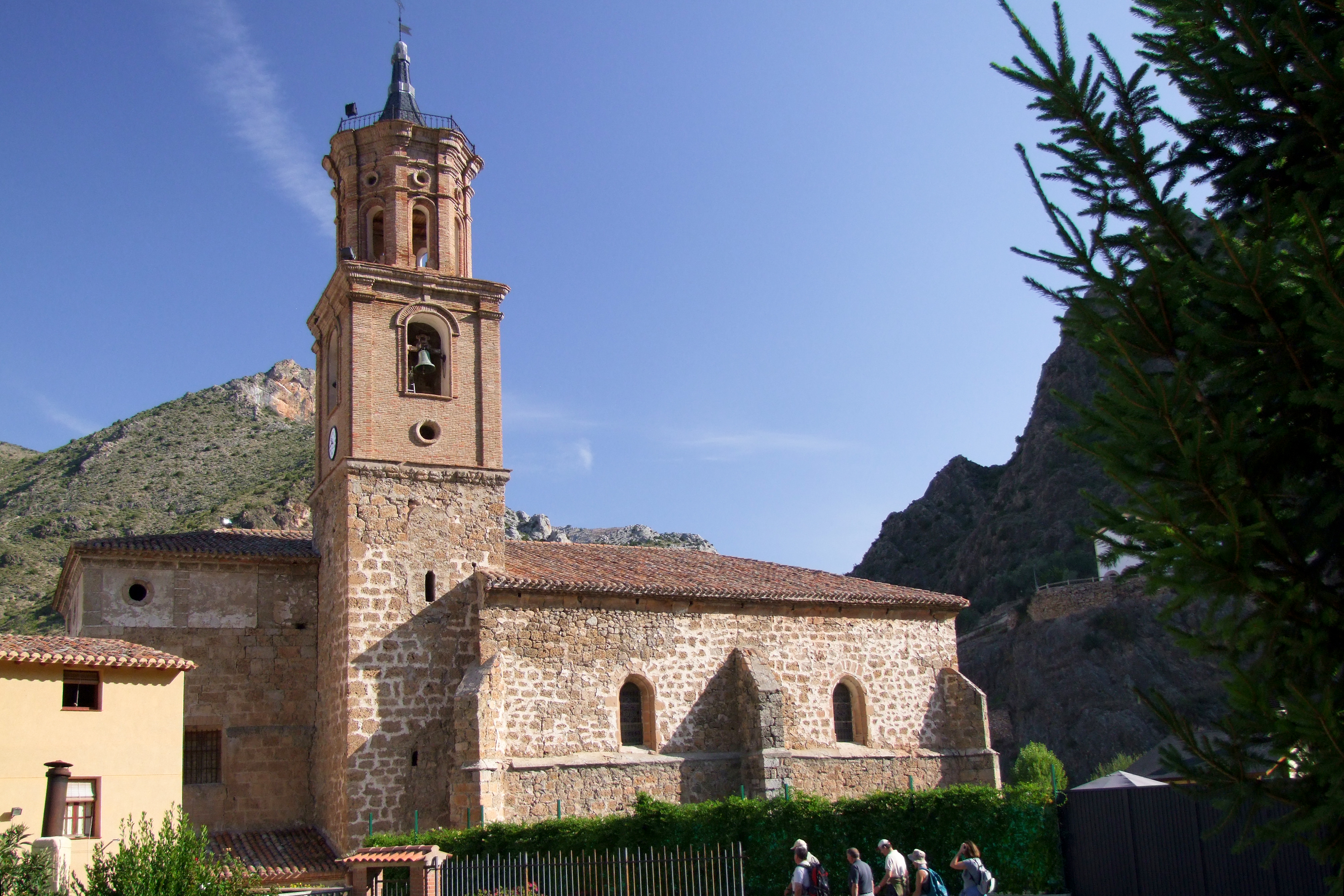
Saint Servando and Saint German Church.

- Hermitages: Saint Tirso, Peñalba, Virgin of the Tower, Saint Andrew, Saint Michael, Santiago, Saint Zoilo.

=== Hot Springs ===
The municipality is well known for its thermal waters, which flow through several springs. Some of them are leveraged by the village's resort known as "Balneario de Arnedillo", and others are opened to everyone and they are known as "Pozas".

=== Other places of Interest ===
- Footprints of dinosaurs.
- Snowfield.
- The vulture's viewpoint.
- Wind farm.
