= Villar del Río =

- Municipality
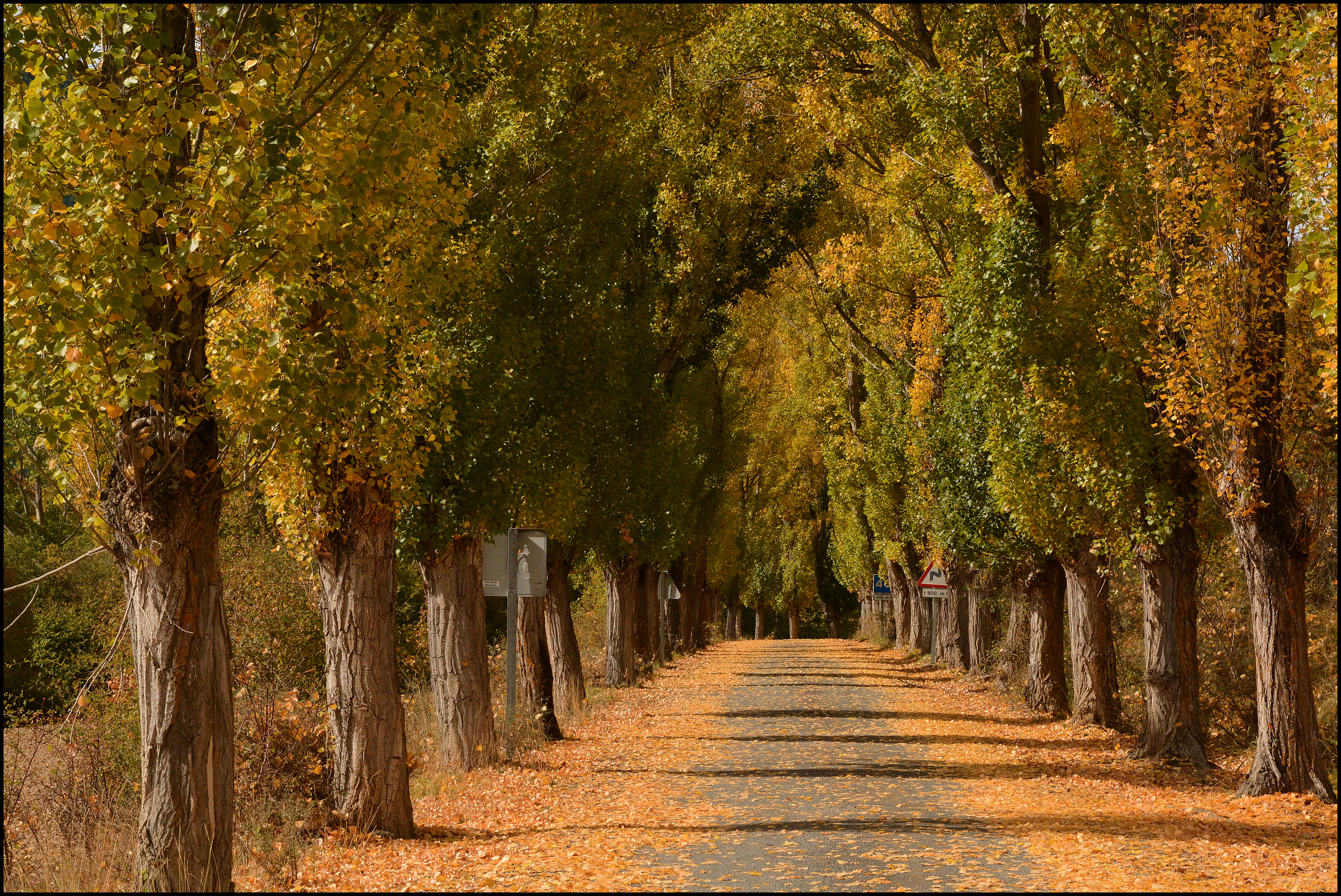

- Location in Spain. Villar del Río (Spain)
- Coordinates: 42°04′31″N 2°25′05″W
- Country: Spain
- Autonomous community: Castile and León
- Province: Soria
- Municipality: Villar del Río

Area
  - Total: 126 km^{2} (49 sq mi)

Population (2025-01-01)
  - Total: 155
  - Density: 1.23/km^{2} (3.19/sq mi)
- Time zone: UTC+1 (CET)
  - Summer (DST): UTC+2 (CEST)
- Website: Official website

Villar del Río is a municipality located in the province of Soria, Castile and León, Spain. According to the 2004 census (INE), the municipality has a population of 172 inhabitants.

== Villages ==
- La Cuesta

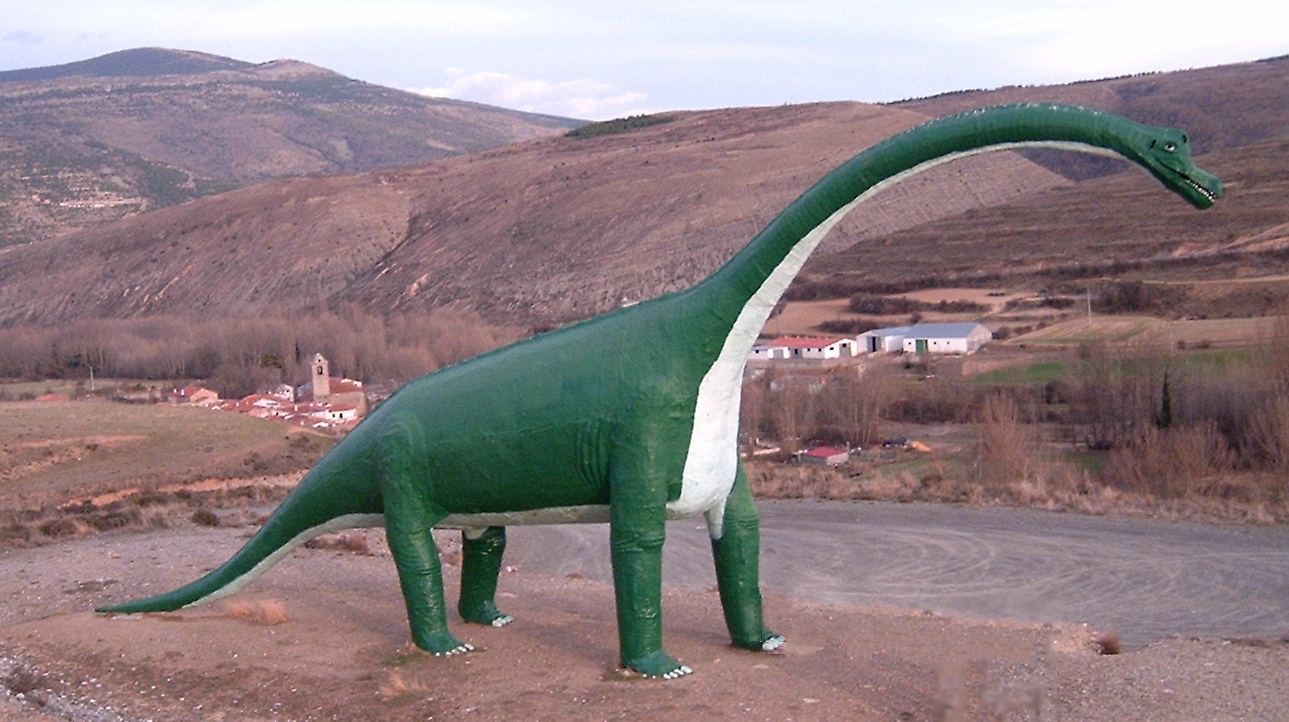
Dinosaur figure, outskirts of Villar del Río, 2005
