= Villarroya, La Rioja =

Villarroya
- Municipality
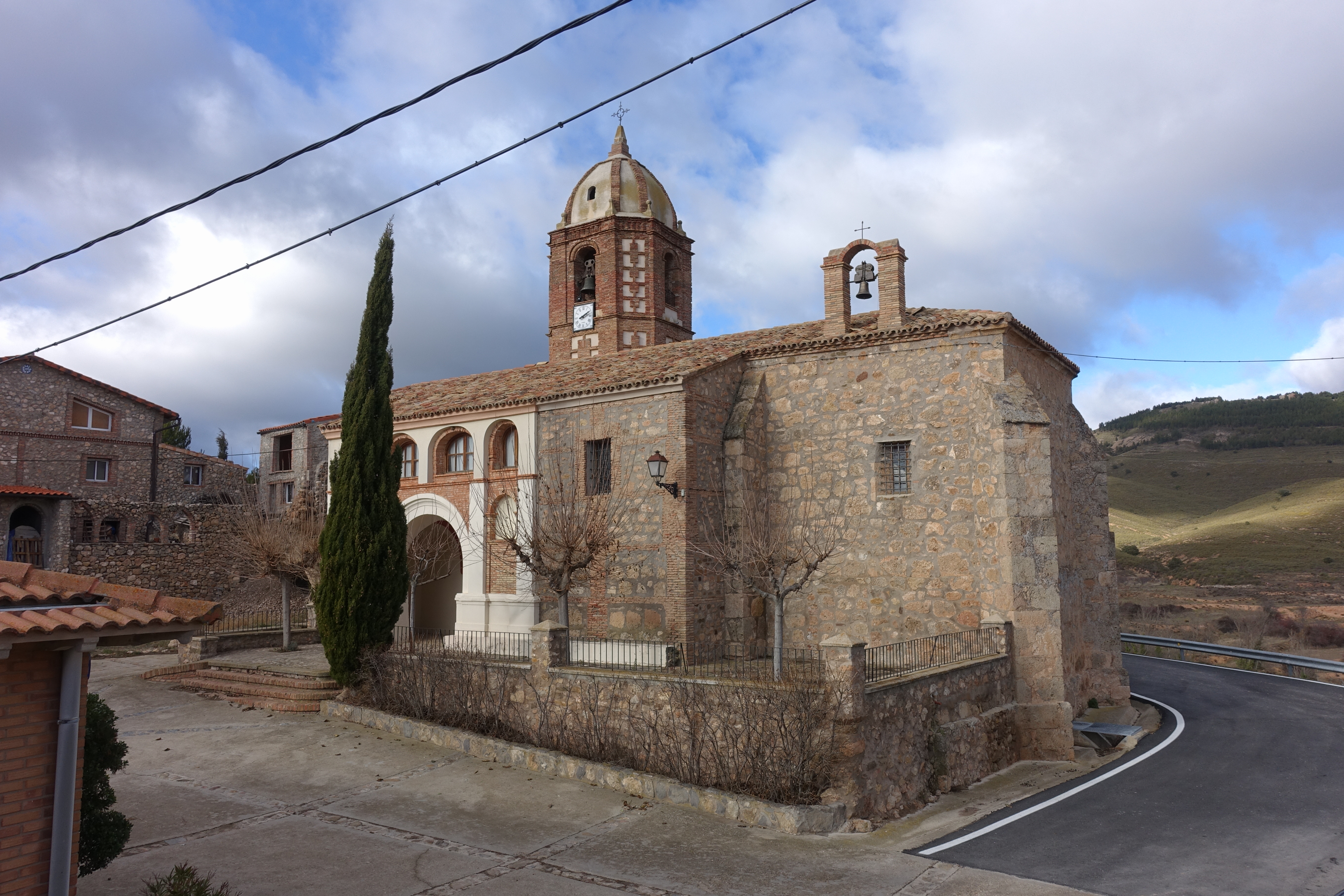

- Location of Villarroya within La Rioja

- Location within La Rioja, Spain Location within Spain
- Coordinates: 42°7′55″N 2°4′1″W
- Country: Spain
- Autonomous community: La Rioja
- Comarca: Arnedo

Government
  - Alcalde: Salvador Pérez Abad (People's Party)

Area
  - Total: 11.77 km^{2} (4.54 sq mi)
- Elevation: 928 m (3,045 ft)

Population (2025-01-01)
  - Total: 9
  - Density: 0.76/km^{2} (2.0/sq mi)
- Demonym(s): villarroyano, na
- Postal code: 26587

Villarroya is a municipality and village in the province and autonomous community of La Rioja, Spain. The municipality covers an area of 11.77 square kilometres (4.54 sq mi) and as of 2011 had a population of nine people.

== Politics ==
List of mayors since the democratic elections of 1979
Term	Mayor	Political party
1979–1983	Salvador Pérez Abad	CD
1983–1987	Salvador Pérez Abad	AP
1987–1991	Salvador Pérez Abad	AP
1991–1995	Salvador Pérez Abad	PP
1995–1999	Salvador Pérez Abad	PP
1999–2003	Salvador Pérez Abad	PP
2003–2007	Salvador Pérez Abad	PP
2007–2011	Salvador Pérez Abad	PP
2011–2015	Salvador Pérez Abad	PP
2015–2019	Salvador Pérez Abad	PP
2019–2023	n/d	n/d
2023–	n/d	n/d
