= Arnedo =

- Municipality
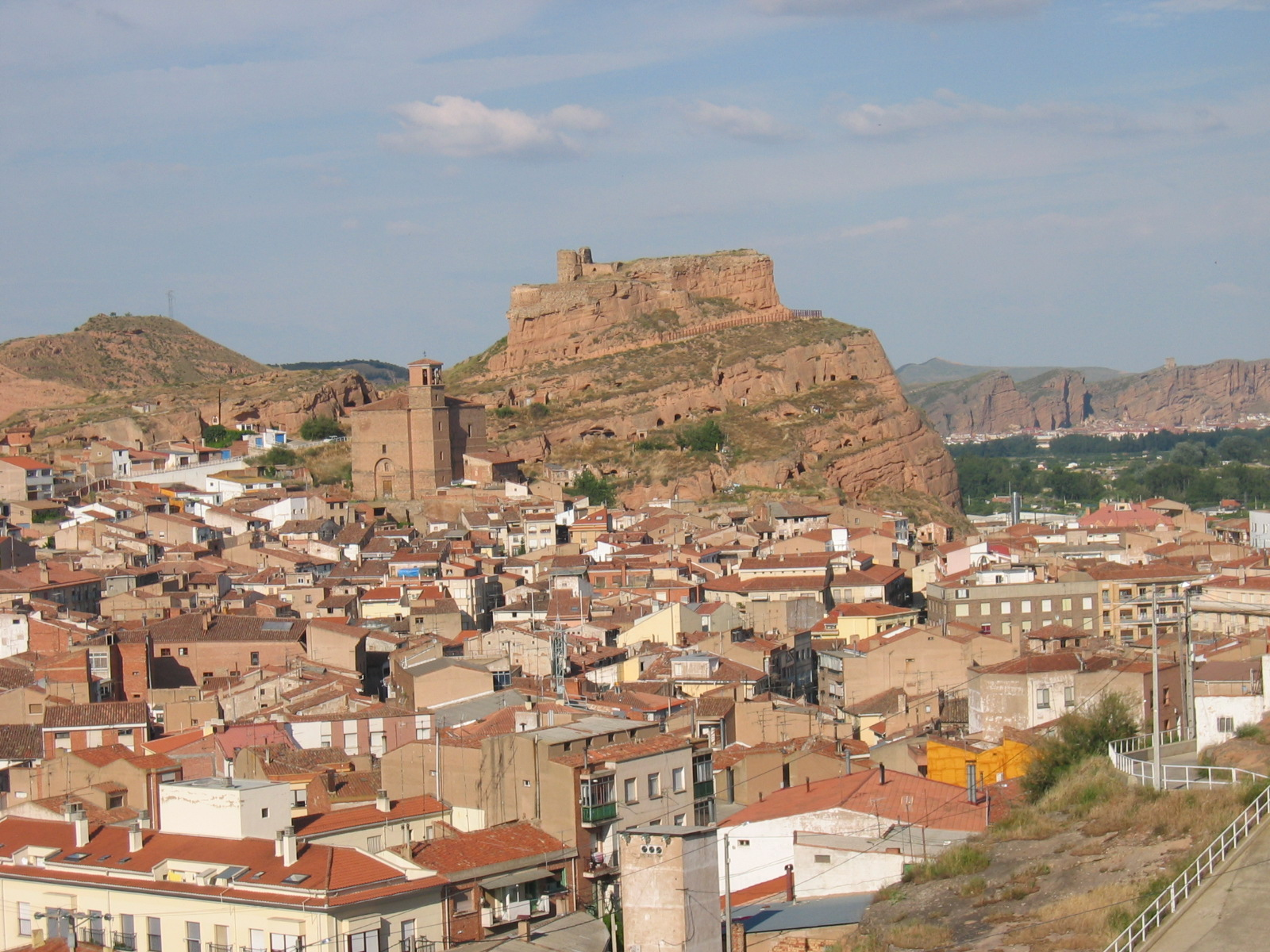
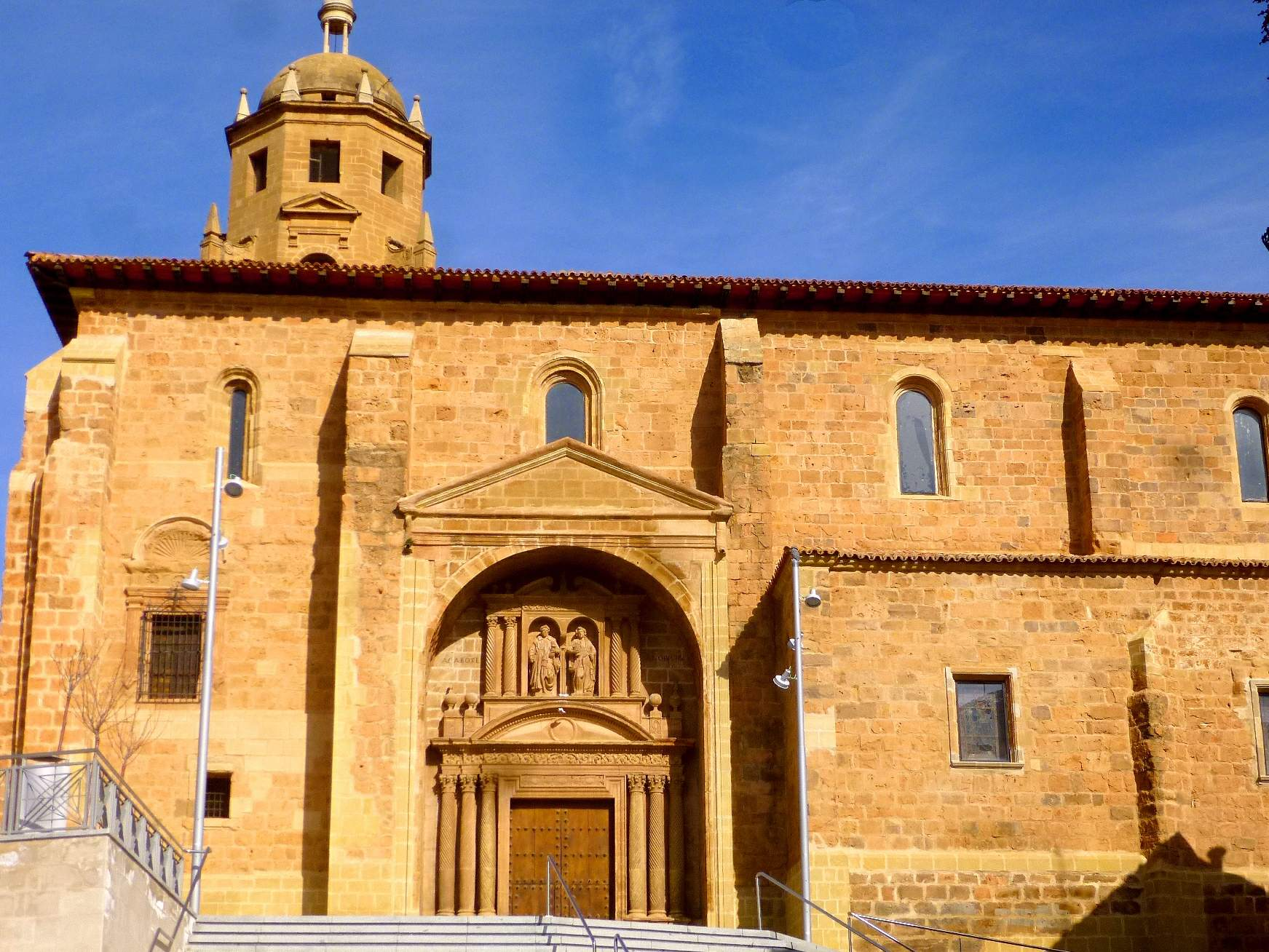
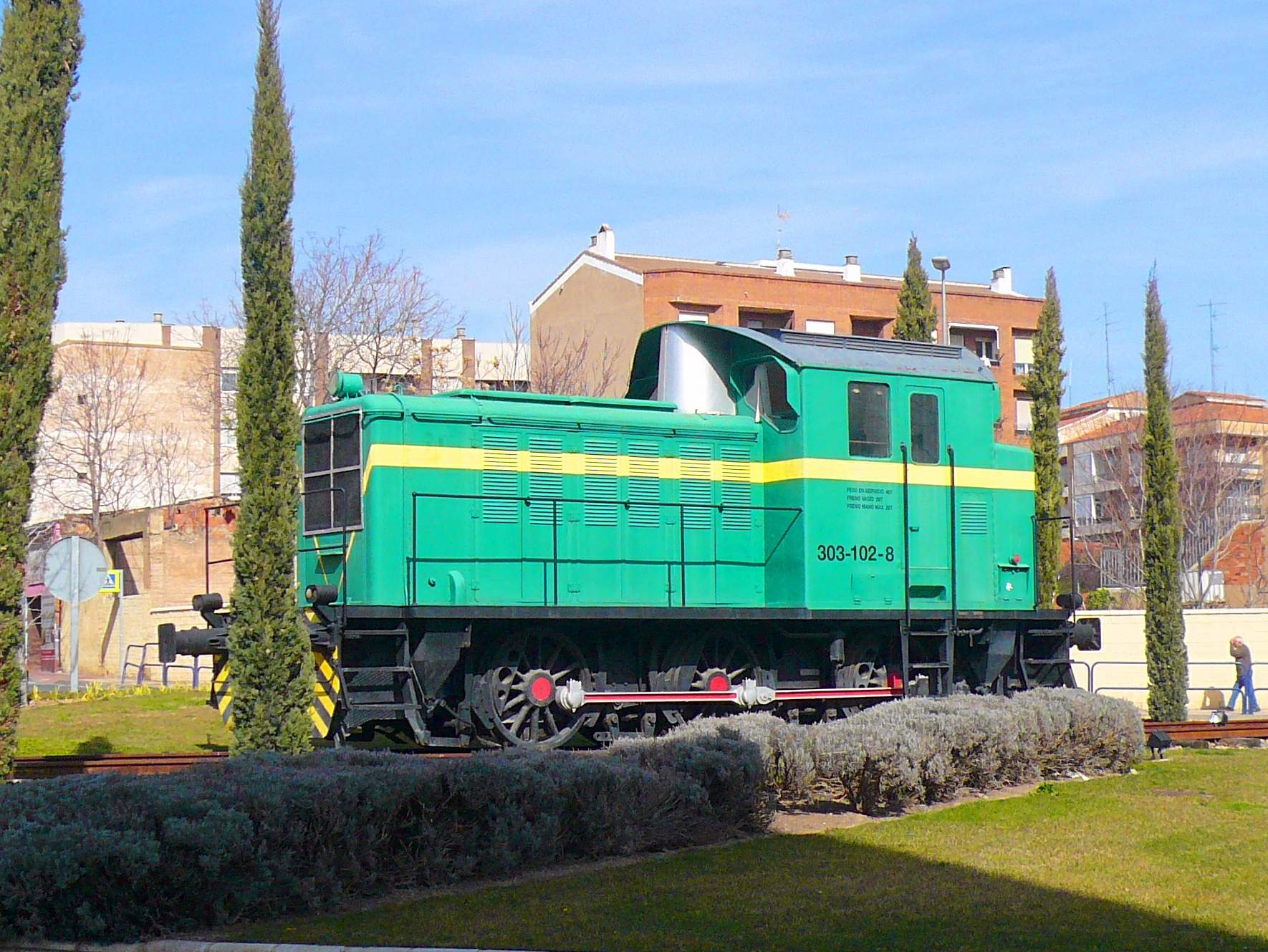
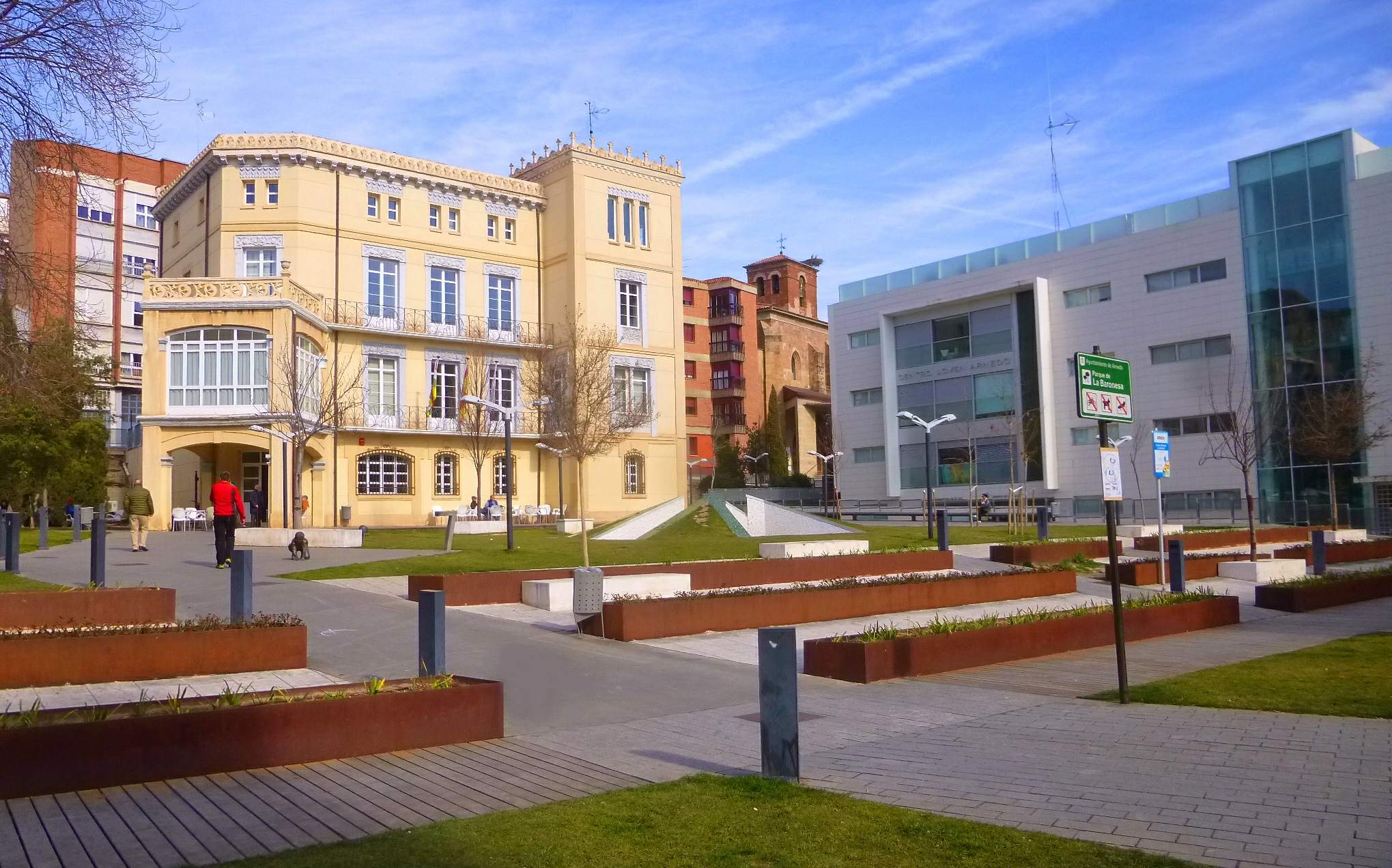

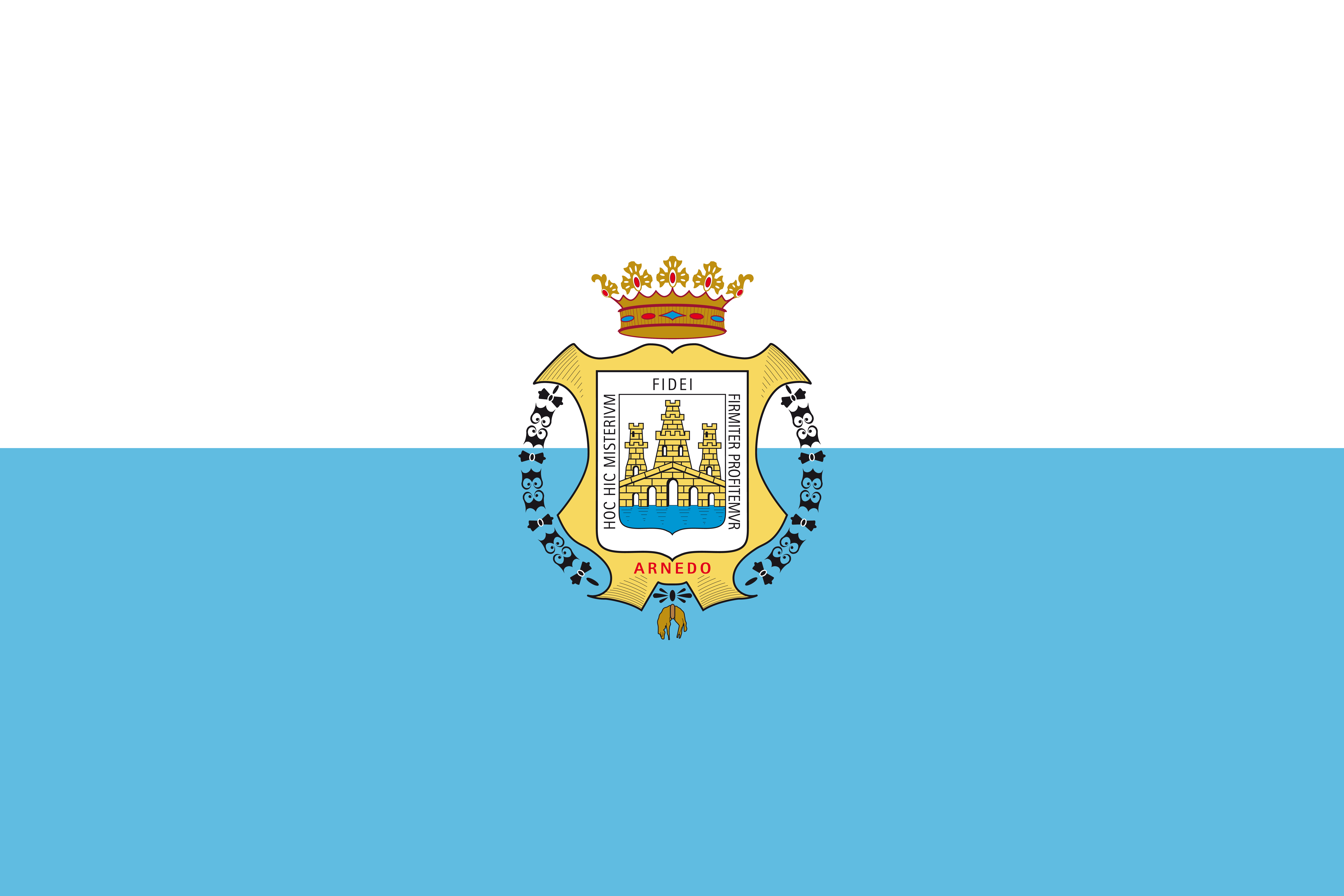
- Flag Coat of arms

- Location in La Rioja Location in Spain
- Coordinates: 42°13′N 2°6′W
- Country: Spain
- Community: La Rioja
- Province: La Rioja
- Comarca: Comarca de Arnedo

Government
  - Mayor: Rosa Mª Herce Arpón (PSOE)

Area
  - Total: 85.40 km^{2} (32.97 sq mi)
- Elevation: 550 m (1,800 ft)

Population (2025-01-01)
  - Total: 15,140
  - Density: 177.3/km^{2} (459.2/sq mi)
- Demonym(s): arnedano, na
- Time zone: UTC+1 (CET)
  - Summer (DST): UTC+2 (CEST)
- Postal code: 26580
- Website: Official website

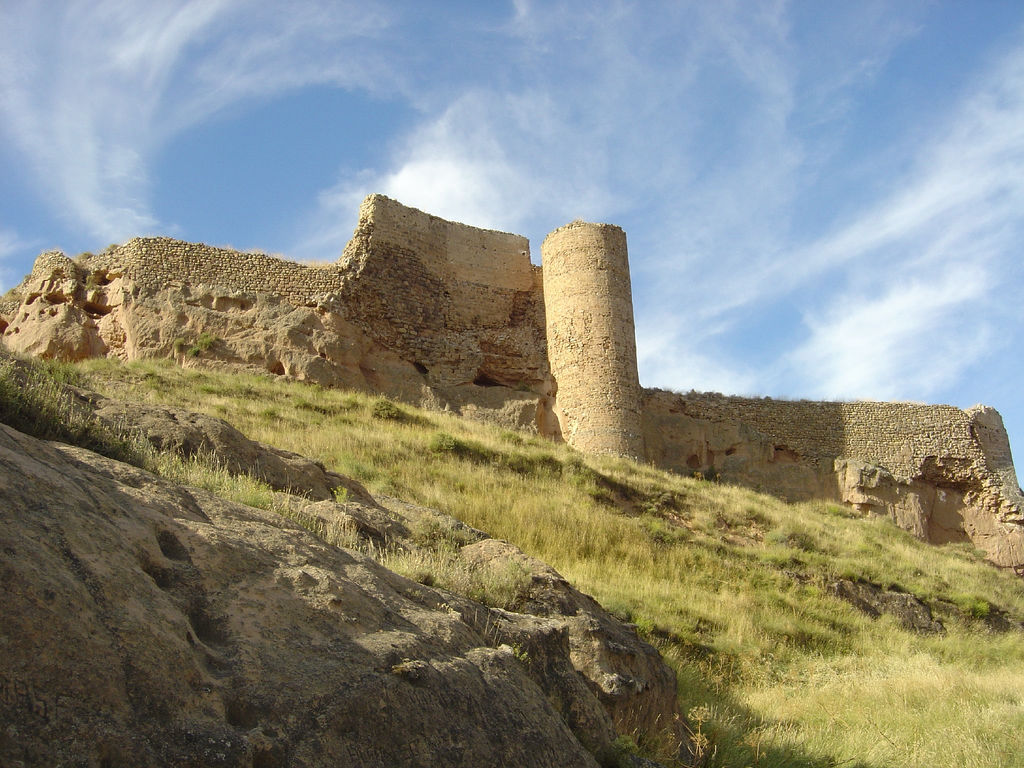
Castle of Arnedo

Arnedo is the third largest town in La Rioja, Spain. It is located near Calahorra, and has a population of about 15,000 people.

Its economy is based on the shoe industry.

== History ==
The area of Arnedo has been inhabited as early as the Neolithic Age. In pre-Roman times it was known as Sadacia or Sidacia, while the current name derives from the Latin Arenetum ("Place of sand"); the Romans, who arrived here in the 2nd century BC replacing the Celtiberians, built here a fortification to defend the hill, which commanded an important communication hub. Of the Visigothic Age are remains of a 6th-century cave-church.

The Moors conquered Arnedo in the 8th century AD and made it the capital of one of the 26 provinces in which they divided Iberia. The town was conquered by the Christian king Sancho I of Pamplona in 908-909.

On 5 January, 1932, there was a clash between the Guardia Civil and a group of striking workers. The police fired into the crowd killing 11 people and wounding another 30.

== Main sights ==
- Ruins of the castle
- Church of St. Thomas
- Church of St. Cosmas and Damian, housing a Baroque high altar
- Church of St. Eulalia
- Monastery of Nuestra Señora de Vico, situated some 4 km outside the city
- Gate of Nuestra Señora de la Nieves
- Museum of Shoes

== Politics ==
List of mayors since the democratic elections of 1979
Term	Mayor	Political party
1979–1983	Agapito Moreno Solana	CD
1983–1987	Santiago Orío Pérez	PSOE
1987–1991	José Mª León Quiñones	PSOE
1991–1995	José Mª León Quiñones	PSOE
1995–1999	José Mª León Quiñones	PSOE
1999–2003	José Mª León Quiñones	PSOE
2003–2007	Juan Antonio Abad Pérez	PP
2007–2011	Juan Antonio Abad Pérez	PP
2011–2015	Juan Antonio Abad Pérez	PP
2015–2019	Javier García Ibáñez	PSOE
2019–2023	Javier García Ibáñez	PSOE
2023–	n/d	n/d

== Notable people ==
- Musa ibn Musa al-Qasawi
- Leopoldo Alas Mínguez
- Jesús Ángel Solana

== Twin towns ==
- Andosilla, Spain
- Parthenay, France
- Elda, Spain
- (Western Sahara) Farsia, Western Sahara

== See also ==
- Enciso, La Rioja
- List of municipalities in La Rioja
