= Comarca de Arnedo =

Arnedo
- Comarca
- Interactive map of Arnedo
- Coordinates: 42.182296°N 2.159278°W
- Country: Spain

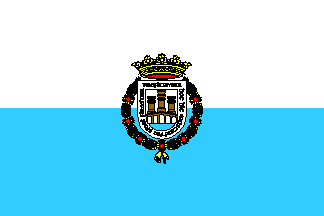
Flag of Arnedo

Arnedo is a comarca in La Rioja province in Spain.
