= List of Bienes de Interés Cultural in the Province of La Rioja =

This is a list of Bien de Interés Cultural landmarks in La Rioja, Spain.

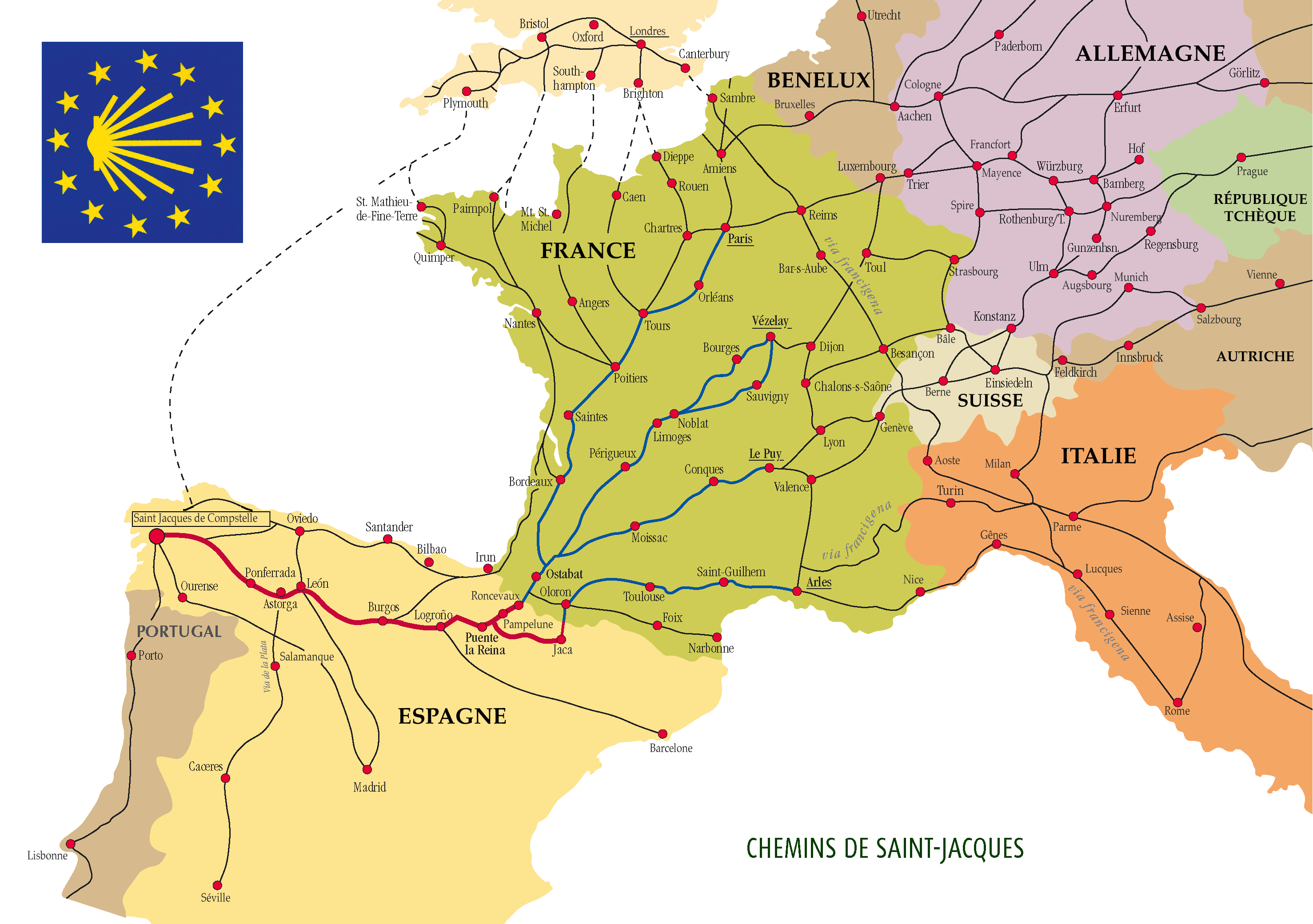
Map of the Way of St. James

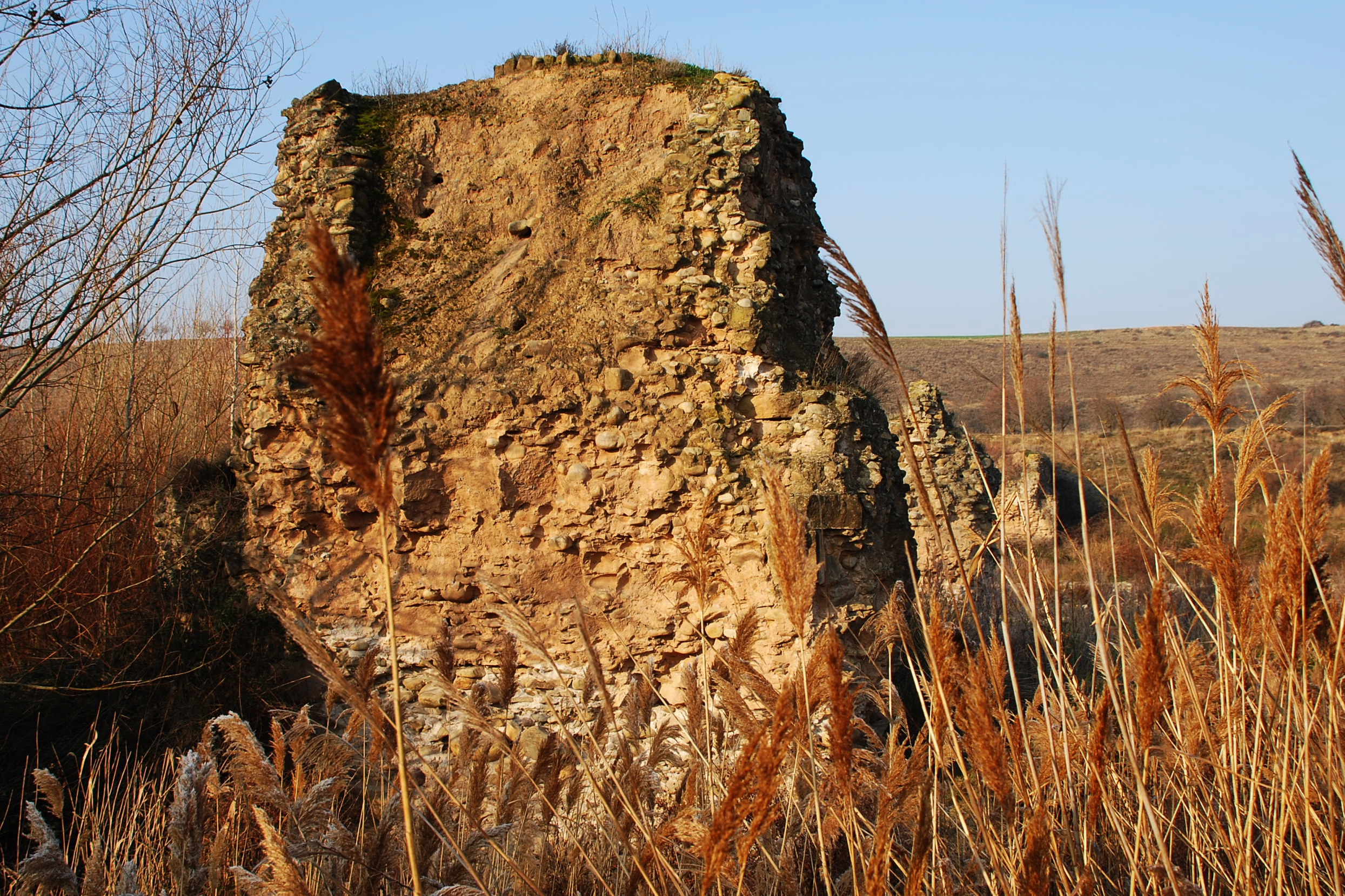
Ruins of the Roman Bridge on the Leza River.

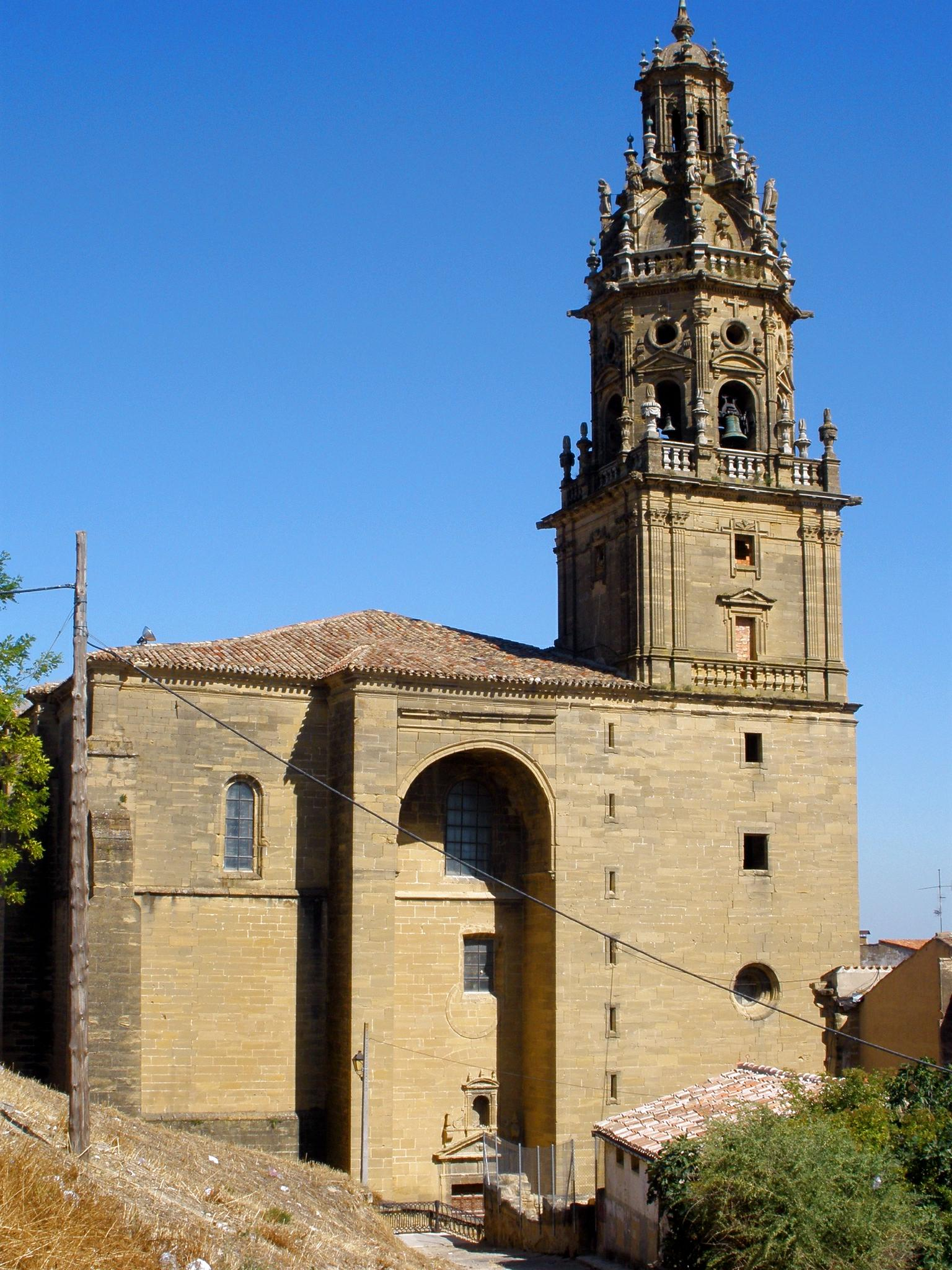
The Church of Santo Tomás.

- Bridge of Mantible
- Castle of Aguas Mansas
- Castle of Arnedo
- Castle of Cornago
- Castle of Leiva
- Castle of Quel
- Cathedral of Santa María of Calahorra
- Church of San Bartolomé (Logroño)
- Church of San Martín (Entrena)
- Church of Santa María (Fuenmayor)
- Church of Santa María de Palacio (Logroño)
- Church of Santo Tomás (Haro)
- Co-cathedral of Santa María de la Redonda
- Ruins of the Roman Bridge over the Leza River
- Monastery of Nuestra Señora de Valvanera
- Monastery of San Millán de Suso
- Monastery of San Millán de Yuso
- Monastery of Santa María (Cañas)
- Monastery of Santa Maria de la Piedad (Casalarreina)
- Santa María la Real of Nájera
- Theatre of Bretón de los Herreros
- Way of St. James
