= Bañares =

- Municipality
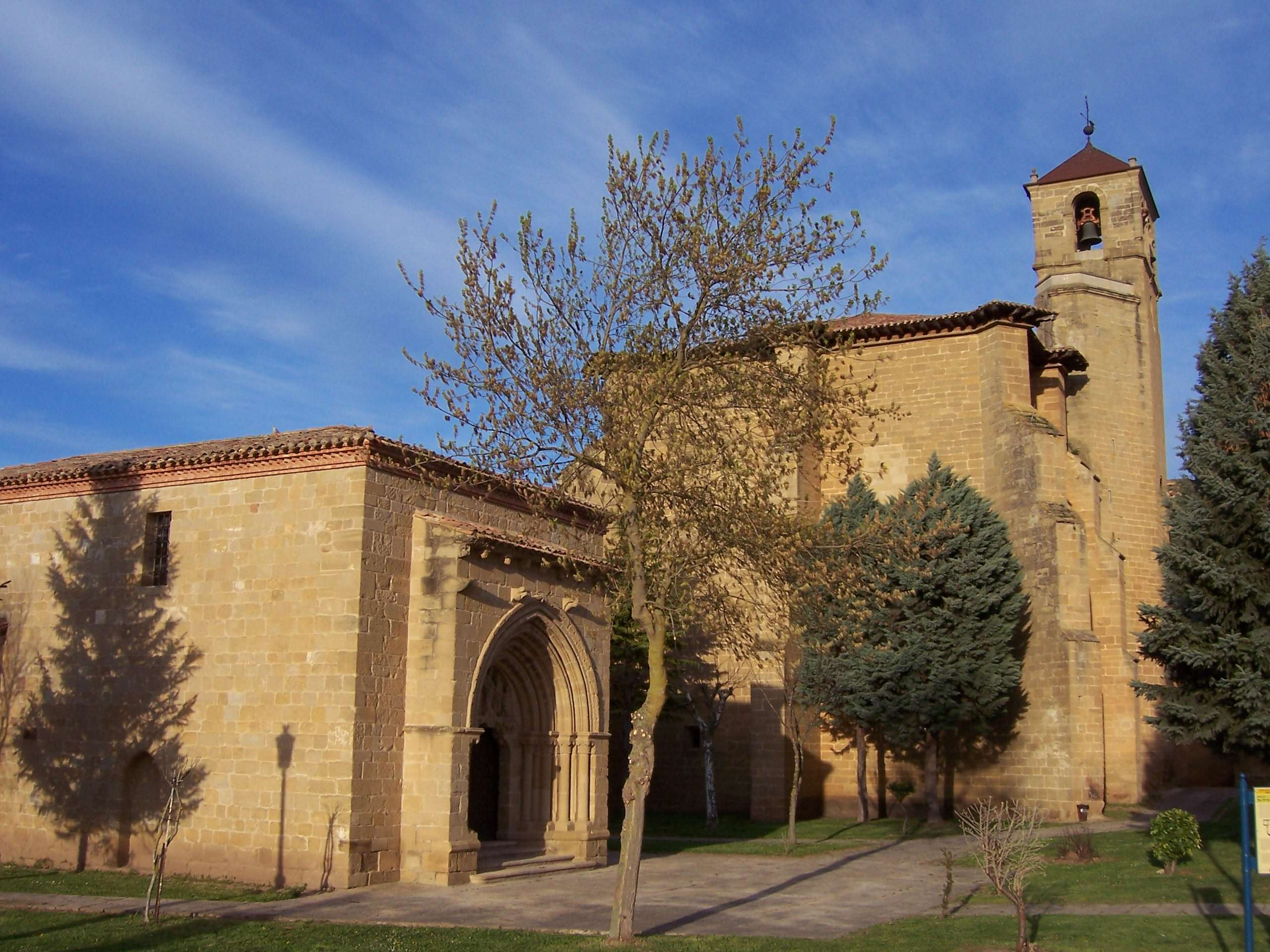
- Church and chapel in Bañares

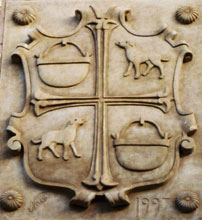
- Coat of arms

- Location of Bañares within La Rioja Bañares (Spain)
- Coordinates: 42°28′10″N 2°54′37″W
- Country: Spain
- Autonomous Community: La Rioja
- Province: La Rioja
- Comarca: Santo Domingo de la Calzada
- Established: c. 11th century

Government
  - Mayor: Antonio Santiago Ortiz de Landázuri Llamazares (PSOE)

Area
  - Total: 29.59 km^{2} (11.42 sq mi)
- Elevation (AMSL): 595 m (1,952 ft)

Population (2025-01-01)
  - Total: 198
  - Density: 6.69/km^{2} (17.3/sq mi)
- Demonym(s): bañarense; la fajolo
- Time zone: UTC+1 (CET)
  - Summer (DST): UTC+2 (CEST)
- Postal code: 26257
- Official language: Spanish
- Patron saint: Formerio
- Website: www.banares.org

Bañares is a municipality of La Rioja, Spain. It is located in the comarca of Santa Domingo de la Calzada, some 45 km west of Logroño.

Its economy is primarily based on agriculture. Especially in the cultivation of potato, cereal, beets and green beans.

== History ==
Municipal boundaries of Bañares.

The first references to the village of Bañares confirm its existence as early as 1051: (Scemeno Munioz de Cerratón (Note: alternatively written as Jimeno Muñoz de Zarratón) in his letter about a donation that he makes to Saint Millán, when Garsea was King of Pamplona in 1089, (Note: The reference is to García Sánchez III of Navarre, and the year corresponds to 1051 CE (the dating system followed in that period was the Spanish era which can be converted to the Common Era year by subtracting 38 years)) where he stands witness before Lope Enecores de Vaniares (Note: Lope Íñiguez de Bañares)).

In the year 1133 King Alfonso the Battler, who ruled over La Rioja, donated to Pedro, Archdeacon and rector of the Church of El Salvador, all the estates that touched upon the castle of Bilibio, along with all the land of the King in the village of Bañares, by Royal Decree.

In 1157, on the plain of Valpierre, near Bañares, two battles were fought between the troops of Sancho III of Castile and Sancho III of Navarre, the latter having tried to take advantage of the death of Alfonso VII to acquire Castilian territory.

By 1200, Pedro Fernández de Villegas I (hero of the Battle of Las Navas de Tolosa in 1212) was lord of the behetría (benefactor) of Bañares.

The town was the scene of bloody battles in the 12th and 13th centuries between the kingdoms of Navarre and Castile.

In 1478, the title of the Earl of Bañares was granted in favor of Alvaro de Zúñiga y Guzmán, owner of the castle, of which some ruins remain today, and the town remained in its domain until the abolition of this jurisdictional system in 1811 .

It was part of the province of Burgos until the province of Logroño was created, and today it belongs to the autonomous community of La Rioja.

The village has had a hospital since 1837.

== Demographics ==
As of January 1, 2010 the population of the town rose to 321 inhabitants, 156 men and 165 women.

demographic vertical bar chart of Bañares (municipality) between 1857 and 2010
Voting age population (1857-1897) according to the INE population census of the 19th century.
Voting age population (1900-1991) or Resident population (2001) according to the INE population census.
Population according to the 2010 municipal register of INE.

== Etymology ==
In the papal bull of 1199 which granted privileges to the Monasteries of San Millán de la Cogolla, it appears as "Bannares", with the collective suffix -ar and the Mozarabic feminine plural -es. The name of the place makes reference to baths, widely used in the Roman period.

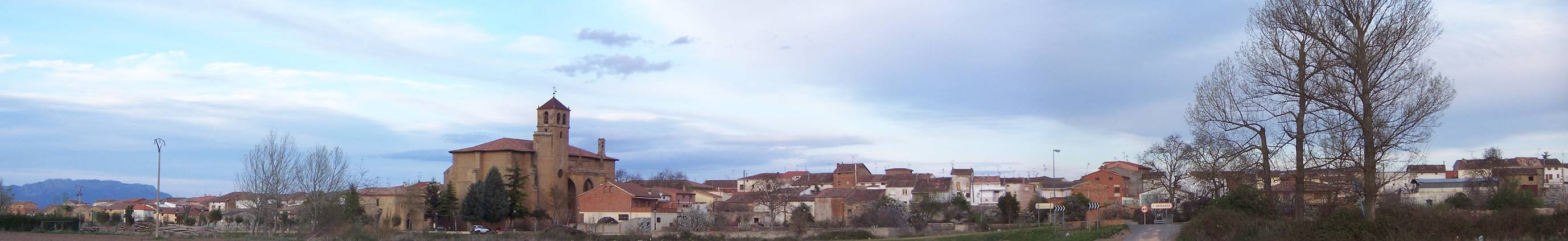
View of Bañares

== Tourism ==
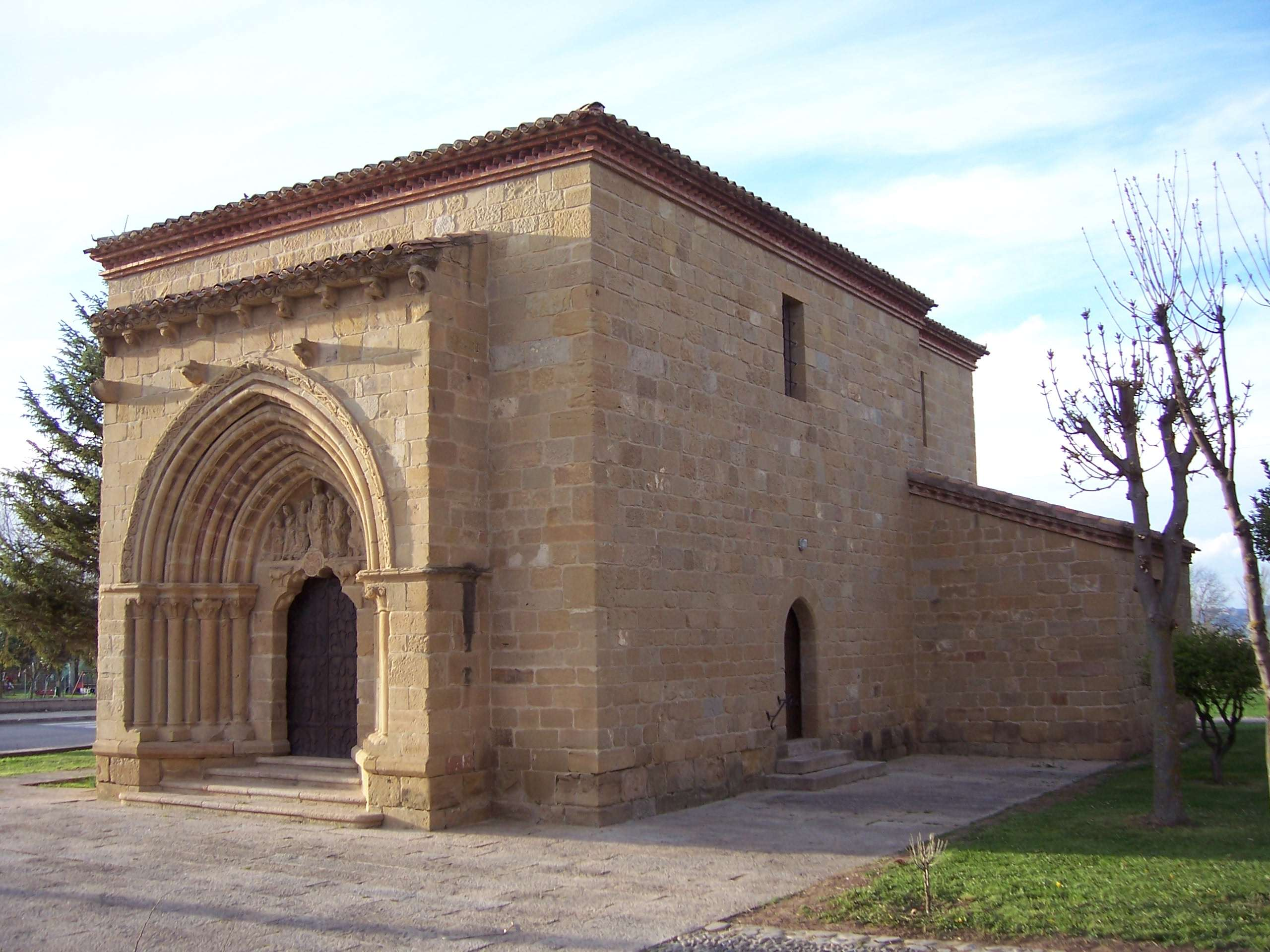
Hermitage of Santa Cruz.

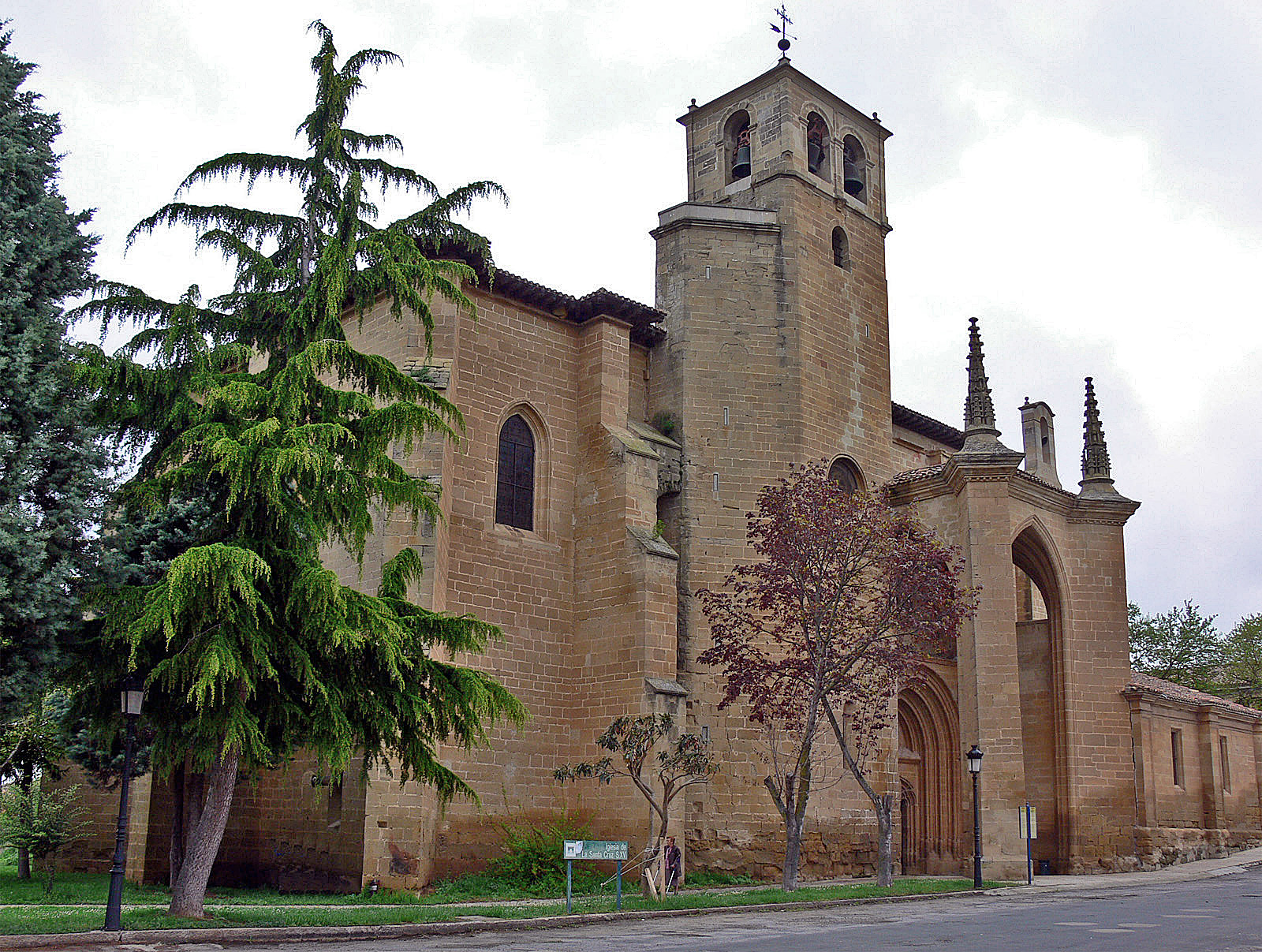
Church of Santa Cruz

=== Buildings and monuments ===
==== Chapel of Santa Cruz or Santa Maria la Antigua (Saint Mary the Ancient) ====
An ancient, Romanesque parish church that was constructed around the 12th century.

After a new church was built with the name Santa Cruz, the older one was renamed as Santa Maria la Antigua (Saint Mary the Ancient).

It was declared a Bien de Interés Cultural (Heritage of Cultural Interest) in the Monument category on 9 April 1964.

==== Parish church of the Holy Cross (Iglesia parroquial de la Santa Cruz) ====
It is a Gothic building. Construction began around 1490 and ended around 1510.

In the interior of the church, one finds the ark of San Formerio. It is one of the jewels of Spanish Romanesque art; scholars place it halfway through the 12th century. It is made of wood covered with copper plates enameled with different motifs.

It was declared a Bien de Interés Cultural (Heritage of Cultural Interest) in the Monument category on 9 April 1964.

==== Castle of Bañares ====
This castle is now in ruins; since the stone was sold for construction. It is known that it had thick walls, a keep, and a moat that defended it.

Currently only the Banares castle ruins are preserved, situated on the exit road toward Hervias, which allows reconstruction of a rectangular floor plan, with an entrance, facing east, on one of the long sides, flanked by cylindrical turrets, that also reinforce the corners of the rectangle. The walls were of great thickness and sloped. In its interior, one found the keep, attached to the southern section of the wall. Rectangular in form, it was constructed with massive cobblestone and pebble core masonry walls, reaching approximately 3.5 m in thickness. The interior space of this tower is divided longitudinally (E-W) in two naves, by two semi-circular arches which support a square pillar in the center and two corbels on the eastern and western walls.

== Festivals ==
The fiesta in honor of St. Formerio is celebrated on the third weekend of August. These include religious ceremonies, the running of the bulls, rock concerts and a community meal held the last day in the La Salceda park.

On the last Sunday of July, a day in honor of the Virgin of Antiquity (Spanish: La Virgen De La Antigua) is celebrated. Their local holidays were celebrated at the end of September, after the harvest. They are in honor of St. Formerio, patron saint of the village.

The main attraction of these festivals are their processions that began the Day of Thanks, celebrated on September 14, and then the Patronage Festivals celebrated on the 24th and 25th of the same month. Recently, the patronal fiestas have been changed to the third weekend, but September 25 is still celebrated as Thanks.

Every day of the fiestas is celebrated by a procession, where the young people raise the patron saint in dance through many streets of the pueblo.

In the past, there were teams of young boys, that competed amongst themselves to see who was going to be the dance team that year, with permission from the Mayor. Now, for the lack of men, the women have to do it.

The dances on the first two days are performed with castanets, the dancers are eight or nine similarly dressed with somewhat different neckerchiefs or Cachiburrios. The chief attire is a white shirt and trousers with a red sash, and colored ribbons across the body held in place by the sash. elbow patches with colored ribbons and the castanets also have colored ribbons sewn onto them. And on the shoulders, a shawl of bright colors. The shoes were white espadrilles, with colored ribbons.

The dances with castanets have two rhythms - one that is danced throughout the procession; and another that takes place a few meters before entering the church that is danced at high speed over a short stretch of space as the dancers perform short steps very rapidly, this is performed in a corridor while the retinue of the church authorities enter.

On the second day of the festival, the dances are performed with sticks, that are called Troqueados. There are various dances of which the most picturesque are those called the dance of the Swords and the dance of the Professions. In the first a type of combat is carried out between two dancers, and subsequently between everyone at the battle scene, which ends with neither victor nor vanquished. In the dance of the Professions, as its own name indicates, is a dance in which everyone takes part and each in turn acts out a different job, such as tailor, shoemaker, blacksmith, violinist, flycatcher, etc.

Another cultural event, celebrated in that area, is the serenading of newlyweds when they returned from their honeymoon. This only happened once for each couple and was called "Asking for Rebollo". At night, when they went to sleep, the gang of their friends and acquaintances would go, singing, to hang around the door of the newlyweds' house, who would then treat their friends to liquor and pastries until the early hours of the morning.

The most well-known songs with which the newlyweds are serenaded are the following:

It looks like I am watching you,
going down the stairs
with the bottle in my hand
and cookies in the other.

To these newlyweds
we come to serenade them
and to give them congratulations
with all sincerity.

To these newlyweds,
we wish them good fortune
and in about nine months
may they have a child in the crib.

== Cuisine ==
The people use many products from the garden, examples being vegetable stew (called Menestra Riojana, or Riojan Stew), potatoes with sausage, potatoes with beef, piquillo peppers. Additionally, the meat is excellent, good examples being the local chorizo, sausages, and chuletillas al sarmiento (lamb chops with vine shoots), taking advantage of the wood that is a result of the pruning of the abundant vineyards in the area.

== Sports facilities ==
Municipal pelota court, swimming pools and soccer fields of the Salceda. In addition there is a tourist cycling route that runs along the old railroad track path included in the catalog of greenways.

== See also ==
- List of Bien de Interés Cultural in the Province of La Rioja
- List of municipalities in La Rioja
- La Rioja (Spain)
