= Quel =

Quel may refer to:

- QUEL query languages, a relational database access language
- Quel, La Rioja, a municipality in La Rioja, Spain
- Quél, taxonomic author abbreviation for Lucien Quélet (1832–1899), French naturalist and mycologist
