= Valdeperillo =

- Populated place
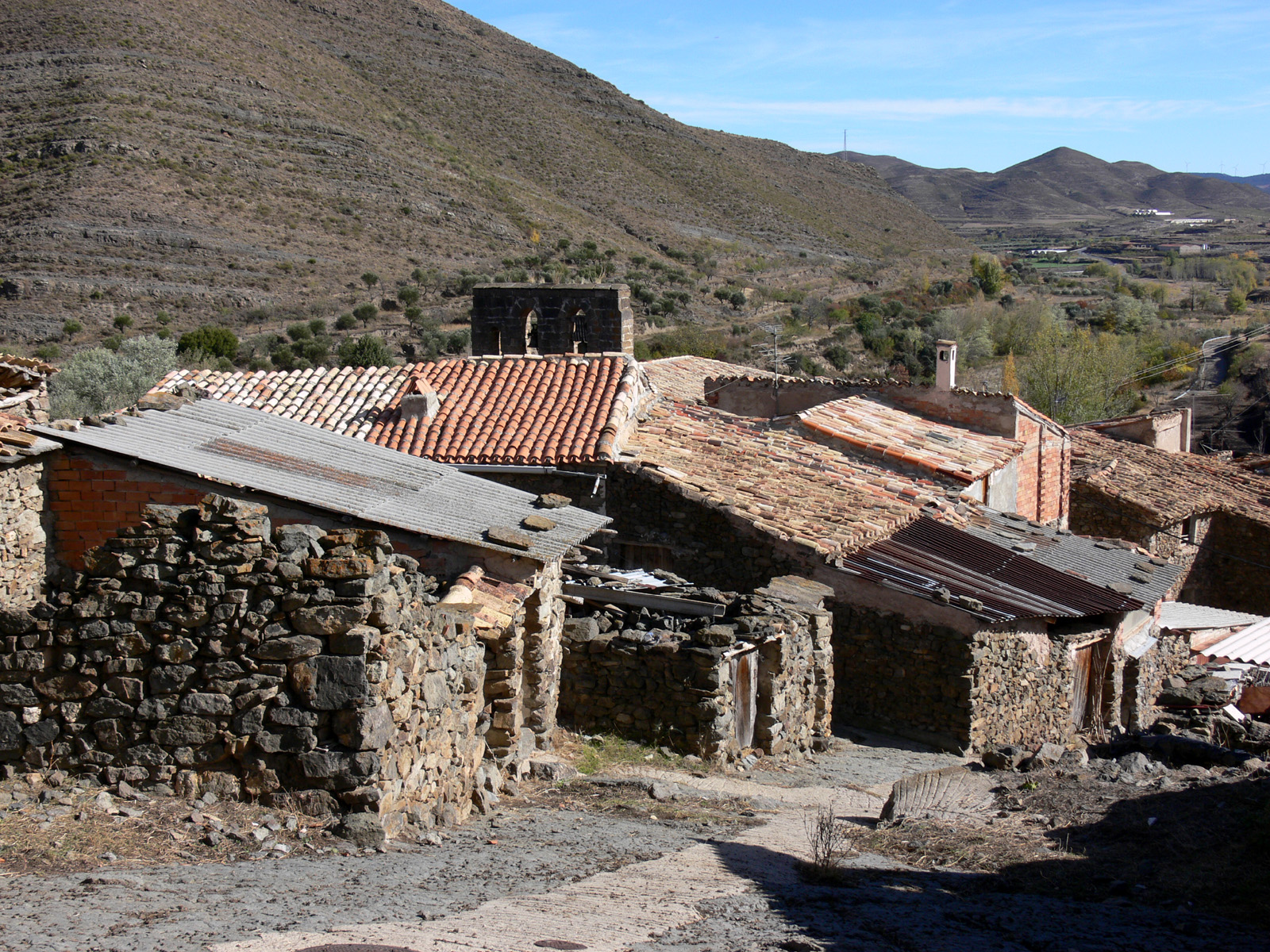

- Location within La Rioja, Spain Location within Spain
- Country: Spain
- Autonomous community: La Rioja
- Comarca: Cervera

Population
  - Total: 11
- Postal code: 26527

Valdeperillo is a village in the municipality of Cornago, in the province and autonomous community of La Rioja, Spain. As of 2019 had a population of 11 people.
