= Cornago =

- Municipality
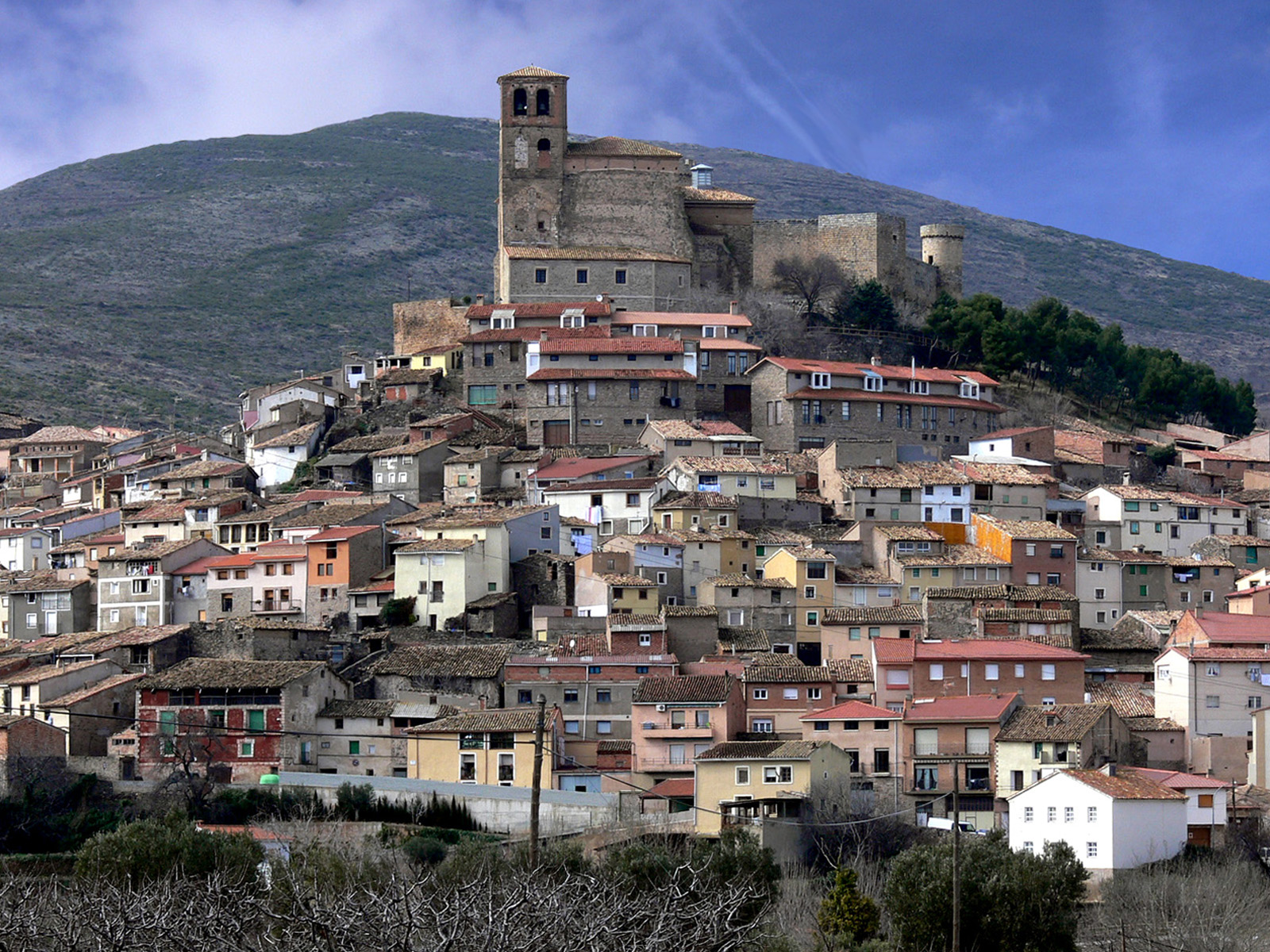
- Skyline of Cornago

- Flag Coat of arms

- Location within La Rioja, Spain Location within Spain
- Coordinates: 42°04′N 2°06′W
- Country: Spain
- Autonomous community: La Rioja
- Comarca: Cervera del Río Alhama

Government
  - Mayor: Luis Manuel Martínez Zapater (PSOE)

Area
  - Total: 90.99 km^{2} (35.13 sq mi)
- Elevation: 750 m (2,460 ft)

Population (2025-01-01)
  - Total: 298
- Postal code: 26526
- Website: www.cornago.org

Cornago is a village in the province and autonomous community of La Rioja, Spain. The municipality covers an area of 8.54 square kilometres (3.30 sq mi) and as of 2011 had a population of 426 people.

== Demographics ==
=== Population centres ===
- Cornago
- Valdeperillo

== Main sights ==
=== Religious buildings ===
- Church of Saint Peter
- Monastery of Our Lady of Campolapuente
- Hermitage of Saint Catherine
- Hermitage of Saint Anne
- Hermitage of Saint Blaise, former synagogue
- Hermitage of Saint Roch
- Hermitage of Saint Sebastian
- Hermitage of Saint Martin

=== Civil buildings ===
- Castle of Cornago
- Palace of the Baroja family
Monuments of Cornago

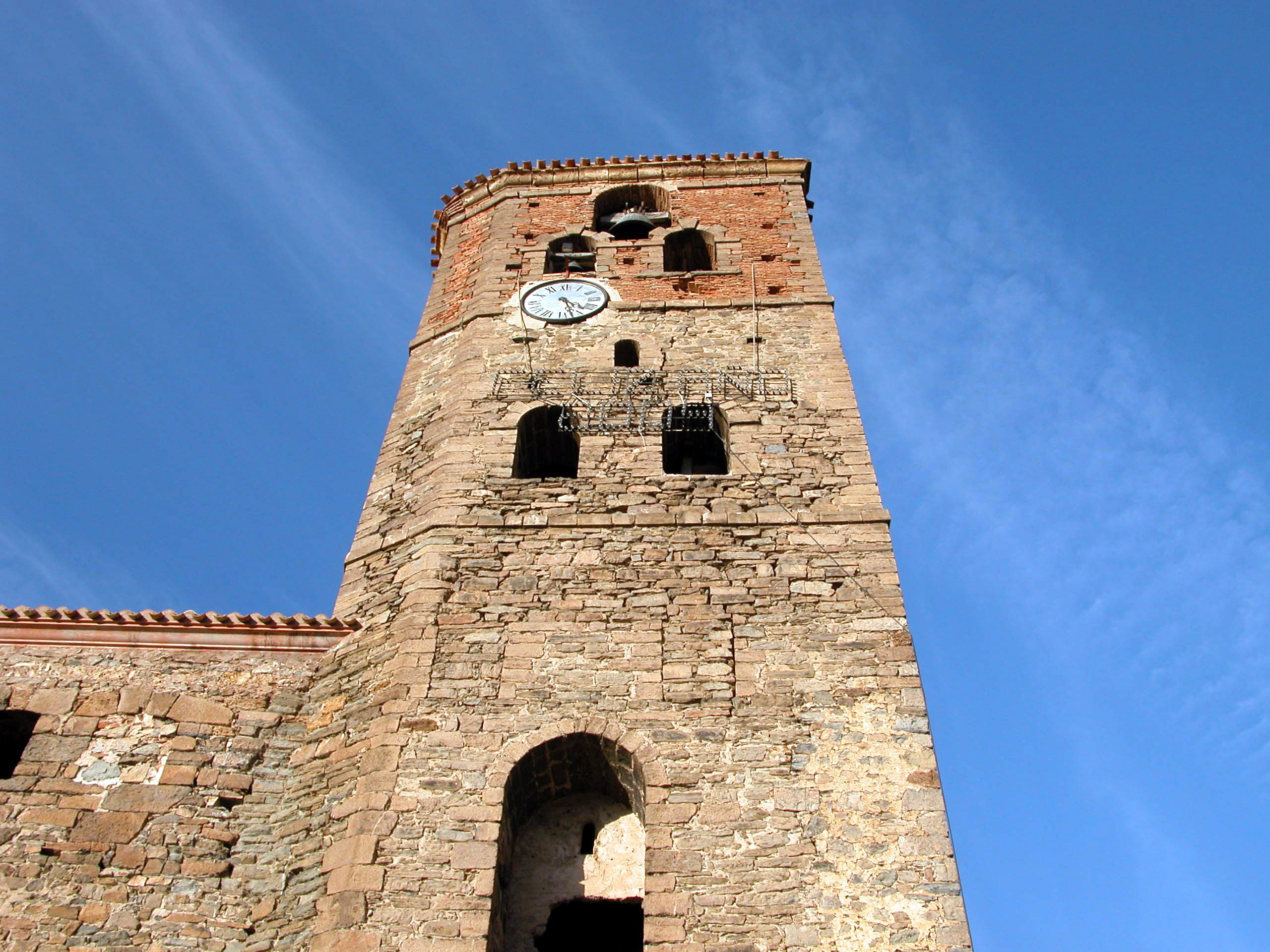
Church of Saint Peter

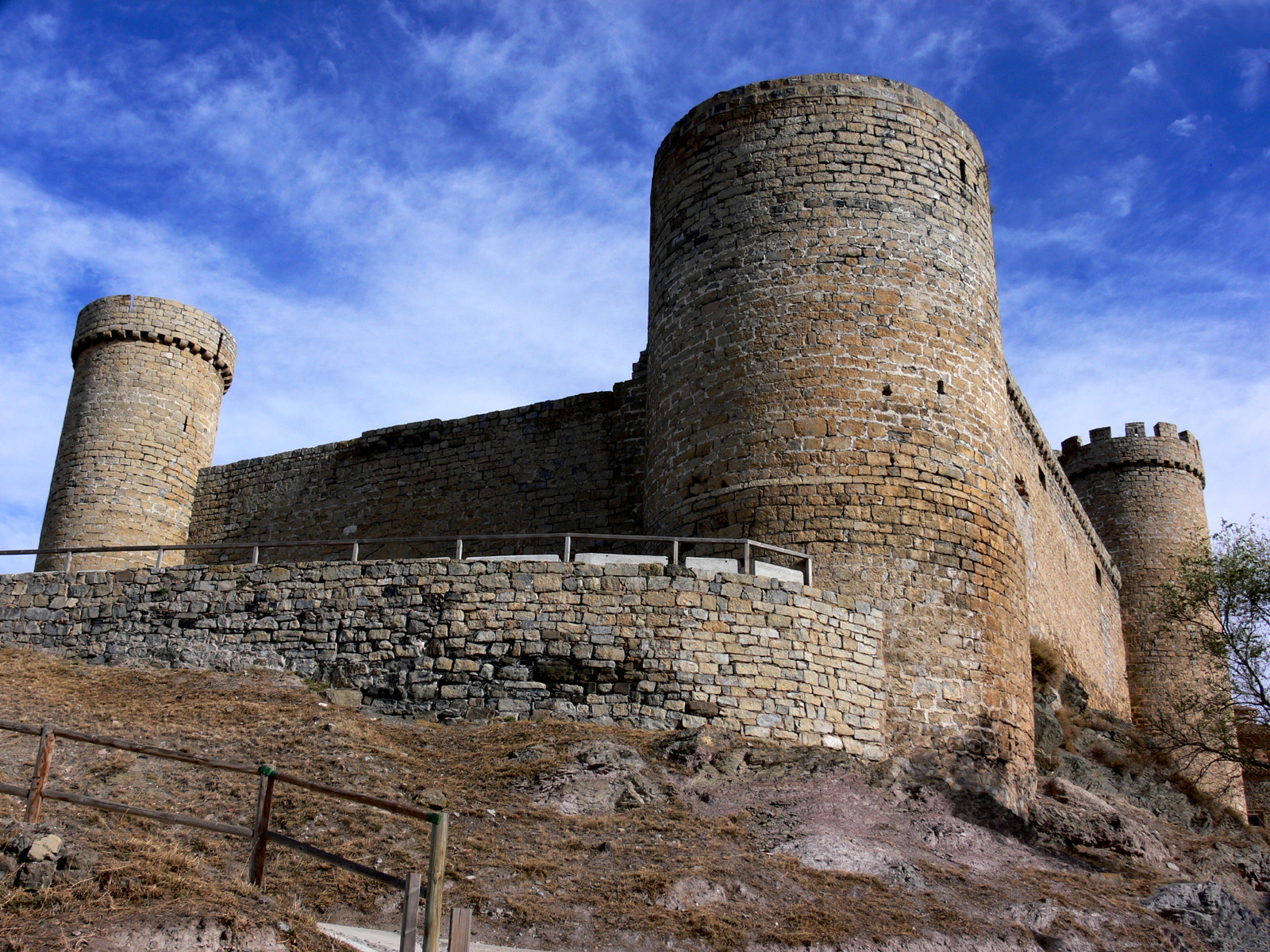
Castle

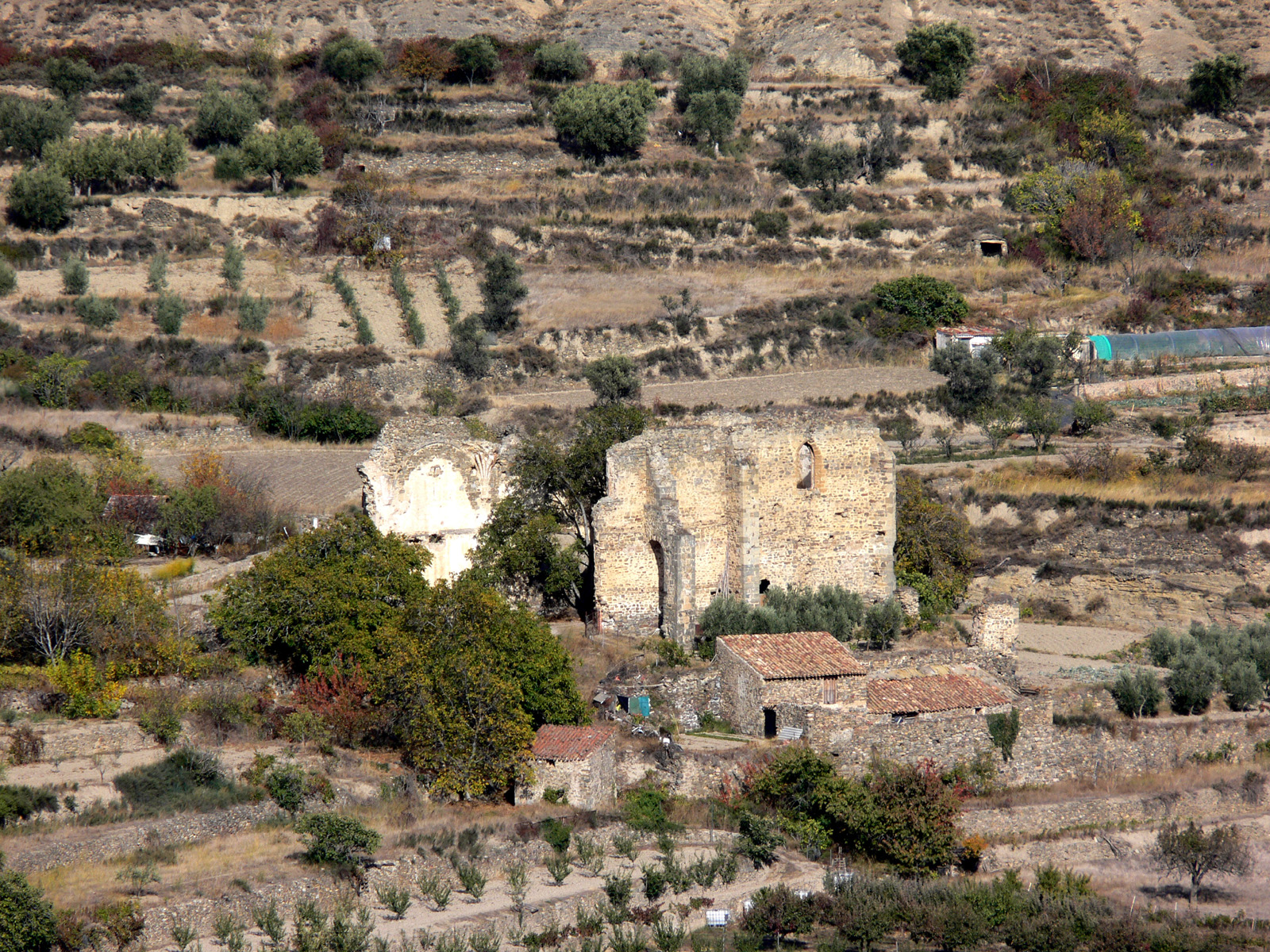
Remains of the monastery of Our Lady of Campolapuente

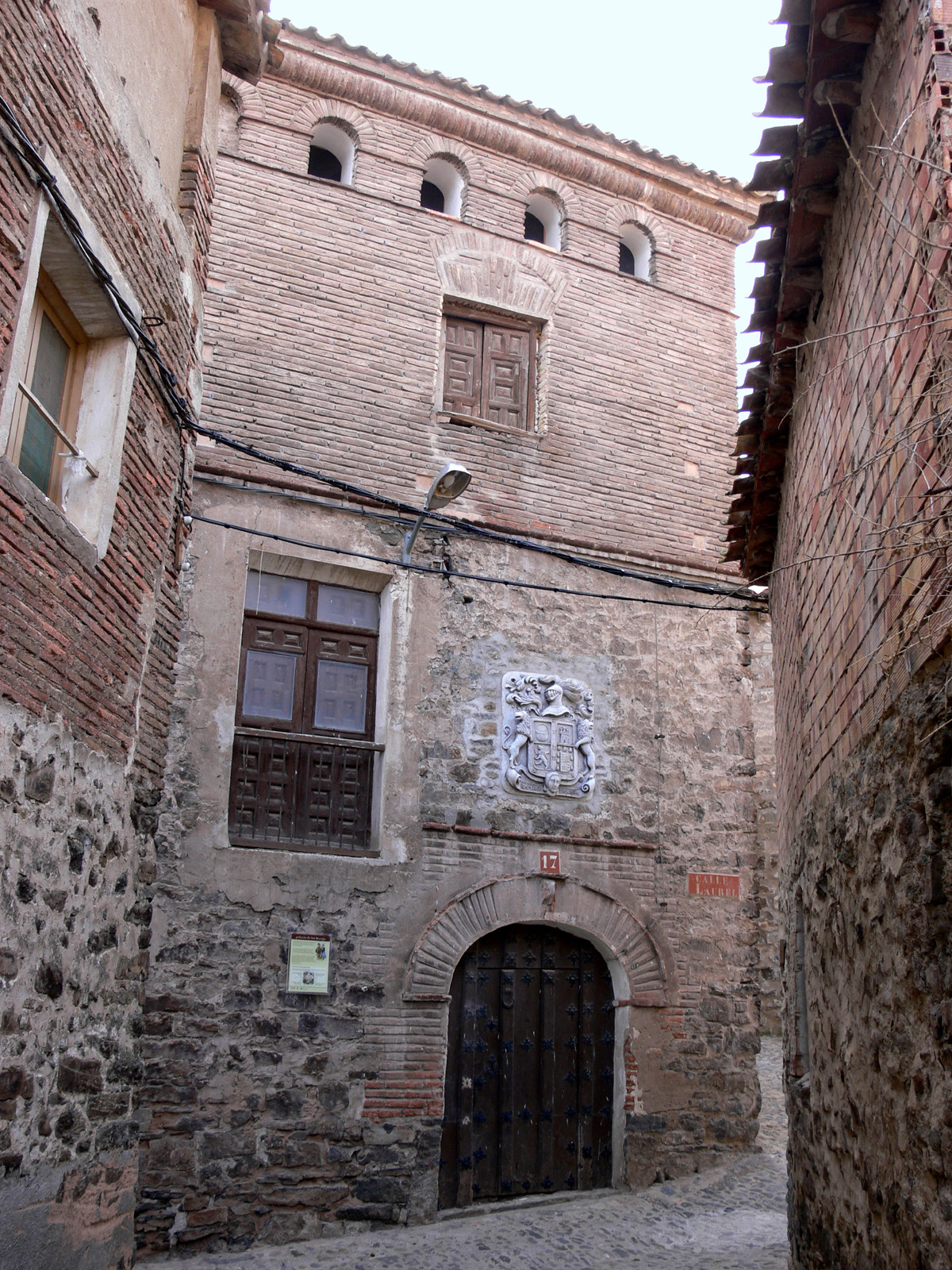
Palace of the Baroja family

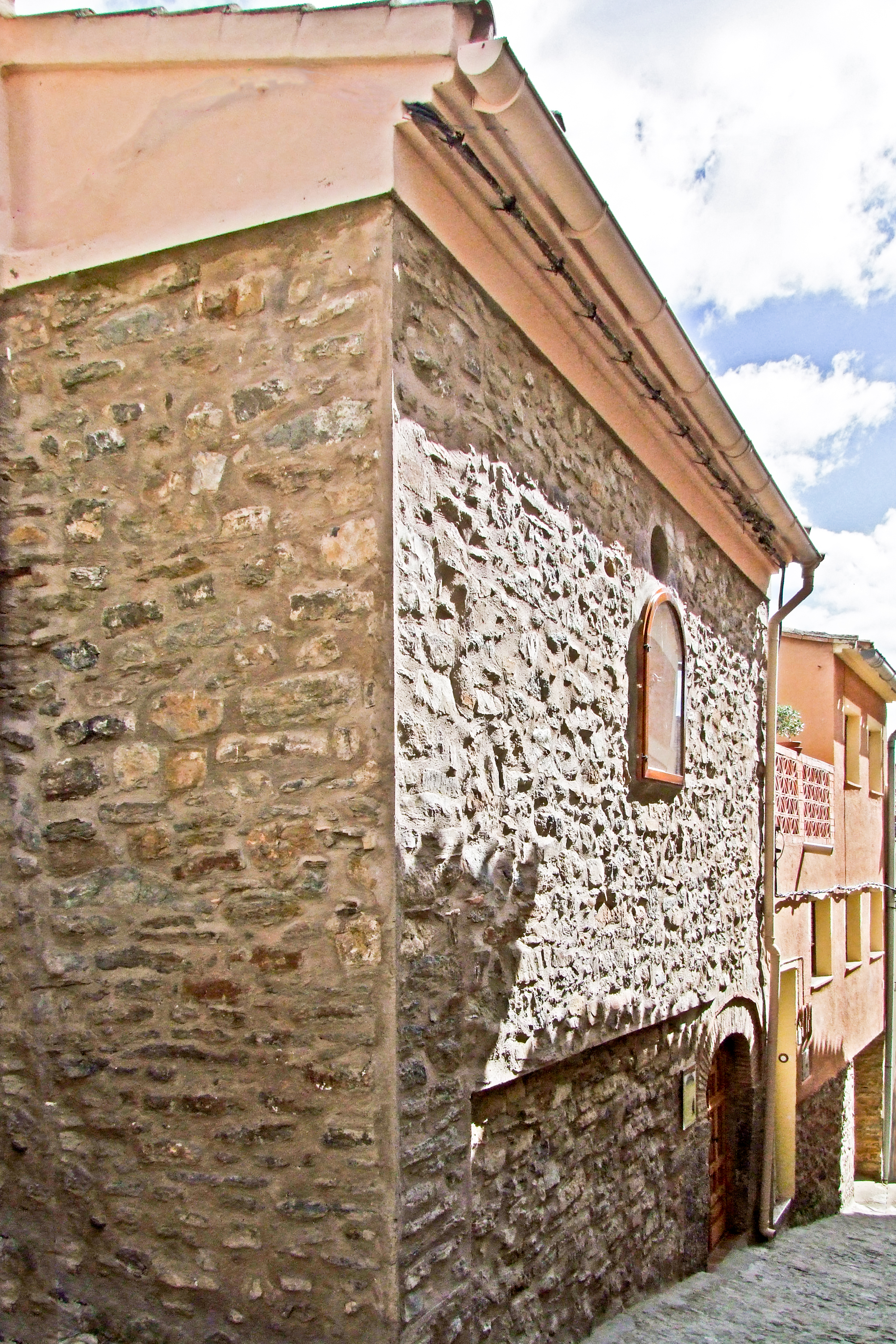
Ermita de Santa Catalina

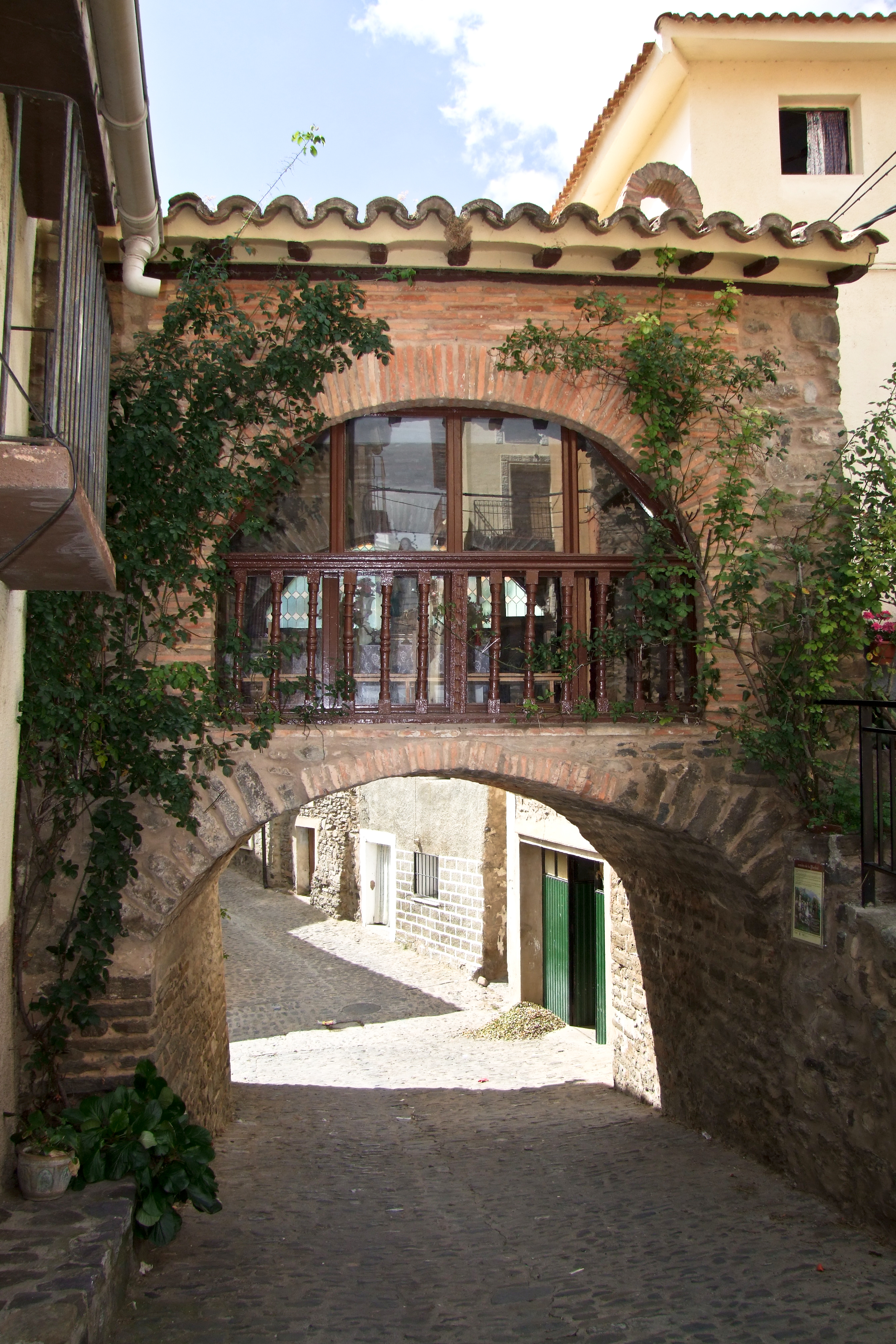
Ermita de la Piedad

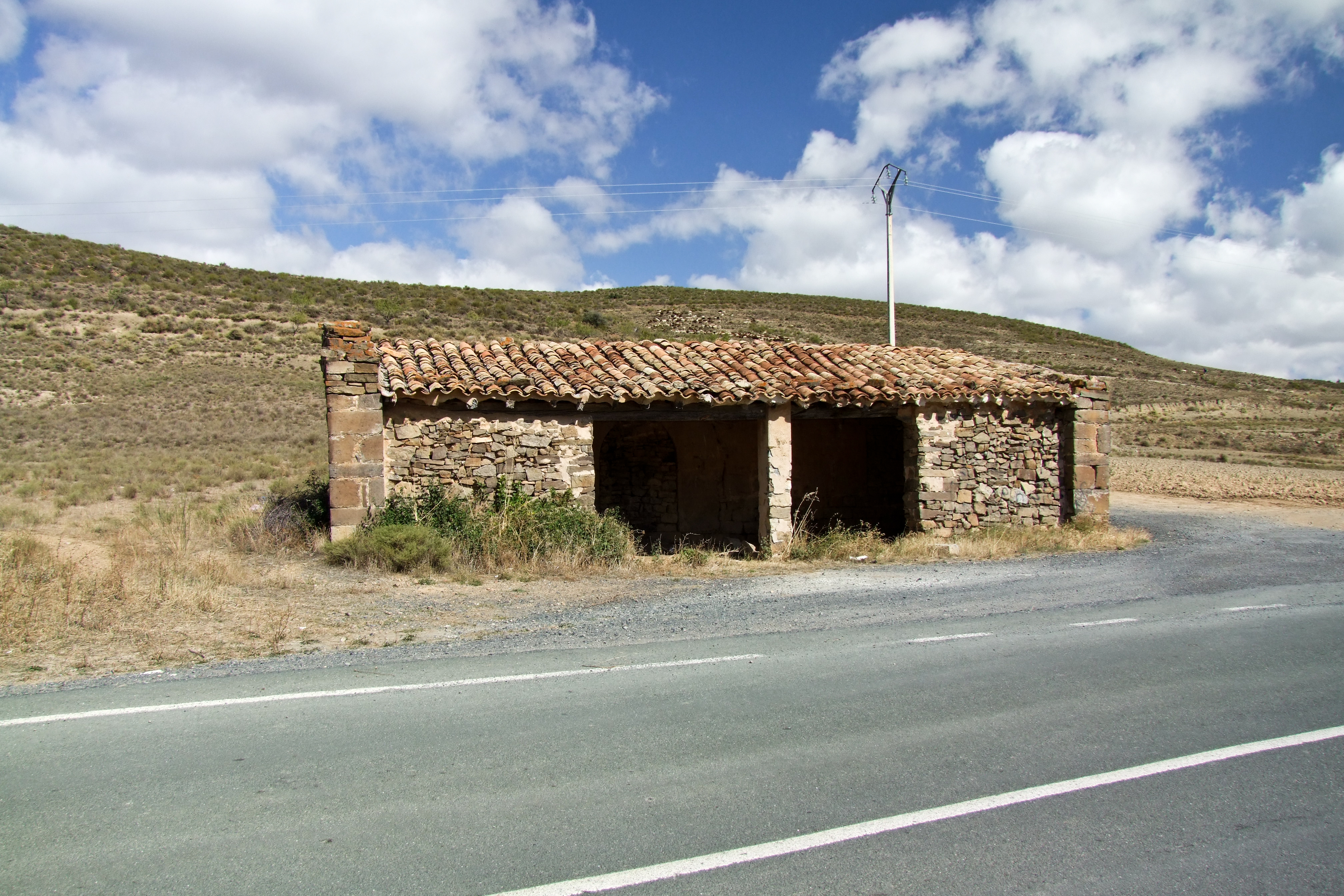
Ermita de Santa Ana

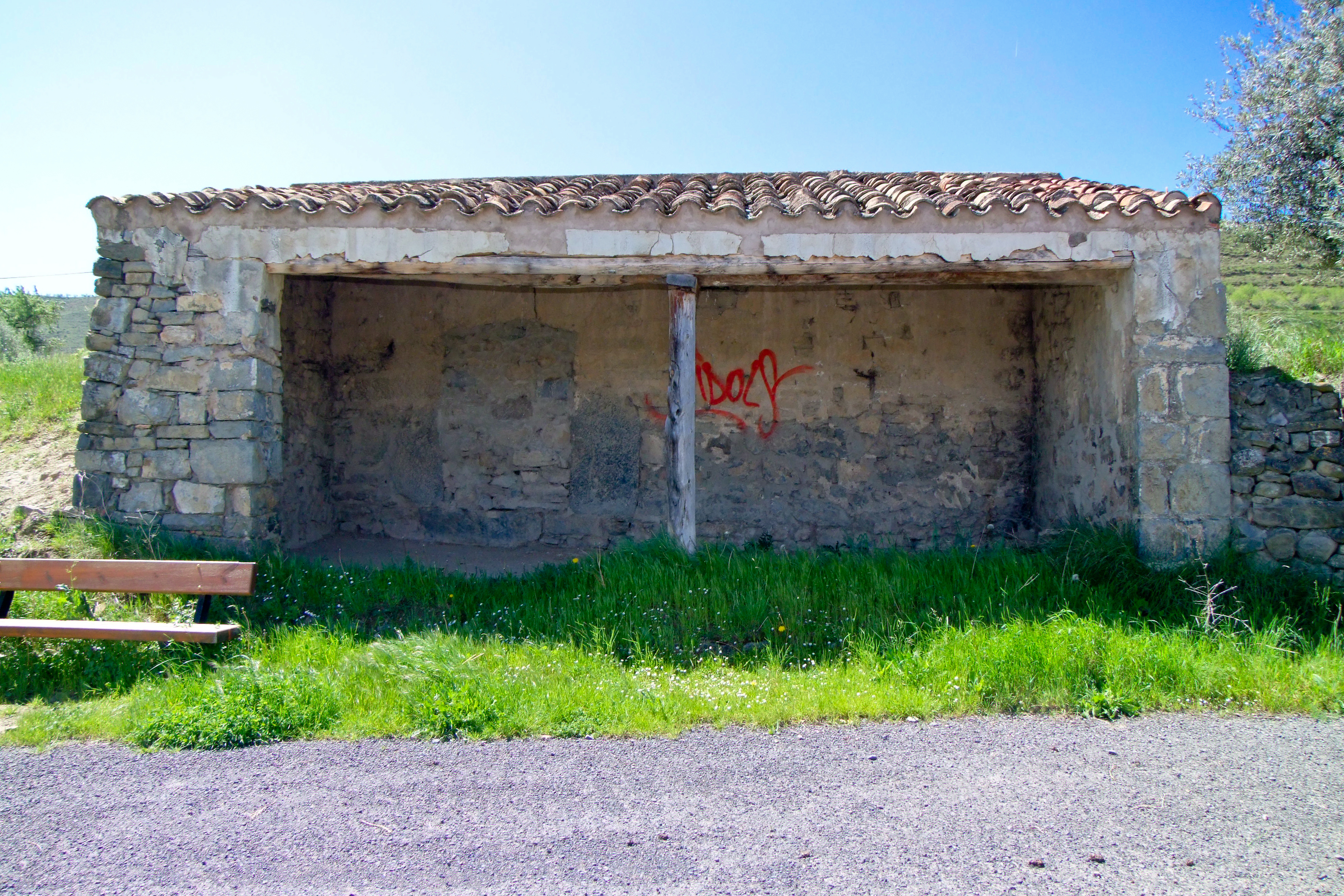
Hermitage of Saint Roch

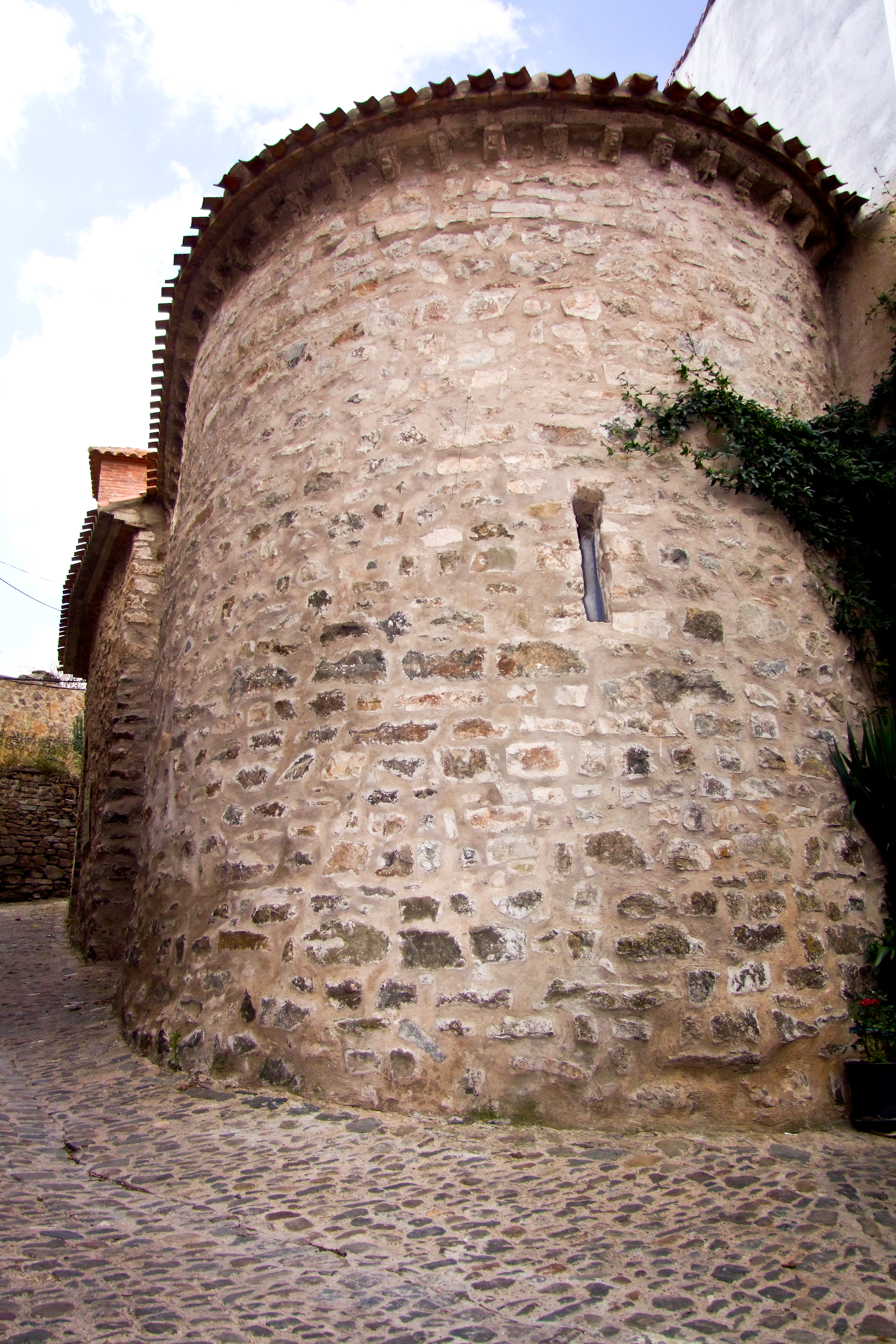
Hermitage of Saint Blaise

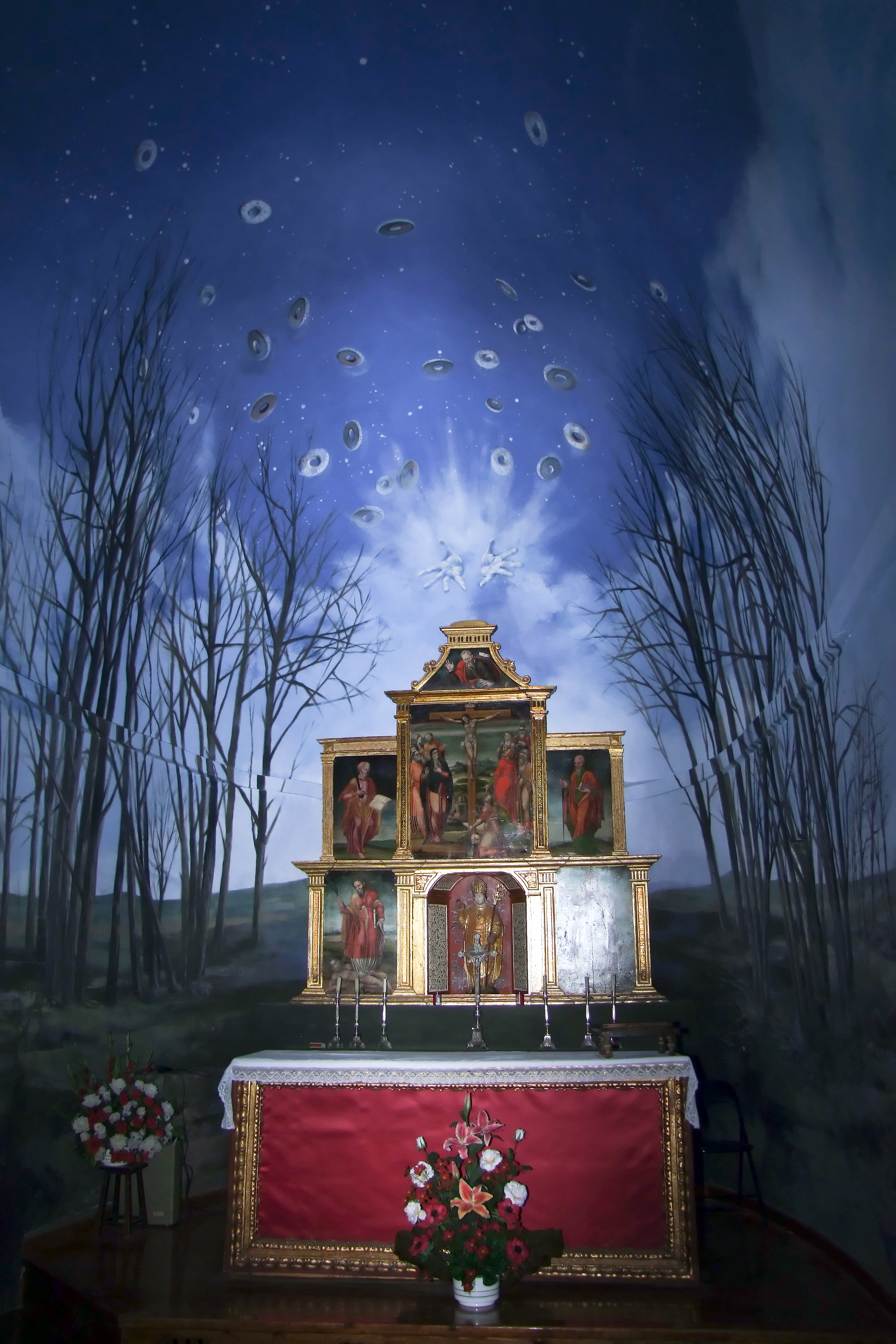
Hermitage of Saint Blaise

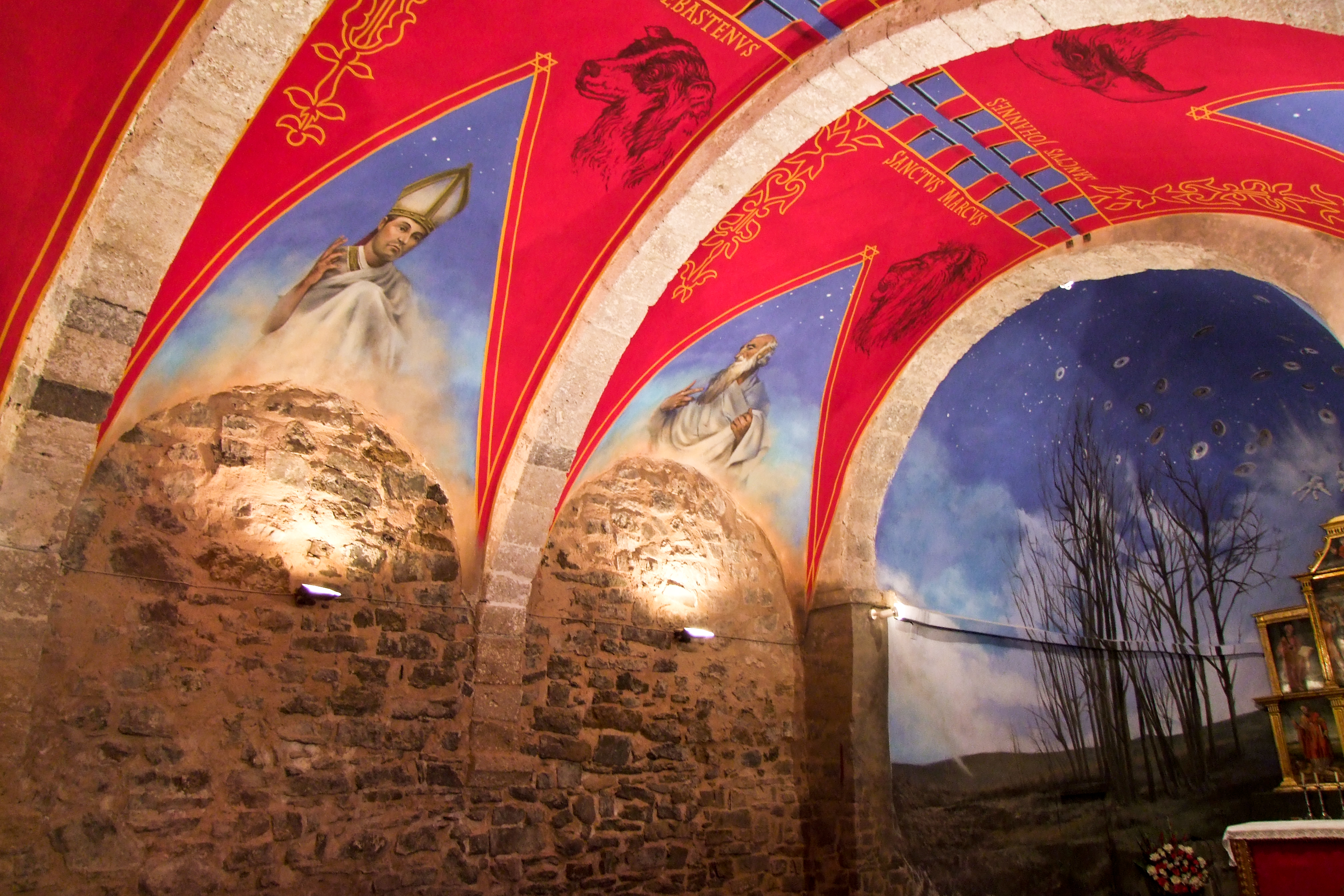
Hermitage of Saint Blaise

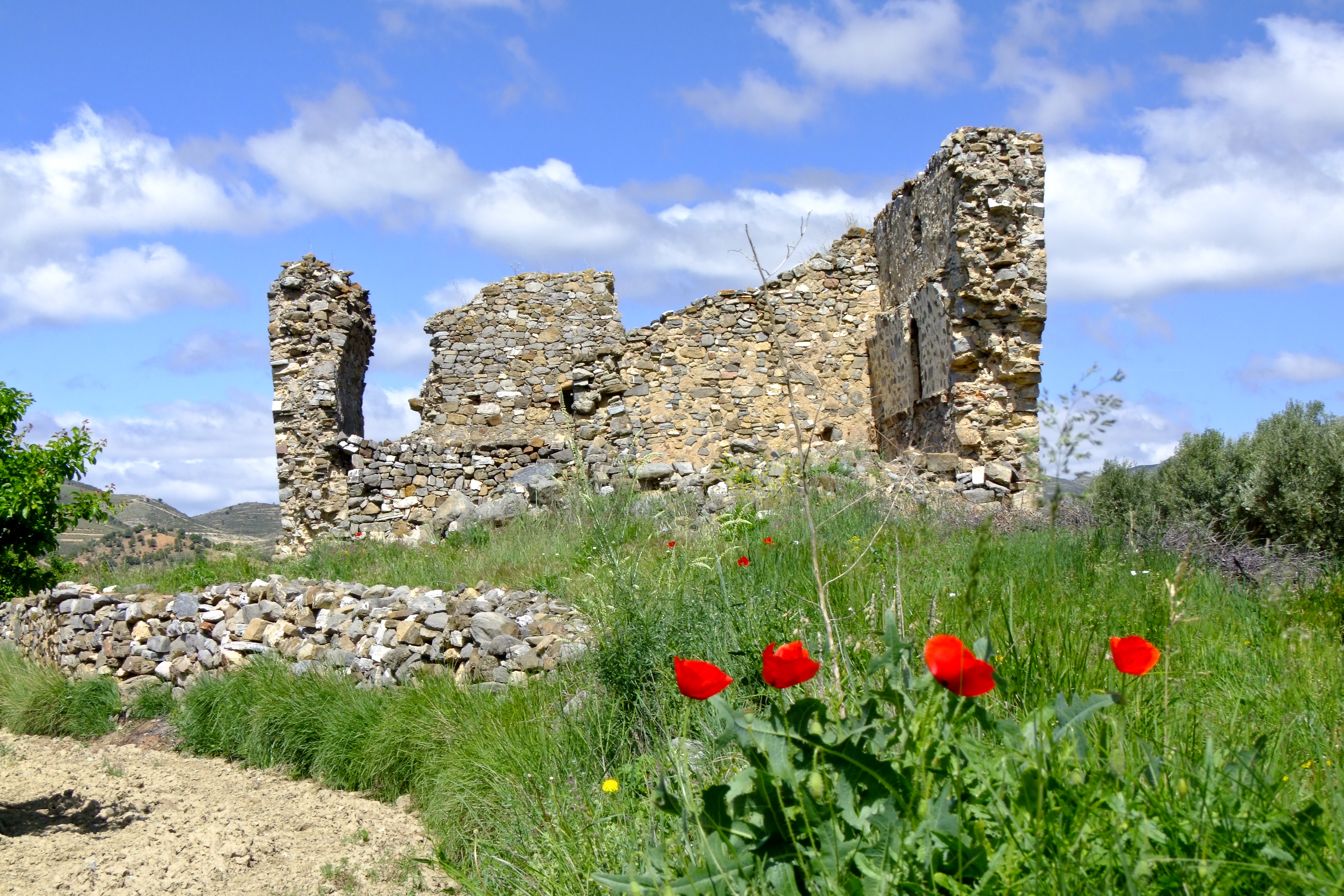
Hermitage of Saint Martin
