= Leiva, La Rioja =

Leiva
- Municipality
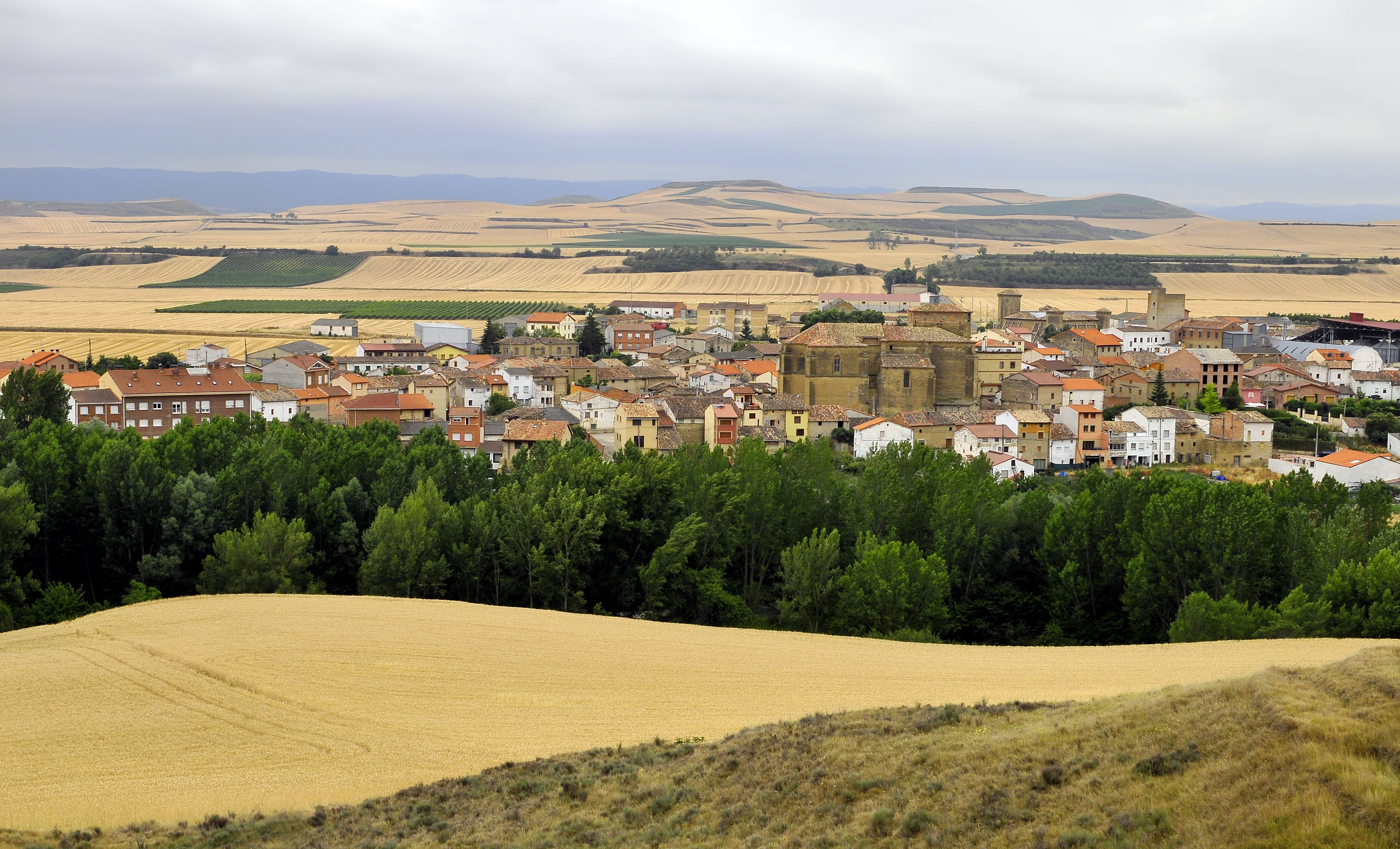
- Skyline of Leiva

- Coat of arms

- Location within La Rioja, Spain Location within Spain
- Coordinates: 42°30′13″N 3°02′47″W
- Country: Spain
- Autonomous community: La Rioja
- Comarca: Santo Domingo de la Calzada

Government
  - Mayor: José María Corcuera Briones (PP)

Area
  - Total: 12.71 km^{2} (4.91 sq mi)
- Elevation: 586 m (1,923 ft)

Population (2025-01-01)
  - Total: 235
- Postal code: 26213
- Website: www.aytoleiva.org

Leiva is a village in the province and autonomous community of La Rioja, Spain. The municipality covers an area of 12.71 square kilometres (4.91 sq mi) and as of 2011 had a population of 304 people.

== Places of interest ==
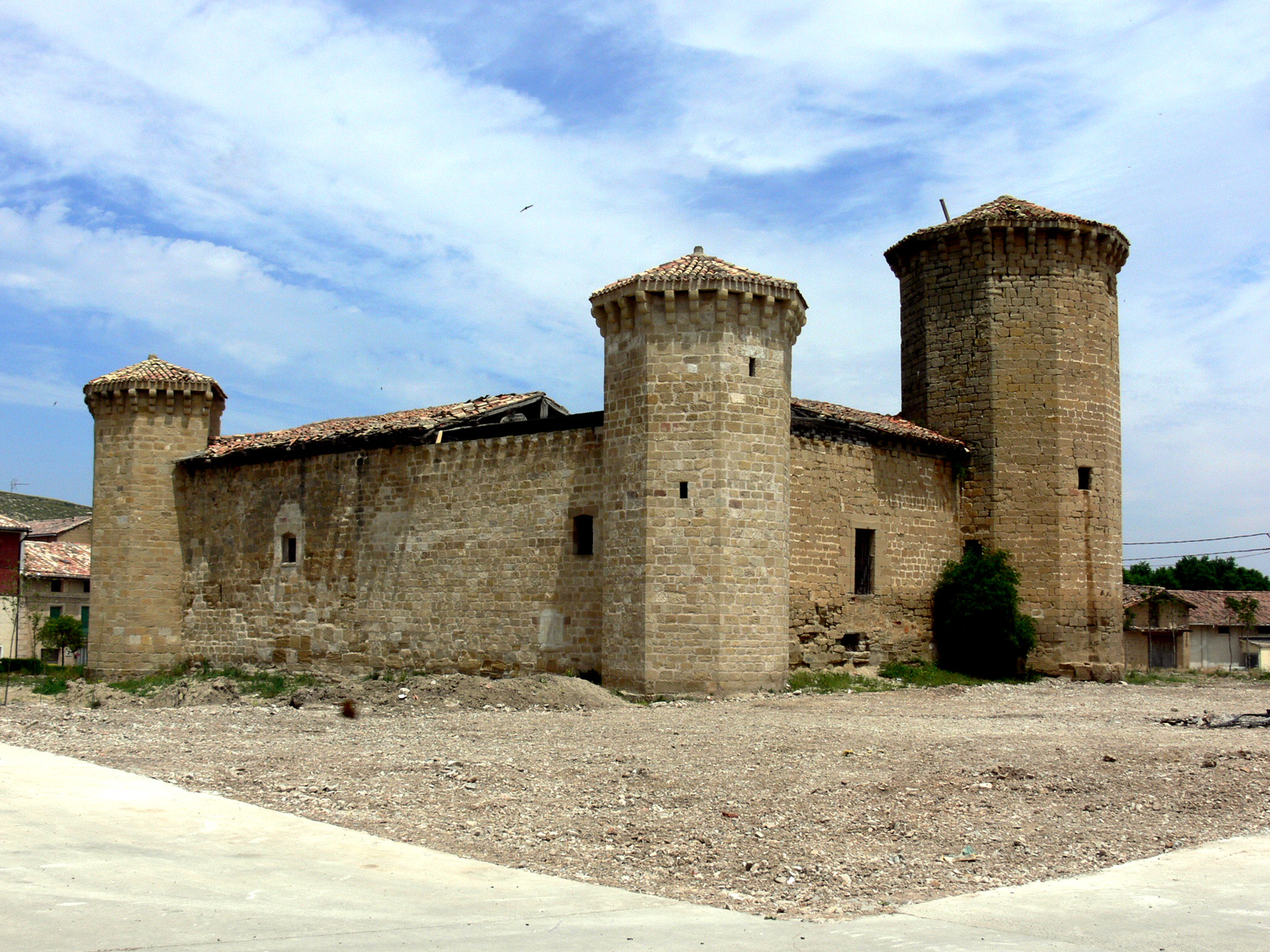
Castle of Leiva

- Castle of Leiva

== Notable people ==
- Antonio de Leyva, Duke of Terranova
- Jesús Miguel Alonso Chavarri. Writer.
