= Leza River Bridge =

- Puente Romano sobre el río Leza (Spanish)
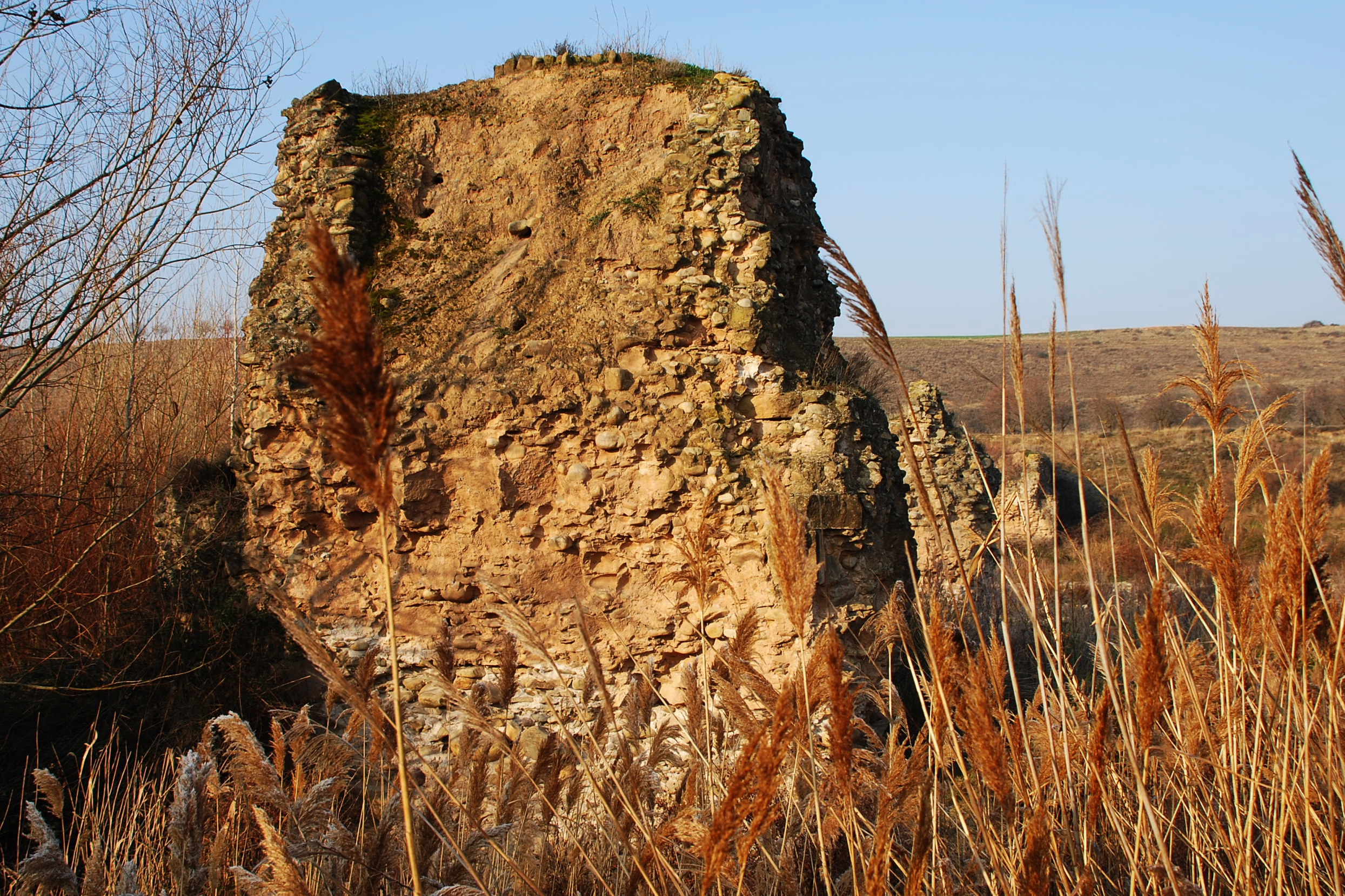

- Location within Spain
- 42.434879°N 2.308528°W
- Location: Agoncillo, Spain

Spanish Cultural Heritage
- Official name: Puente Romano sobre el río Leza
- Type: Non-movable
- Criteria: Monument
- Designated: 1981
- Reference no.: RI-51-0004524

The Leza River Bridge (Spanish: Puente Romano sobre el río Leza) is the ruins of a bridge located in Agoncillo, Spain. It was declared Bien de Interés Cultural in 1981.
