= Castle of Cornago =

Castle in La Rioja, Spain

- Castillo de Cornago (Spanish)
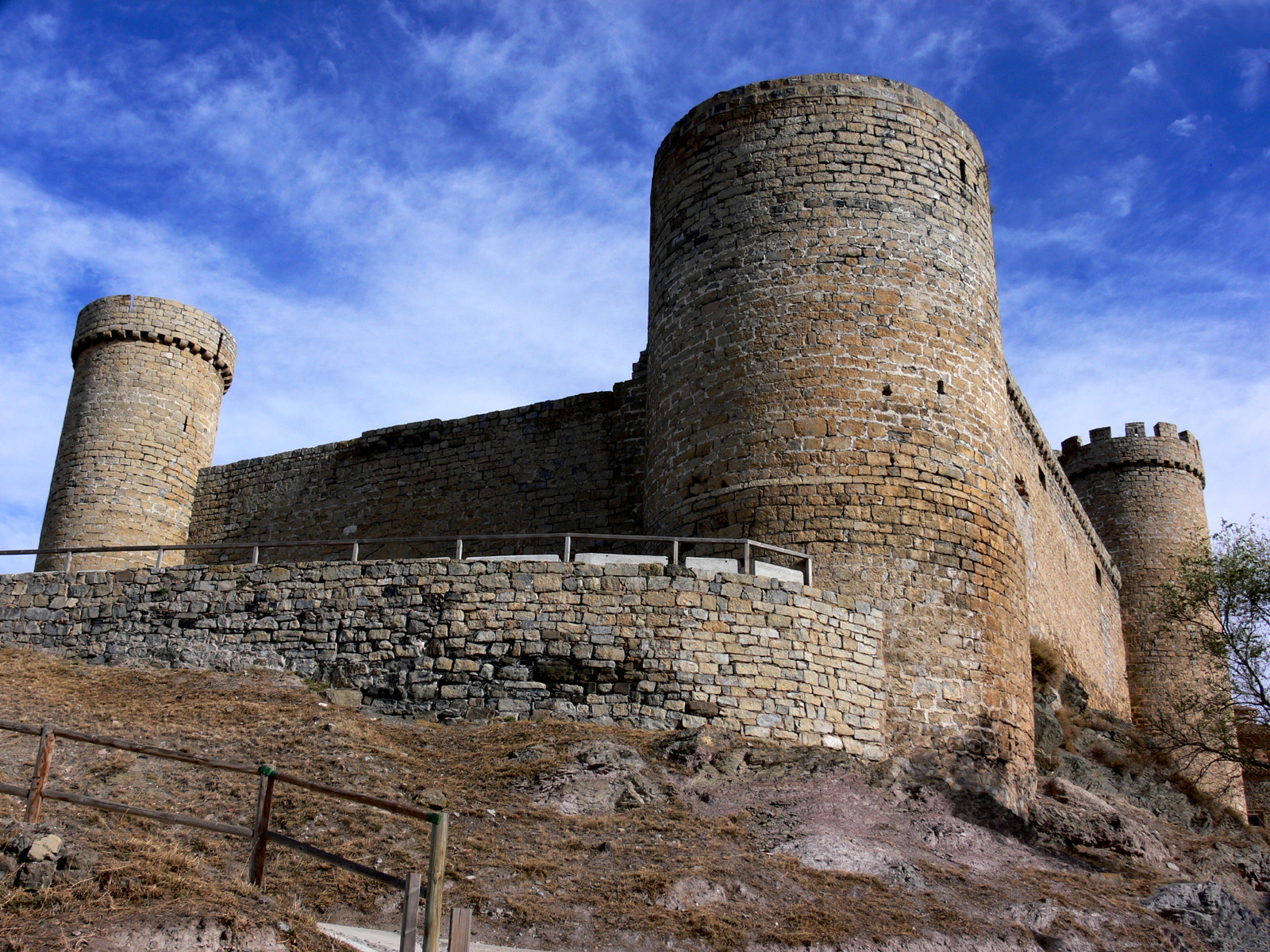
- Interactive map of Castle of Cornago
- Location: Cornago; La Rioja

History
- Built: 14th and 15th centuries

Spanish Cultural Heritage
- Official name: Castillo de Cornago
- Type: Non-movable
- Criteria: Monument
- Designated: 22 April 1949

The Castle of Cornago is located on the hilltop overlooking the town of Cornago in La Rioja, Spain. Its walls reveal a solid construction which should have been proved very useful during the wars of the Middle Ages.

It belonged to Álvaro de Luna, who held, among other titles, the title of Lord of Jubera and Cornago.

== Bibliography ==
- Goicoechea, Cesáreo (1949). Castillos de la Rioja, notas descriptivas e históricas (in Spanish). Logroño. p. 125. ISBN 84-398-9272-1.
