= Quel, La Rioja =

Quel
- Municipality
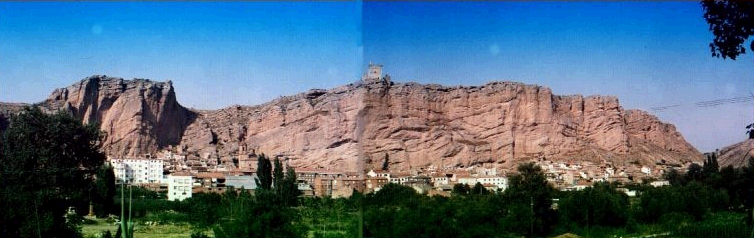
- Skyline of Quel

- Flag Coat of arms

- Location within La Rioja, Spain Location within Spain
- Coordinates: 42°13′44″N 2°02′59″W
- Country: Spain
- Autonomous community: La Rioja
- Comarca: Arnedo

Government
  - Mayor: Víctor Manuel Rada Resano (PP)

Area
  - Total: 54.78 km^{2} (21.15 sq mi)
- Elevation: 492 m (1,614 ft)

Population (2025-01-01)
  - Total: 2,128
- Postal code: 26570
- Website: www.quel.org

Quel is a village in the province and autonomous community of La Rioja, Spain. The municipality covers an area of 54.78 square kilometres (21.15 sq mi) and as of 2011 had a population of 2096 people.

Quel is known for its castle, which overlooks the town from atop a steep hill. The village's name is derived from the Arabic قَلْعَة (qalat), meaning "castle" or "fortress."
