= Castle of Quel =

Castle in La Rioja, Spain

- Castillo de Quel (Spanish)
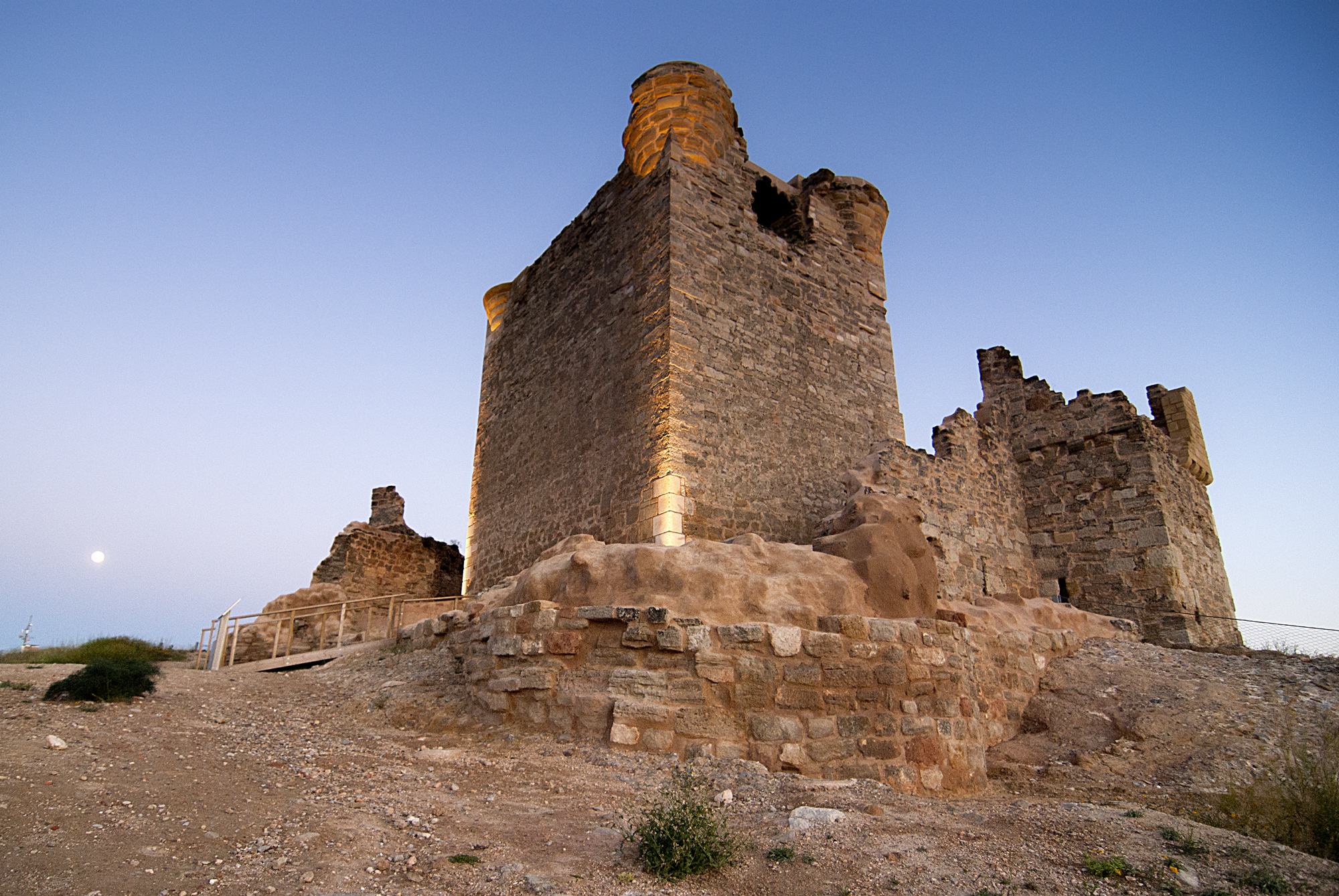
- Castle of Quel

- Location within Spain
- 42.2285°N 2.0485°W
- Location: Quel; Spain

History
- Founder: García Sánchez of Alfaro
- Built: 1470

Site notes
- Height: 100 metres (330 ft)

The castle of Quel is a fortress built in the year 1470. It is located in Quel, La Rioja (Spain).

== Location ==
Located on a hill with gentle slopes on the north face and steep slopes in the south. It has a height of more than 100 metres (330 ft), which allowed it to watch and communicate with other fortress like the Castle of Autol and the Castle of Arnedo. This hilltop allowed the troops posted in the castle having to defend just three sides, out of the four, in case of attack.

17 November 1971 the Tax Department of Logroño auctioned it for 19.350 pesetas, being acquired by a group of businessmen who wanted to develop touristic projects which were never carried out.

== Structure ==
The castle of Quel has two parts:

- the main Tower
- the walls.

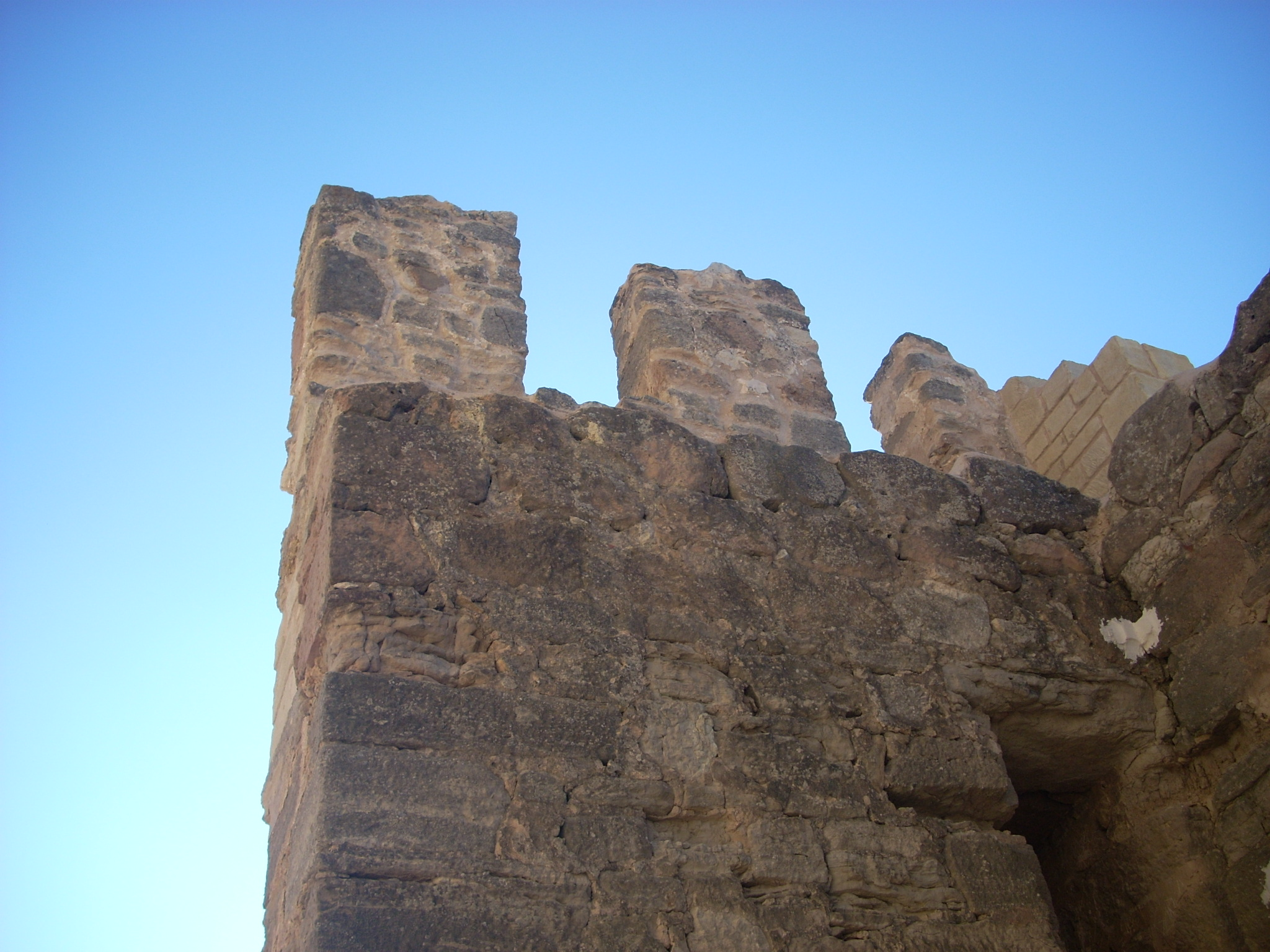
Walls.

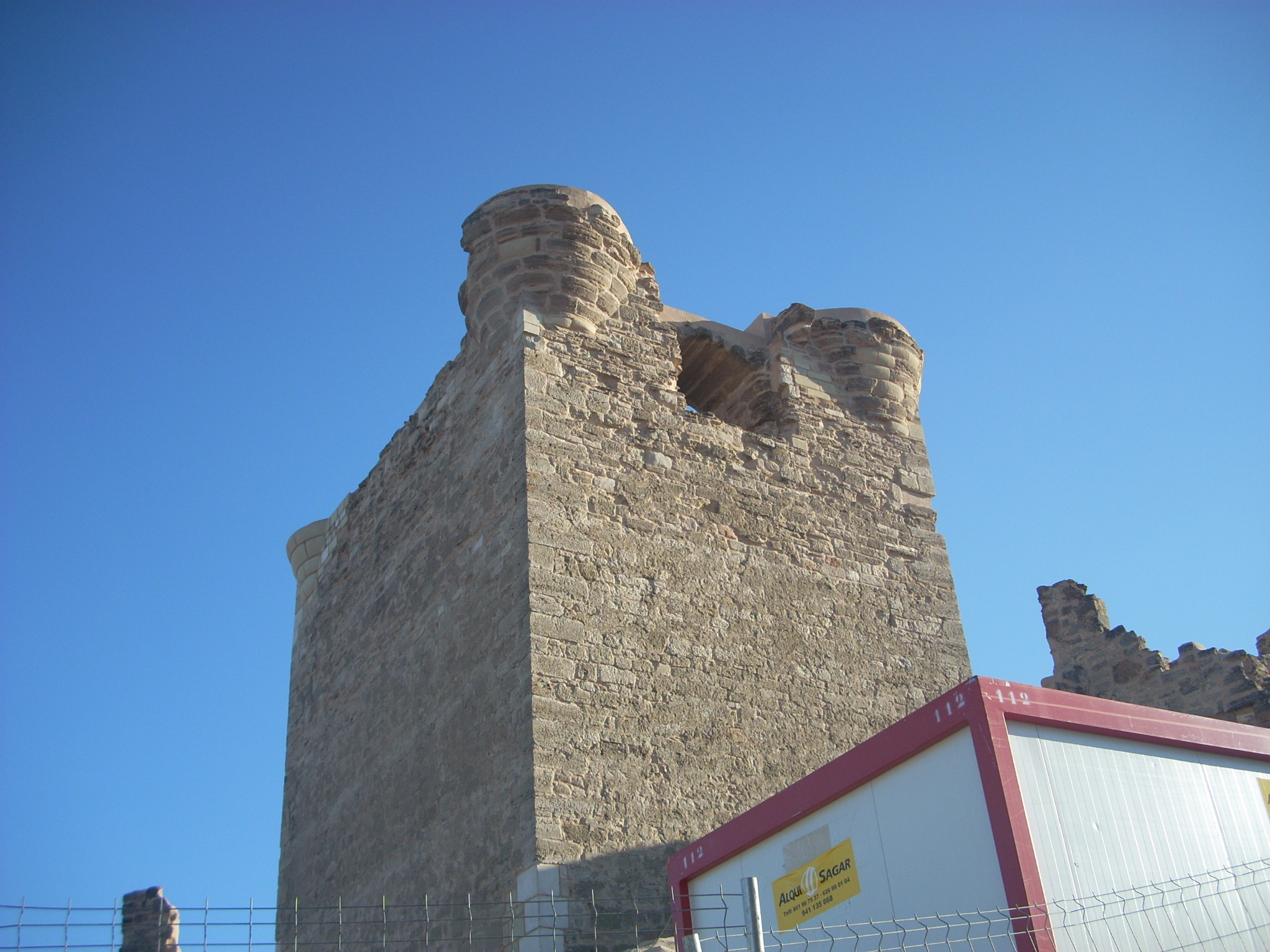
Main Tower.
