= Hervías =

- Municipality
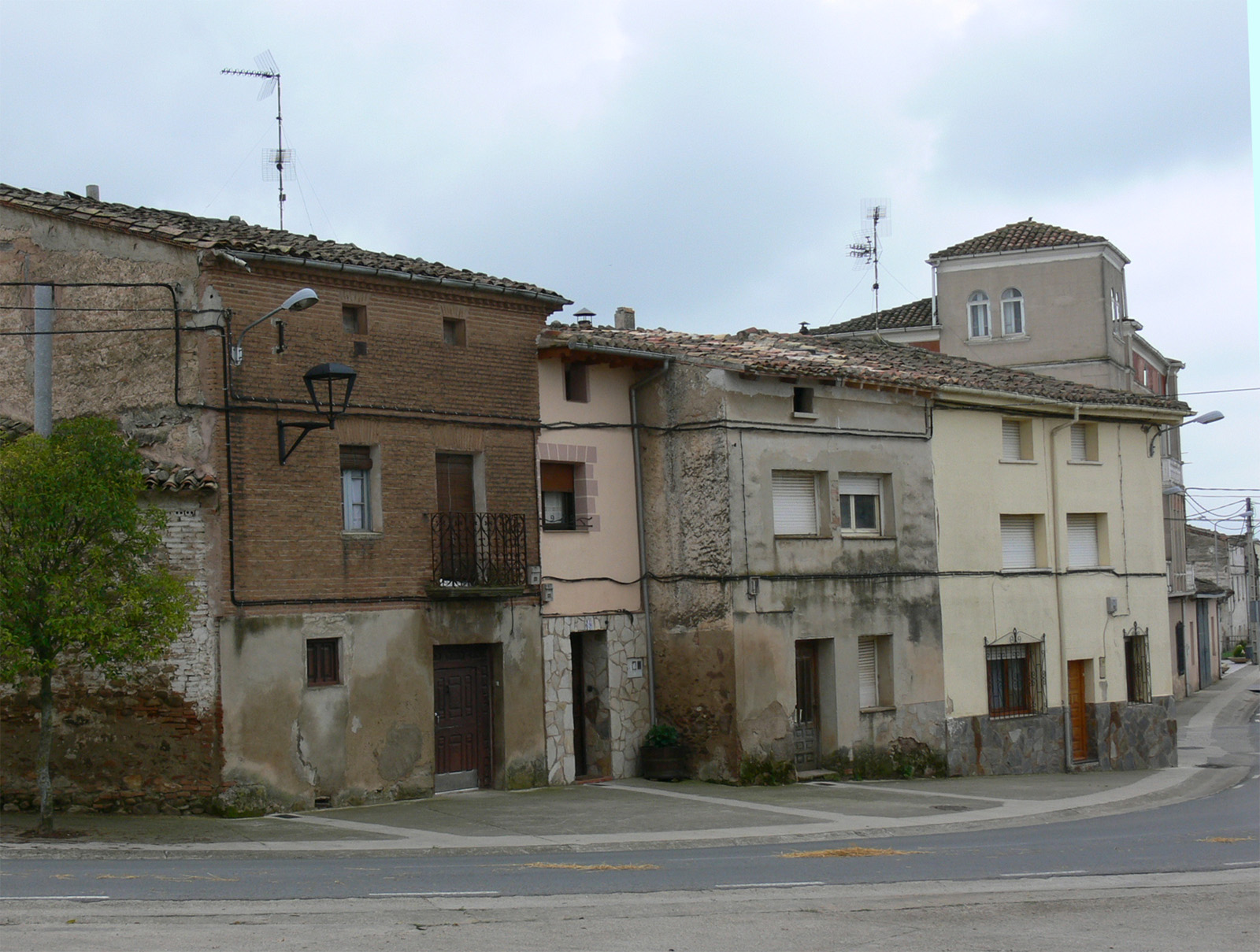
- Town center

- Location within La Rioja, Spain Location within Spain
- Coordinates: 42°26′52″N 2°53′14″W
- Country: Spain
- Autonomous community: La Rioja
- Comarca: Santo Domingo de la Calzada

Government
  - Mayor: María Elena Concepción Martínez Aguirre (PP)

Area
  - Total: 14.14 km^{2} (5.46 sq mi)
- Elevation: 641 m (2,103 ft)

Population (2025-01-01)
  - Total: 138
- Demonym: hervienses
- Postal code: 26257
- Website: Official website

Hervías is a village in the province and autonomous community of La Rioja, Spain. The municipality covers an area of 14.14 square kilometres (5.46 sq mi) and as of 2011 had a population of 147 people.
