= Castle of Leiva =

Fortification in La Rioja, Spain

Coordinates: 42°30′05″N 3°02′52″W

- Castillo de Leiva (Spanish)
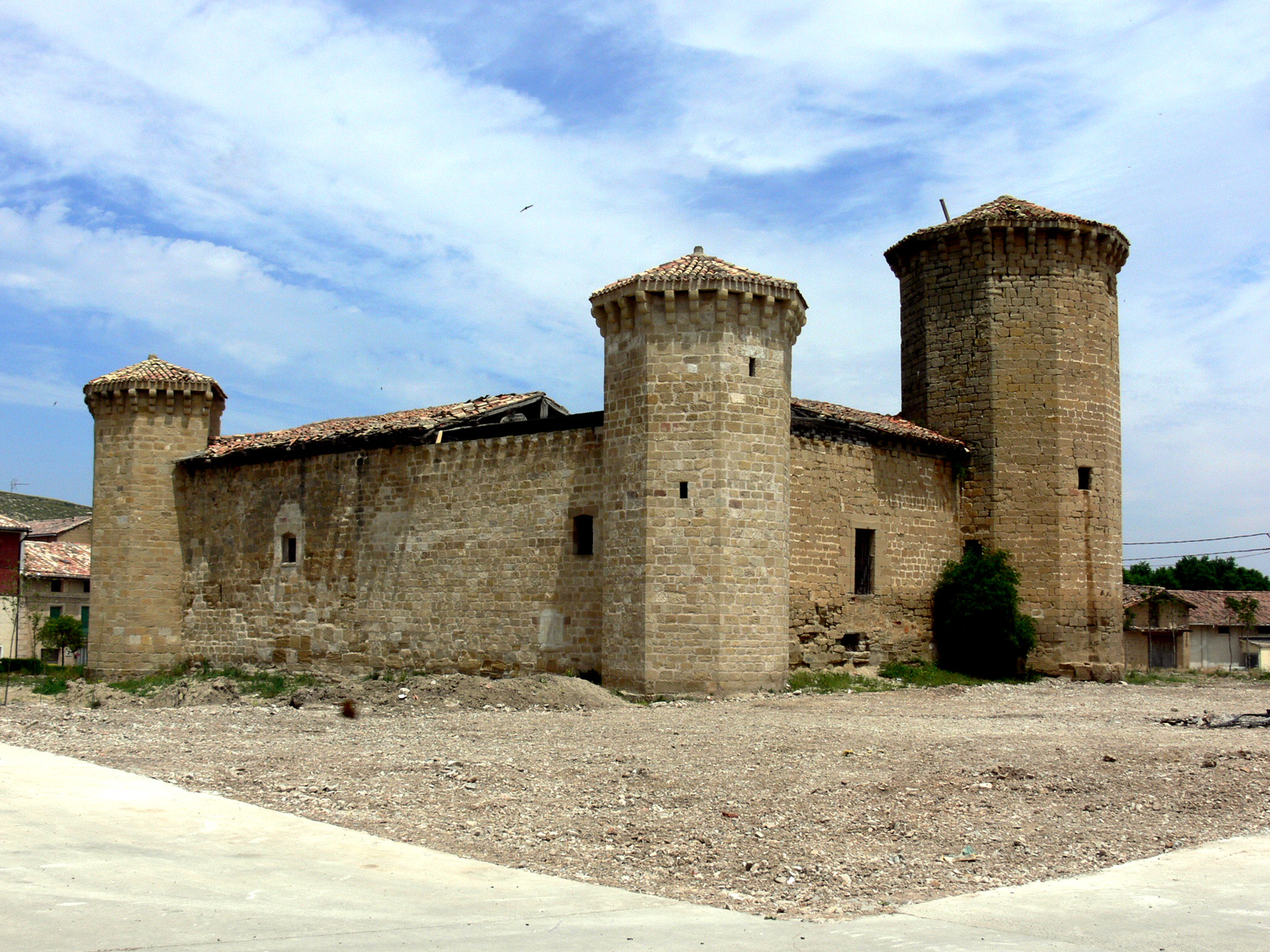
- Interactive map of Castle of Leiva
- Location: Leiva; La Rioja

History
- Built: 14th and 15th centuries

The Castillo of Leiva is a fortification located in Leiva, La Rioja (Spain).

== Description ==
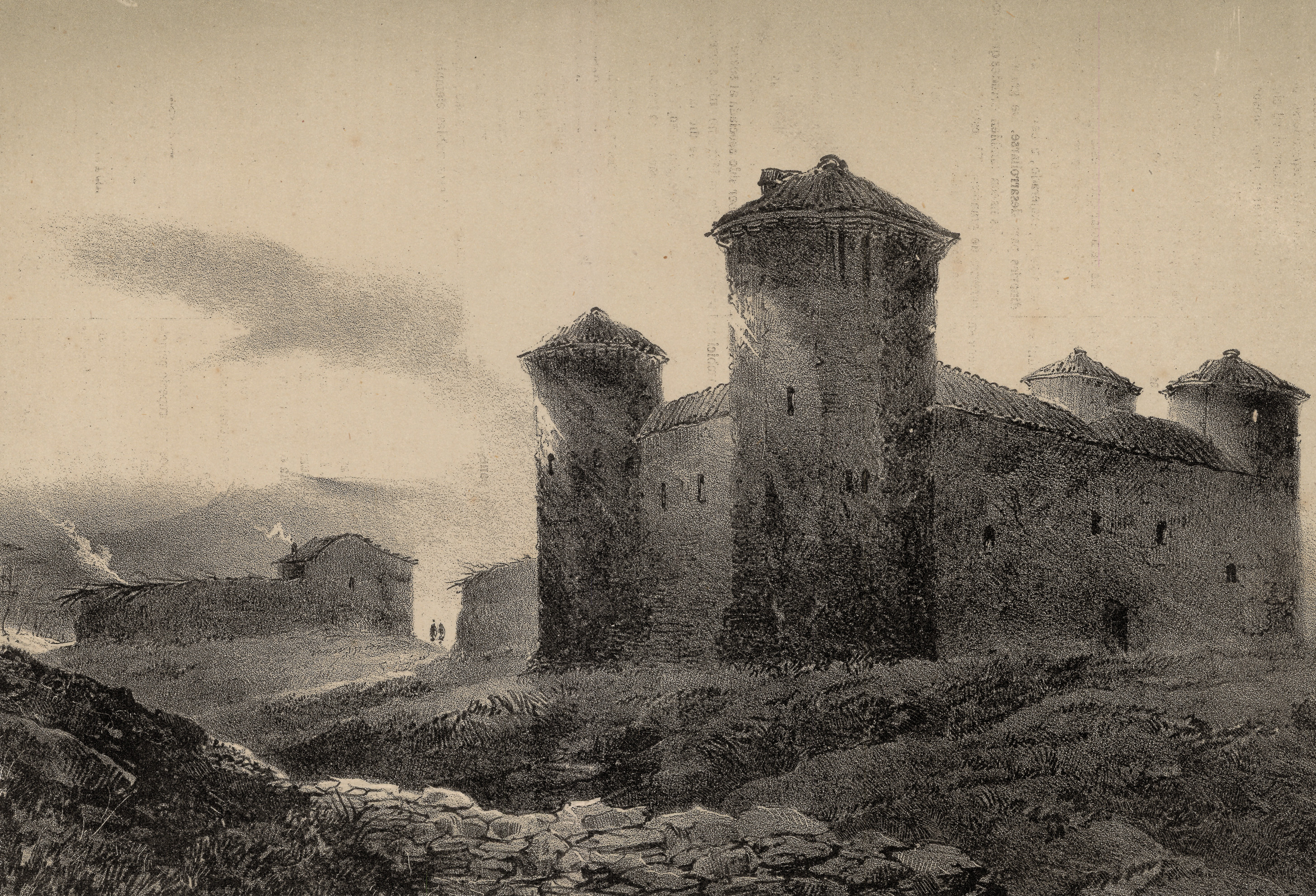
View of the castle in a lithograph by Pedro Pérez de Castro (19th century)

Located in the municipality of Leiva, in the autonomous community of La Rioja, (Spain). Fortified palace flanked by four octagonal towers, one in each corner, and surrounded by moans. It seems its architectures dates from the 14th and 15th centuries. It was home to the house of Leiva.

== Bibliography ==
- Goicoechea, Cesáreo (1949). Castillos de la Rioja, notas descriptivas e históricas (in Spanish). Logroño. pp. 125 pp. ISBN 84-398-9272-1.
