= Rioja style potatoes =

Spanish potato dish

Rioja style potatoes or patatas a la Riojana is a dish from Spanish cuisine, popular in the region of La Rioja and the province of Álava in the Basque Country of Spain. It is made with bell peppers, chorizo sausage and potatoes. The sauce is simple, and thickened by the potato starch. Other ingredients like bay leaves, pimenton and mushrooms may be added. Red wines complement this dish.

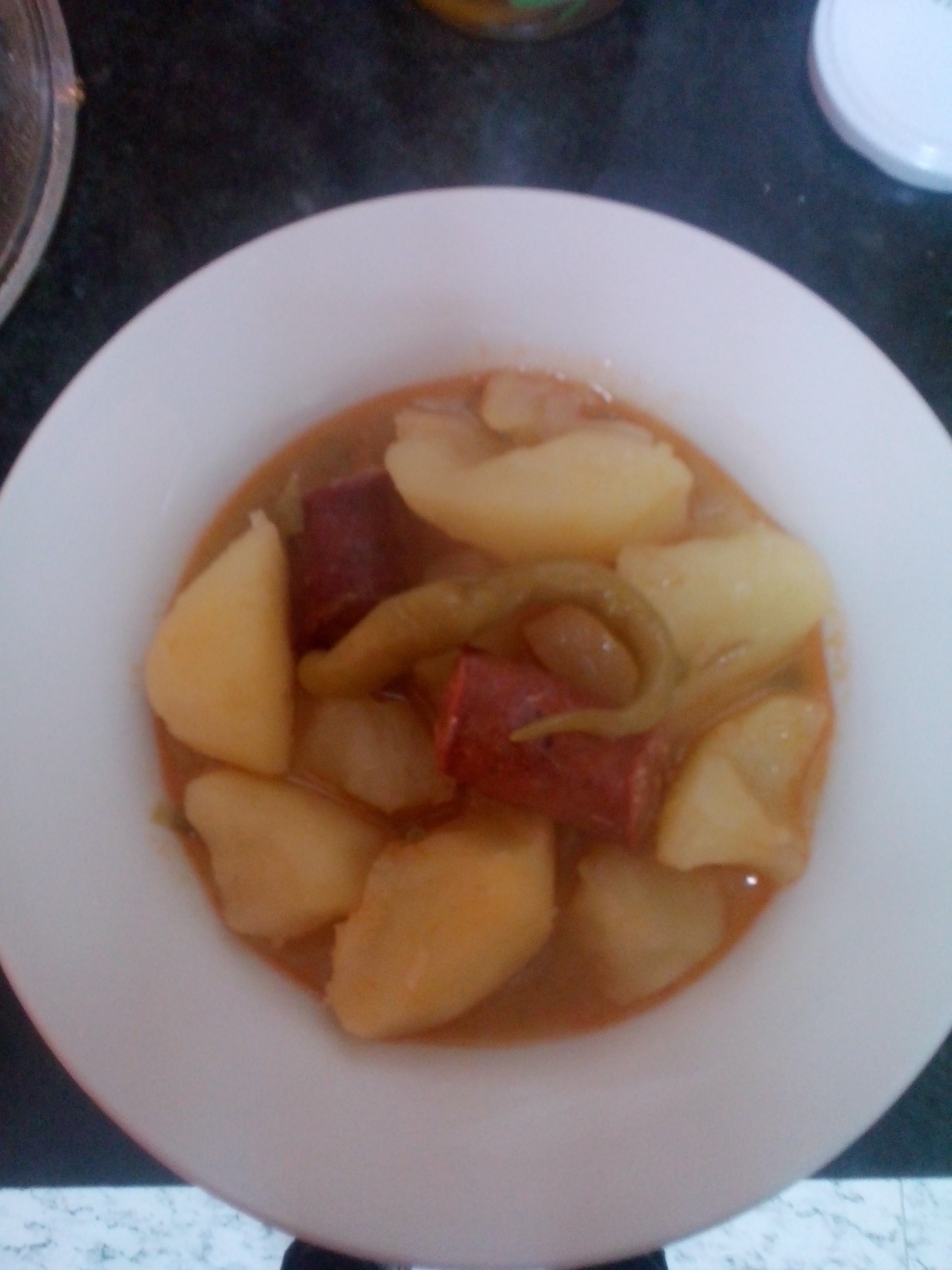
Finished dish

== History ==
It is not known when it was first made. However, potatoes were not used in soups in Spain until Napoleon's invasion, so it was not until at least the 19th century that this dish was eaten there. It is also said that Chef Paul Bocuse tasted this stew in a famous winery, and after three servings, told everybody that Riojan style potatoes were the best food he had ever eaten. The chef also recommended this dish to be the national dish of Spain. Rioja style potatoes are usually served in the areas of Alava and Rioja.

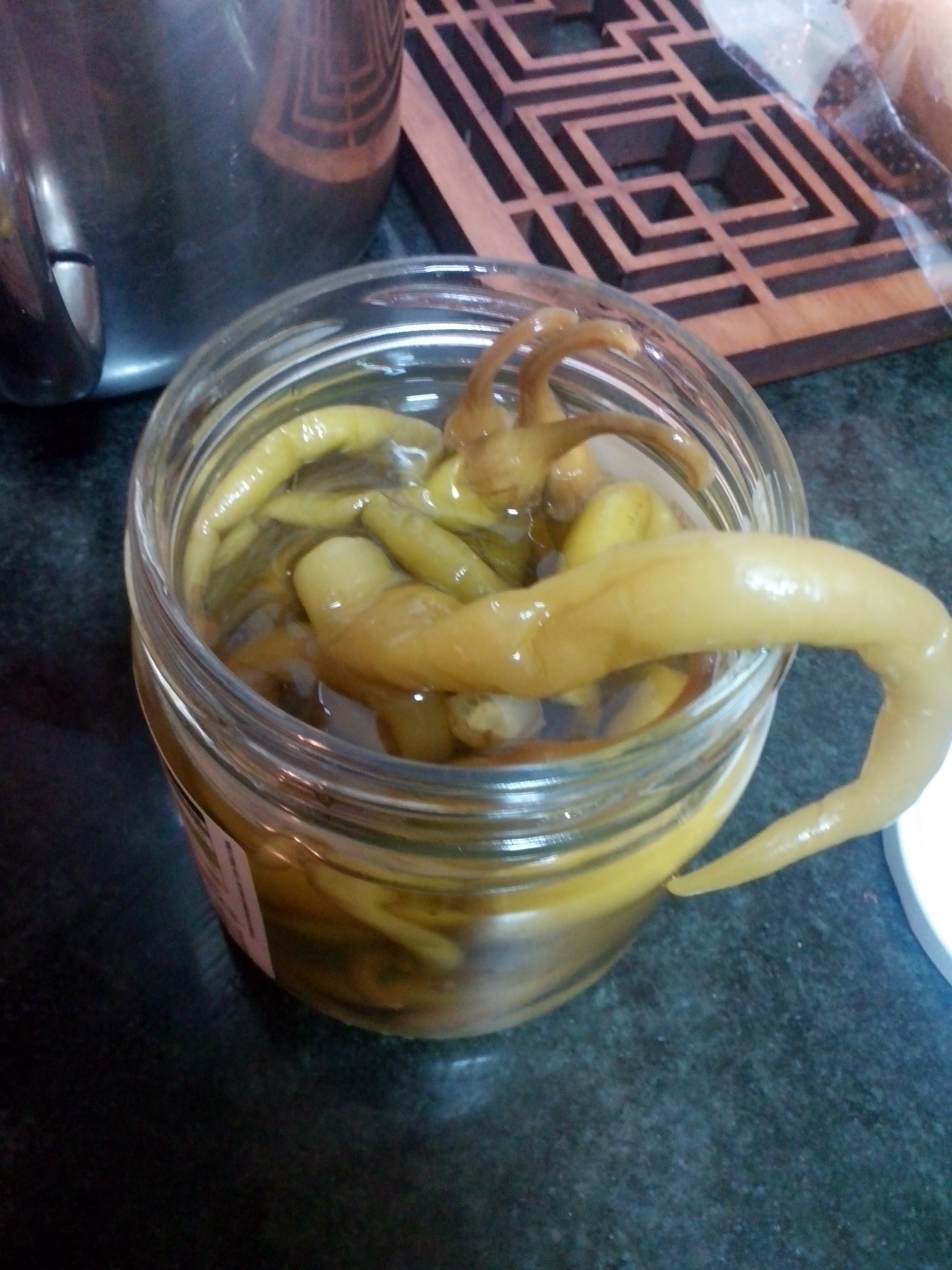
Green peppers or green chilli peppers may be used.
