= Church of San Martín (Entrena) =

- Iglesia Parroquial de San Martín (Spanish)
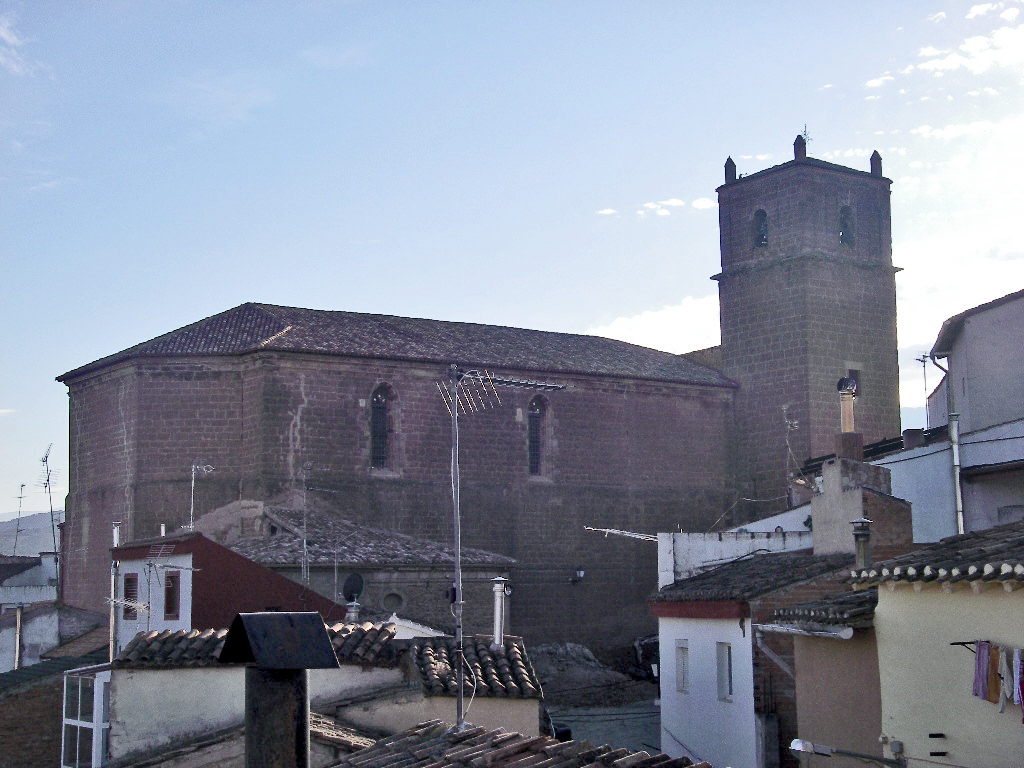

- Location within Spain
- 42.38862°N 2.531329°W
- Location: Entrena, Spain

Spanish Cultural Heritage
- Official name: Iglesia Parroquial de San Martín
- Type: Non-movable
- Criteria: Monument
- Designated: 1984
- Reference no.: RI-51-0005036

The Church of San Martín (Spanish: Iglesia Parroquial de San Martín) is a church located in Entrena, Spain. The church was constructed during the 17th century. It was declared Bien de Interés Cultural in 1984.
