= Aguilar del Río Alhama =

- Municipality
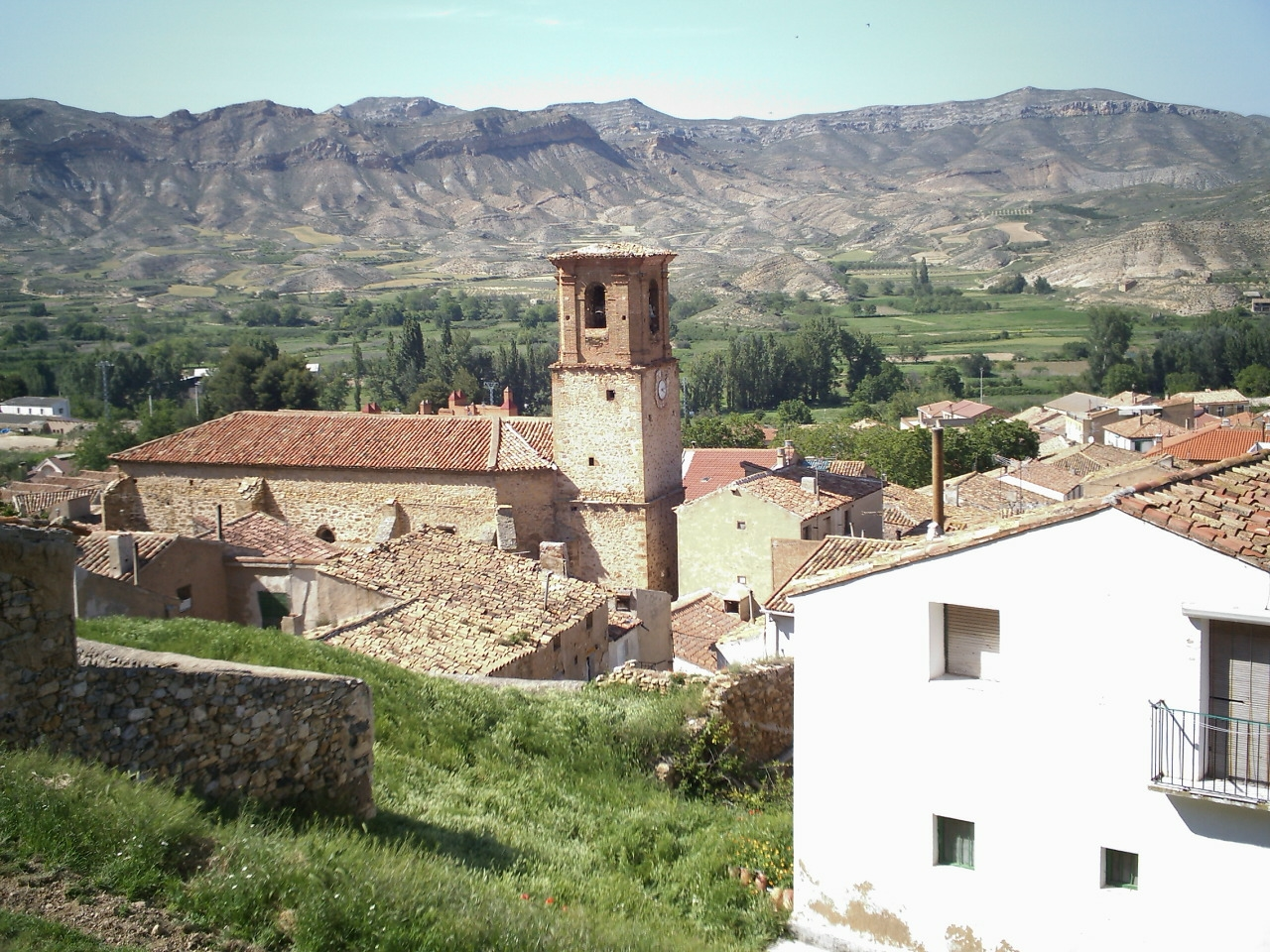
- Panoramic view of the village and the Asunción church

- Location in La Rioja Location in Spain
- Coordinates: 41°57′42″N 1°59′40″W
- Country: Spain
- Autonomous community: La Rioja
- Comarca: Cervera

Government
  - Mayor: Tovías Ramón Martínez López (PP)

Area
  - Total: 54.11 km^{2} (20.89 sq mi)
- Elevation: 642 m (2,106 ft)

Population (2025-01-01)
  - Total: 421
- Postal code: 26530
- Website: Aguilar del Río Alhama

Aguilar del Río Alhama is a village in the province and autonomous community of La Rioja, Spain. The municipality covers an area of 54.11 square kilometres (20.89 sq mi) and as of 2011 had a population of 549 people. It is located in a low altitude mountainous area, in the foothills of the Iberian System. It belongs to the region of Rioja Baja and is washed by the waters of the Alhama river.

== Location ==
Municipality of Aguilar del Río Alhama.

The municipality is located in the extreme southeast of La Rioja, in the foothills of the Sierra del Pelago. It is bordered to the north and east by Cervera del Rio Alhama, west (from N to S) by Valdemadera and Navajún, and to the south by four municipalities in Soria province (from W to E), Cigudosa, San Felices, Dévanos and Ágreda.

== History ==
The earliest record of the municipality dates from the 12th century when it was incorporated into Castile in 1198.

In 1269 Theobald II of Navarre included it in the jurisdiction of Viana and granted a weekly market on Tuesdays.

In 1271 Henry I of Navarre ordered the residents of the village of Rio to relocate to the village to form a single municipality. In 1273 Pedro Sanchez de Monteagut, lord of Cascante, who owned the village, donated it to King Henry.

In 1302 toll collectors from Tudela claimed rights over the village as a result of which they complained to Alfonso Robray, governor of Navarre, who ordered them not to worry.

In the 14th century, it was integrated into the lordship of Cameros. John II, in 1452, liberated the entire village from the perpetual tax on wine which they sold, for having been faithful, although they may have experienced theft, arrest or were killed.

In 1463 Henry IV of Castile subjected many villages to his dominion, including Aguilar, under the compromise ruling granted by Louis XI of France.

In the 16th century, the Aguilar County was created.

Until the late 16th century, Aguilar del Rio Alhama was an Islamic community of Moriscos (Moors forcibly converted to Catholicism). In the 1580s, it was the scene of one of the worst collective persecutions of an entire Morisco community in the history of the Inquisition, when nearly 30 adults from a village of some hundred households were burned at the stake or died in prison for secretly practising Islamic rituals. The Morisco community never recovered, and in the early years of the 17th century, all Moriscos were expelled from Spain by royal edict.

A mine was discovered in 1747 in a place called Santo de la Peña. Here a small extraction was conducted and this was sold to potters from Ágreda. There is no evidence that exploiting followed later.

=== Dinosaur footprints ===
During the Cretaceous period the zone where Aguilar del Río Alhama occupies formed part of a flooded plain that was eroded periodically, leaving behind muddy areas where dinosaur tracks remained marked into its path. Eventually these were dried and covered with new sediment whose weight compressed the lower layers, causing them to solidify into rocks over millions of years. Erosion has been wearing down the upper layers resulting in many of these rock formations becoming visible, revealing the footprints.

The town is the site of "La Virgen del Prado", declared Bien de Interés Cultural in the category of Historic Site on 23 June 2000. It is located near the village of Inestrillas next to the chapel that lends its name to the site, 2.4 km from the road. It is easily accessible. In it there are 36 footprints of carnivorous dinosaurs between 30 and 32 cm in the length which shows three stylized fingers (Filichnites gracilis). Four of the footprints form a small trail and the rest are isolated. Aguilar del Río Alhama has the peculiarity of containing the oldest footprints in La Rioja. Fish scales of the genus Lepidotes have also been found.

== Demography ==
The closure, in 1959, of a textile factory which employed a number of people, caused a rapid decline in the population, as many had to move to other areas in search of work.

On 1 January 2010 the population was 573 inhabitants, 275 men and 298 women.

demographic vertical bar chart of between 1857 and 2010
Legal population (1857-1897) according to the population census published by the Instituto Nacional de Estadística in the 19th century.
Legal population (1900-1991) or Resident population (2001) according to the population census published by the Instituto Nacional de Estadística.
Population according to the municipal register of 2010 published by the Instituto Nacional de Estadística.

=== Recent population of the main nucleus ===
As at 1 January 2010, Aguilar del Río Alhama had a population of 493 inhabitants with 241 men and 252 women.

demographic vertical bar chart of between 2000 and 2010

=== Population by nucleus ===
Nucleus	Inhabitants (2000)	Inhabitants (2010)
Aguilar del Río Alhama	650	493
Inestrillas	37	80

== Communication routes ==
- County road 284 connects Aguilar to Cervera del Río Alhama, the head of the region. Inestrillas, a village located in this same county, is found on this road.
- Route 388 connects to the Soria towns of San Felices and Castilruiz.
- Route 490 connects to Valdemadera and Navajún.

There is bus service from:

- Logroño
- Cervera del Río Alhama
- Calahorra. Weekdays only.
- Alfaro. Weekdays only.
- Tudela

== Places of interest ==
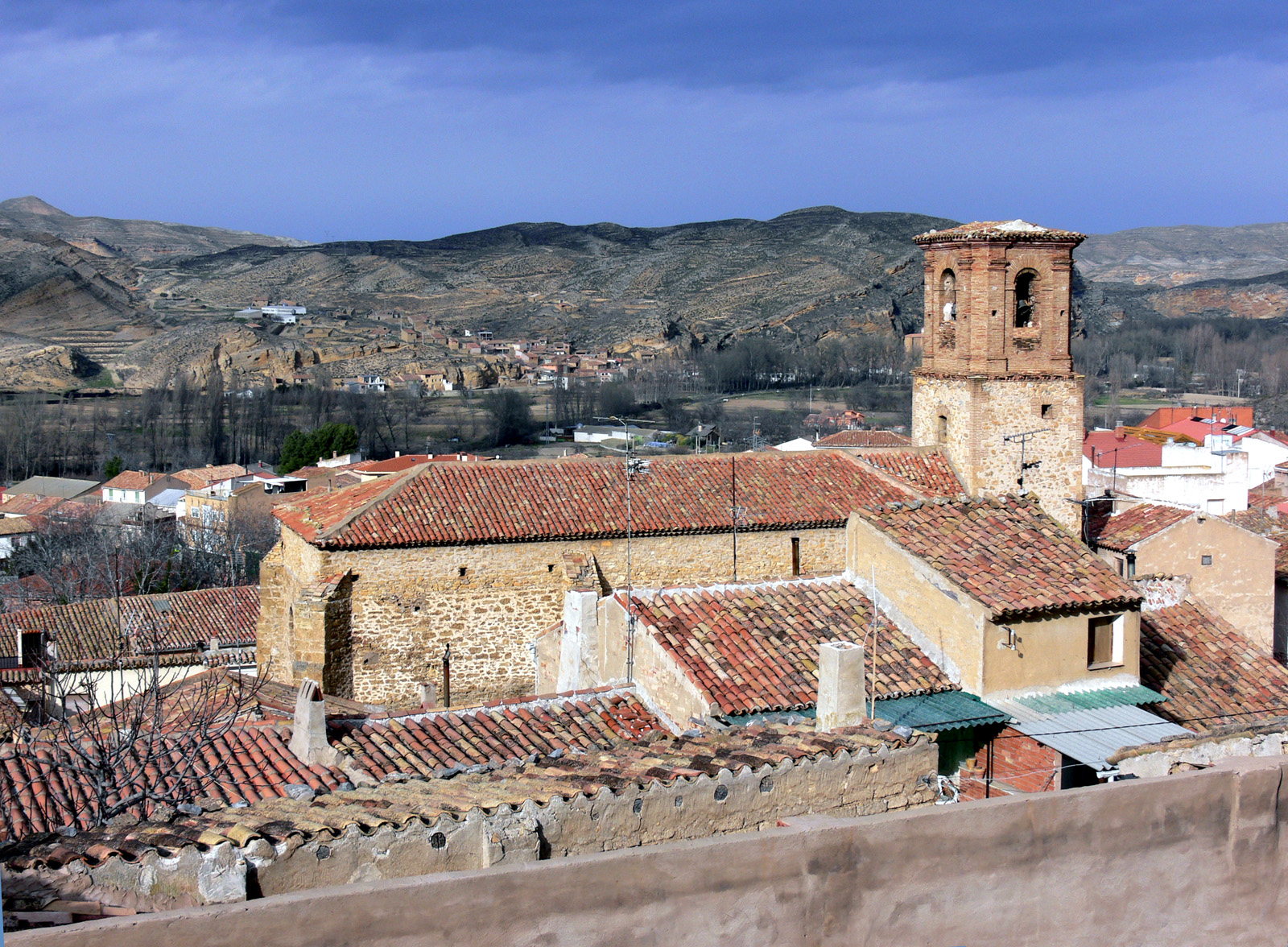
Church of the Assumption (16th century) and Sierra del Tormo.

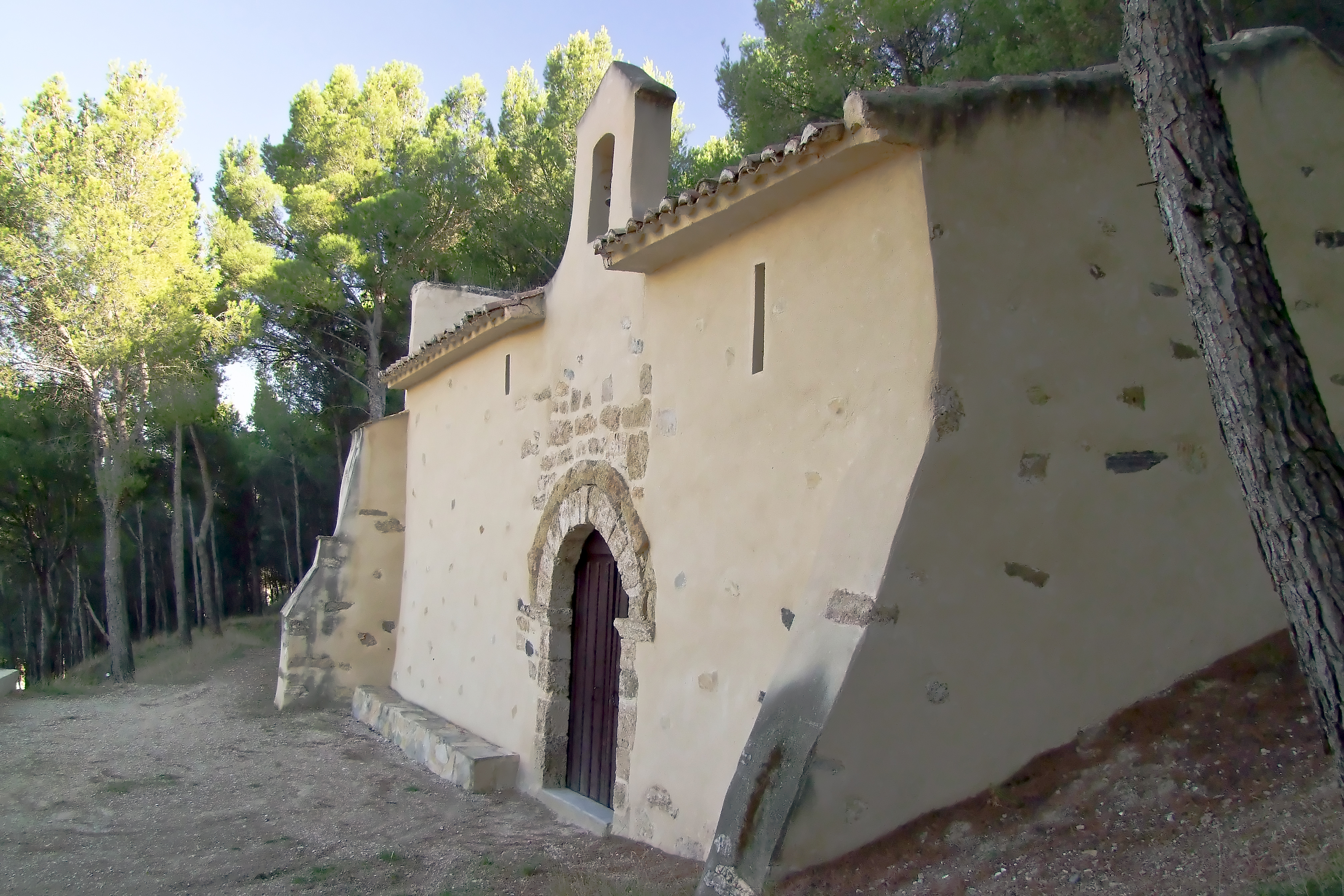
Santa María La Antigua Hermitage.

=== Buildings and monuments ===
- Church of the Assumption: Made up of a single nave with three sections and was built with stone and ashlar in the 16th century. It has starry ribbed vaults and four side chapels. It features neoclassical and baroque altarpieces. There is a Gothic sculpture of the Virgen de los Remedios and a recumbent Christ from the 18th century.
- The Valvanera or Santa María La Antigua Hermitage: From the Romanesque period.
- Castle: It was located on top of the hill next to the village and was built in the 12th century. Only its ruins remain.

=== Other places of interest ===
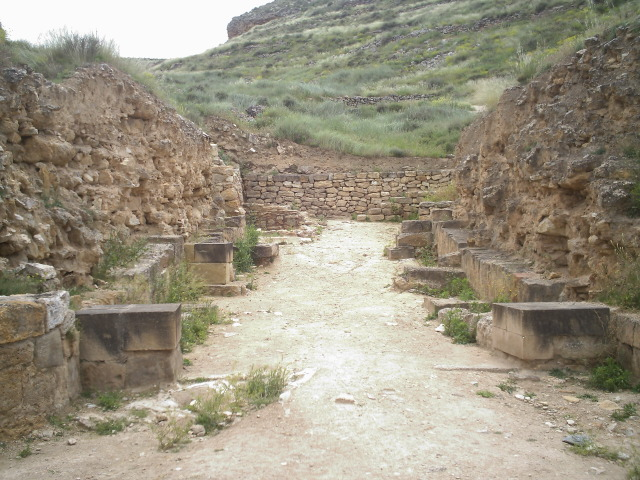
Contrebia Leucade, northern gate of the city.

- Contrebia Leukade: was a Celtiberian city whose history dates back to the early Iron Age. Its ruins are preserved in relatively good condition. It is adjacent to the village of Inestrillas.
- Gutur: is a deserted village which has a chapel dedicated to the Virgen de los Remedios.

== Flora and fauna ==
There are a lot of vultures flying over the town which take advantage of the thermal currents. There are also golden eagles, Bonelli and hawks. There is also the Mustela putorius or European polecat.

In the municipality, besides common trees such as the oak or elder, there is also found the pistacia terebinthus or turpentine tree, the acer monspessulanum or black maple, Juniperus phoenicea or Phoenicean Juniper, the Juniperus oxycedrus or prickly Juniper, cistus albidus or white rockrose.

== Celebrations ==
- January 17, San Antón.
- May 3, Day of the Cross. It was moved to the first Saturday in May and is a pilgrimage to the shrine of the Virgen de los Remedios in Gutur. Bodigos (bread stuffed with egg and sausage) are traditional features of this day.
- 14 to 20 August, festivities in honour of the Assumption and Saint Roch.

== Image gallery ==
Views of Aguilar

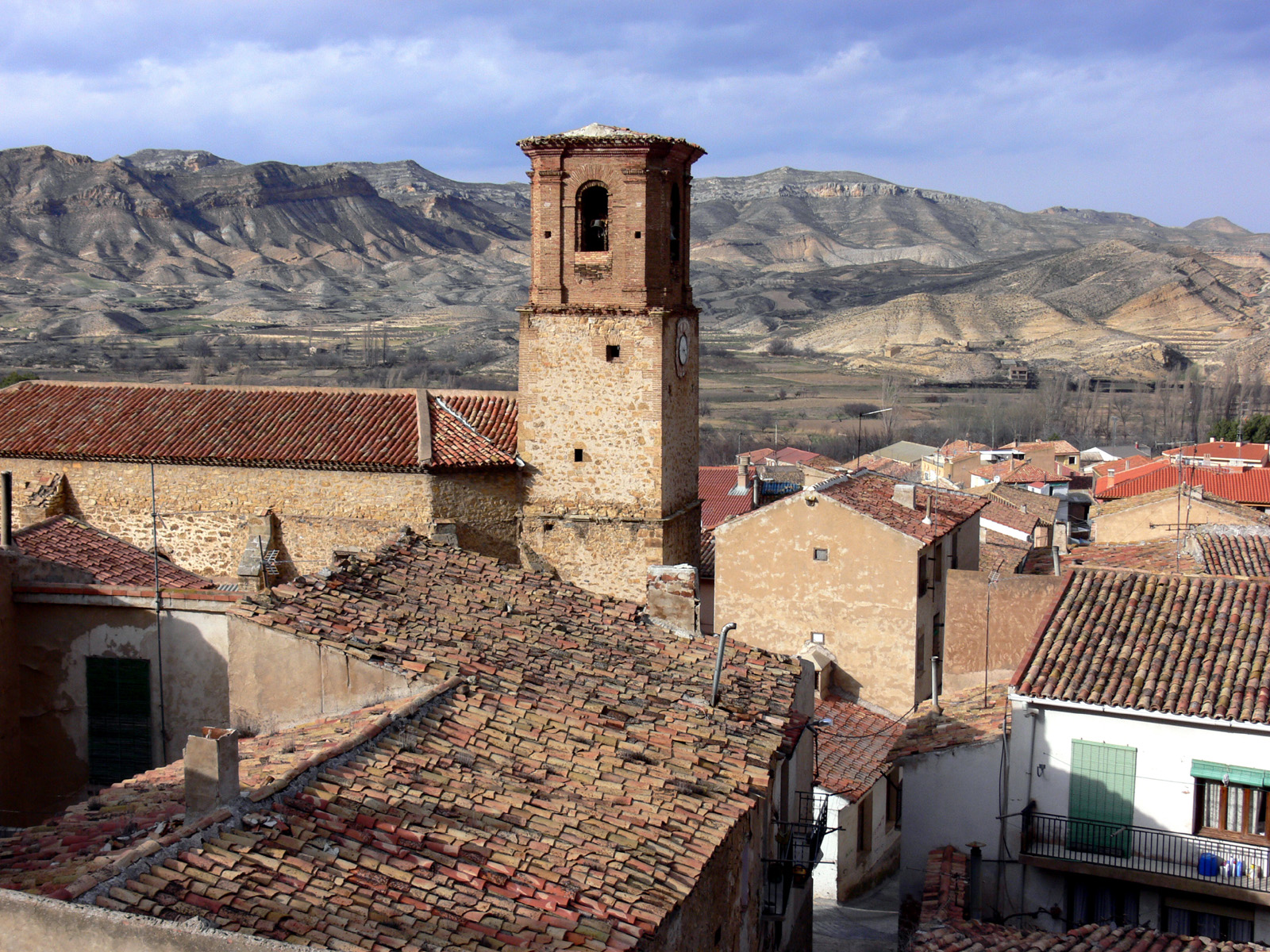
Tower of the 16th century Asunción church - Sierra del Tormo.

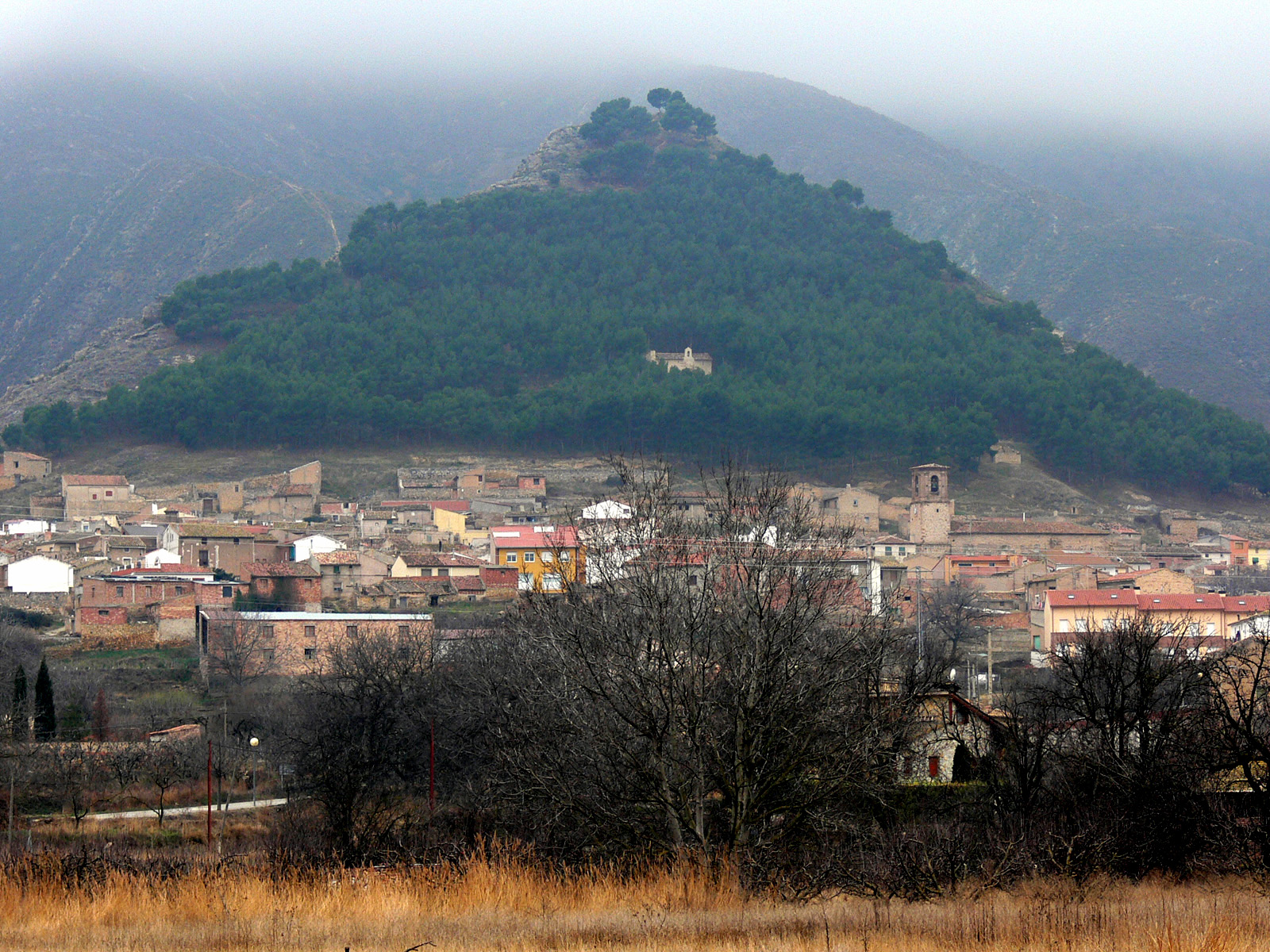
Valvanera or Santa María la Antigua Hermitage.

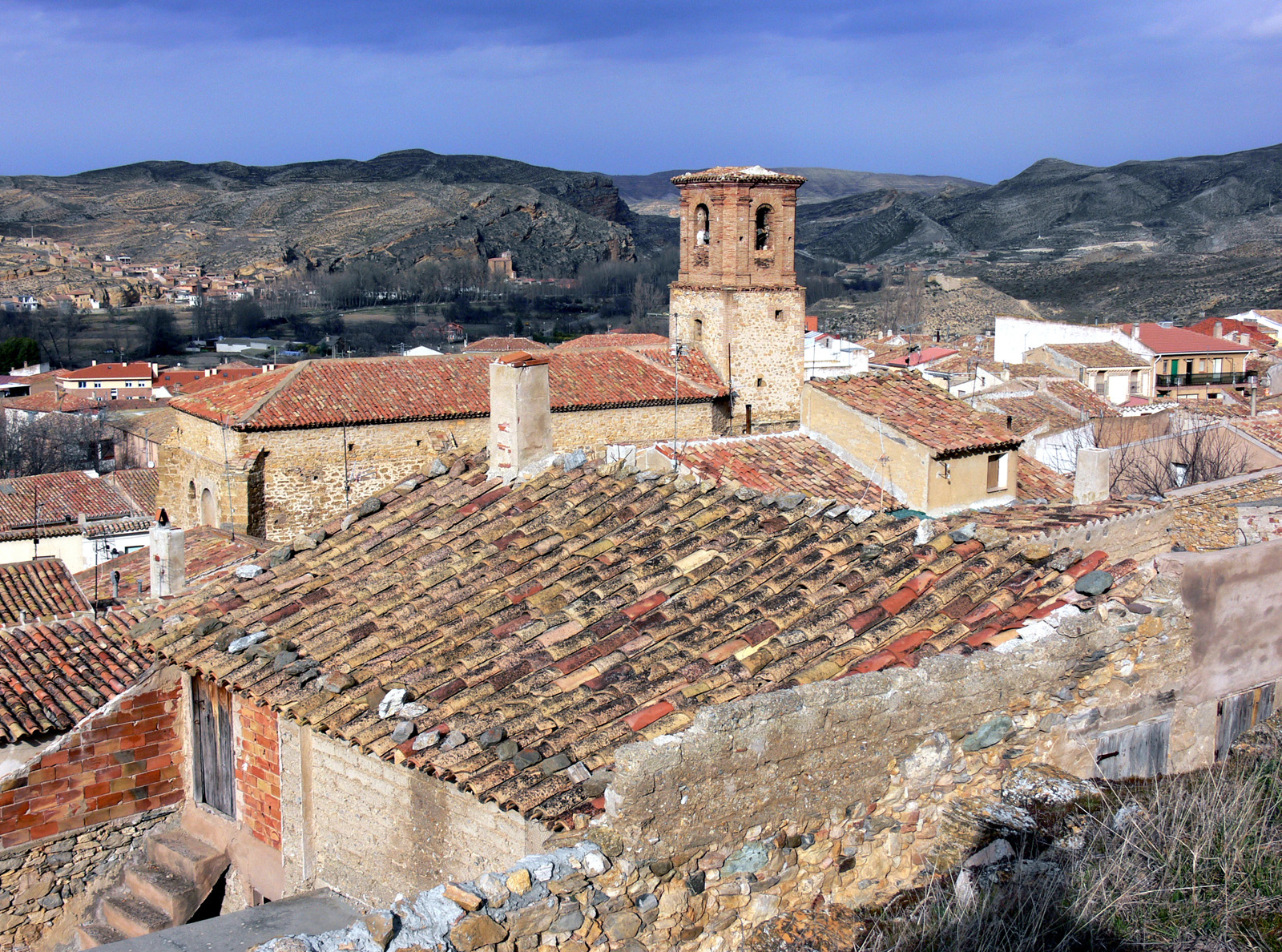
16th century Asunción Church.

== Bibliography ==
- Madoz, Pascual (2008). Diccionario Geográfico-Estadístico-Histórico de España y sus posesiones de ultramar - Rioja (Geographical-Statistical-Historical Dictionary of Spain and its overseas possessions - Rioja). Asociación de Librerías de La Rioja. LR-99-2008.

== See also ==
- List of municipalities in La Rioja
- La Rioja (Spain)
