= Juan Ramírez de Arellano el Noble =

Juan Ramírez de Arellano el Noble (died 1386) was a Navarrese nobleman and statesman. He served King Charles II of Navarre until 1362, when he left Navarre to serve King Peter IV of Aragon. In Aragon, he befriended the exiled Duke Henry of Trastámara and followed him in 1366 when he was proclaimed King Henry II of Castile. He remained in Castilian service until his death. He frequently acted as a diplomat and sometime mediator between the three kingdoms, since he retained connections to Navarre until 1378.

== Family ==
Juan was born in the first half of the 14th century. His father was the Navarrese nobleman Ramiro Sánchez, lord of Arellano, Allo and Ujué and alcalde of Estella. His mother was the Aragonese noblewoman Elvira Aznares. According to the 17th-century historian Luis de Salazar y Castro, Elvira was the lady of Berdún and Escó. Juan was the eldest son. He had a younger brother named Ramiro Sánchez de Arellano.

Juan's first wife was Toda López de Rada. They had no children. His second wife was Venancia (Venecia) de Branc. She became a member of the household of Eleanor of Sicily, wife of King Peter IV of Aragon, from 1363. Their eldest son, Juan Ramírez de Arellano el Mozo, died at the battle of Aljubarrota in August 1385, shortly before his father.

== Service of Charles II ==
Juan was one of the fourteen ricoshombres at the coronation of Charles II in 1350. On 24 September 1350, Charles instructed the treasury to compensate Juan for four trips he made with cavalry and infantry to Bernedo, Zúñiga (twice) and Eulate on the Castilian frontier to deal with the business of the Santa Hermandad.

In 1353, Juan was sent on a mission to the court of King Peter of Castile, although the purpose of the embassy is unknown. In response to the capture of Charles II by France, he and several other Navarrese noblemen attacked L'Aigle and killed the French constable, Carlos de la Cerda, on 8 January 1354.

By 1357, Juan was paid 120 pounds a year for the six caballerías (knight's fees) he was assigned and 40 pounds for a mesnadería in Estella. That year he participated in Charles II's campaign in the Duchy of Normandy in pursuit of the French crown. He was rewarded with revenues from Dicastillo and Allo and an annuity of 60 carlines.

In 1360, Juan was named marshal of Navarre. In 1362, he renounced his allegiance to Navarre and entered the service of King Peter IV of Aragon with his household and his retainers. In his letter of renunciation dated 12 December, he justifies his action on the grounds that Charles II had unjustly accused him, but of what he does not say. Given his subsequent service with Aragon, it may have been related to Charles's decision to invade Aragon in league with Castile, although Juan himself took part in negotiating the alliance.

== Service of Peter IV ==
In Aragon, Juan was named grand chamberlain. He acted as a diplomat and befriended the exiled Duke Henry of Trastámara. Nevertheless, he maintained contact with Charles II and continued to permit his retainers to fight for Navarre. He even acted as Charles's envoy on unspecified missions in 1363 and to the Count of Foix in 1364. According to Pedro López de Ayala, Peter IV gave him the castle of Sos in 1363 so that he could host the two kings and the duke of Trastámara for alliance negotiations, implying that Juan was trusted by all three. The final negotiations took place at Sos in early 1364.

In 1365, Peter IV sent Juan as an envoy to Navarre. On 21 January 1366, Charles II granted him Arellano and Subiza.

== Service of Henry II and John I ==
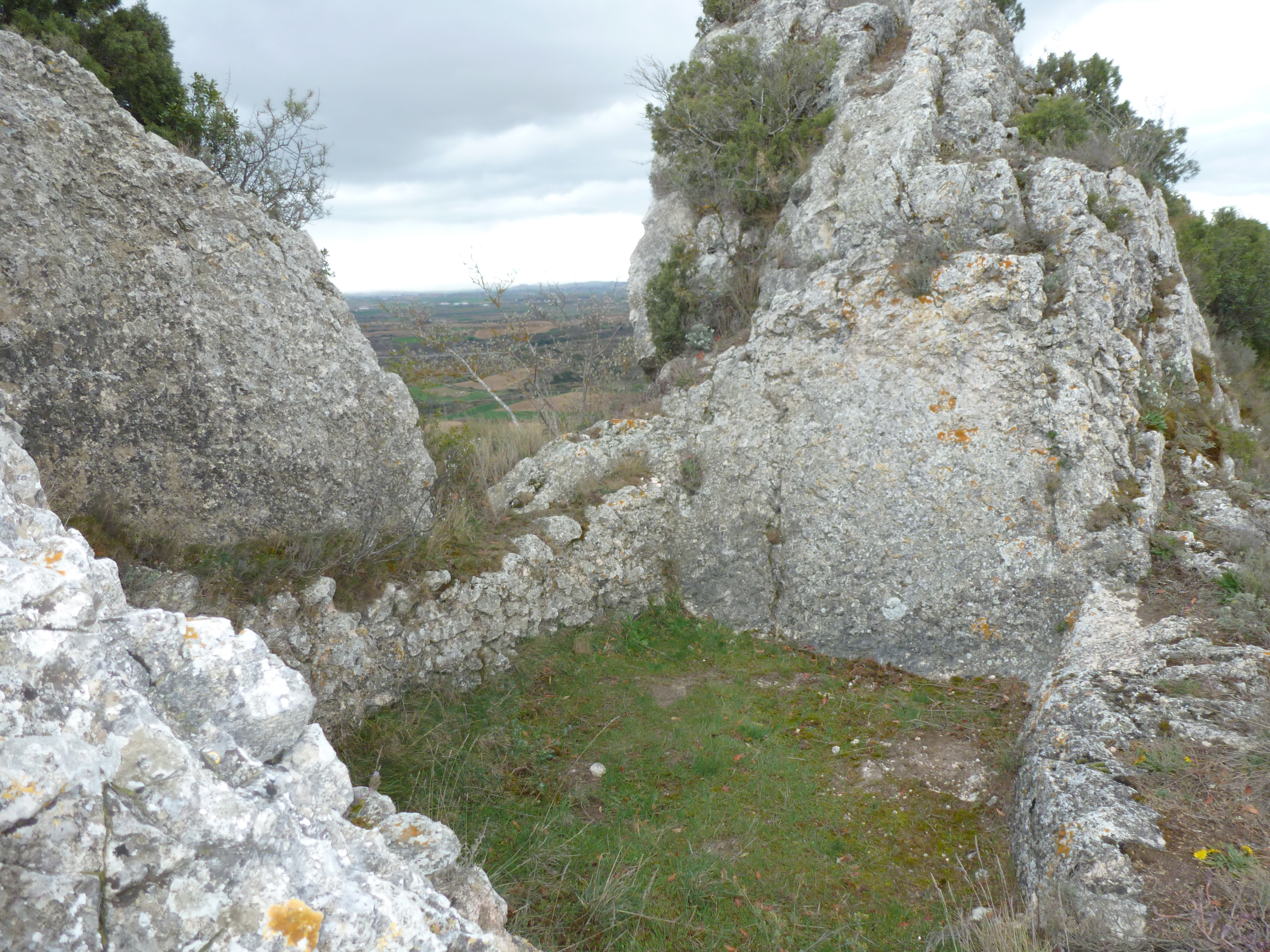
Ruins of the castle of Buradón today

In 1366, Charles II used Juan as his representative in negotiations with the duke of Trastámara, who had been proclaimed king of Castile. Juan transferred his allegiance from Peter IV to Henry. He was present when Henry was proclaimed king at Calahorra and when he was crowned at Burgos. On 8 April, Henry transferred to him the lordship of Cameros. When the final treaty between the Charles and Henry was agreed at Santa Cruz de Campezo in early 1367, Juan acted as Henry's agent in taking control of the Navarrese castle of Buradón as surety. Charles reneged on the treaty, allowing the Black Prince and the deposed King Peter of Castile to cross his territory with an army. In the ensuing battle of Nájera, Juan fought on the side of Henry and was captured.

In 1369, Henry granted Juan the villages of Navarrete, Muro de Aguas, Albelda and Viguera. Juan also exercised an encomienda over the abbey of Santa María de Herce as the successor of Juan Alfonso de Haro III, the previous lord of Cameros. He sought to rationalize the territory of Cameros by exchanges of territory. In May 1369, he acquired the bailliage of Alcanadre and the village of Carbonera from the abbey of Santa María la Real de Las Huelgas in exchange for a place called Armesyldo.

In 1370, Juan was the king of Castile's procurator in the peace treaty with Aragon. In 1375, he was the king's envoy to Pope Gregory XI. In 1378, when Castile invaded Navarre, Juan and his son sided with Castile. All their property in Navarre was confiscated. Later Navarrese historiography, such as Carlos de Viana and José de Moret, regards this as a great act of treason. Juan's brother, Ramiro Sánchez, who was also living in Castile at the time, remained loyal to Charles II and travelled to Navarre to support him.

Juan continued to serve Castile after Henry II was succeeded by John I. The latter rewarded him with the villages of Cigudosa (1377); Pinillos, Jalón, Alcocer and Arrúbal (1378); and Aguilar del Río Alhama, Valdemadera, Navajún and Andaluz with their hamlets (1381). On 22 December 1380, however, while attending the Assembly of Medina del Campo, John I deprived Juan of the encomienda over Santa María de Herce. In 1381, he also revoked the grant of Navarrete.

Juan drew up his final will on 29 October 1385 in Soria. He named his brother Ramiro as guardian of his heirs, Carlos, Juan and Leonor, the children of his late son. He died in 1386.

== Sources ==
- Diago Hernando, Máximo (2003). "Un noble entre tres reinos en la España del siglo XIV: Juan Ramírez de Arellano". Príncipe de Viana. 64 (230): 523–556.
- Kagay, Donald J.; Villalon, L. J. Andrew (2021). Conflict in Fourteenth-Century Iberia: Aragon vs. Castile and the War of the Two Pedros. Brill.
- Pérez Carazo, Pedro (2022). "Ramírez de Arellano, Juan". Diccionario Biográfico Español. Real Academia de la Historia.
- Villalon, L. J. Andrew; Kagay, Donald J. (2017). To Win and Lose a Medieval Battle: Nájera (April 3, 1367), a Pyrrhic Victory for the Black Prince. Brill.
