= Valdegutur =

- Populated place
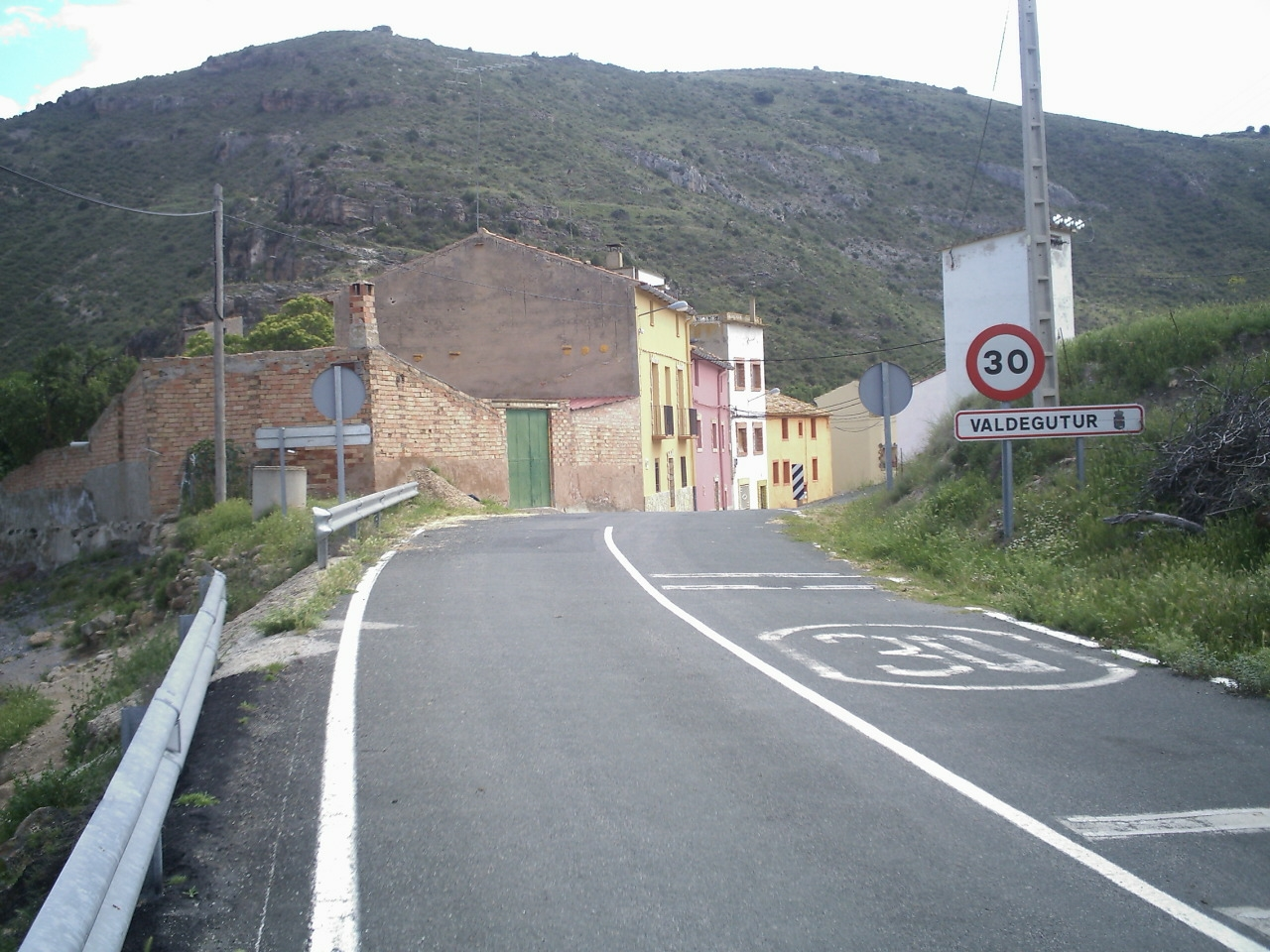
- Access to the village

- Location within La Rioja, Spain Location within Spain
- Country: Spain
- Autonomous community: La Rioja
- Comarca: Cervera

Population
  - Total: 10
- Postal code: 26520

Valdegutur is a village in the municipality of Cervera del Río Alhama, in the province and autonomous community of La Rioja, Spain. In 2018, it had a population of 10.
