= Cabretón =

- Populated place
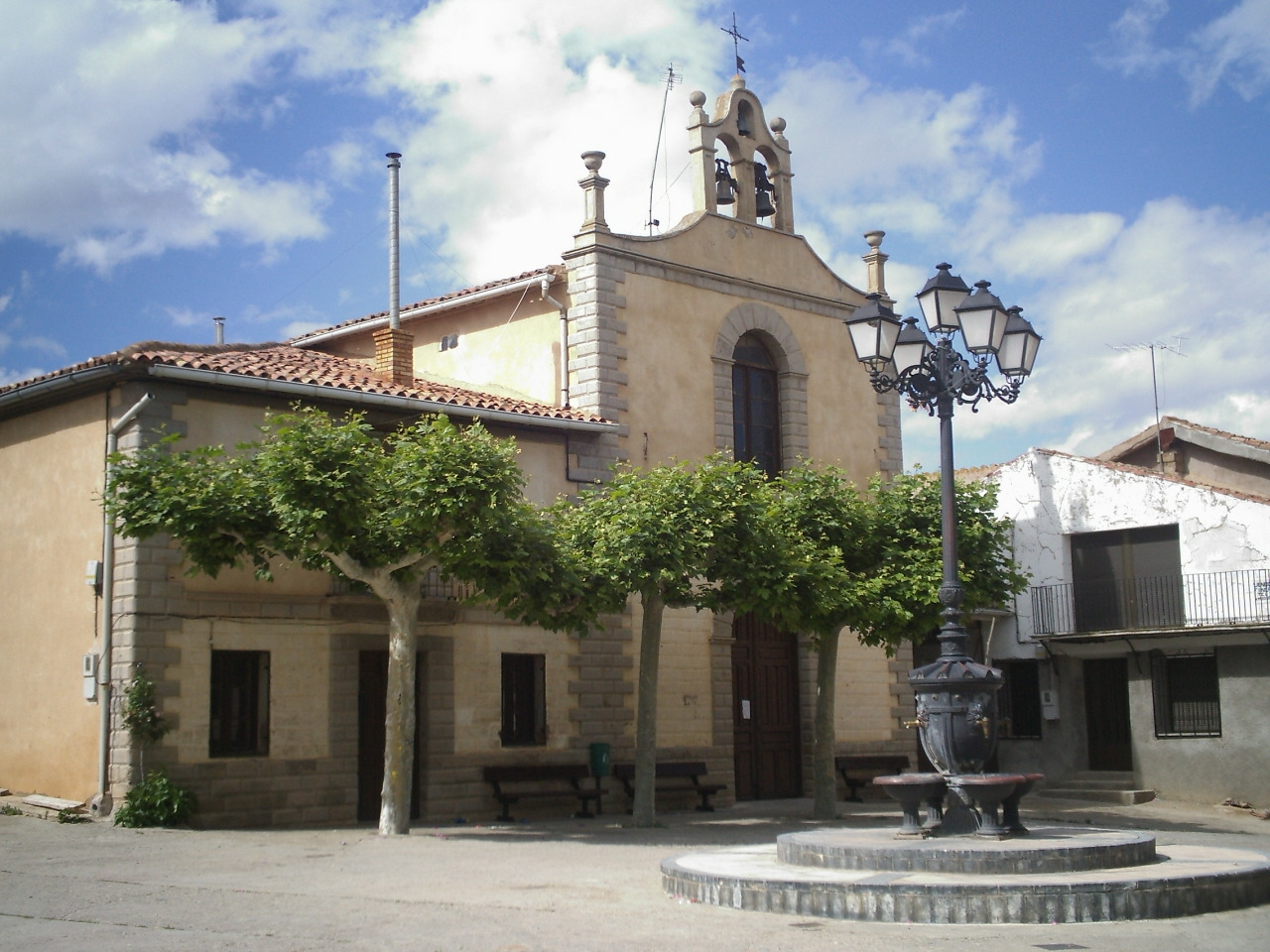
- Main square.

- Location within La Rioja, Spain Location within Spain
- Country: Spain
- Autonomous community: La Rioja
- Comarca: Cervera

Population
  - Total: 178
- Postal code: 26520

Cabretón is a village in the municipality of Cervera del Río Alhama, in the province and autonomous community of La Rioja, Spain. As of 2018 had a population of 178 people.
