= Valverde, La Rioja =

Valverde
- Populated place
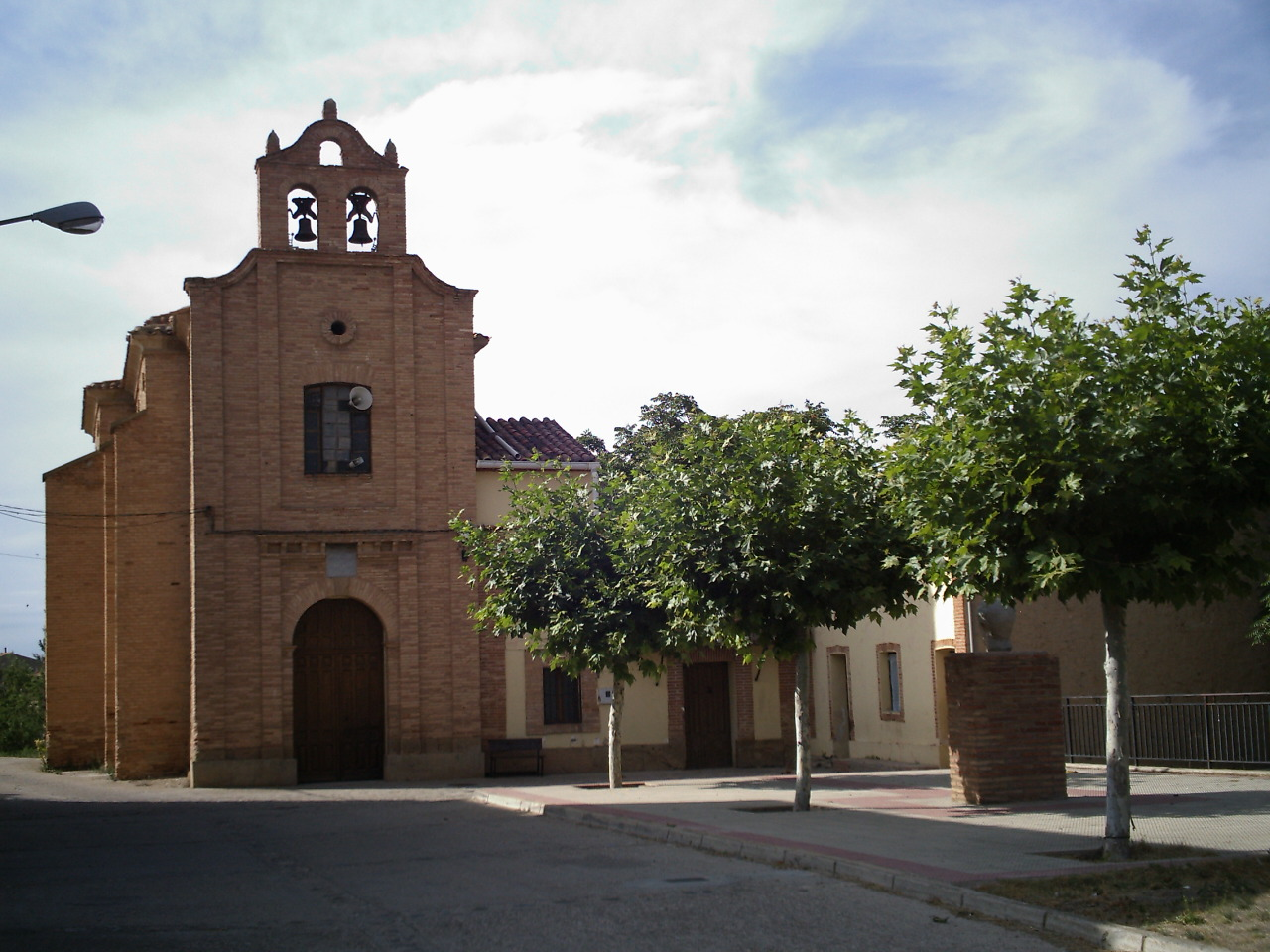
- Church of Nuestra Señora del Rosario

- Location within La Rioja, Spain Location within Spain
- Country: Spain
- Autonomous community: La Rioja
- Comarca: Cervera

Population
  - Total: 209
- Postal code: 26520

Valverde is a village in the municipality of Cervera del Río Alhama, in the province and autonomous community of La Rioja, Spain. As of 2018 had a population of 209 people.

== Notable people ==
- Brianda de Acuña (1576-1630), nun and writer
