= Viniegra de Abajo =

- Municipality
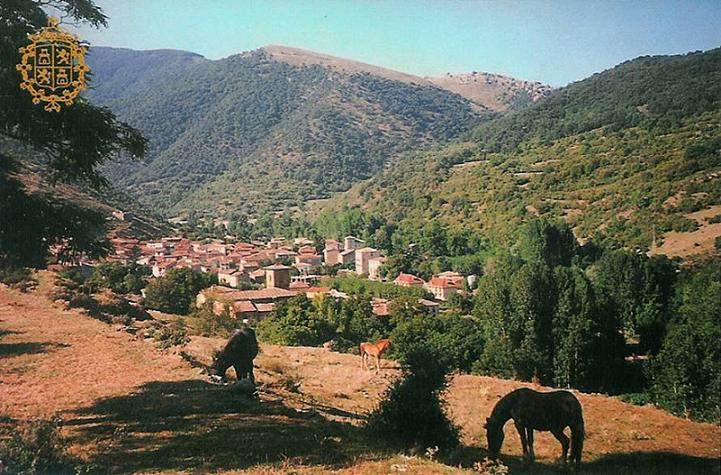

- Location in La Rioja

- Location in La Rioja Location in Spain
- Coordinates: 42°9′5″N 2°53′20″W
- Country: Spain
- Province: La Rioja
- Comarca: Anguiano

Government
  - Mayor: Pedro Ochoa Espiga (PSOE)

Area
  - Total: 30.9 km^{2} (11.9 sq mi)

Population (2025-01-01)
  - Total: 81
- Time zone: UTC+1
  - Summer (DST): UTC+2 (CEST)
- Postal code: 26325
- Area code: 34 (Spain) + 941 (La Rioja)
- Website: www.lasviniegras.es

Viniegra de Abajo is a municipality of La Rioja (Spain).

Viniegra de Abajo is between the Camero Nuevo and the Sierra de la Demanda, in what is called the subregion of High Najerilla.

Through Viniegra passes the Urbión river, which born in the Picos de Urbión, which are within the municipal term of the population.

== History ==
The finding of tombs and a Visigothic wake in the urban enclosure attests the antiquity of the foundation of the town. In 1366 it was included with the denomination of Viniegra de Yuso, between the localities of the Lordship of Cameros, that would be yielded by Enrique II of Trastámara to Juan Ramirez de Arellano by its support in the fight against Pedro the Cruel.

Since then it belonged to the lordship of the counts of Aguilar and Inestrillas, heirs of the dominion of Cameros, according to what appears stated in the Cadastre of the Marquis of Ensenada of year 1751. After the abolition of lordships in Spain in 1811, it became a town free of the province of Soria, until the creation of the province of Logroño on the 30 of November 1833.

== Economy ==
- Its economy is based essentially on raising sheep and goats and cattle and horses. Its long transhumance tradition recalls times of splendor in the 16th and following centuries.
- Also it owns tree-felling areas in choperas, pine groves, encinares and degraded rest of the native robledal.
- The trouts of their boundaries give deserved fame carcavas by which their rivers, the Najerilla, the Urbión flow and affluents.
- The hunting of the wild boar and corzo along with the dove passages give another additional incentive him to Viniegra for the fans to the cinegetic sport.
- Agriculture is based exclusively on the kitchen gardens for own consumption that are cultivated in the neighborhood of the town.

== Politics ==
List of mayors since the democratic elections of 1979
| Term | Mayor | Political party |
|---|---|---|
| 1979–1983 | Florián Salas Garachana | UCD |
| 1983–1987 | Pedro Ochoa Espiga | AP |
| 1987–1991 | Félix Santiago Miera Sainz | Independent |
| 1991–1995 | Féliz Santiago Miera Sainz | PSOE |
| 1995–1999 | Felix Santiago Miera Sainz | PSOE |
| 1999–2003 | Juan Carlos Jiménez de Miguel | PP |
| 2003–2007 | Jesús Mª García Palacios | PSOE |
| 2007–2011 | Pedro Ochoa Espiga | PSOE |
| 2011–2015 | Pedro Ochoa Espiga | PP |
| 2015–2019 | Juan Ignacio Martínez Fernández | PP |
| 2019–2023 | n/d | n/d |
| 2023– | n/d | n/d |

== Festivals ==
In Viniegra there are two main celebrations, those of Winter, that are those of San Ildefonso, and those of summer, Santiago. But besides these, also there are others:

- San Ildefonso. They are the celebrations of Winter, the 23 of January. It is custom to distribute to which hogaza of called bread wants one “bodigo”. Usually there is verbena in a carp that puts in the place of the town.
- Celebration of the canoes. The first Sunday of May is celebrated. It is a concentration of piragüistas to realise the reduction of the Najerilla from the Sale of the Goyo.
- Santiago. The 25 of July are celebrated and are the great celebrations. The eve of the 25 santo of the hermitage from Santiago lowers to the church, where he remains until the last weekend of August, that becomes to raise in procession to the hermitage where it will remain the rest of the year. There is verbena in the place for all.
- Romería of San Millán. In the middle of August one is realised romería to the hermitage of San Millán, located in the Mountain range. After the misa, and to eat and to drink well the people cloak is realised. When returning to the town, a shutdown in the Plantation is made to have tea.
- Ascent of San. Usually it is celebrated the last weekend of August and one rises Santo to the hermitage. At night, all the town has dinner in the place accompanied by “the Orquestina”.
- Fair of the cattle. He is the 9 of September and it is celebration for the cattle dealers, although they do not sell any head of cattle in this day but it is continued celebrating.
- Night of the Souls. It is day 1 of November. During the night of “the Saints” “rosaries” are sung by the streets of the town. Formerly it was used to make two groups, one of men and others of women, although already one by the shortage is only made of people.
- Chozo. The day of Nochevieja a pyre is made enough of firewood of height and fire catch ons.

== Notable people ==
- Domingo Izquierdo (1745-), named general lieutenant in 1794 by its heroic defense of the place of Roses during the site of the French. Person in charge in 1795 of the defense of Pamplona, and, later, commander in chief of Valencia and horseman of the Order of San Juan.
- Martín Matute Pérez (1781-1868) who, after study in Gerona, encouraged to the surrounded population publishing " Newspaper of Gerona", disclosing later, after being named academic of History in 1820, the past of its city of adoption in several volumes of " Spain Sagrada".

=== Architecture ===
- Church of Our Lady of the Assumption, 16th century
- Hermitage of the Solitude
- Hermitage of Santiago (in the summit of a near mount)
- Wake of Santa Marina
- Monument to the Sacred Heart of Jesus (in the summit of a near mount)

=== Leisure ===
- Pool of the Frogs (land to camp on next to the river)
- The Fertile Valley (place in the Urbión river with refuge)
