= Las Ventas, La Rioja =

Las Ventas
- Populated place
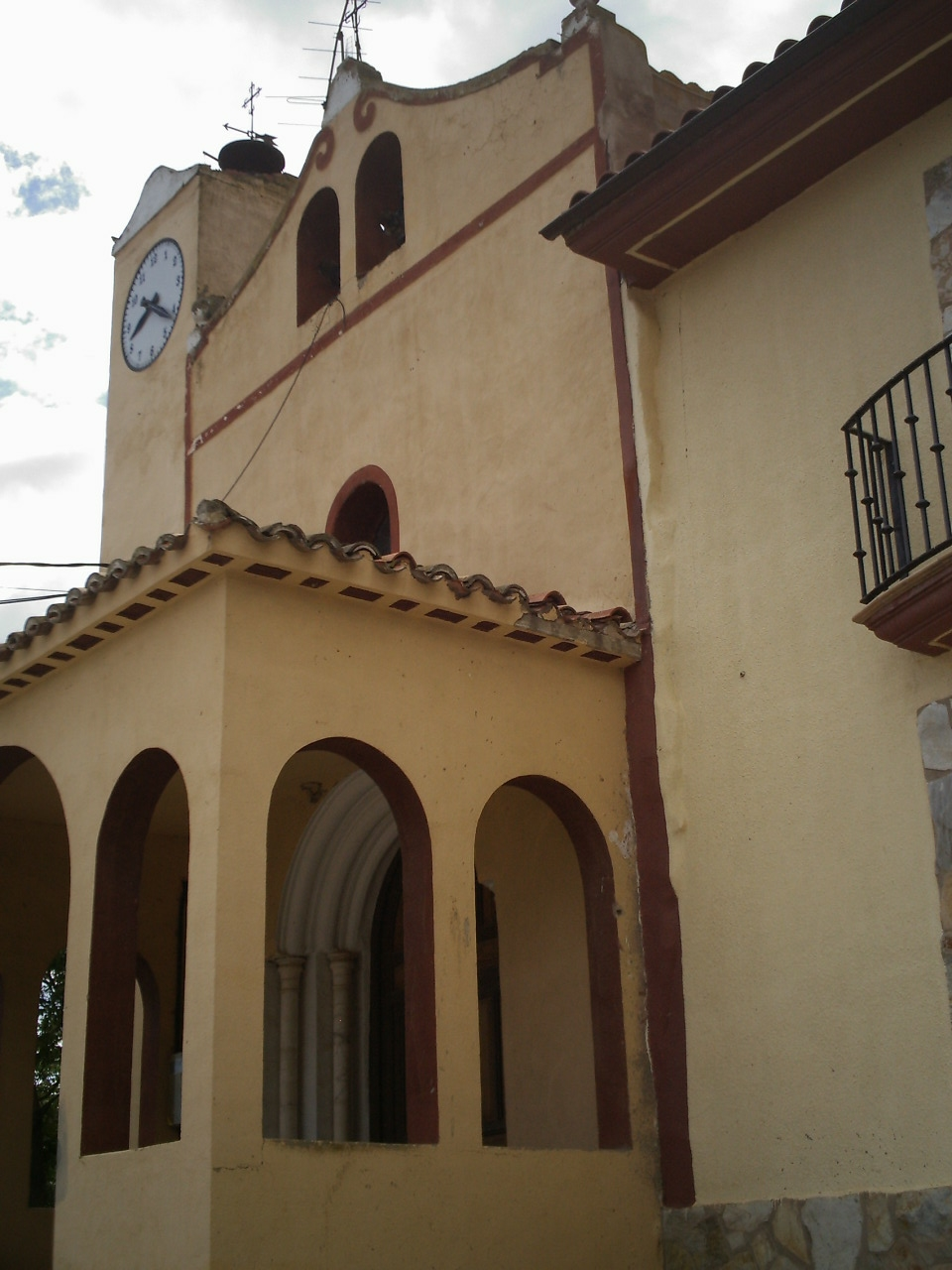
- Church of San Pedro

- Location within La Rioja, Spain Location within Spain
- Country: Spain
- Autonomous community: La Rioja
- Comarca: Cervera

Population
  - Total: 31
- Postal code: 26520

Las Ventas de Cervera also known as Ventas del Baño is a village in the municipality of Cervera del Río Alhama, in the province and autonomous community of La Rioja, Spain. As of 2018 had a population of 31 people.
