= Viniegra =

Viniegra is a Spanish surname. Notable people with the surname include:

- Manuel Viniegra (born 1988), Mexican footballer
- Salvador Viniegra (1862–1915), Spanish painter and philanthropist

== See also ==
- Viniegra de Abajo, municipality in La Rioja, Spain
- Viniegra de Arriba, village in La Rioja, Spain
