= Louis Lallemant =

17th-century French Jesuit

Louis Lallemant (1578 in Châlons-en-Champagne – 5 April 1635 in Bourges) was a French Jesuit.

After studying under the Fathers of the Society of Jesus, Lallemant entered that order in 1605 in Nancy. Having completed the usual course of study at the University of Pont-à-Mousson, he taught at the Jesuit colleges in La Flèche, Bourges and Rouen. He was ordained and taught philosophy for some time, until in 1622 he was made master of novices, an office he held for four years. He then became professor of theology at Clermont College in Paris. In 1628 he was appointed director of tertians, and as such, was responsible for the final year of formation for close to sixty Jesuits between 1628 and 1631. After three years at that post he broke down in health, and was sent to the college of Bourges, in the hope that a change of occupation would restore him; however, he died after a few months.

Lallemant has been called the Balthazar Alvarez of France; his ideals and efforts to meet them were as uncompromising as the latter's. Like Alvarez, Lallemant expected of others what he did himself. He set a high ideal before his disciples, especially the Fathers of the third probation (Third Year), and required them to rise to such ideals. Lallemant was critical of Jesuits who busied themselves with work and study but did not pray. In reaction to what he perceived as overly secular aspirations on the part of some of his colleagues, Lallemant tended to emphasize the contemplative life over the active apostolate.

He is known chiefly by his "Doctrine Spirituelle". This is a collection of his maxims and instructions which thoroughly details his spiritual method. It was compiled by Jean Rigoleuc, one of his disciples.

He is not to be confused with Charles Lallemant, author of La vie cachée de Notre Seigneur Jésus-Christ.

== Sources ==
- Pierre Champion – La Doctrine Spirituelle du P. Louis Lallemant (Paris, 1694), preceded by a life of Lallemant?
- Lallemant, Louis. The Spiritual Doctrine of Father Louis Lallemant of the Company of Jesus: Preceded by Some Account of His Life. Edited by Frederick William Faber. Portman Square, London, Britain: Burns & Lambert, 17th Portman Street, 1855.
- Ferdinand de Guilhermy, Menologie de l'Assistance de France, 5 April (unknown year)
- Giuseppe Antonio Patrignani, Menologio della Compagnia di Gesu.
- Henry Woods, transcribed by Joseph E. O'Connor
- Thomas Worcester, ed. The Cambridge Encyclopedia of the Jesuits. Cambridge: Cambridge University Press, 2017. doi:10.1017/9781139032780.
