= Cervera del Río Alhama =

- Municipality
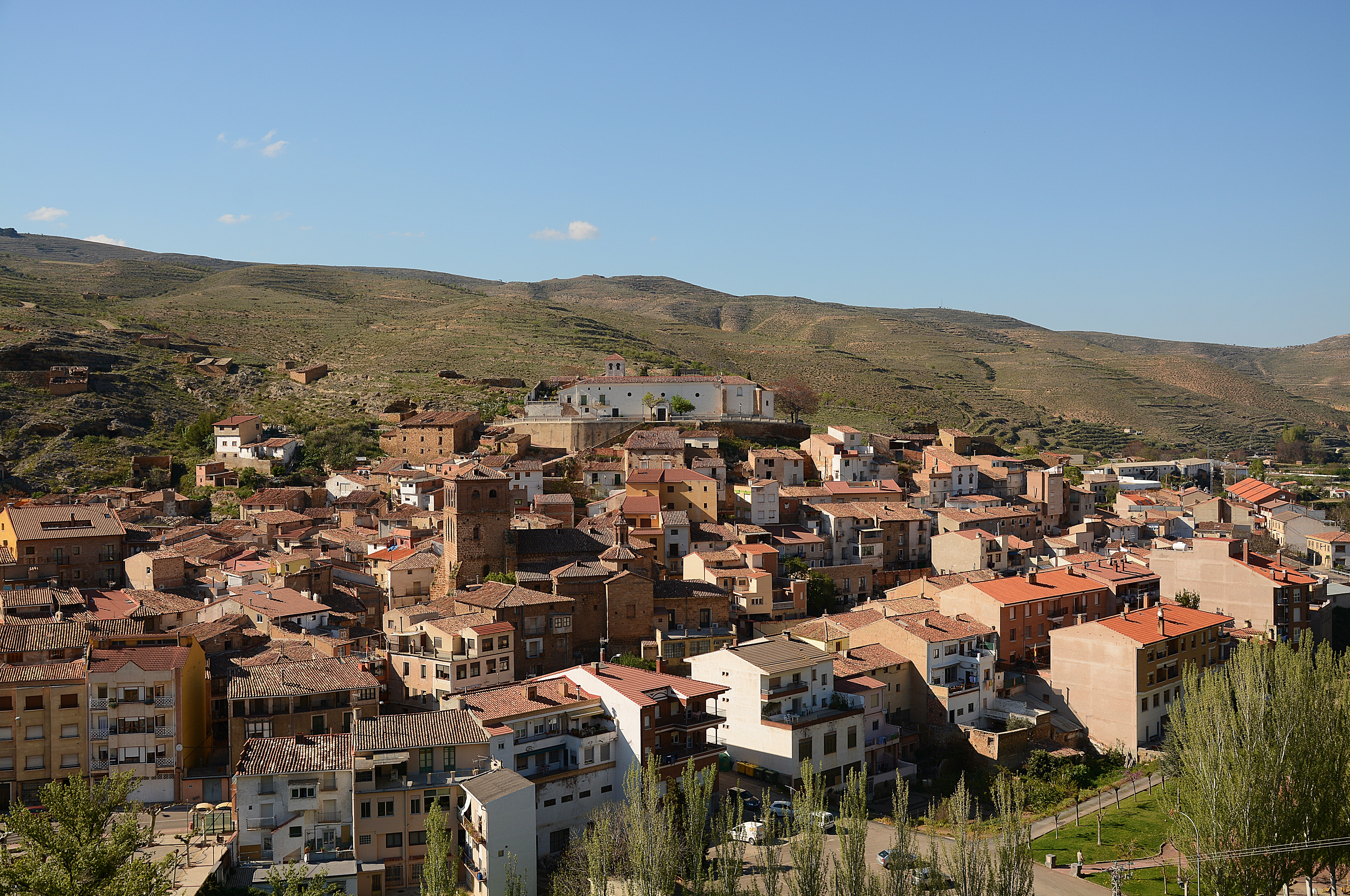
- Skyline of Cervera del Río Alhama

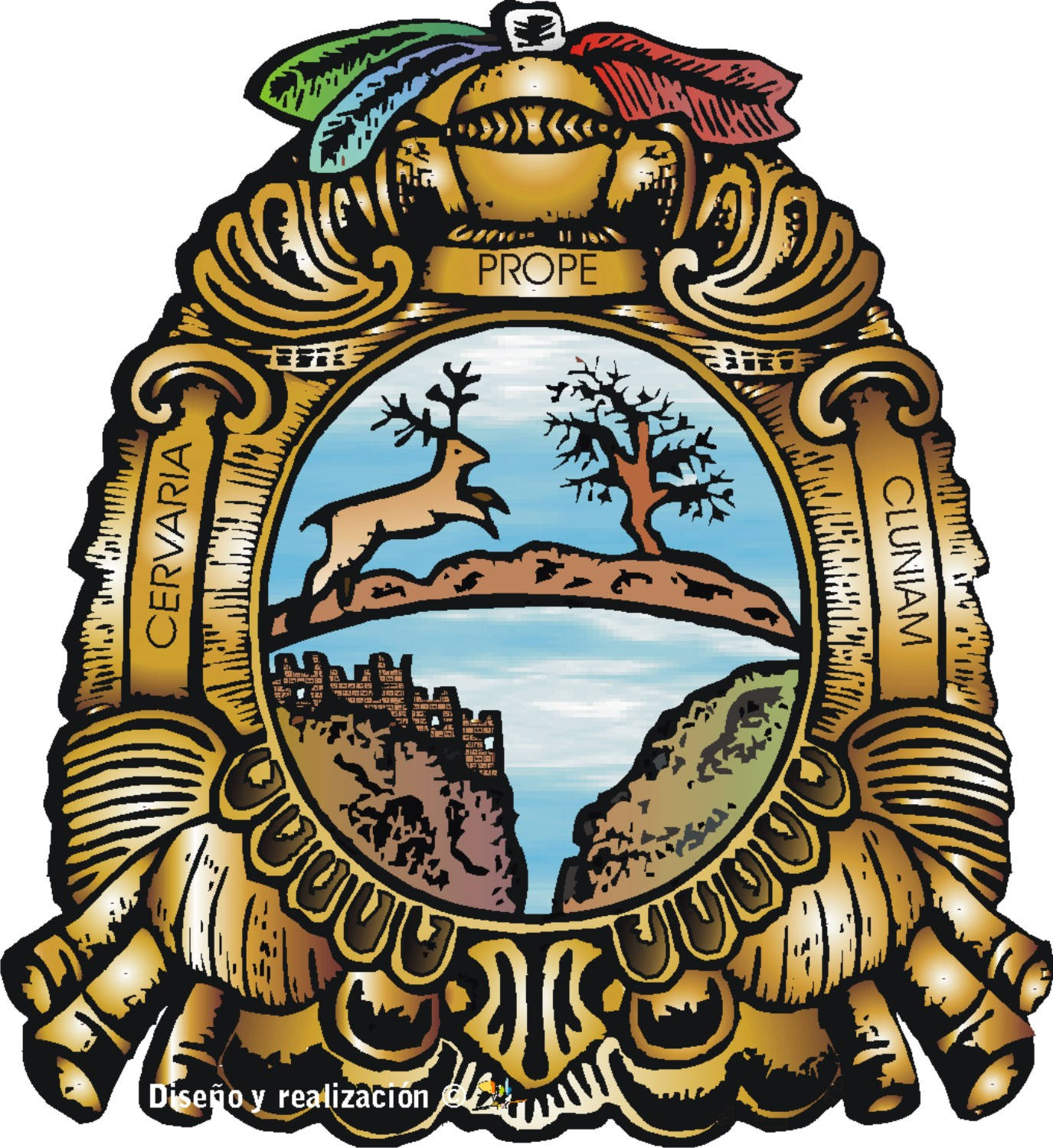
- Flag Coat of arms

- Location within La Rioja, Spain Location within Spain
- Coordinates: 42°00′25″N 1°57′07″W
- Country: Spain
- Autonomous community: La Rioja
- Comarca: Cervera

Government
  - Mayor: Álvaro Forcada (PP)

Area
  - Total: 152.58 km^{2} (58.91 sq mi)
- Elevation: 549 m (1,801 ft)

Population (2025-01-01)
  - Total: 2,237
- Demonym(s): cerverano, na
- Postal code: 26520
- Website: www.cerveradelrioalhama.org

Cervera del Río Alhama is a town in the province and autonomous community of La Rioja, Spain. The municipality covers an area of 152.56 square kilometres (58.90 sq mi) and as of 2011 had a population of 2704 people.

== Demographics ==
=== Population centres ===
- Cervera del Río Alhama
- Cabretón
- Las Ventas
- Rincón de Olivedo
- Valdegutur
- Valverde

== Politics ==
List of mayors since the democratic elections of 1979
Term	Mayor	Political party
1979–1983	Julio Santamaría Galarreta	UCD
1983–1987	José Luis Calahorra	PSOE
1987–1991	José María Tejada Hernández	PSOE
1991–1995	Fernando Moreno	PSOE
1995–1999	José Luis Sanz Alonso	PP
1999–2003	José Luis Sanz Alonso	PP
2003–2007	José Luis Sanz Alonso	PP
2007–2011	José Luis Sanz Alonso	PP
2011–2015	José Luis Sanz Alonso	PP
2015–2019	Estrella Santana Martínez	PSOE-Cervera Plural
2019–2023	n/d	n/d
2023–	n/d	n/d

== Notable people ==
- Balthazar Alvarez.
- Manuel Ibo Alfaro.
- Ignacio Alonso Zapatero.
- Daniel González.
- Manuel Alfaro González
- Eloy Alfaro Delgado
- Manuel Gil, actor.
- Angelita Alfaro.
- Don Juan Manuel Zapatero Castillo.
