= Battle of Pinos =

1596 naval battle near Cuba

- Part of the Anglo-Spanish War (1585)
- Location of Isla de Pinos (called Isla de la Juventud since 1978) in Cuba.
| Date | 11 March 1596 |
| Location | Off the Island of Pinos (present-day Cuba) |
| Result | Spanish victory |

Belligerents
| England | Spain |

Commanders and leaders
| Thomas Baskerville | Bernardino de Avellaneda |

Strength
| 14 warships | 13 galleons |

Casualties and losses
| 1 galleon captured 1 patache captured 325 killed or captured | 1 ship sunk 80 killed or wounded |

The Battle of Pinos was a naval engagement between a Spanish fleet under Admiral Bernardino Delgadillo y Avellaneda and the surviving ships of Francis Drake's expedition to the Spanish West Indies, now in command of Drake's lieutenant, Sir Thomas Baskerville, which took place off the Island of Pinos during the Anglo-Spanish war of 1585. The Spanish squadron was victorious, capturing two English ships.

== Background ==
After failed attacks against San Juan de Puerto Rico and Panama, during which Francis Drake and John Hawkins had perished from dysentery, the English fleet anchored in Portobello to reorganize and careen their ships prior to return to England. Sir Thomas Baskerville, Colonel-General of the landing forces, was then elected by his officers as the new commander of the retreating fleet, whose number of ships soon decreased to 18, as two of them, the Delight and the Elizabeth, had to be burned or sunk due to lack of crew. Two generals, 15 captains, and 22 officers had died in combat or from disease; a loss which demoralized the men on board.

The English fleet departed Portobello on February 8. A few days later a storm scattered the fleet. Several ships returned to England via Jamaica, while Baskerville, with the bulk of the fleet, headed to Cabo Corrientes to sail to his country along the northern coast of Cuba. In Spain, meanwhile, news of Drake-Hawkin's attack in Gran Canaria had reached the Spanish court. A fleet of 8 galleons and 13 other vessels (mainly hulks and pinnaces) under Captain General Don Bernardino de Avellaneda, with Juan Gutiérrez de Garibay as Admiral, Juan de Villaviciosa as flag captain, and about 3,000 men aboard, was dispatched from Sevilla to Cuba, which was supposed to be menaced by the English. In early March they arrived at Cartagena de Indias, disposed to pursue Baskerville.

== Battle ==
On March 7, part of Avellaneda's fleet surprised two English ships south of Cienfuegos. They were the Pegasine and were commanded by Thomas Maynarde. Engaged by the Spaniards, they received extensive damage, but finally managed to escape avoiding the dangerous shoals of Pinar del Río, and reached England on May 3, just a week before Avellaneda encountered the bulk of the English fleet supplying of wood and water at Guaniguanicos Cove, in the Island of Pinos, south of Cuba. Avellaneda immediately ordered his ships hoist their flags and attack. Baskerville, whose flagship was John Hawkin's La Garlande, however, tried to avoid combat scattering his ships towards Cape San Antonio. Most of the English ships escaped because they abandoned their boats and threw their baggage into the water. Vice Admiral Juan Gutiérrez de Garibay's three-ship vanguard managed to intercept and capture two ships: a 300-man galleon and a 25-man patache whose prisoners were put to work on Havana's fortifications. The loss on the Spanish side amounted to 80 men killed or wounded and a warship, sunk during the clash.

== Aftermath ==
Avellaneda's fleet pursued the English as far as the Old Bahama Channel. On 22 May, returning to Havana, they captured John Crosse’s pinnace Little Exchange off the town. This was not the last loss suffered by the English, as only eight of the 28 warships which had departed England on 1595 returned to their country. The survivors reached Plymouth at the same time the Spanish treasure fleet disembarked at Sanlúcar de Barrameda with 20 million silver dollars, one of the largest shipments ever to arrive from the Americas.
