= Brianda de Acuña =

Spanish nun and writer

Sor Brianda de Acuña
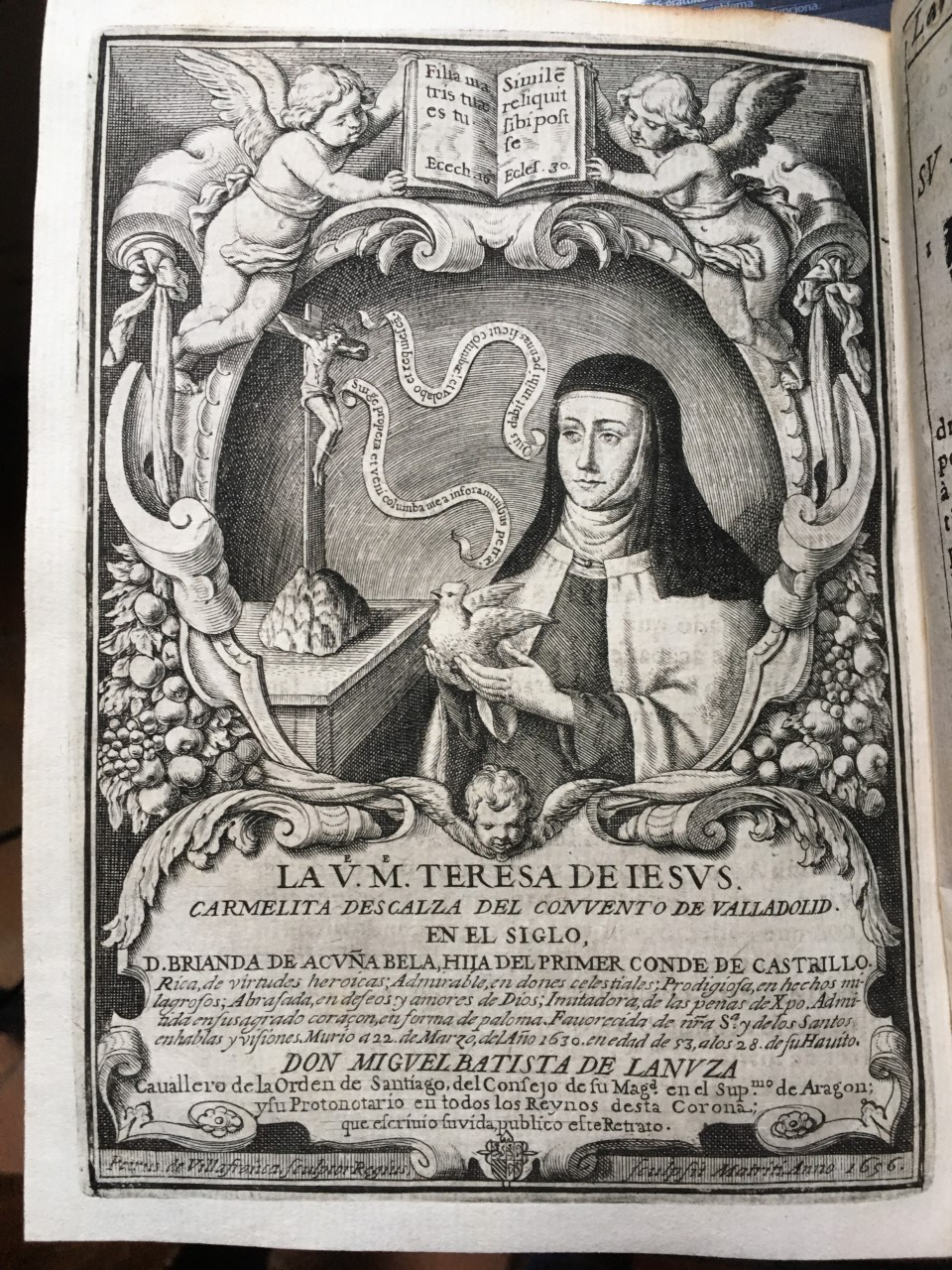
- Engraving of Brianda de Acuña by Pedro de Villafranca (1656) in Virtudes de la V. M. Teresa de Iesus... (1657) by Miguel Batista de Lanuza

Personal life
- Born: Brianda de Acuña Vela; 17 August 1576 Valverde, La Rioja, Spain
- Died: 22 March 1630 (aged 53)
- Parent: Bernardino González de Avellaneda (father)

Religious life
- Religion: Roman Catholic
- Order: Discalced Carmelites
- Monastic name: Teresa de Jesús
- Profession: Nun; autobiographer

Brianda de Acuña Vela (religious name, Teresa de Jesús; Valverde, La Rioja, 17 August 1576 – 22 March 1630) was a Spanish nun and writer. At the Convent of Santa Teresa, Valladolid, where she took the religious name "Teresa de Jesús", she served as prioress and the mistress of novices.

== Biography ==
Brianda de Acuña Vela was born in the town of Valverde, about a 100 kilometres (62 mi) from Logroño, on 17 August 1576. She was the daughter of Bernardino González de Avellaneda and María Vela de Acuña, Count of Castrillo. She lived in Aranda de Duero and Castrillo, travelling between the two on horseback. When her father was named Viceroy of Navarre, Brianda stayed behind and lived with the Countess of Miranda, with whom she was related.

Her religious faith grew, until, at the age of 26, Acuña entered the Convent of Santa Teresa in Valladolid, a cloistered convent for Discalced Carmelite nuns, where she took the name of "Teresa de Jesús". The access ceremony, celebrated on 10 January 1602, was attended by the king and queen, Philip III of Spain and Margaret of Austria, Queen of Spain. The admission took place on 2 April 1603. In the convent, she was mistress of novices and also prioress. She distinguished herself for following a penitent life.

Acuña wrote her own autobiography, some of whose chapters were published in a book about her written by Miguel Batista de Lanuza in the year 1657, entitled Virtudes de la V. M. Teresa de Iesus, Carmelita Descalza del convento de Valladolid, en el siglo Doña Brianda de Acuña Vela, printed in Zaragoza by Jusepe Lanaga y Lamarca. Its pages include an account of her time in the convent:

Sus silicios fueron siempre de los más penosos. Solía andar ceñida con una cadena de hierro de agudas puntas y cuatro dedos de ancho, muy apretada a la cintura o a las espaldas. De lo mismo traía en los brazos unas cadenas como brazaletes, y sobre los muslos otras... Nunca esperaba a sanar de las primeras llagas para hacer las segundas. Renovábanse en cada disciplina y como caían en parte dolorida y lastimada y en cuerpo flaco, delicado y enfermo, estaba siempre en un continuo matirio.

Her silicons were always the most painful. She used to be girded with an iron chain with sharp points and four fingers wide, very tight around the waist or behind her back. In the same way, she wore chains like bracelets in her arms, and others on her thighs... She never waited to heal from the first sores to make the second ones. She renewed herself in each discipline and as they fell partly sore and hurt and in a skinny, delicate and sick body, she was always in a continuous state of torment.

— Miguel Batista de Lanuza, Virtudes de la V. M. Teresa de Iesus... (1657)

In that same book, De Lanuza also makes a physical description of Acuña:

Tuvo el cuerpo aunque delgado y alto con buena proporción. La cabeza no grande. El rostro sí. La frente un poco levantada por el medio. Las cejas bien hechas y no muy pobladas, su color castaño claro. Algo caídos los ojos, más redondos que rasgados, pero alegres, con mucha gravedad. El color de las niñas era cavellado oscuro. Las pestañas del color de las cejas. La nariz larga y sin encorvar, el nacimientoe strecho y el pico algo grueso y caído. La boca de buen tamaño. Los labios entre gruesos y delgados y de buena color, la barba con la proporción de las demás facciones. Las mejillas (aunque ya flacas) tuvo llenas en su juventud. De su natural era blanca, mas con las enfermedades y penitencias tenía el color amarillo y muy macilento. Todo el encaje de la cara era muy bueno y ponía fácilmente sereno el semblante. Tuvo las manos largas y de buena hechura. Este es su retrato.

Shee had a slim and tall body with good proportion. The head not big. Her face yes. The forehead a little raised in the middle. The eyebrows well made and not very populated, their color, light brown. Her eyes slightly droopy, more round than slanted, but happy, with a lot of gravity. The color of the girls was dark brown. The eyelashes the color of the eyebrows. The nose is long and not curved, the nose is narrow and its beak is somewhat thick and drooping. Good size mouth. Her lips between thick and thin and of good color, her chin with the proportion of the other features. Her cheeks (although thin already) were full in her youth. Naturally she was white, but with illnesses and penances, she had a yellow color and was very emaciated. The whole look of her face was very good and easily made her countenance serene. She had long, well-made hands. This is her portrait.

— Miguel Batista de Lanuza, Virtudes de la V. M. Teresa de Iesus... (1657)

Pedro de Villafranca engraved Acuña's portrait on a sheet. She died on 22 March 1630.
