= Navarro-Castilian war of 1378–1379 =

The Navarro-Castilian war of 1378–1379 was part of the wider Hundred Years' War between France and England. Castile invaded the Kingdom of Navarre, overruning the west of the country before English intervention forced their retreat. The threat of a renewed invasion the next year, however, induced Navarre to sue for peace.

== Background ==
=== Causes ===
The war was caused by the expiration of the Treaty of Bruges in 1377; the web of alliances involving the Spanish kingdoms, France and England; and the various competing claims to their thrones. As early as January 1377, England sent ambassadors to Navarre and Aragon to secure their support against France. In the autumn of 1377, the French admiral Jean de Vienne went to Castile to secure the assistance of the Castilian navy in the war against England. It was probably on this occasion that the invasion of Navarre was first planned.

In 1375, Duke Louis I of Anjou acquired a claim to the defunct Kingdom of Majorca, which had been absorbed by Aragon three decades earlier. Louis immediately announced his intention of making good on his claim by military force if need by. He recruited Castile (1375) and Portugal (1377) as allies, but planned campaigns in 1376 and 1377 never materialized. By 1378, Aragon was allied with England against France and Castile.

At the same time as England was negotiating an alliance with Aragon, an English ambassador, Edward Berkeley, was sent to Navarre in January 1377. He negotiated a military alliance in which England promised to send aid in the event that Castile attacked Navarre and in exchange Navarre leased to England its ports in the Cotentin for a term of ten years.

In 1378, the French detained two agents of King Charles II of Navarre travelling through France, Jacques de Rue and Pierre du Tertre. Their documents were confiscated and they were tortured to elicit confessions. Charles II's negotiations with England were revealed in detail and France encouraged Castile to take action.

=== Preparations ===
In 1377, Charles II requested and received a war subsidy worth 30,000 pounds from the Cortes of Navarre. It does not appear, however, that Navarre was preparing offensive action. In 1378, in defensive preparations for a Castilian invasion, Navarre purchased cannons, gunpowder, bows, arrows and other weapons from Gascony. Perrin de Bordeaux, a gunsmith from Bayonne, came to Pamplona to assist in the manufacture of cannons. Other Navarrese records refer to the local manufacture of cannonballs. Cannons that fired seven-pound balls were produced at a cost of 50 florins each, while thirteen-pounders cost 70–100 florins.

On 6 January 1378, King Henry II of Castile summoned an army to muster at Logroño in April.

== Course ==
=== Castilian invasion ===
In June 1378, a Castilian army consisting of 4,000 cavalry along with archery and infantry assembled on the Navarrese border under Prince John, eldest son and heir apparent of Henry II. This was John's first command. The Castilian crossed the frontier in early July. King Charles II of Navarre had mustered his army at Olite, site of a royal palace, by the first week of July. He had 1,450 troops plus 500 foreign mercenaries from Béarn, Gascony and Catalonia. About the same number of mercenaries who had received advances failed to appear. The promised 1,000 troops from England had also not arrived. With an invasion imminent, Charles disperesed his forces along the frontier and withdrew to the capital, Pamplona.

Military resistance was limited at first. In the last week of July, Charles withdrew to Saint-Jean-Pied-de-Port north of the Pyrenees, leaving his lieutenant, Viscount Roger-Bernard II of Castellbò, in charge of the defence of Pamplona. Over the next four months, most of the south and west of Navarre was occupied by Castilian forces. The countryside was systematically looted, barns and fields destroyed and livestock carried off. Only Pamplona and Estella, defended by Gascon crossbowmen and English archers, continued to resist.

Tax assessments made after the war attest to the destruction wrought by the Castilian army during these months. Only ten out of 200 parishes in the province of Estella were capable of paying their normal assessment. All the rest had their assessments reduced because of the effects of the war. In some parishes, no taxes were owed at all. Thirty villages in the vicinity of Pamplona were razed to the ground. Many castles that at first offered refuge were stormed and taken.

In late October 1378, Charles II went to Bordeaux to seek assistance from his nominal English ally, John Neville, lieutenant of the Duchy of Aquitaine. In Bordeaux, Charles tried to borrow money. Neville gave him 400 troops (rather than the promised 1,000) under the command of Thomas Trivet with the understanding that after Pamplona had been relieved Trivet would take command of Tudela. Trivet left Bordeaux in the final week of October and met Charles at Sain-Jean-Pied-de-Port in mid-November. In early November, Neville sent Géraud de Menta to Barcelona to negotiate the intervention of King Peter IV of Aragon.

=== Winter ===
King Charles and the English reinforcements crossed the mountains via the Pass of Roncesvalles, but the Castilians lifted the siege of Pamplona at news of their approach, perhaps believing that the English force was much larger than it was. Prince John retired to Logroño and dispersed his army for the winter after leaving garrisons in the most important captured towns.

Charles II reentered Pamplona in early December. He immediately convoked the Cortes to approve a new subsidy of 60,000 florins. On 11 December, the king, the viscount of Castellbò and Trivet left Pamplona at the head of an army of about 800–1,000, including some 400 Englishmen, to reinforce Tudela. Trivet occupied the the alcazaba while a portion of his force went with the viscount of Castellbò to reinforce Cascante.

On 24 December, Trivet, with a party of 300 cavalry, launched a raid on Soria. They marched overnight, intending to surprise the town on Christmas morning, but were disperesed in a snowstorm and lost the element of surprise. There was a skirmish at the gates of the town before Trivet withdrew. He arrived in Cascante on 27 December, having burned some smaller towns along the border. A few days after his Christmas raid, Trivet attacked Alfaro. He successfully lured the garrison out of the town and defeated it but the women closed the gates before he could enter.

== Truce and peace ==
On 12 February 1379, Henry II summoned the army to reassemble at Logroño in April for another invasion of Navarre. Charles II asked for peace terms and a truce of six weeks was agreed in order to hammer out the details. Juan Ramírez de Arellano was dispatched to Burgos in March to negotiate. The terms offered by Castile and accepted by Navarre were harsh.

The Treaty of Briones was signed on 31 March and ratified on 18 April. Charles II agreed to enter into a military alliance with Castile against all foes, including England. As security, twenty fortresses, including Tudela, were to be occupied by Castilian garrisons for a period of ten years. Estella was to be held by Ramírez de Arellano under the joint suzerainty of Henry II and Charles II. The foreign soldiers in Navarre were to be paid off and sent home, for which effort Castile loaned Navarre 20,000 doblas.

== Aftermath ==
The Anglo-Gascon force under Trivet responded to the February truce by raiding the territory around Tudela. Trivet challenged the Castilians of Logroño to an arranged battle with one hundred men on each side but he was refused. In May, he withdrew to Pamplona and received his final payment from Charles. He had returned to Bordeaux.

The fortresses occupied by Castile had all been returned to Navarrese control by 1387, after the death of Charles II.

== Bibliography ==
- Azcárate, Pilar (1989). "Un apunte sobre la guerra castellano-navarra de 1378: La suerte de la villa de Mendigorria". Mayurqa. 22 (1): 37–48.
- Diago Hernando, Máximo (1994). "Política y guerra en la frontera castellano-navarra durante la época Trastamara" (PDF). Príncipe de Viana. 55 (203): 527–550.
- Lacarra, José María (1973). Historia política del reino de Navarra desde sus orígenes hasta su incorporación a Castilla. Vol. 3. Editorial Aranzadi.
- Russell, P. E. (1955). The English Intervention in Spain and Portugal in the Time of Edward III and Richard II. Clarendon Press.
- Sumption, Jonathan (2009). The Hundred Years War, Volume III: Divided Houses. Faber and Faber.
