= Bernardino de Avellaneda =

Spanish sailor and politician

Bernardino González de Avellaneda y Delgadillo, 1st Count of Castrillo, (Aranda de Duero, 18 October 1544 - Madrid, 6 December 1629) was a Spanish sailor and politician in the service of Kings Philip II, Philip III and Philip IV. He was captain general of the Spanish Royal Navy, president of the Casa de Contratación, Assistante (Mayor) of Seville and Viceroy of Navarre.

== Biography ==
He was the first-born son of Juan González de Avellaneda y Delgadillo, Lord of Valverde, Alcoba de la Torre, Alcubilla de Avellaneda and Santa María del Mercadillo, and his wife Francisca de Leiva y Guevara, sister of Sancho Martínez de Leiva (1509-1579), Viceroy of Navarre and captain general of the galleys of Naples and Spain.

=== Military career ===
At the age of ten he lost his father and at thirteen he entered the service of his uncle Sancho Martínez de Leiva, captain general of the galleys of Naples. In this squadron of galleys, and under the orders of his uncle, he participated in June 1563 in the relief of Mazalquivir, besieged by the Turks. After this victory, and in order to clear the coast of Africa of pirates, he took part in an expedition that attempted to take the rock of Vélez de la Gomera by surprise. In this failed enterprise he was wounded, but in 1564 he participated in a new assault on the rock that was crowned with success under the orders of García Álvarez de Toledo y Osorio, Viceroy of Sicily.

Later he travelled to Italy and participated in the mobilisation of troops bound for Corsica, in the face of the growing Turkish threat. Later he took part in the relief of La Goleta, a Spanish garrison in North Africa, and worked on its fortification. In 1566 he was appointed captain of the flagship galley.

On Christmas 1568 he left the galleys and took part in the suppression of the uprising in the Alpujarras, where he was wounded and his brother Sancho died.

In 1580, he served under Miguel de Oquendo in the occupation of Portugal (1580) and the Conquest of the Azores (1583). He probably also participated in the Spanish Armada in 1588 against England.

=== On the hunt for Sir Francis Drake ===
After serving as Admiral of the Portuguese fleet (1591-1594), based in Lisbon, which formed part of the Royal Spanish Navy of the Ocean, he was promoted to Capitain General in 1594.
The following year he had to fully equip the fleet, including urcas and pataches, to go in search of an English fleet of 28 ships that, under the orders of admirals Francis Drake and John Hawkins, was heading for the Caribbean. He set sail from Lisbon on 2 January 1596, with 19 ships, but only 8 galleons, attacking the superior enemy force on 11 March in sight of the island of Pinos. Hawkins and Drake had already died of disease during the voyage, so Sir Thomas Baskerville took command. In the Battle of Pinos, Bernardino de Avellaneda was victorious and captured 2 English ships. He returned triumphantly to Sanlúcar, where on 1 October 1596 he brought one of the largest shipments of gold and silver in history which he escorted, his own squadron, the prizes, and 350 English prisoners.

=== Government positions ===
The king rewarded him with the presidency of the Casa de Contratación in Seville. In 1603 he was also appointed Assistante (Mayor) of Seville, serving in both positions until 1609. During these years he prepared and dispatched various fleets, being the highest political and military authority in Seville.

On 2 January 1610, King Philip III granted him the noble title of Count of Castrillo. On the same date, he was appointed Mayordomo mayor and Sumiller de Corps of Prince Filiberto of Savoy, whom he had to accompany to El Puerto de Santa María two years later, when the latter was appointed Generalissimo of the Sea. From 1618 he was Mayordomo mayor of Princess (later Queen) Isabel de Borbón, first consort of Philip IV.

In August 1621 he was given a seat on the Council of War and at the end of the following year he was elected to serve as Viceroy of Navarre. From 1623 until his death he was viceroy and captain general of Navarre, an appointment that also included that of captain general of Guipúzcoa.

When the Count of Castrillo died in 1629, he had gathered an impressive library and collection of paintings.

=== Marriage and children ===
He had married Isabel Delgadillo de Avellaneda, daughter of Juan Álvarez Delgadillo, lord of Castrillo and Cevico Navero. They had :

- Juan de Avellaneda Delgadillo y Vela Leiva, predeceased his father, had issue :
  - María de Avellaneda Delgadillo y Portocarrero, 2nd Countess of Castrillo, married García de Avellaneda y Haro, son of the Marquis of Carpio,
- Lope, predeceased his father,
- Brianda de Acuña (1576-1630), a nun and writer.

Government offices
Preceded by Juan de Mendoza, Marquis de la Hinojosa	Viceroy of Navarre; 1623–1629	Succeeded by Fernando Girón de Salcedo
