= Alcanadre =

- Municipality
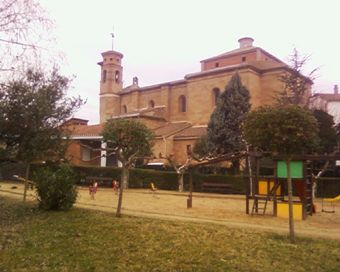
- A park beside a church, Alcanadre

- Coat of arms

- Location in La Rioja Location in Spain
- Coordinates: 42°24′18″N 2°7′10″W
- Country: Spain
- Autonomous community: La Rioja
- Comarca: Logroño

Area
  - Total: 31 km^{2} (12 sq mi)
- Elevation: 346 m (1,135 ft)

Population (2025-01-01)
  - Total: 685
  - Density: 22/km^{2} (57/sq mi)
- Time zone: UTC+1 (CET)
  - Summer (DST): UTC+2 (CET)
- Postal code: 26509
- Website: Official website

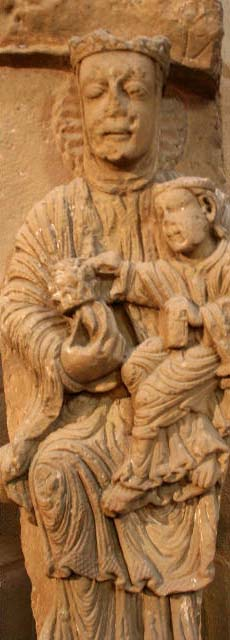
Templar detail (virgen de aradon) at church.

Alcanadre is a town and municipality in La Rioja province in northern Spain. The town is located along the Ebro River, between Logroño and Calahorra. Alcanadre has a temperate, Mediterranean climate. Its major agricultural products are wine, olive oil, almonds, and grain. The town is home to the shrine of Saint Aradón, ruins of a Roman aqueduct from the 1st century and the church of Santa María de la Asunción.
