= Valdemadera =

- Municipality
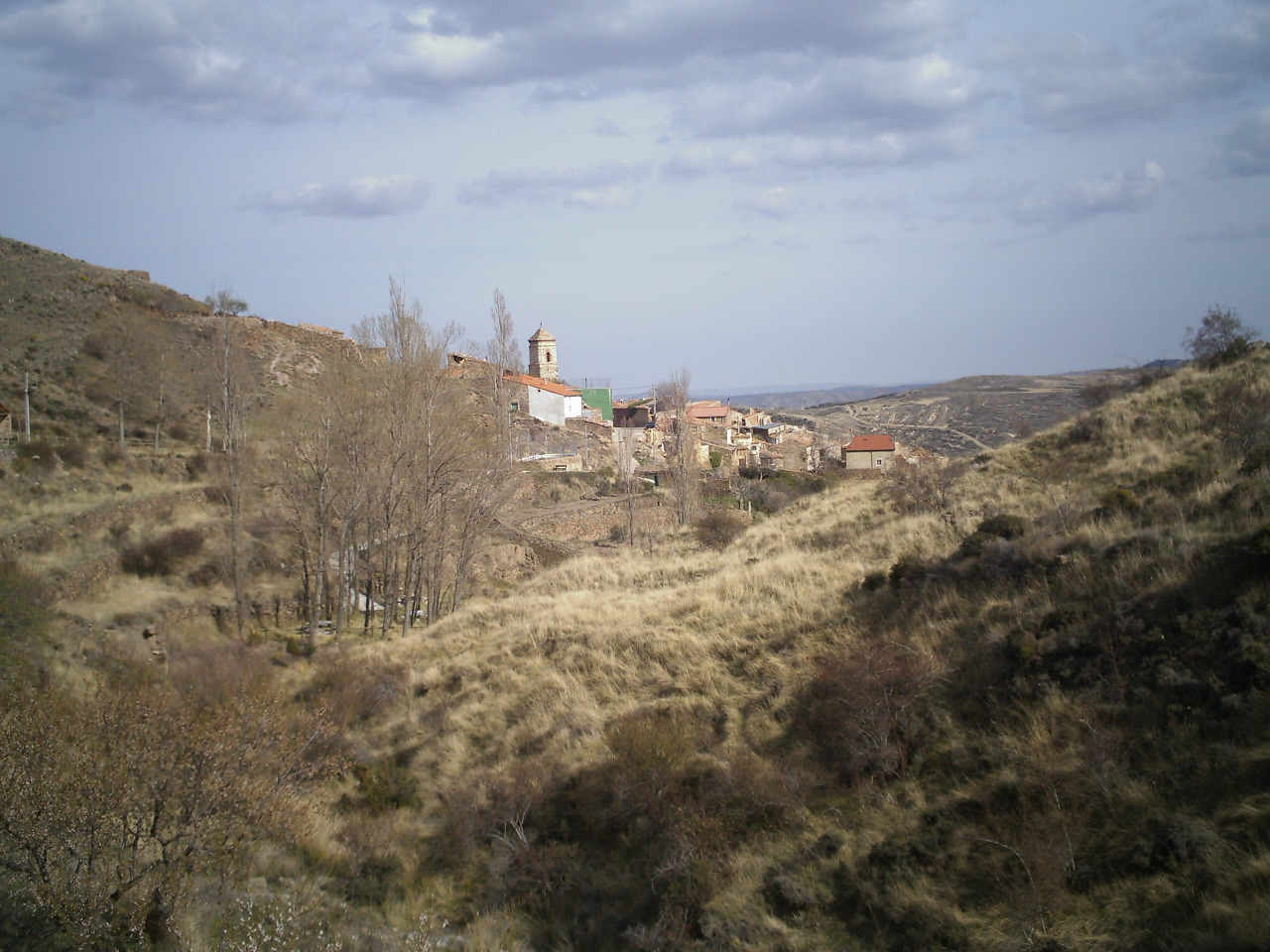
- Skyline of Valdemadera

- Location within La Rioja, Spain Location within Spain
- Coordinates: 41°59′02″N 2°04′26″W
- Country: Spain
- Autonomous community: La Rioja
- Comarca: Cervera

Government
  - Mayor: Ildefonso Fernández Muñoz (PP)

Area
  - Total: 13.93 km^{2} (5.38 sq mi)
- Elevation: 975 m (3,199 ft)

Population (2025-01-01)
  - Total: 15
- Postal code: 26532
- Website: Official website

Valdemadera is a village in the province and autonomous community of La Rioja, Spain. The municipality covers an area of 13.93 square kilometres (5.38 sq mi) and as of 2011 had a population of 9 people.
