= Navajún =

- Municipality
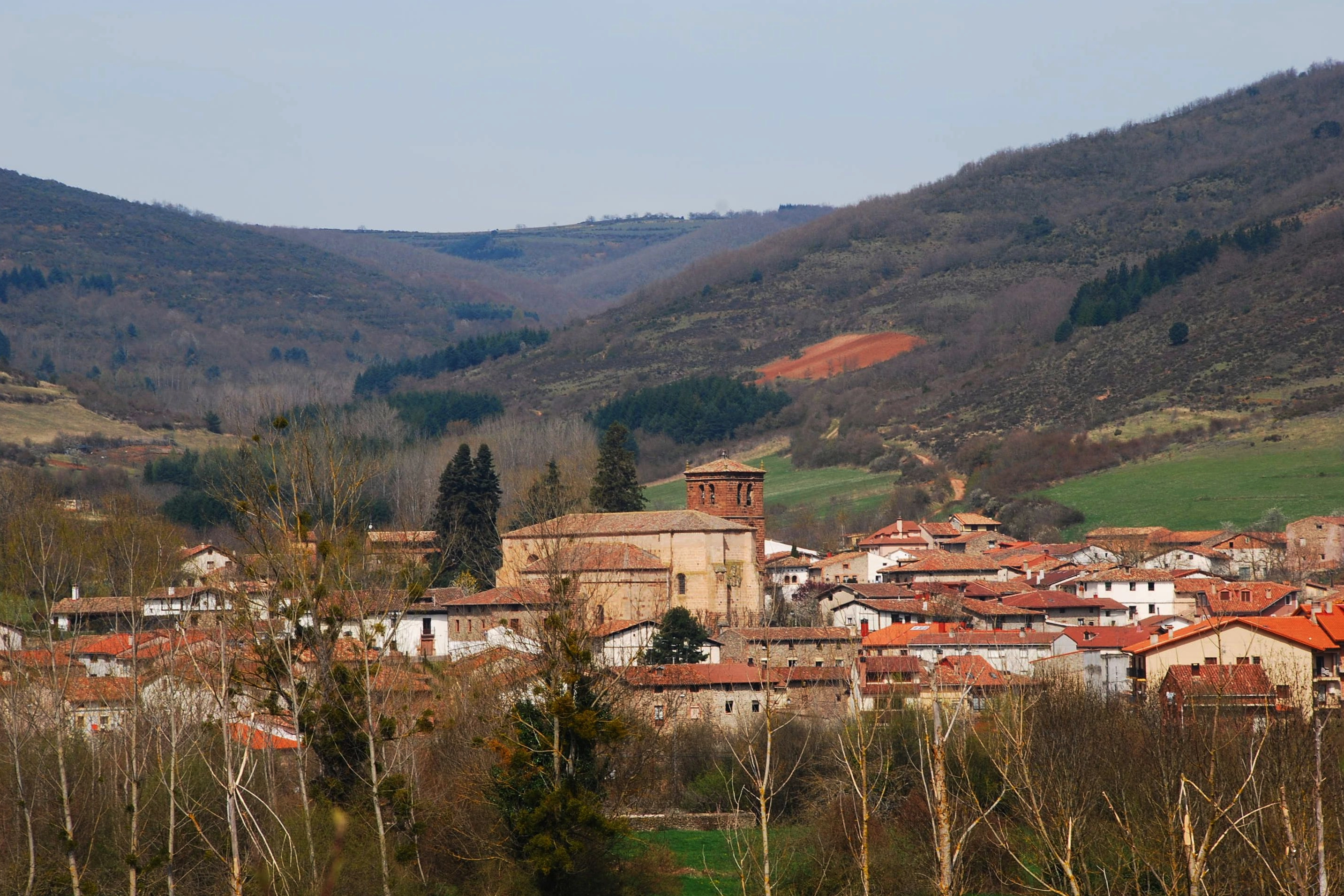
- Skyline of Navajún

- Location within La Rioja, Spain Location within Spain
- Coordinates: 41°57′50″N 2°05′55″W
- Country: Spain
- Autonomous community: La Rioja
- Comarca: Cervera

Government
  - Mayor: Blas Fernández Laya (PSOE)

Area
  - Total: 16.38 km^{2} (6.32 sq mi)
- Elevation: 930 m (3,050 ft)

Population (2025-01-01)
  - Total: 8
- Demonym: navajunense
- Postal code: 26533
- Website: www.navajun.org

Navajún is a village in the province and autonomous community of La Rioja, Spain. The municipality covers an area of 16.38 square kilometres (6.32 sq mi) and as of 2023 had a population of 8 people.
