= Castilruiz =

- Municipality
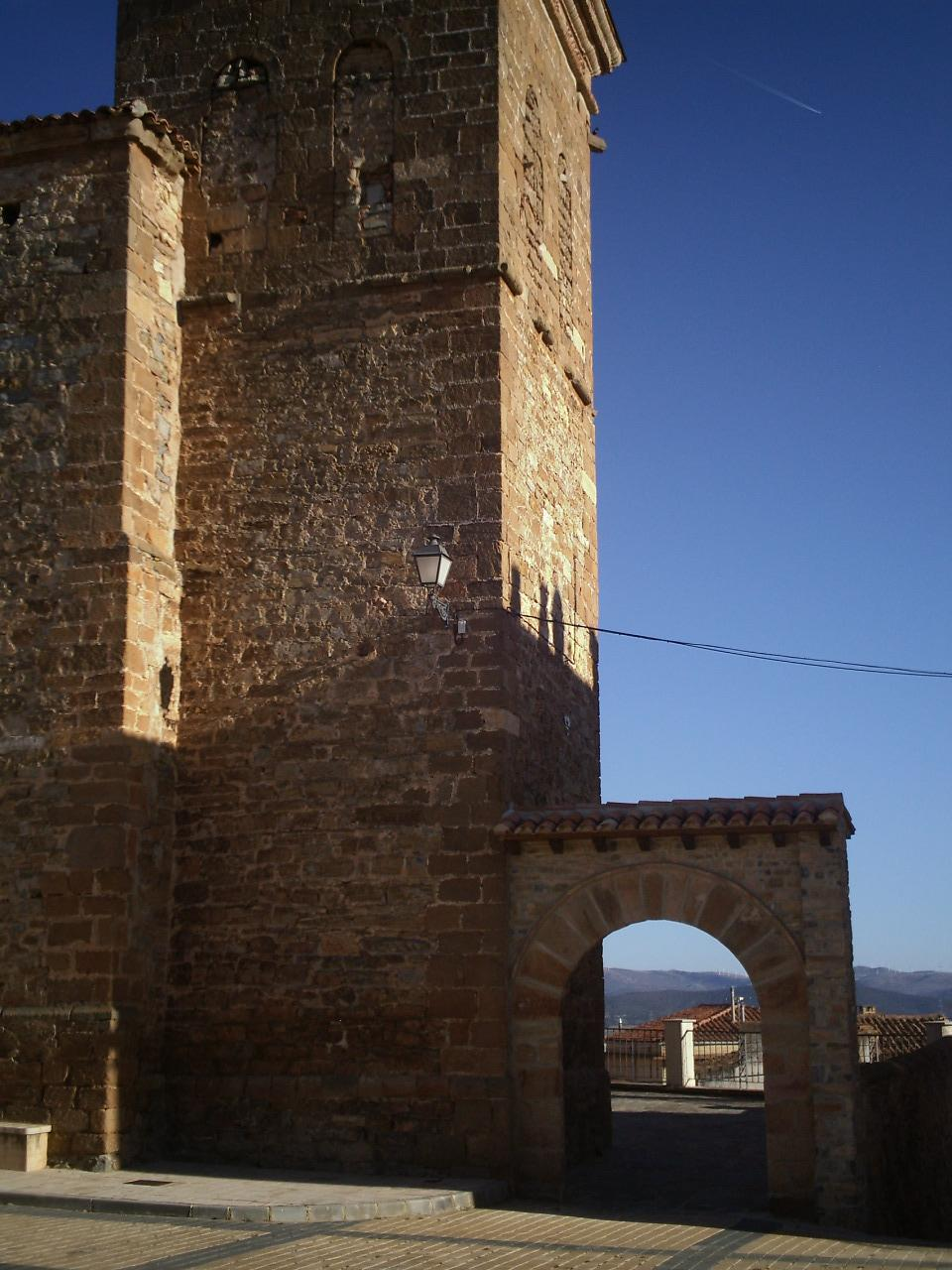
- Partial view of the parish church.

- Location in Spain. Castilruiz (Spain)
- Country: Spain
- Autonomous community: Castile and León
- Province: Soria
- Municipality: Castilruiz

Area
  - Total: 38 km^{2} (15 sq mi)

Population (2025-01-01)
  - Total: 170
  - Density: 4.5/km^{2} (12/sq mi)
- Time zone: UTC+1 (CET)
  - Summer (DST): UTC+2 (CEST)
- Website: Official website

Castilruiz is a municipality in the province of Soria, Castile and León, Spain. According to the 2022 census (INE), the municipality has a population of 150 inhabitants.
