= Balthazar Alvarez =

Spanish Catholic mystic (1534–1580)

Balthazar Alvarez (April 1534 – July 25, 1580) was a Spanish Catholic mystic and was the spiritual director of Saint Teresa.

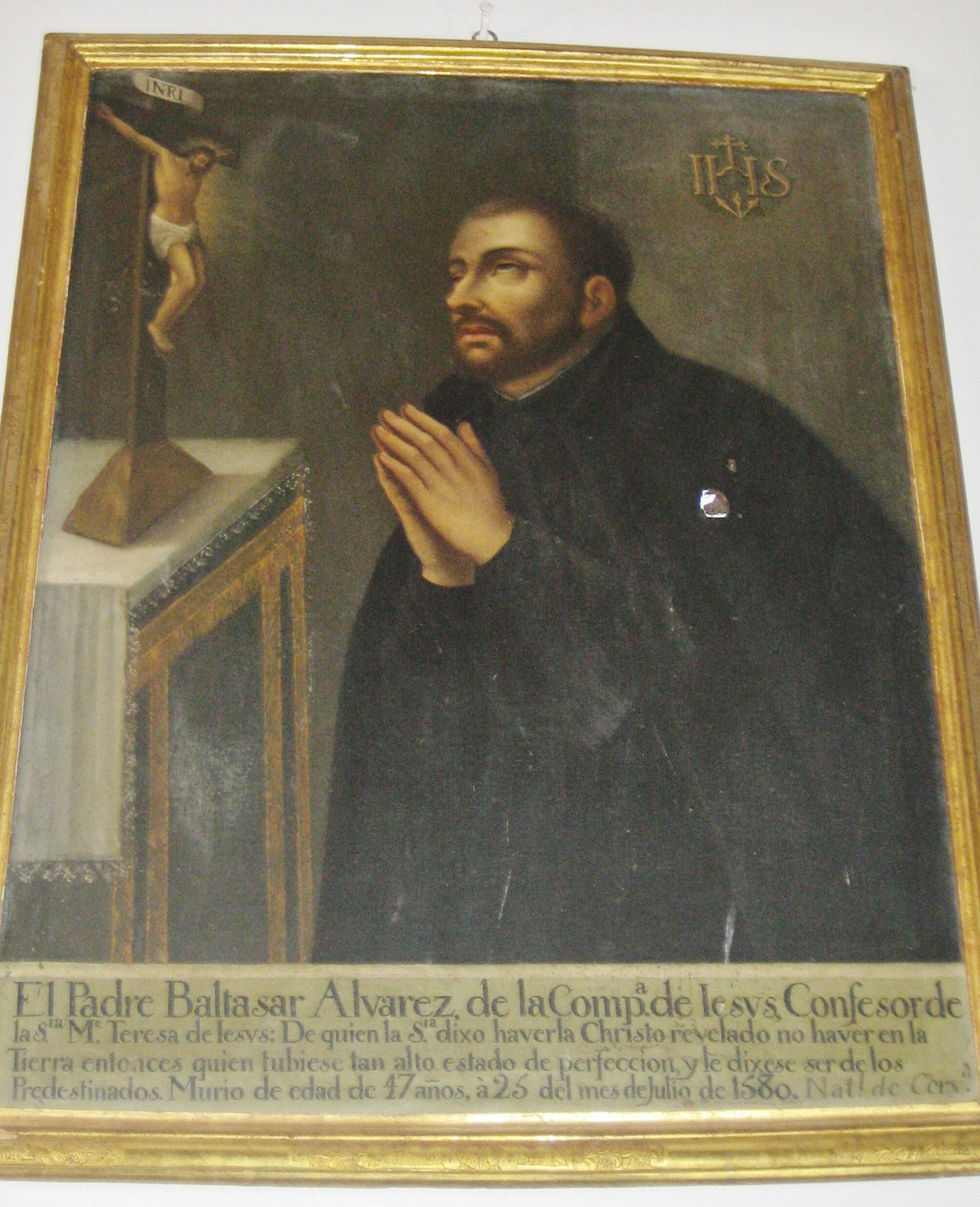
Painting of Balthazar Alvarez, San Gil parish, Cervera del Río Alhama

== Life ==
Alvarez was born in Cervera del Río Alhama, Spain, in April 1534 to a noble family. He studied philosophy and theology in the University of Alcalá. His inclination was first towards the Carthusians because of their life of contemplation, but finally he entered the Society of Jesus at Alcalá in 1555, fifteen years after its foundation. In the novitiate of Simancas he met Francis Borgia and a strong affection was established between them. He resumed his philosophical and theological studies at Alcalá and Ávila, under the guidance of the Dominicans, for at that time in Spain the Society of Jesus had no college for theological studies of its own.

Although continual interruptions of his studies impeded his progress in scholastic theology, he did advance in the field of mystical theology. He became confessor, master of novices, rector, provincial, and visitor. Alvarez was drawn to asceticism and mortification, and recommended this approach to those under his supervision.

He was ordained a priest in 1558. At the age of twenty-six was appointed minister in Ávila. There he became the spiritual director for a number of individuals, including Saint Teresa, with whom he was rather severe, charging her with being frivolous. He was at first skeptical of her accounts of mystical experience, until he later experienced something similar. Because of his connection with the Carmelite nun, some of the opposition she encountered in her efforts of reform was directed at him as well.

Alvarez not only guided her in matters of the spirit, but defended her from her critics, encouraged her in her work of reform, and had much to do with framing the rules of the new Order. Alvarez's direction of Teresa continued for seven years. She said that it was revealed to her that there was no one in the world who surpassed him in sanctity. They maintained correspondence when he was away.

In March 1567 he reportedly received the gift of infused contemplation. One result was that he became less disturbed by his own failings, and more tolerant of others. In 1574 he was made rector of Salamanca and visitor of the Province of Aragon. In 1579 he was about to be sent as provincial to Peru but that project was never carried out.

In 1573, Juan Suarez and Gil Gonzalez, delegates at General Congregation in Rome, raised the matter of Alvarez’s method of silent prayer, as it did not conform to Ignatius’s Exercises. Alvarez was compelled to write an account of it to the General of the Society of Jesus, Everard Mercurian, who approved of it, but did not condone it as a general practice. At the same time, he expressed his esteem for Alvarez and employed him in multiple offices. Alvarez died at Belmonte in 1580.
