= Dévanos =

- Municipality
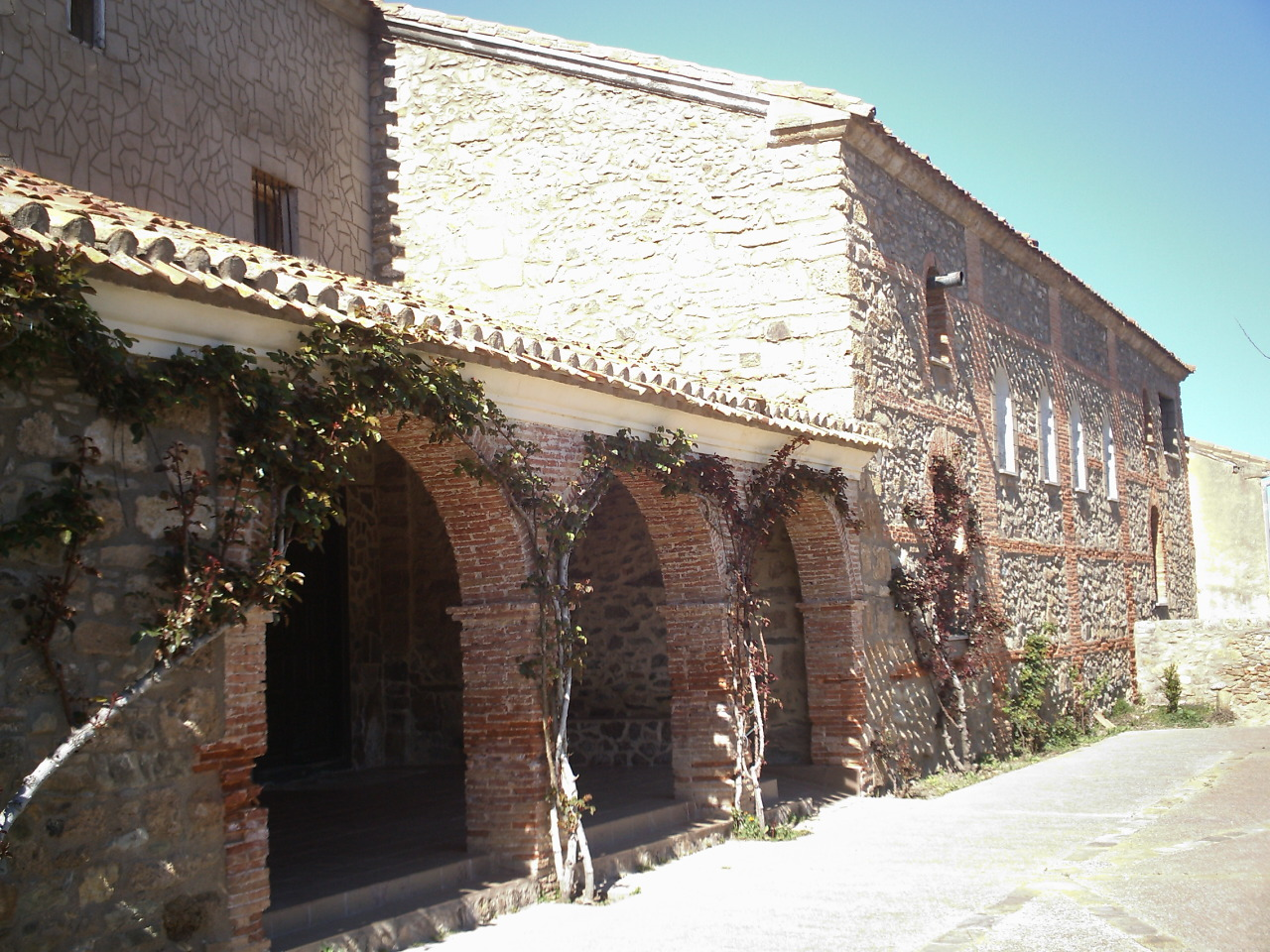

- Coat of arms

- Location in Spain. Dévanos (Spain)
- Country: Spain
- Autonomous community: Castile and León
- Province: Soria
- Municipality: Dévanos

Area
  - Total: 16 km^{2} (6.2 sq mi)

Population (2025-01-01)
  - Total: 72
  - Density: 4.5/km^{2} (12/sq mi)
- Time zone: UTC+1 (CET)
  - Summer (DST): UTC+2 (CEST)
- Website: Official website

Dévanos is a municipality located in the province of Soria, Castile and León, Spain. According to the 2004 census (INE), the municipality has a population of 115 inhabitants.
