= Arrúbal =

- Municipality
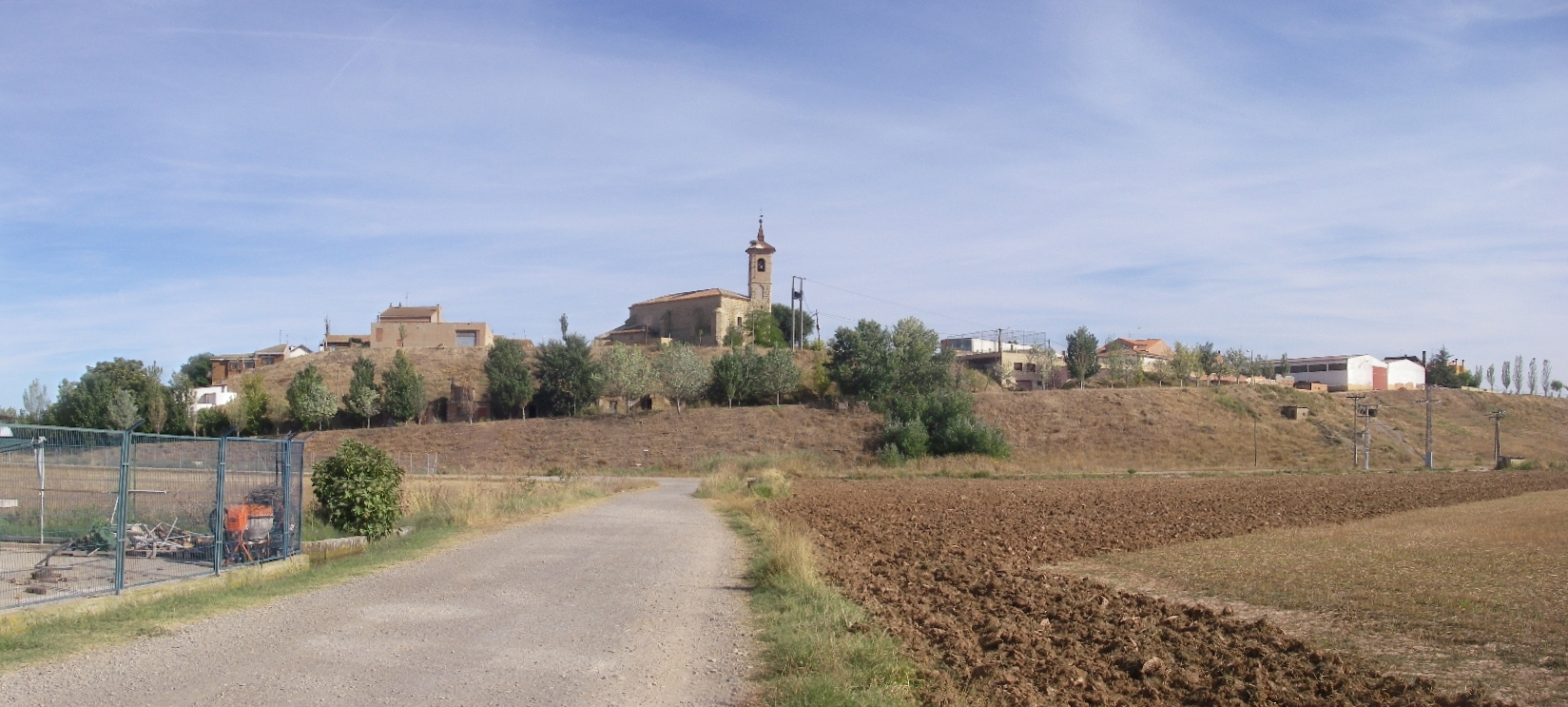
- Skyline of Arrúbal

- Flag Coat of arms

- Location within La Rioja, Spain Location within Spain
- Coordinates: 42°26′07″N 2°15′04″W
- Country: Spain
- Autonomous community: La Rioja
- Comarca: Logroño

Government
  - Mayor: María Nieves San Pedro Balmaseda (PSOE)

Area
  - Total: 7.35 km^{2} (2.84 sq mi)
- Elevation: 356 m (1,168 ft)

Population (2025-01-01)
  - Total: 566
- Demonym(s): arrubaleño, ña
- Postal code: 26151
- Website: www.arrubal.com

Arrúbal is a village in the province and autonomous community of La Rioja, Spain. The municipality covers an area of 7.35 square kilometres (2.84 sq mi) and as of 2011 had a population of 491 people.
