= Cigudosa =

- Municipality
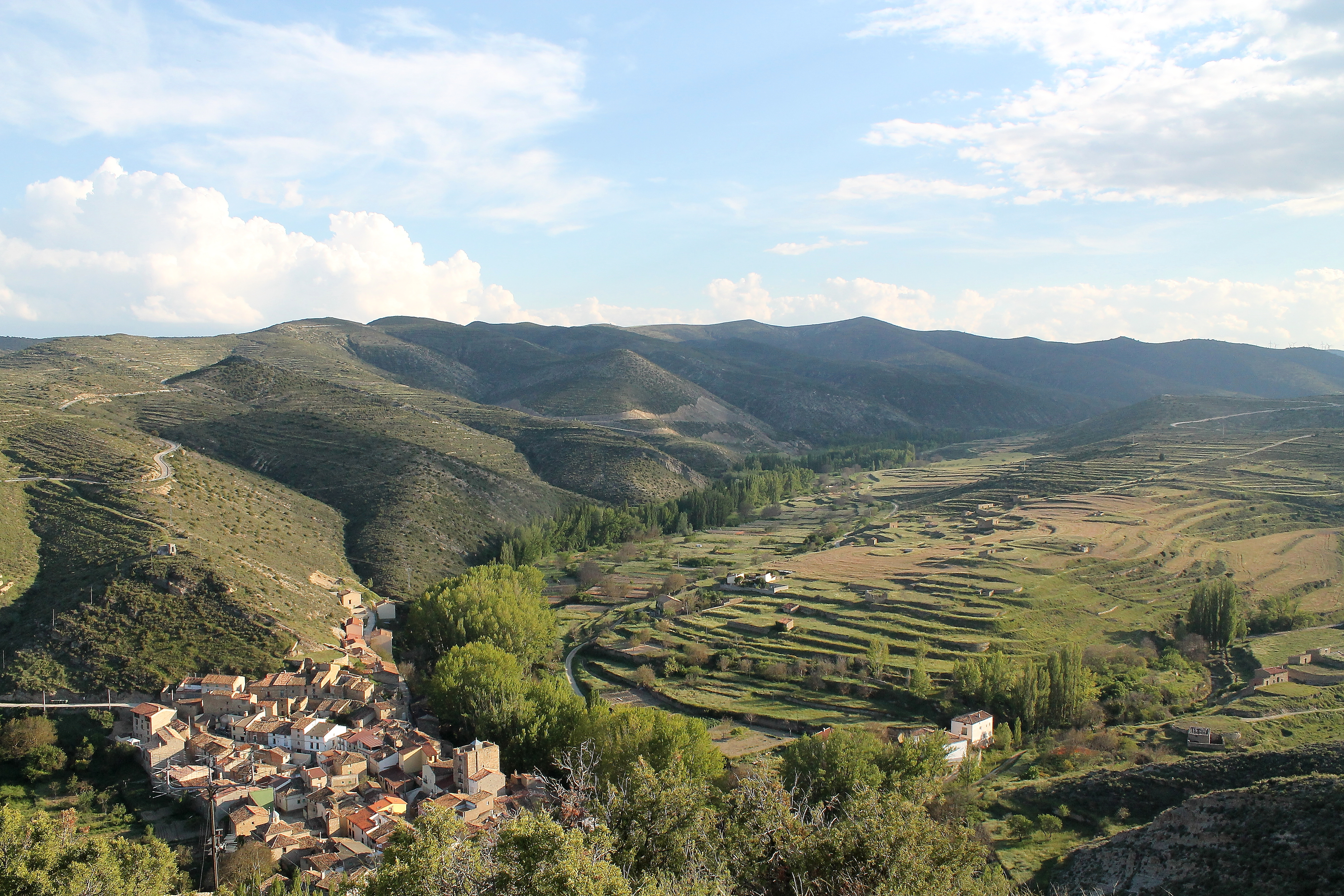

- Location in Spain. Cigudosa (Spain)
- Country: Spain
- Autonomous community: Castile and León
- Province: Soria
- Municipality: Cigudosa

Area
  - Total: 21.03 km^{2} (8.12 sq mi)
- Elevation: 735 m (2,411 ft)

Population (2025-01-01)
  - Total: 14
  - Density: 0.67/km^{2} (1.7/sq mi)
- Time zone: UTC+1 (CET)
  - Summer (DST): UTC+2 (CEST)
- Website: Official website

Cigudosa is a municipality located in the province of Soria, Castile and León, Spain. According to the 2004 census (INE), the municipality had a population of 57 inhabitants.
