= Comarca de Cervera =

Cervera
- Comarca
- Interactive map of Cervera
- Coordinates: 41.997389°N 2.025778°W
- Country: Spain

Cervera is a comarca in La Rioja province in Spain.
