= Church of Santa María (Fuenmayor) =

- Iglesia de Santa María (Spanish)
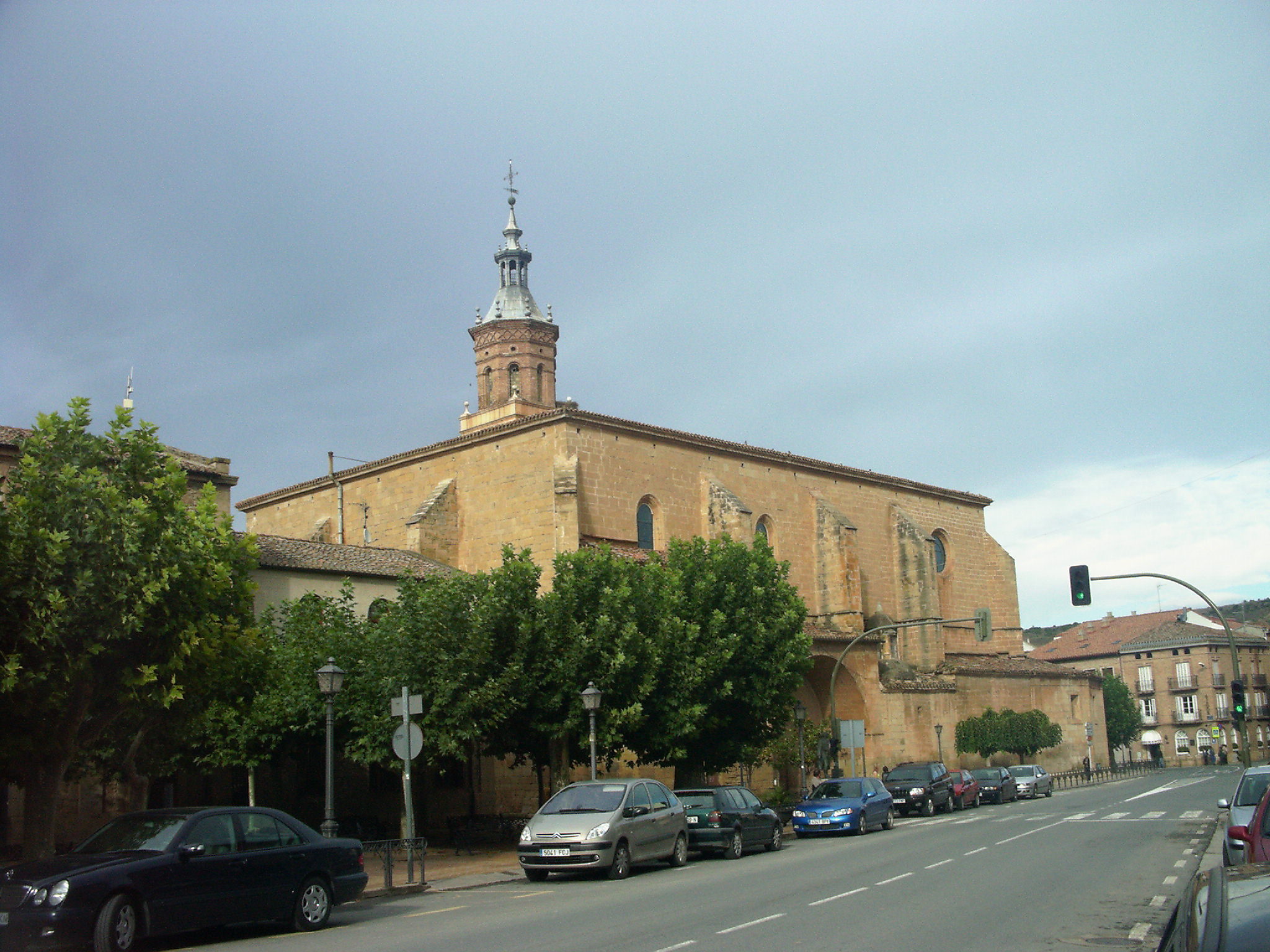

- Location within Spain
- 42.467036°N 2.56197°W
- Location: Fuenmayor, Spain

Spanish Cultural Heritage
- Official name: Iglesia de Santa María
- Type: Non-movable
- Criteria: Monument
- Designated: 1981
- Reference no.: RI-51-0004556

The Church of Santa María (Spanish: Iglesia de Santa María) is a church located in Fuenmayor, Spain. It was declared Bien de Interés Cultural in 1981.
