= Fuenmayor =

- Municipality
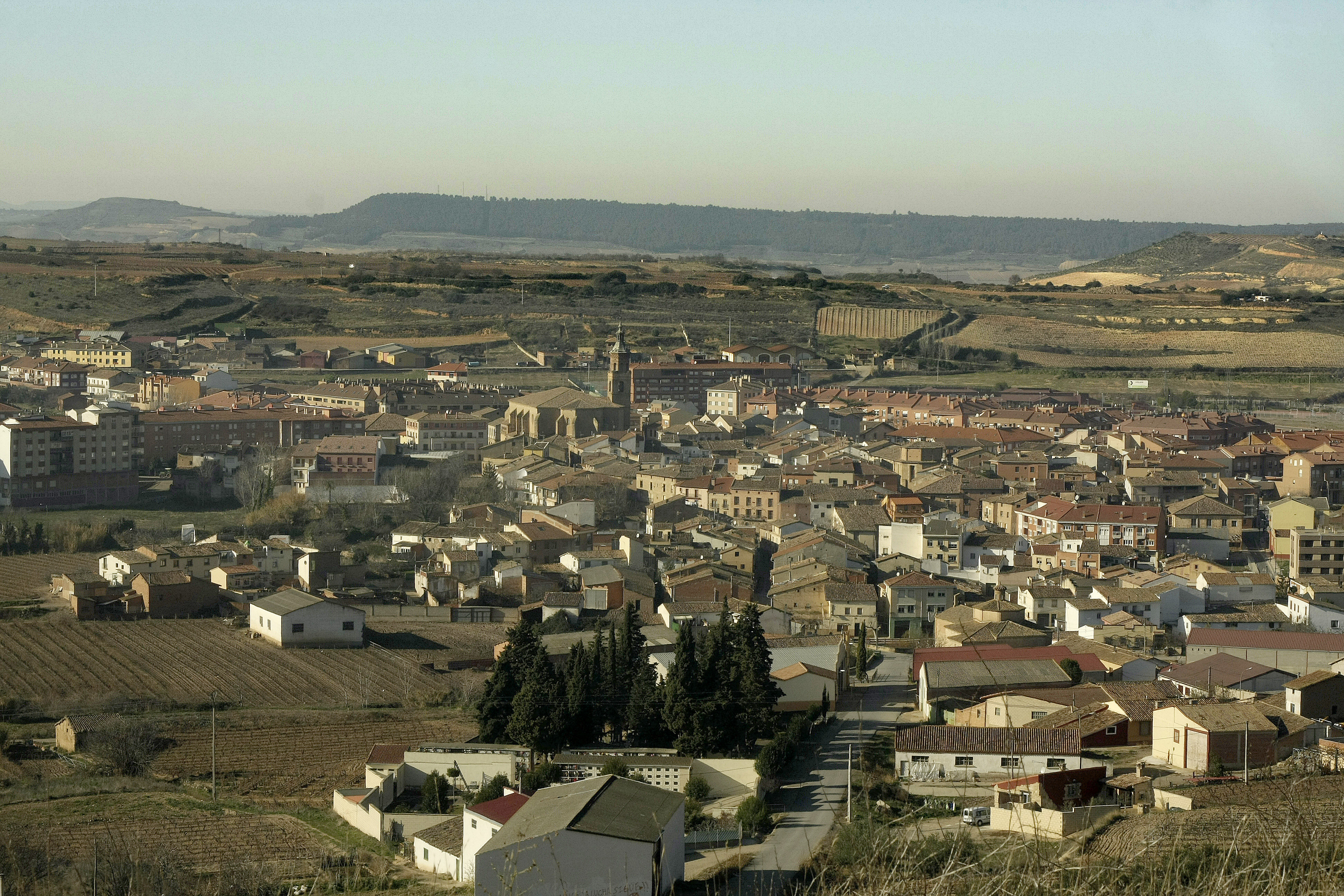
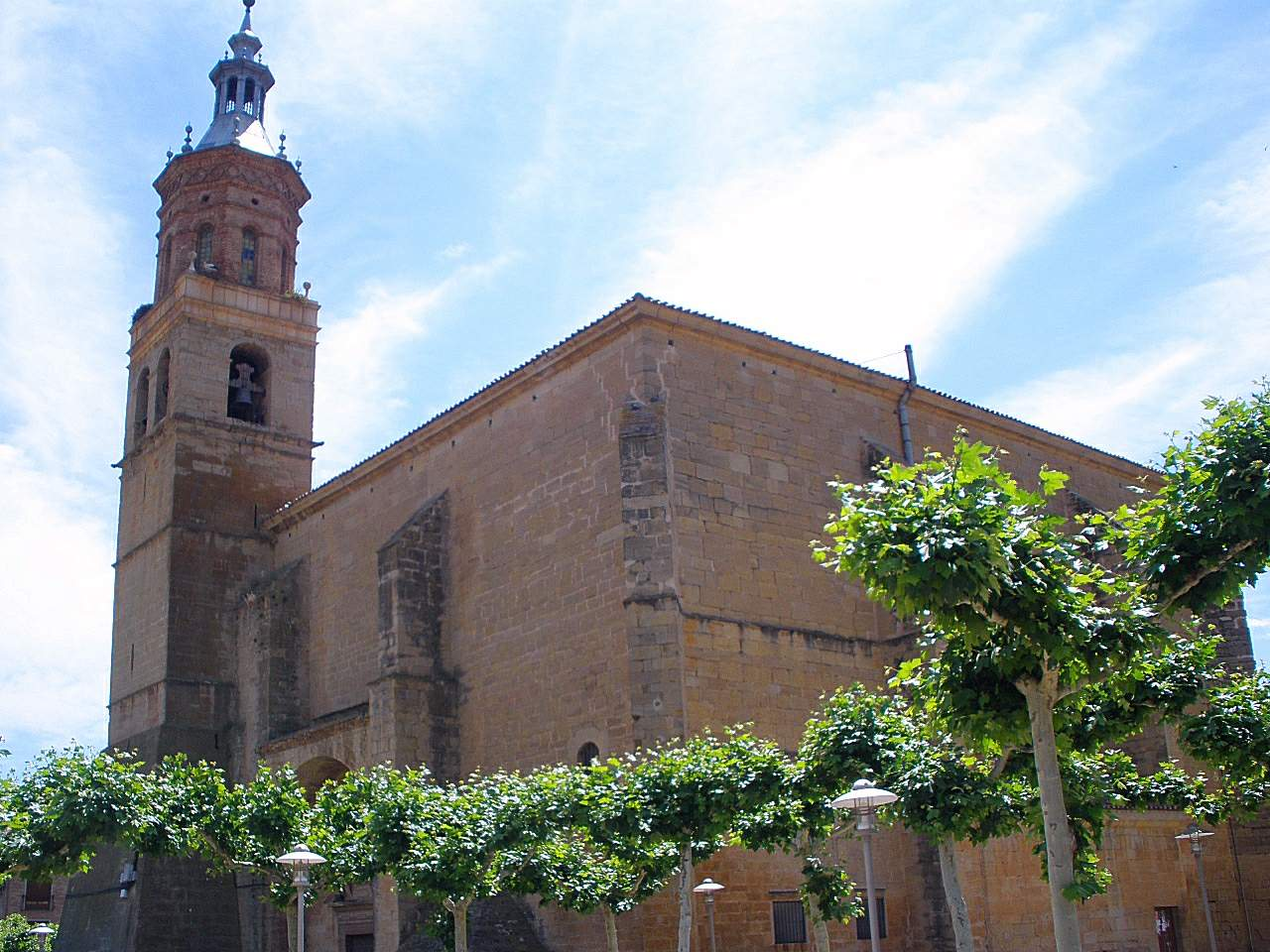
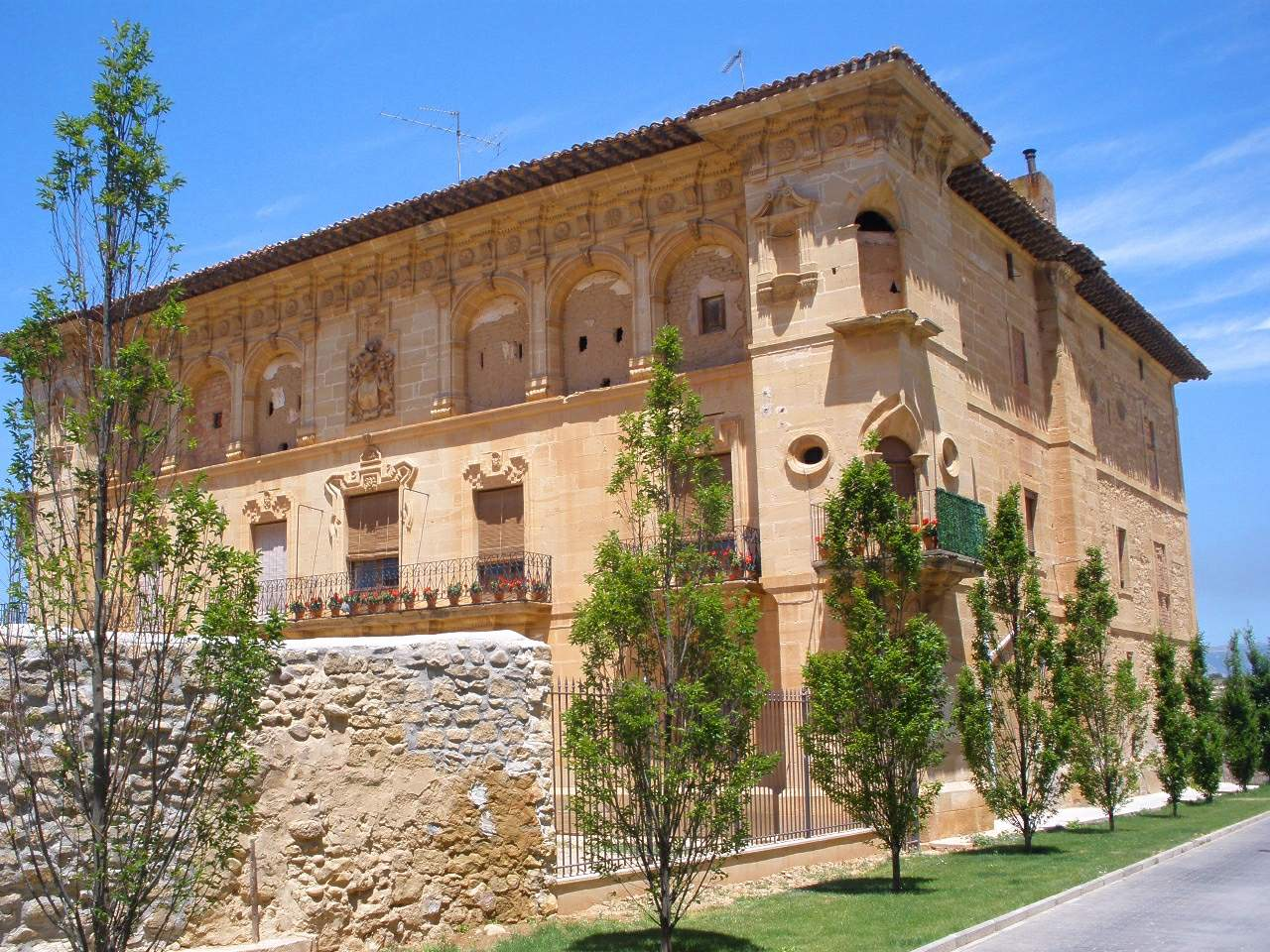
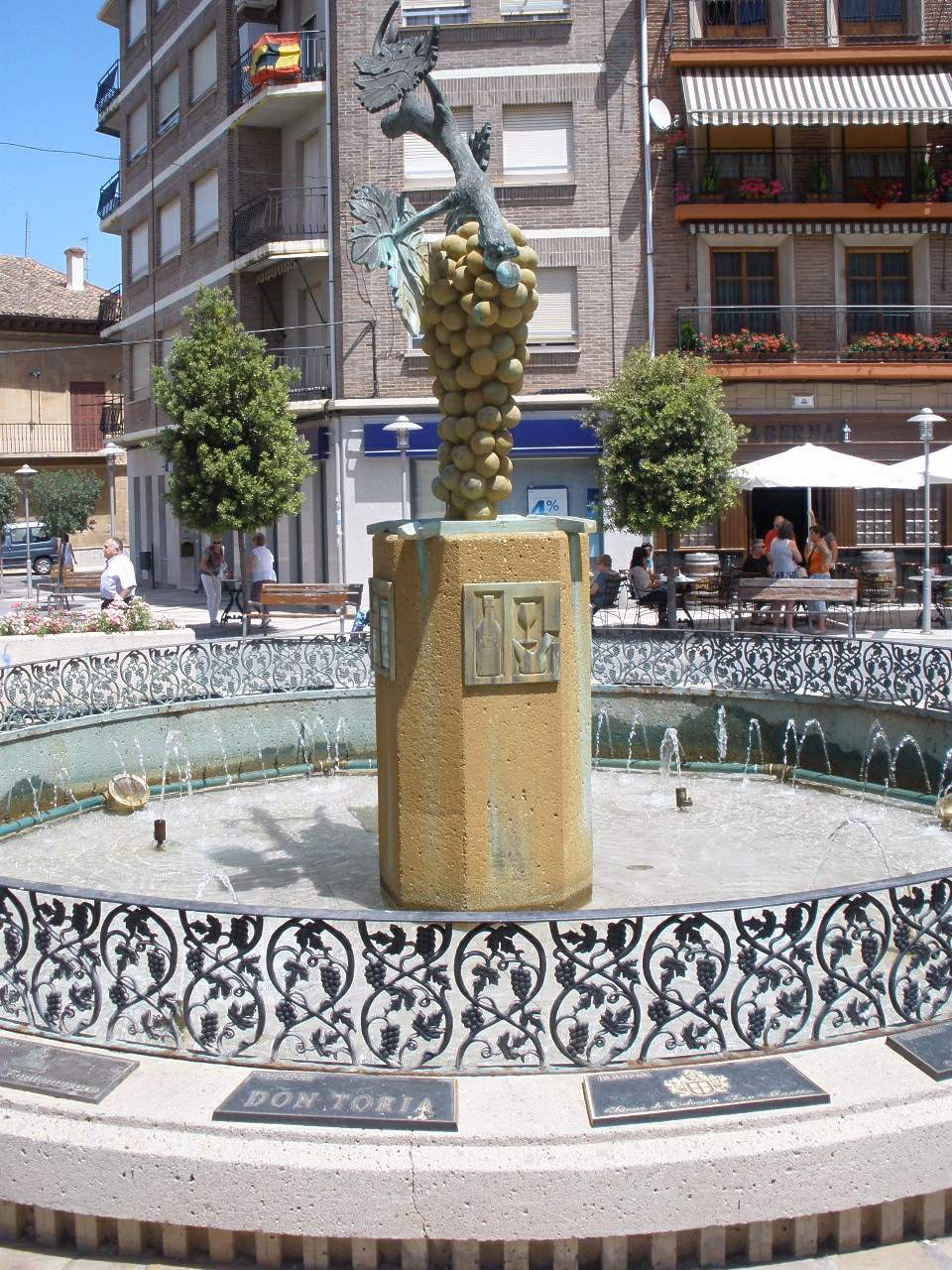
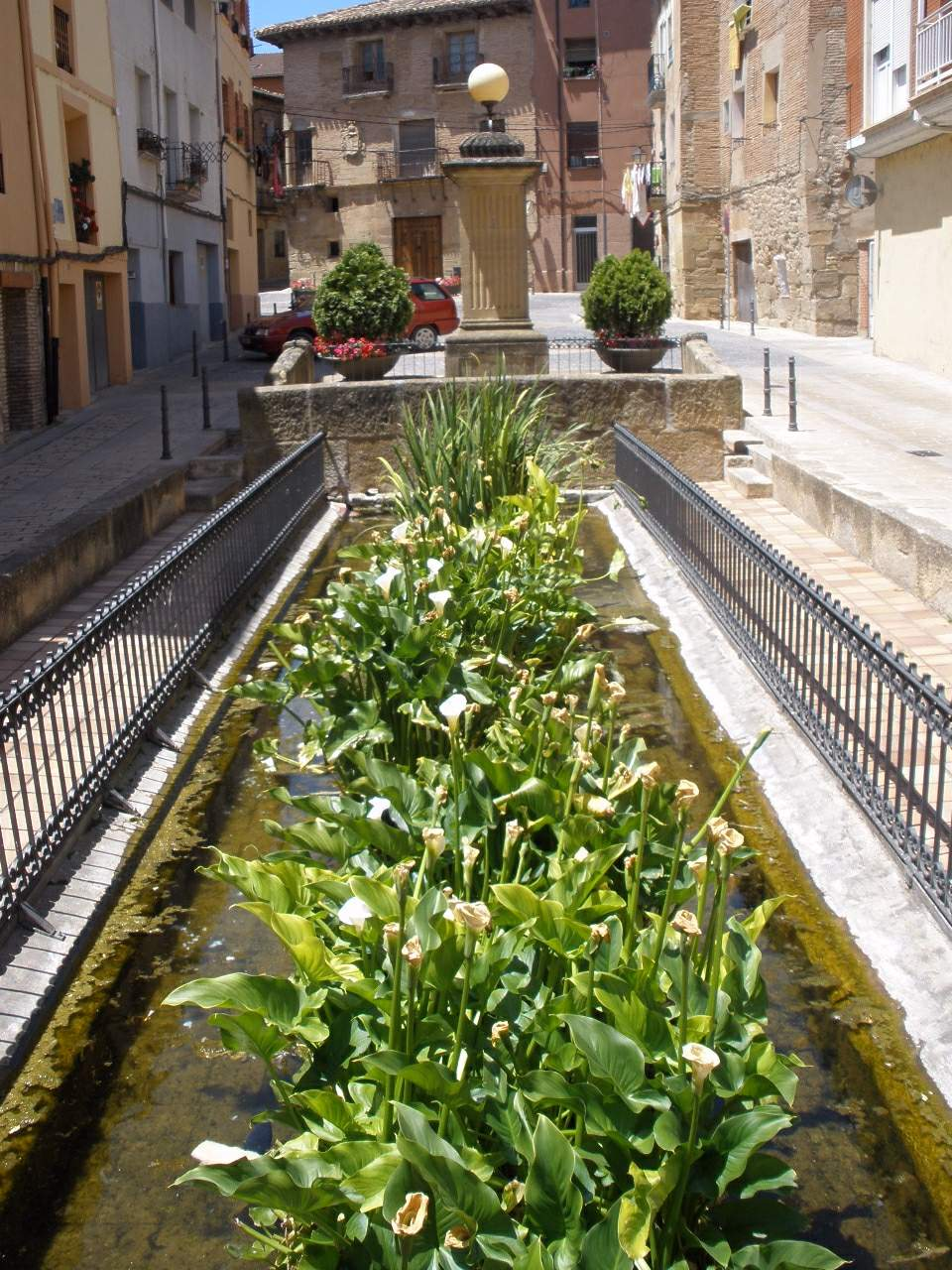

- Flag Coat of arms

- Location within La Rioja, Spain Location within Spain
- Coordinates: 42°28′00″N 2°33′36″W
- Country: Spain
- Autonomous community: La Rioja
- Comarca: Logroño

Government
  - Mayor: Alberto Peso Hernáiz (PP)

Area
  - Total: 34.29 km^{2} (13.24 sq mi)
- Elevation: 433 m (1,421 ft)

Population (2025-01-01)
  - Total: 3,281
- Postal code: 26360
- Website: www.fuenmayor.org

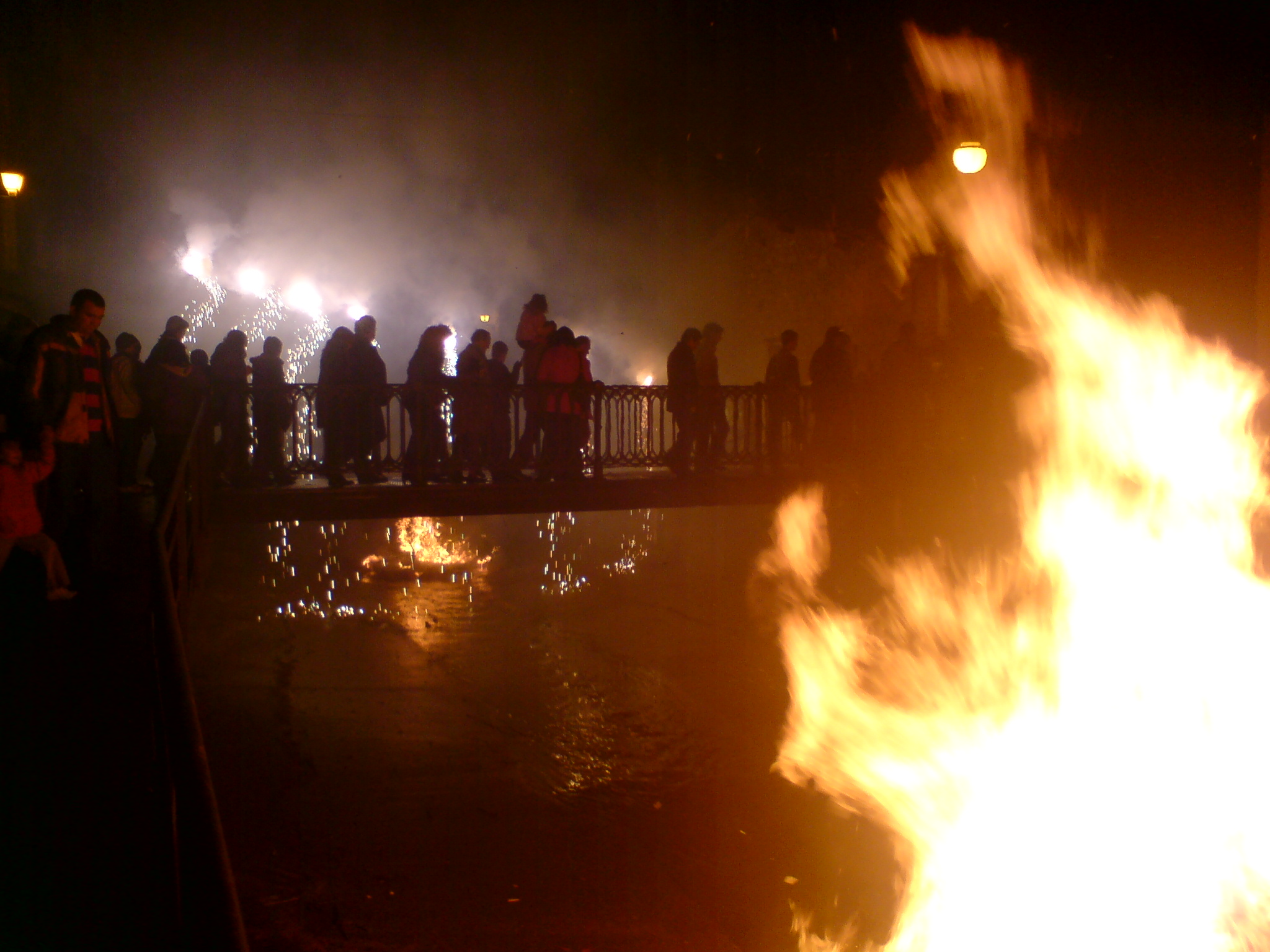
Fires at the "Fiestas de Los Marchos" in December in Fuenmayor.

Fuenmayor is a town located in the province of La Rioja, Spain. It is located ten kilometers from Logroño, the capital of La Rioja.

The town borders the Ebro river, the Basque-Aragonese freeway and railroad Logroño-Vitoria. Several industries and important warehouses have benefited from this strategic situation, which has also bolstered a constant increase of the population. There are 3,159 inhabitants.INE

== Politics ==
List of mayors since the democratic elections of 1979
Term	Mayor	Political party
1979–1983	César de Marcos	PSOE
1983–1987	César de Marcos	PSOE
1987–1991	César de Marcos	PSOE
1991–1995	Enrique Merino	PSOE
1995–1999	Enrique Merino	PSOE
1999–2003	Valentín Alonso	PSOE
2003–2007	Valentín Alonso	PSOE
2007–2011	Mª Carmen Arana Álvarez	PSOE
2011–2015	Mª Carmen Arana Álvarez	PSOE
2015–2019	Eduardo Abascal Falces/Alberto Peso Hernáiz	PSOE/PP
2019–2023	n/d	n/d
2023–	n/d	n/d

== Places of interest ==
=== Religious Buildings ===
- Church of Santa María
- Hermitage of the Christ
- Hermitage of Carmen
- Hermitage of San Martín
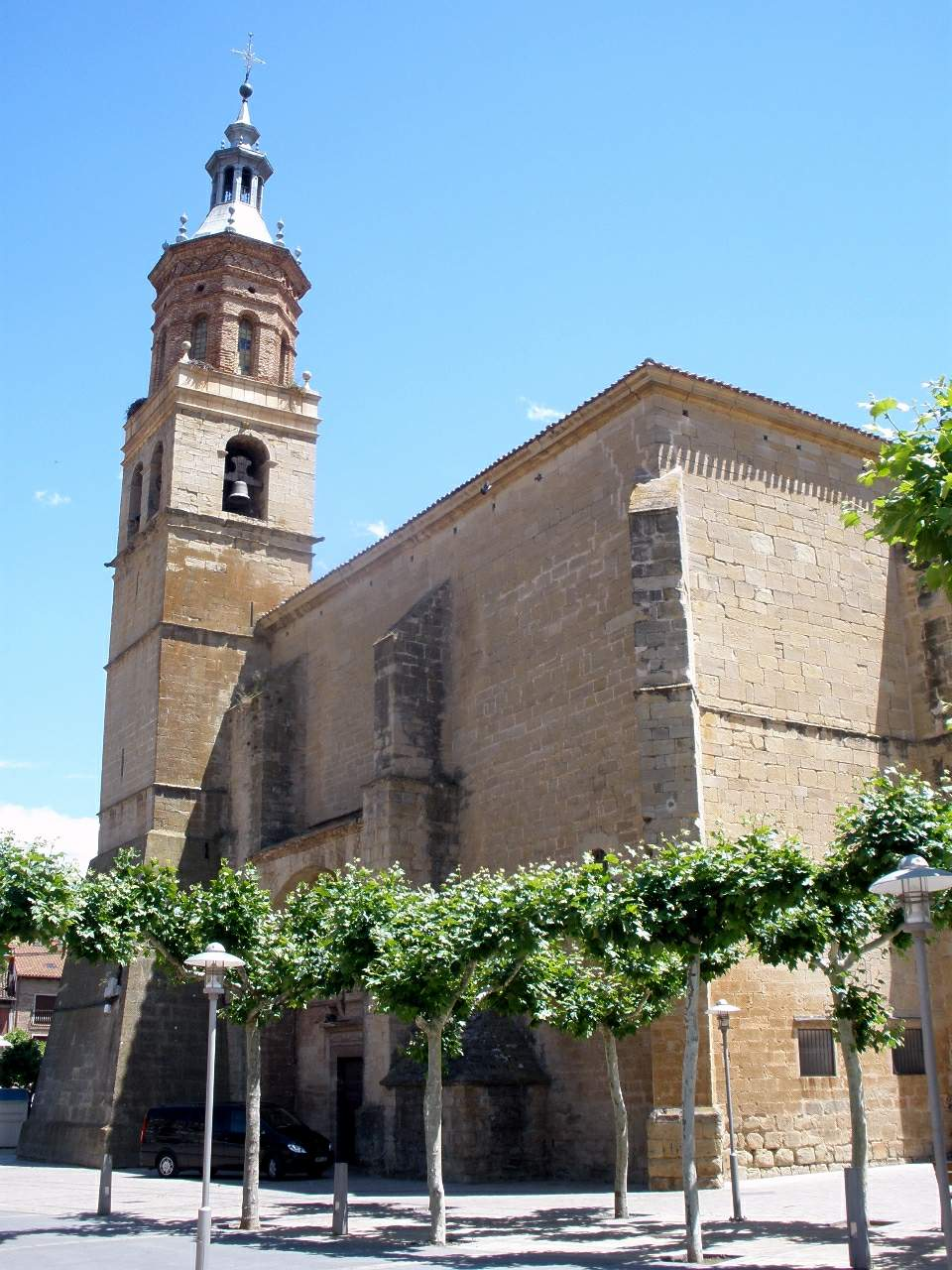
Church of Santa María

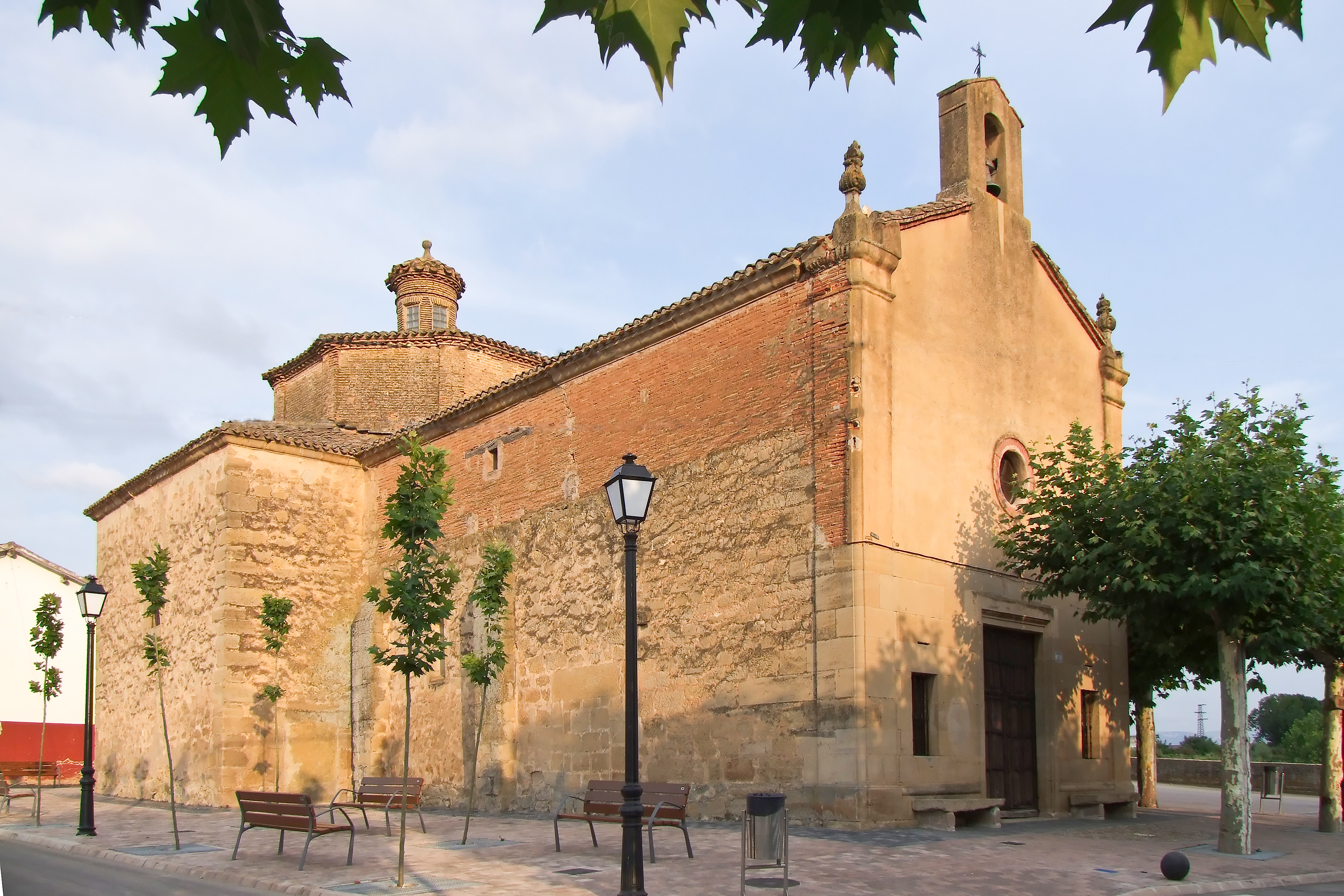
Hermitage of the Christ

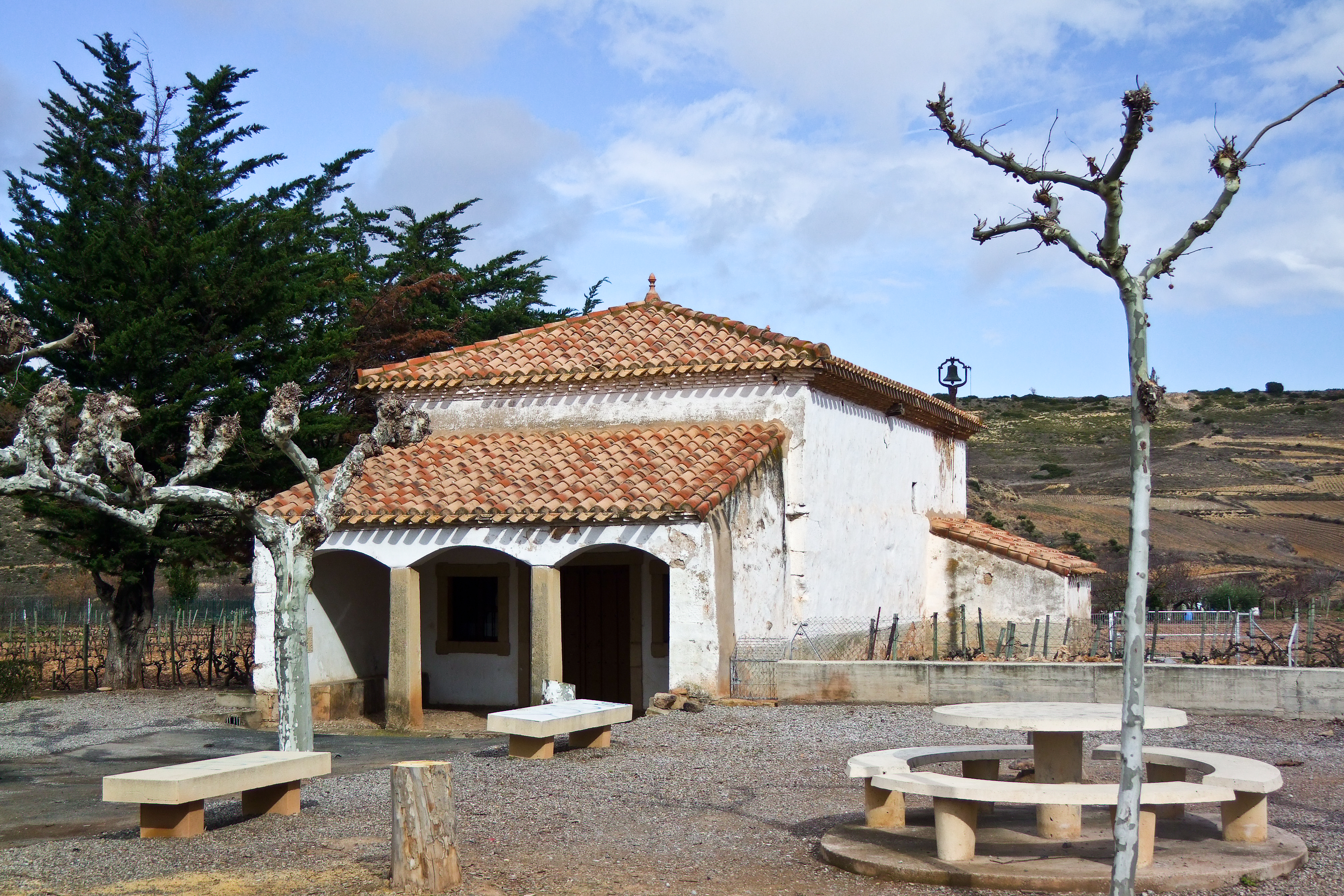
Hermitage of Carmen

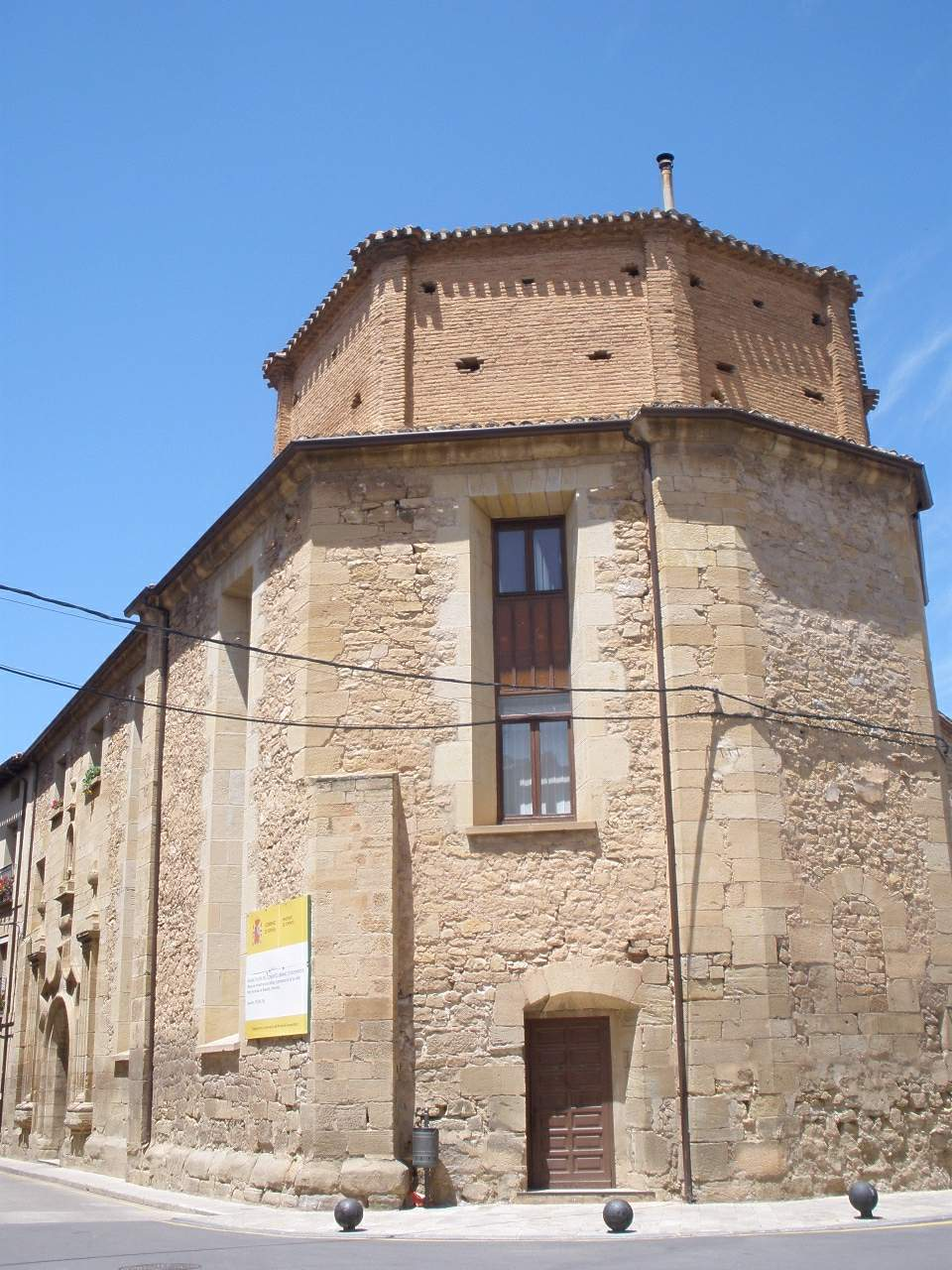
Hermitage of San Martín

=== Civil Buildings ===
- Palace of Fernández Bazán, from the 17th century.
- Palace of the marquises of Terán, former headquarters of the Real Junta de Cosecheros.
- Renaissance palace in the Mayor Alta 20 street.
- Palace of Urban del Campo
- House Navajas.
- El Portalón, Renaissance palace of the beginning of the 18th century.
- Cinema Gran Coliseo, building from the thirties, first spanish cinema with hanging amphitheater and without columns in the stalls.
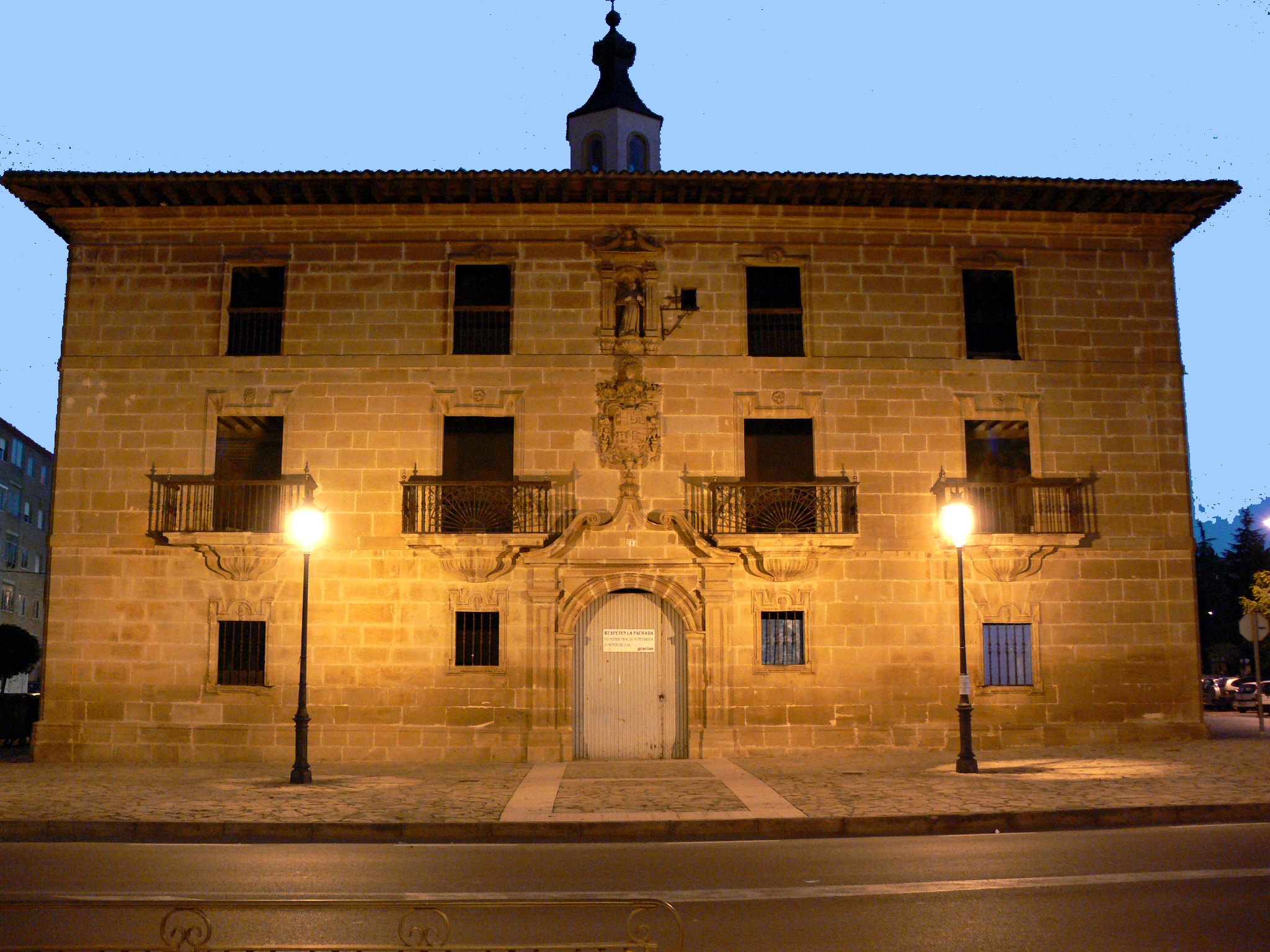
Palace of Fernández Bazán

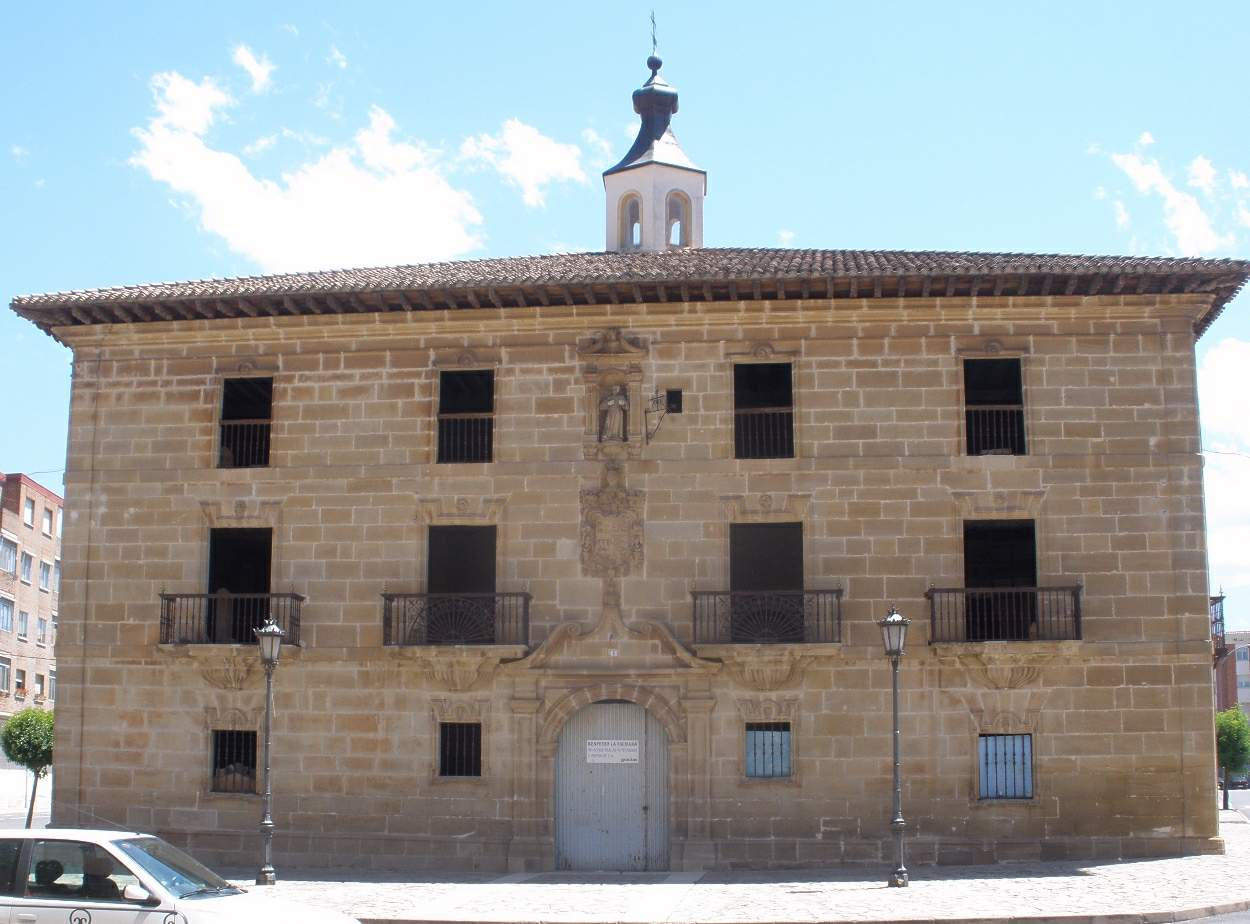

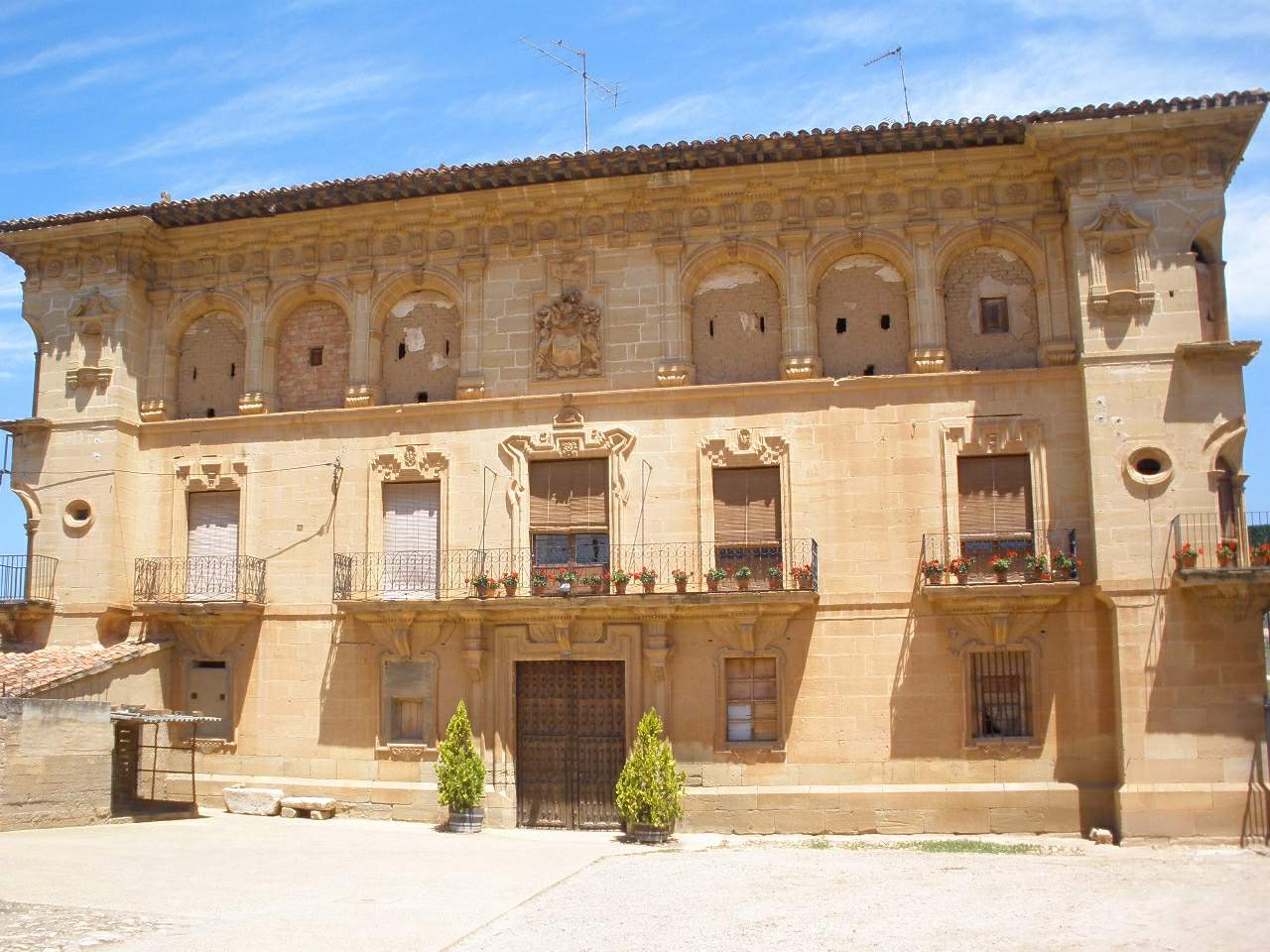
Palace of the marquises of Terán

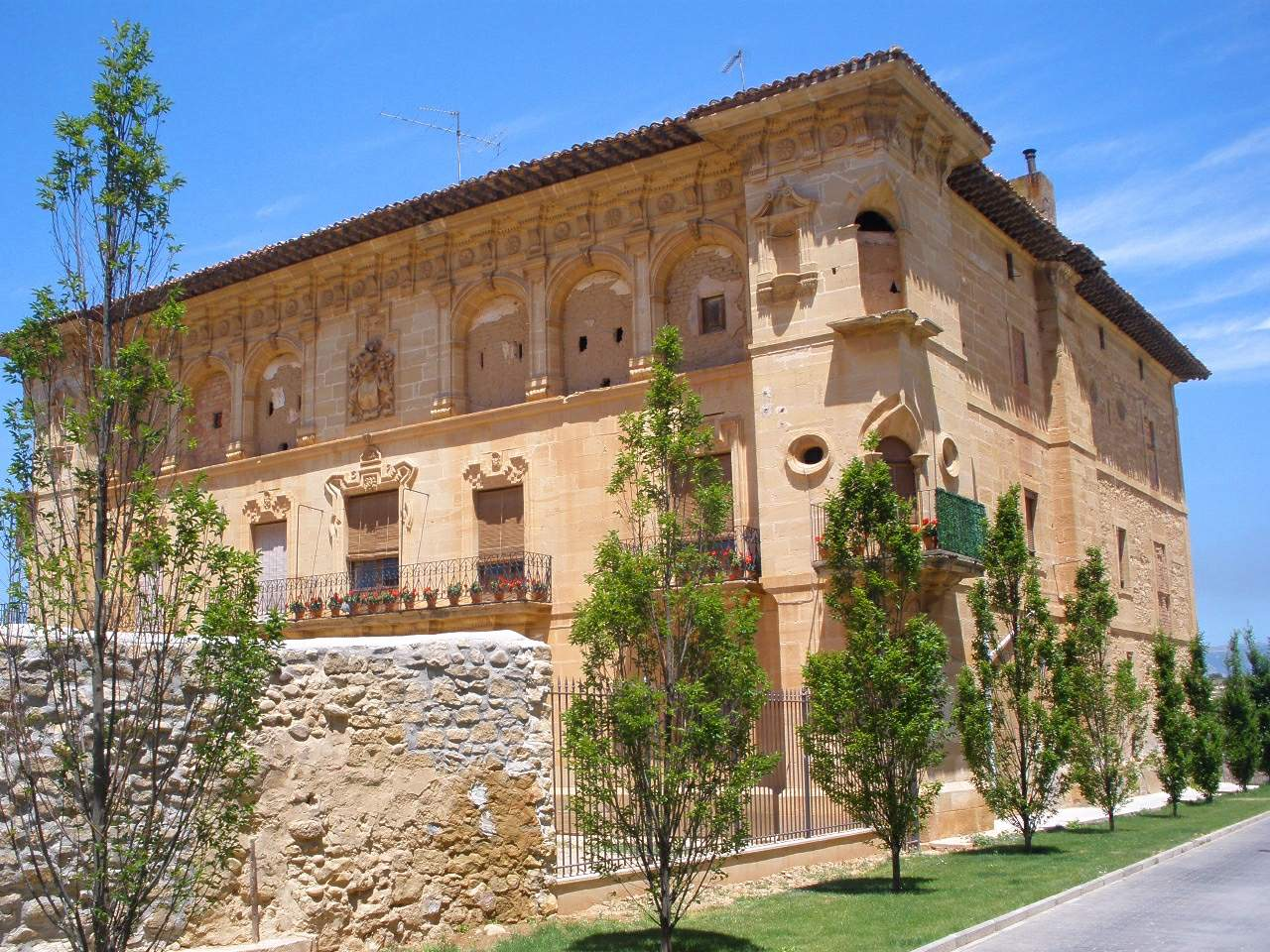

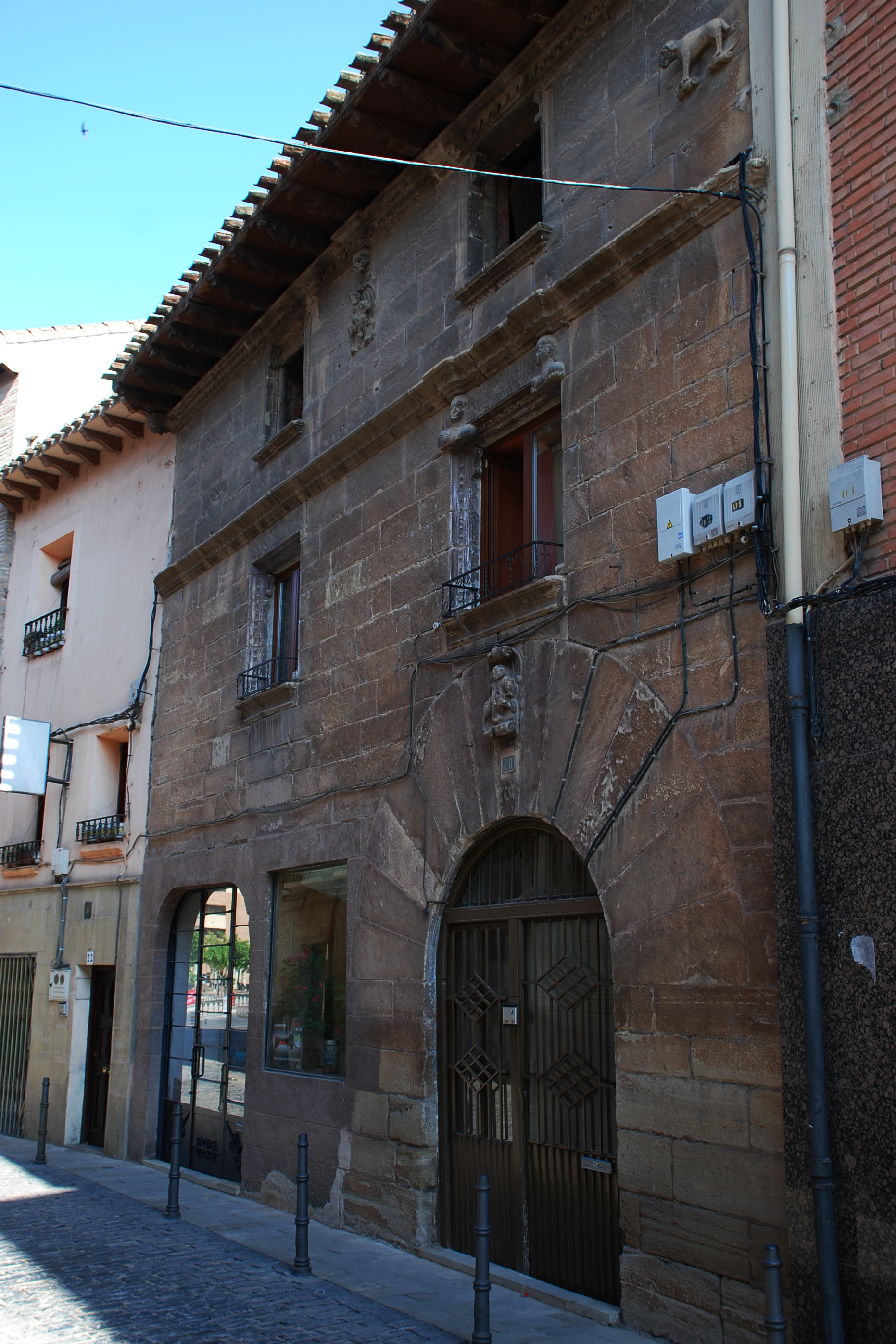
Renaissance palace, Mayor Alta 20

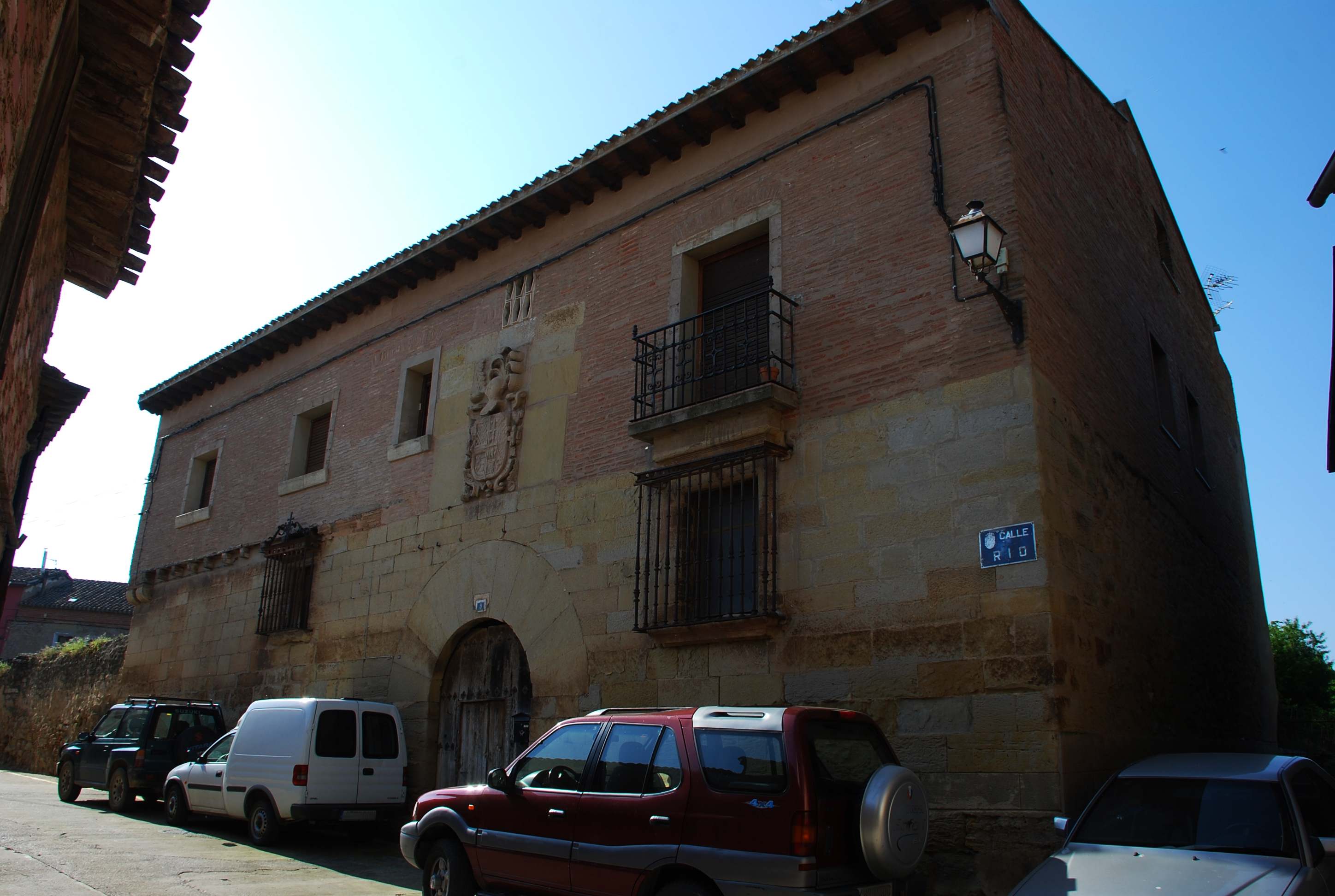
Palace of Urban del Campo
