= Castilseco =

- Populated place
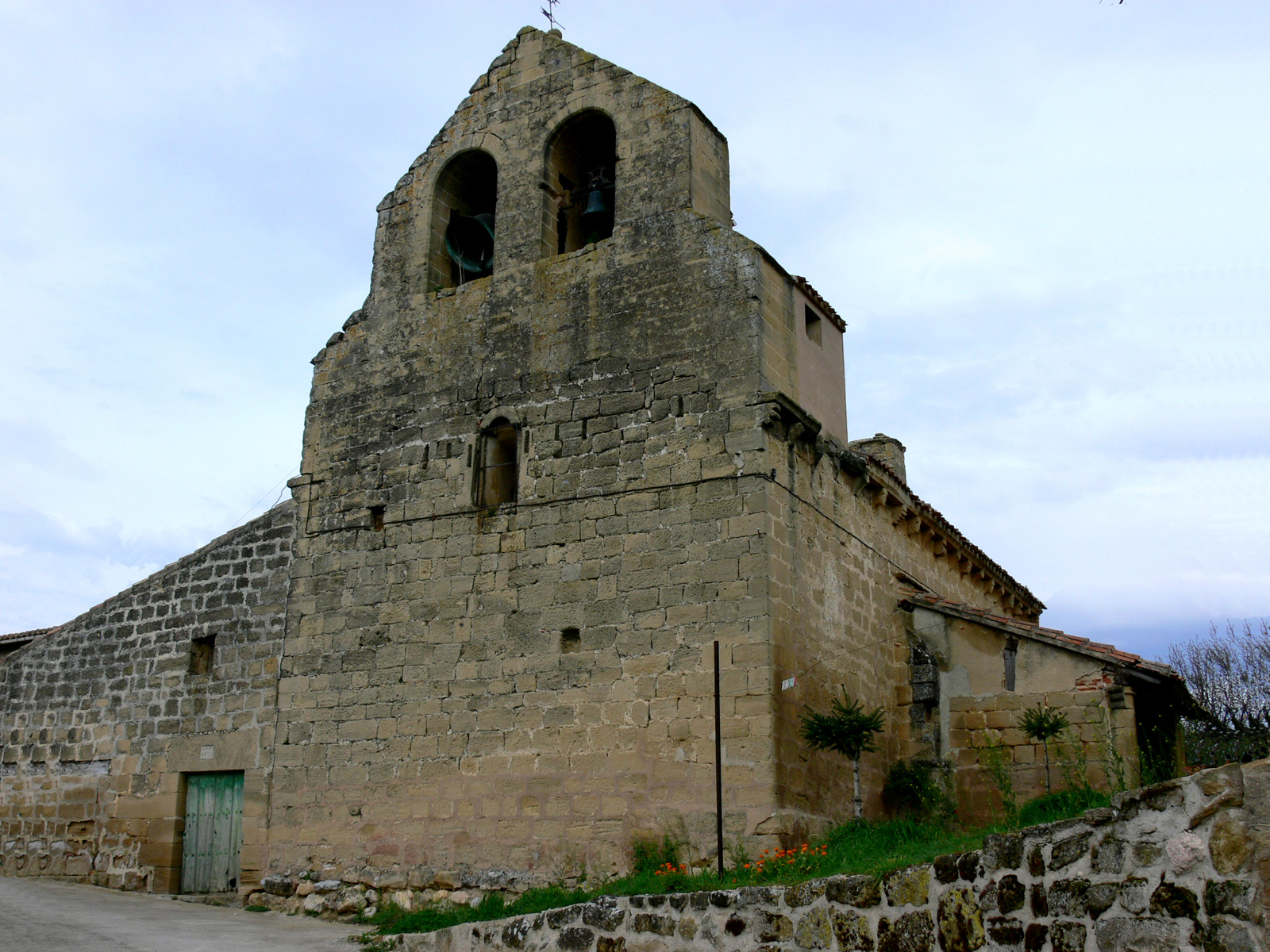
- Church of Saint Julian

- Location within La Rioja, Spain Location within Spain
- Country: Spain
- Autonomous community: La Rioja
- Comarca: Haro

Population
  - Total: 14
- Postal code: 26212

Castilseco is a village in the municipality of Galbárruli, in the province and autonomous community of La Rioja, Spain. As of 2018 had a population of 14 people.
