= Galbárruli =

- Municipality
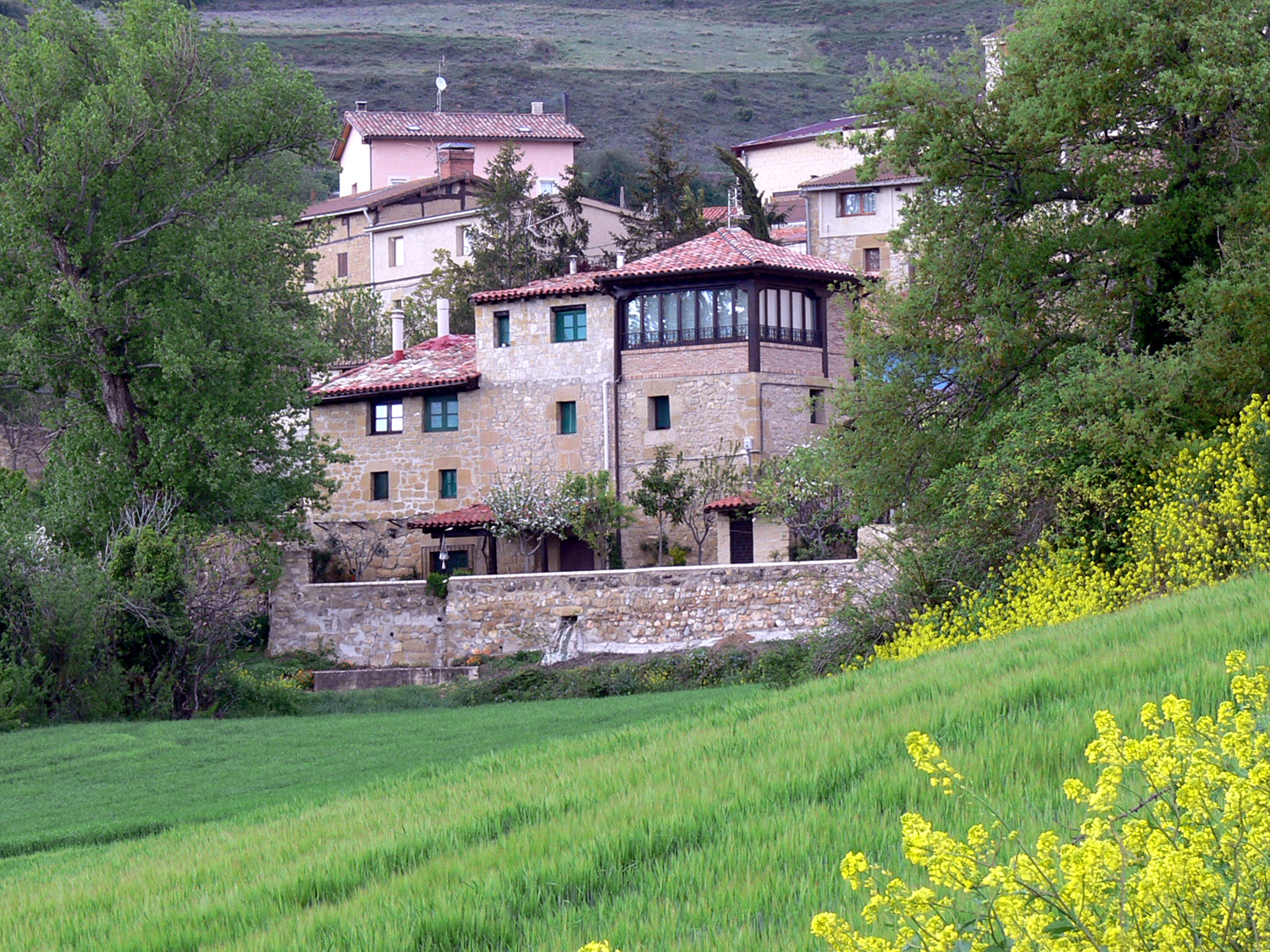
- Skyline of Galbárruli

- Location within La Rioja, Spain Location within Spain
- Coordinates: 42°37′21″N 2°57′40″W
- Country: Spain
- Autonomous community: La Rioja
- Comarca: Haro

Government
  - Mayor: Nicomedes Ruiz Martínez de Salinas (PP)

Area
  - Total: 15.44 km^{2} (5.96 sq mi)
- Elevation: 656 m (2,152 ft)

Population (2025-01-01 Consulta tu transferencia)
  - Total: 70
- Demonym(s): galbarrulino, na
- Postal code: 26212

Galbárruli is a village in the province and autonomous community of La Rioja, Spain. The municipality covers an area of 15.44 square kilometres (5.96 sq mi) and as of 2011 had a population of 63people.
